= Deal, New Jersey =

Borough in Monmouth County, New Jersey, US

- Borough
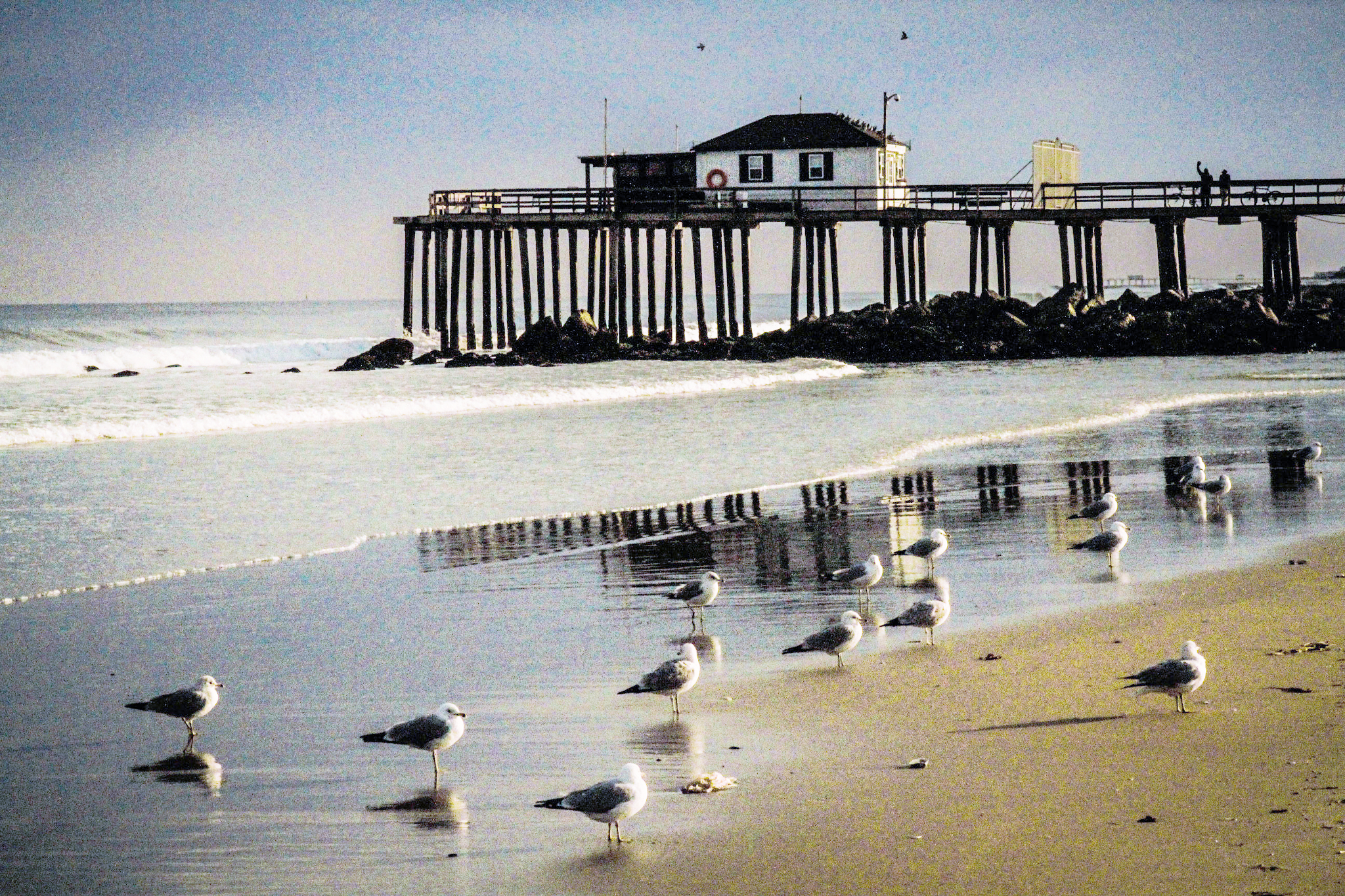
- Seagulls and the pier at Deal Beach

- Seal

- Location of Deal in Monmouth County highlighted in red (left). Inset map: Location of Monmouth County in New Jersey highlighted in orange (right).

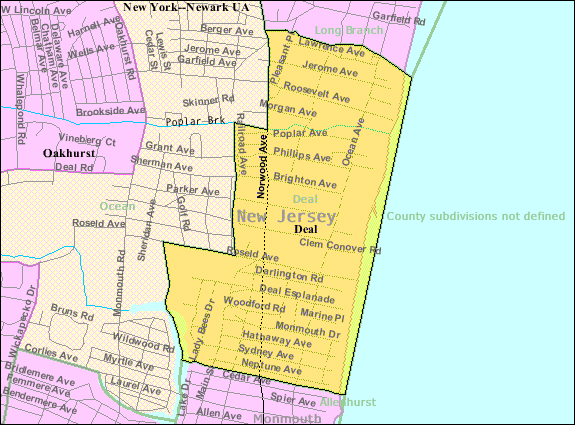
- Census Bureau map of Deal, New Jersey

- Location in Monmouth County Location in New Jersey Location in the United States
- Coordinates: 40.249701°N 73.997458°W
- Country: United States
- State: New Jersey
- County: Monmouth
- Incorporated: March 7, 1898
- Named for: Deal, Kent, England

Government
  - Type: Walsh Act
  - Body: Board of Commissioners
  - Mayor: Samuel M. Cohen (term ends May 16, 2028)
  - Administrator: Jo Anna Myung
  - Municipal clerk: Jo Anna Myung

Area
  - Total: 1.32 sq mi (3.42 km^{2})
  - Land: 1.19 sq mi (3.07 km^{2})
  - Water: 0.14 sq mi (0.35 km^{2}) 10.30%
  - Rank: 470th of 565 in state 41st of 53 in county
- Elevation: 30 ft (9.1 m)

Population (2020)
  - Total: 900
  - Estimate (2023): 888
  - Rank: 537th of 565 in state 49th of 53 in county
  - Density: 760/sq mi (290/km^{2})
  - Rank: 412th of 565 in state 49th of 53 in county
- Time zone: UTC−05:00 (Eastern (EST))
  - Summer (DST): UTC−04:00 (Eastern (EDT))
- ZIP Code: 07723
- Area code: 732 exchanges: 517, 531, 660, 663
- FIPS code: 3402516660
- GNIS feature ID: 0885194
- Website: dealnj.gov

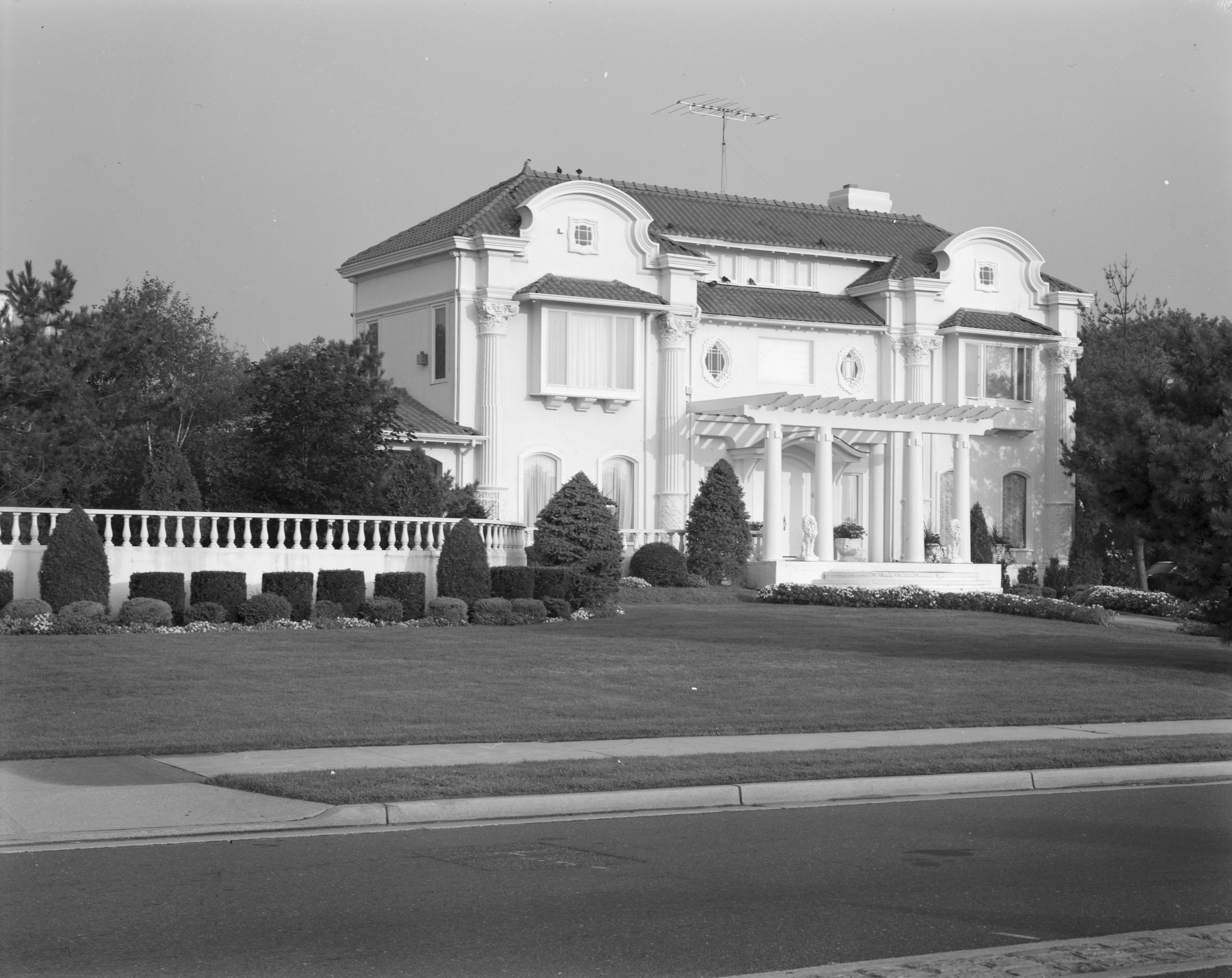
Typical mansion on Ocean Avenue in Deal

Deal is a borough situated on the Jersey Shore within Monmouth County, in the U.S. state of New Jersey. The community was settled by Europeans in the mid-1660s and named after an English carpenter from Deal, Kent. As of the 2020 United States census, the borough's population was 900, an increase of 150 (+20.0%) from the 2010 census count of 750, which in turn had reflected a decline of 320 (−29.9%) from the 1,070 counted in the 2000 census.

Deal is home to a significant population of Orthodox Sephardic Jews, mainly of Syrian origin. As many as 80% of Deal's Jewish population are Sephardi Jews, and the year-round population jumps ten-fold to over 6,000 during the summer, many of them Syrian Jews from Brooklyn, New York City. In the 2000 census, 16.4% of Deal residents identified as being of Syrian heritage, the greatest percentage of Syrian Americans in any municipality in the country. Most of the town consisted of homes close to or over one hundred years old in the Victorian and American Foursquare styles.

In 2026, Deal was listed as the 17th priciest ZIP code in the United States according to Zillow, with a median price of $4.545 million for a home. An analysis by Realtor.com for The Wall Street Journal showed a median listing price in June 2026 of nearly $5.5 million.

== History ==
A group from Rhode Island settled in the area of Middletown Township and Shrewsbury Township in the mid-1660s, after having purchased what was known as the Monmouth Patent. Thomas Whyte, an English carpenter from the shore-side community of Deal, Kent, acquired 500 acres (200 ha) in Shrewsbury Township along the shore that became known as "Deal", from the name of the English town. Present-day Norwood Avenue dates back to the early 18th century construction of the Long Branch-Deal Turnpike.

On August 14, 1829, at 11:30 PM local time, the fall of a meteorite was observed. The weight of the recovered stone was 28 grams (0.99 oz). The meteorite was officially named "Deal" and it was classified as an ordinary chondrite L.

Deal was incorporated as a borough on March 7, 1898, by an act of the New Jersey Legislature, from portions of Ocean Township.

In summer 2009, several residents of Deal were involved in a scandal called Operation Bid Rig, which involved public corruption, money laundering, and trafficking of human organs.

== Geography ==
According to the U.S. Census Bureau, the borough had a total area of 1.32 square miles (3.42 km^{2}), including 1.18 square miles (3.07 km^{2}) of land and 0.14 square miles (0.35 km^{2}) of water (10.30%). The borough's beaches have been expanded significantly due to reclamation of the beach by way of dredging.

Unincorporated communities, localities and place names located partially or completely within the borough include South Elberon.

The borough borders the Monmouth County communities of Allenhurst, Long Branch, and Ocean Township.

Deal Lake covers 158 acres (64 ha) and is overseen by the Deal Lake Commission, which was established in 1974. Seven municipalities border the lake, accounting for 27 miles (43 km) of shoreline, also including Allenhurst, Asbury Park, Interlaken, Loch Arbour, Neptune and Ocean Township.

== Demographics ==
Historical population
Census	Pop.	Note	%±
1900	70		—
1910	273		290.0%
1920	420		53.8%
1930	800		90.5%
1940	917		14.6%
1950	1,064		16.0%
1960	1,889		77.5%
1970	2,401		27.1%
1980	1,952		−18.7%
1990	1,179		−39.6%
2000	1,070		−9.2%
2010	750		−29.9%
2020	900		20.0%
2023 (est.)	888	▼	−1.3%
Population sources: 1900–1920; 1900–1910 1910–1930; 1940–2000 2000; 2010 2020

=== 2020 census ===
The 2020 United States Census and the 2020 American Community Survey 5-Year Estimates counted 900 people, 261 households, and 162 families in the borough. The population density was 758.3 people per square mile (292.8/km^{2}). There were 957 housing units at an average density of 797.5 per square mile (289.4/km^{2}). The racial makeup was 80.6% (725) White, 15% (135) Hispanic or Latino (of any race), 1.9% (17) Black or African American, 1.6% (14) Asian, and 0.9% (8) from two or more races.

Of the 261 households, 14.6% had children under the age of 18, 53.0% were married couples living together, 16.1% had a female householder with no spouse, 1.9% had a male householder with no spouse, and 28.7% were non-family (living alone or roommates).

19.7% of the population were under the age of 18 (177), 11.2% (101) from 18 to 24, 16.8% (151) from 25 to 44, 23.3% (210) from 45 to 64, and 29.0% (261) 65 years of age or older. The median age was 47.9 years. For every 100 females, the population had 94.8 males. For every 100 females ages 18 and older there were 91.2 males.

=== 2010 census ===
The 2010 United States census counted 750 people, 333 households, and 182 families in the borough. The population density was 604.8 people per square mile (233.5/km^{2}). There were 926 housing units at an average density of 746.7 per square mile (288.3/km^{2}). The racial makeup was 91.60% (687) White, 1.60% (12) Black or African American, 3.47% (26) Asian, 0.13% (1) Pacific Islander, 2.00% (15) from other races, and 1.20% (9) from two or more races. Hispanic or Latino of any race were 7.33% (55) of the population.

Of the 333 households, 12.9% had children under the age of 18; 40.8% were married couples living together; 9.6% had a female householder with no husband present and 45.3% were non-families. Of all households, 35.7% were made up of individuals and 17.1% had someone living alone who was 65 years of age or older. The average household size was 2.25 and the average family size was 2.90.

14.3% of the population were under the age of 18, 11.9% from 18 to 24, 17.6% from 25 to 44, 27.6% from 45 to 64, and 28.7% who were 65 years of age or older. The median age was 50.9 years. For every 100 females, the population had 88.0 males. For every 100 females ages 18 and older there were 82.7 males.

The Census Bureau's 2006–2010 American Community Survey showed that (in 2010 inflation-adjusted dollars) median household income was $59,615 (with a margin of error of +/− $17,199) and the median family income was $95,833 (+/− $32,359). Males had a median income of $52,625 (+/− $17,303) versus $25,139 (+/− $4,348) for females. The per capita income for the borough was $46,867 (+/− $8,038). About 4.1% of families and 6.7% of the population were below the poverty line, including 7.4% of those under age 18 and 3.6% of those age 65 or over.

=== 2000 census ===
As of the 2000 U.S. census, there were 1,070 people, 434 households, and 289 families residing in the borough. The population density was 880.5 inhabitants per square mile (340.0/km^{2}). There were 953 housing units at an average density of 784.3 per square mile (302.8/km^{2}). The racial makeup of the borough was 94.39% White, 1.21% African American, 0.09% Native American, 0.28% Asian, 2.71% from other races, and 1.31% from two or more races. Hispanic or Latino people of any race were 5.05% of the population.

There were 434 households, out of which 19.8% had children under the age of 18 living with them, 56.2% were married couples living together, 7.1% had a female householder with no husband present, and 33.2% were non-families. 29.0% of all households were made up of individuals, and 13.6% had someone living alone who was 65 years of age or older. The average household size was 2.46 and the average family size was 3.02.

In the borough the population was spread out, with 20.5% under the age of 18, 7.9% from 18 to 24, 21.9% from 25 to 44, 23.0% from 45 to 64, and 26.7% who were 65 years of age or older. The median age was 45 years. For every 100 females, there were 100.0 males. For every 100 females age 18 and over, there were 94.7 males.

The median income for a household in the borough was $58,472, and the median income for a family was $65,313. Males had a median income of $57,857 versus $27,813 for females. The per capita income for the borough was $38,510. About 7.8% of families and 11.2% of the population were below the poverty line, including 14.0% of those under age 18 and 6.6% of those age 65 or over.

== Government ==
=== Local government ===
Deal is governed under the Walsh Act form of government. The borough is one of 30 municipalities (of the 564) statewide that use the commission form of government. The governing body consists of three commissioners, who are elected at-large on a non-partisan basis to serve concurrent four-year terms of office as part of the May municipal election. Each commissioner is assigned a department to administer and oversee; the commissioners select one of their members to serve as mayor.

As of 2025, members of the Deal Committee are Mayor Samuel M. Cohen (Commissioner of Public Affairs and Public Safety), Jack A. Kassin (Commissioner of Revenue and Finance) and David Simhon (Commissioner of Public Works, Parks and Public Property), all serving concurrent terms of office ending May 15, 2028.

Mayor Harry Franco, who had first been elected as a commissioner, died on January 30, 2013.

=== Federal, state, and county representation ===
Deal is located in the 6th Congressional District and is part of New Jersey's 11th state legislative district.

For the 119th United States Congress, New Jersey's 6th congressional district is represented by Frank Pallone (D, Long Branch). New Jersey is represented in the United States Senate by Democrats Cory Booker (Newark, term ends 2027) and Andy Kim (Moorestown, term ends 2031).

For the 2026–2027 session, the 11th legislative district of the New Jersey Legislature is represented in the New Jersey Senate by Vin Gopal (D, Long Branch) and in the General Assembly by Margie Donlon (D, Ocean Township) and Luanne Peterpaul (D, Long Branch).

Monmouth County is governed by a Board of County Commissioners composed of five members who are elected at-large to serve three-year terms of office on a staggered basis, with either one or two seats up for election each year as part of the November general election. At an annual reorganization meeting held in the beginning of January, the board selects one of its members to serve as director and another as deputy director.

As of 2026, Monmouth County's Commissioners are Director Thomas A. Arnone (R, Neptune City, 2028),Deputy Director Nick DiRocco (R, Wall Township, 2028), Susan M. Kiley (R, Hazlet Township, 2027), Erik Anderson (R, Shrewsbury, 2026), and Ross F. Licitra (R, Marlboro Township, 2026).

Constitutional officers elected on a countywide basis are Clerk Christine Giordano Hanlon (R, 2030; Ocean Township), Sheriff Shaun Golden (R, 2028; Howell Township) and Surrogate Maureen Raisch (R, 2026; Middletown Township).

=== Politics ===
United States presidential election results for Deal
Year	Republican		Democratic		Third party(ies)	
Year	No.	%	No.	%	No.	%
2024	328	85.64%	53	13.84%	2	0.52%
2020	282	73.63%	101	26.37%	0	0.00%
2016	206	65.81%	103	32.91%	4	1.28%
2012	225	71.43%	88	27.94%	2	0.63%
2008	303	73.01%	110	26.51%	2	0.48%
2004	314	66.95%	151	32.20%	4	0.85%
2000	162	34.76%	295	63.30%	9	1.93%
1996	194	40.84%	250	52.63%	31	6.53%
1992	310	47.84%	254	39.20%	84	12.96%

As of March 2011, there were a total of 616 registered voters in Deal, of which 113 (18.3%) were registered as Democrats, 146 (23.7%) were registered as Republicans and 357 (58.0%) were registered as Unaffiliated. There were no voters registered to other parties.

In the 2012 presidential election, Republican Mitt Romney received 71.4% of the vote (225 cast), ahead of Democrat Barack Obama with 27.9% (88 votes), and other candidates with 0.6% (2 votes), among the 316 ballots cast by the borough's 602 registered voters (1 ballot was spoiled), for a turnout of 52.5%. In the 2008 presidential election, Republican John McCain received 71.0% of the vote (303 cast), ahead of Democrat Barack Obama with 25.8% (110 votes) and other candidates with 0.5% (2 votes), among the 427 ballots cast by the borough's 678 registered voters, for a turnout of 63.0%. In the 2004 presidential election, Republican George W. Bush received 66.7% of the vote (314 ballots cast), outpolling Democrat John Kerry with 32.1% (151 votes) and other candidates with 0.5% (4 votes), among the 471 ballots cast by the borough's 768 registered voters, for a turnout percentage of 61.3.

Gubernatorial election results for Deal
Year	Republican		Democratic		Third party(ies)	
Year	No.	%	No.	%	No.	%
2025	248	87.02%	35	12.28%	2	0.70%
2021	161	81.31%	36	18.18%	1	0.51%
2017	100	63.29%	57	36.08%	1	0.63%
2013	122	75.78%	36	22.36%	3	1.86%
2009	172	65.40%	83	31.56%	8	3.04%
2005	132	48.00%	138	50.18%	5	1.82%

In the 2013 gubernatorial election, Republican Chris Christie received 75.8% of the vote (122 cast), ahead of Democrat Barbara Buono with 22.4% (36 votes), and other candidates with 1.9% (3 votes), among the 163 ballots cast by the borough's 597 registered voters (2 ballots were spoiled), for a turnout of 27.3%. In the 2009 gubernatorial election, Republican Chris Christie received 65.4% of the vote (172 ballots cast), ahead of Democrat Jon Corzine with 31.6% (83 votes) and Independent Chris Daggett with 3.0% (8 votes), among the 263 ballots cast by the borough's 654 registered voters, yielding a 40.2% turnout.

United States Senate election results for Deal1
Year	Republican		Democratic		Third party(ies)	
Year	No.	%	No.	%	No.	%
2024	303	84.64%	53	14.80%	2	0.56%
2018	134	62.33%	78	36.28%	3	1.40%
2012	195	65.22%	100	33.44%	4	1.34%
2006	143	56.30%	108	42.52%	3	1.18%

United States Senate election results for Deal2
Year	Republican		Democratic		Third party(ies)	
Year	No.	%	No.	%	No.	%
2020	261	72.10%	96	26.52%	5	1.38%
2014	96	64.43%	50	33.56%	3	2.01%
2013	63	60.00%	41	39.05%	1	0.95%
2008	227	59.89%	148	39.05%	4	1.06%

== Education ==
Deal School District serves public school students in kindergarten through eighth grade at Deal School. As of the 2022–23 school year, the district, comprised of one school, had an enrollment of 160 students and 19.6 classroom teachers (on an FTE basis), for a student–teacher ratio of 8.2:1. In the 2016–17 school year, Deal had the 35th-smallest enrollment of any school district in the state, with 165 students. In the 2013–2014 school year, nearly 90% of the district's enrollment was from students participating in the Interdistrict Public School Choice Program, for whom the state paid the district $12,500 in supplemental aid per student.

For ninth through twelfth grades, students attend Shore Regional High School, as part of a sending/receiving relationship. As of the 2022–23 school year, the high school had an enrollment of 585 students and 52.6 classroom teachers (on an FTE basis), for a student–teacher ratio of 11.1:1.

Students also have the option to attend Academy Charter High School in Lake Como, which accepts students on a lottery basis from the communities of Allenhurst, Asbury Park, Avon-by-the-Sea, Belmar, Bradley Beach, Deal, Interlaken and Lake Como.

== Houses of worship ==
Area synagogues and churches include:

- Edmond J. Safra Synagogue of Deal, the Hathaway Avenue Synagogue (Orthodox, Syrian traditions)
- Bet Yosef, Hechal Shaul Synagogue, Ahaba Ve Ahva (Orthodox, Syrian traditions, Egyptian traditions)
- Magen David of West Deal, (Orthodox, Syrian traditions)
- Ohel Yaakob, the Lawrence Avenue Synagogue (Orthodox, Syrian traditions)
- Ohel Simha, the Park Avenue Synagogue (Orthodox, Syrian traditions)
- Synagogue of Deal (Orthodox, Syrian traditions)
- Saint Mary's of the Assumption, at Richmond Avenue (Roman Catholic)
- Joseph S. Jemal Synagogue of Deal extension of the Hathaway Synagogue (Orthodox, Syrian traditions)

== Transportation ==
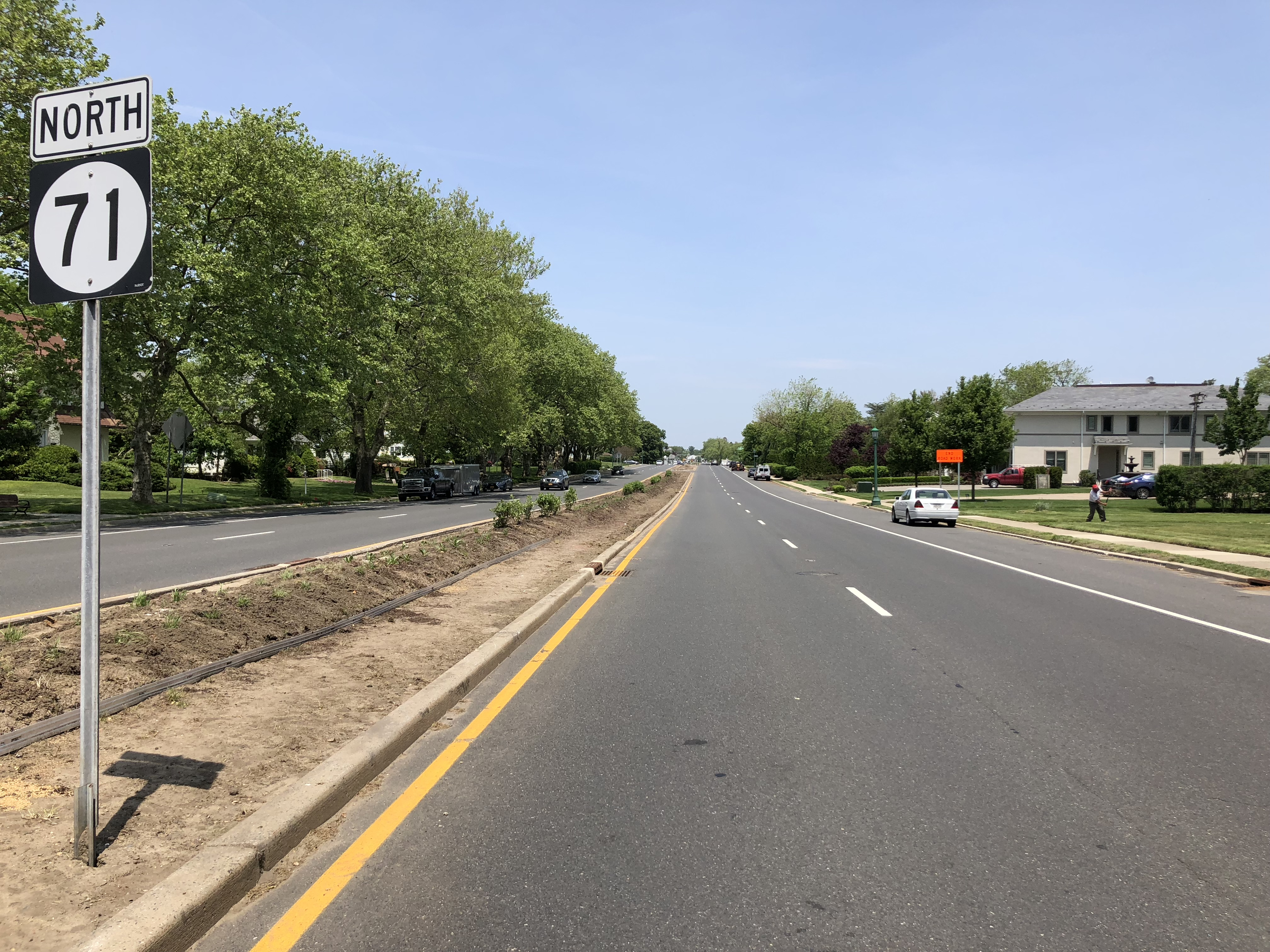
Route 71 in Deal

=== Roads and highways ===
As of May 2010, the borough had a total of 18.57 miles (29.89 km) of roadways, of which 17.11 miles (27.54 km) were maintained by the municipality, 0.00 miles (0 km) by Monmouth County and 1.46 miles (2.35 km) by the New Jersey Department of Transportation.

Route 71 is the only state highway serving Deal directly—much of which is a divided road with a median. However, several other highways are accessible in neighboring towns, including Route 35, Route 18, Route 66, and the Garden State Parkway.

=== Public transportation ===
NJ Transit provides local bus transportation on the 837 route. NJ Transit train service is available at the Allenhurst and Elberon stations on the North Jersey Coast Line.

== Climate ==
According to the Köppen climate classification system, Deal has a humid subtropical climate (Cfa). Cfa climates are characterized by all months having an average temperature above 32.0 °F (0.0 °C), at least four months with an average temperature at or above 50.0 °F (10.0 °C), at least one month with an average temperature at or above 71.6 °F (22.0 °C) and no significant precipitation difference between seasons. Although most summer days are slightly humid with a cooling afternoon sea breeze in Deal, episodes of heat and high humidity can occur with heat index values above 103 °F (39 °C). Since 1981, the highest air temperature was 100.5 °F (38.1 °C) on August 9, 2001, and the highest daily average mean dew point was 77.5 °F (25.3 °C) on August 13, 2016. July is the peak in thunderstorm activity and the average wettest month is August. Since 1981, the wettest calendar day was 5.60 inches (142 mm) on August 27, 2011. During the winter months, the average annual extreme minimum air temperature is 3.4 °F (−15.9 °C). Since 1981, the coldest air temperature was −6.6 °F (−21.4 °C) on January 22, 1984. Episodes of extreme cold and wind can occur with wind chill values below −7 °F (−22 °C). The average seasonal (November–April) snowfall total is 18 to 24 inches (46 to 61 cm), and the average snowiest month is February which corresponds with the annual peak in nor'easter activity.

Climate data for Deal, 1981–2010 normals, extremes 1981–2019
Month	Jan	Feb	Mar	Apr	May	Jun	Jul	Aug	Sep	Oct	Nov	Dec	Year
Record high °F (°C)	71.6 (22.0)	79.0 (26.1)	82.7 (28.2)	88.2 (31.2)	95.4 (35.2)	97.5 (36.4)	100.3 (37.9)	100.5 (38.1)	97.5 (36.4)	94.2 (34.6)	81.1 (27.3)	75.1 (23.9)	100.5 (38.1)
Mean daily maximum °F (°C)	39.9 (4.4)	42.5 (5.8)	49.0 (9.4)	58.7 (14.8)	68.2 (20.1)	77.5 (25.3)	82.8 (28.2)	81.5 (27.5)	75.4 (24.1)	65.1 (18.4)	55.2 (12.9)	45.1 (7.3)	61.8 (16.6)
Daily mean °F (°C)	32.4 (0.2)	34.7 (1.5)	40.9 (4.9)	50.3 (10.2)	59.9 (15.5)	69.4 (20.8)	74.9 (23.8)	73.8 (23.2)	67.3 (19.6)	56.4 (13.6)	47.3 (8.5)	37.7 (3.2)	53.8 (12.1)
Mean daily minimum °F (°C)	24.9 (−3.9)	26.9 (−2.8)	32.7 (0.4)	41.9 (5.5)	51.6 (10.9)	61.3 (16.3)	67.1 (19.5)	66.1 (18.9)	59.3 (15.2)	47.7 (8.7)	39.4 (4.1)	30.2 (−1.0)	45.8 (7.7)
Record low °F (°C)	−6.6 (−21.4)	0.7 (−17.4)	5.2 (−14.9)	18.2 (−7.7)	34.1 (1.2)	44.1 (6.7)	47.7 (8.7)	45.0 (7.2)	38.5 (3.6)	25.7 (−3.5)	14.6 (−9.7)	−0.5 (−18.1)	−6.6 (−21.4)
Average precipitation inches (mm)	3.61 (92)	3.06 (78)	3.87 (98)	4.19 (106)	3.93 (100)	3.58 (91)	4.69 (119)	4.83 (123)	3.67 (93)	4.00 (102)	3.81 (97)	4.03 (102)	47.27 (1,201)
Average relative humidity (%)	64.9	62.0	60.5	62.1	66.0	70.5	69.9	71.7	71.6	69.4	67.3	65.3	66.8
Average dew point °F (°C)	21.9 (−5.6)	23.0 (−5.0)	28.3 (−2.1)	37.8 (3.2)	48.5 (9.2)	59.4 (15.2)	64.4 (18.0)	64.1 (17.8)	57.8 (14.3)	46.5 (8.1)	37.0 (2.8)	27.1 (−2.7)	43.1 (6.2)
Source: PRISM

Climate data for Sandy Hook, NJ Ocean Water Temperature (15 N Deal)
Month	Jan	Feb	Mar	Apr	May	Jun	Jul	Aug	Sep	Oct	Nov	Dec	Year
Daily mean °F (°C)	37 (3)	36 (2)	40 (4)	46 (8)	55 (13)	62 (17)	69 (21)	72 (22)	68 (20)	59 (15)	51 (11)	43 (6)	53 (12)
Source: NOAA

== Ecology ==
According to the A. W. Kuchler U.S. potential natural vegetation types, Deal would have a dominant vegetation type of Appalachian Oak (104) with a dominant vegetation form of Eastern Hardwood Forest (25). The plant hardiness zone is 7a with an average annual extreme minimum air temperature of 3.4 °F (−15.9 °C). The average date of first spring leaf-out is March 24 and fall color typically peaks in early-November.

== Notable people ==
People who were born in, residents of, or otherwise closely associated with Deal include:

- Rudolf Bauer (1889–1953), German-born painter who was involved in the avant-garde group Der Sturm in Berlin, and whose work would become central to the Non-Objective art collection of Solomon R. Guggenheim
- Anita Rowe Block (1915–1979), playwright, novelist, and short story writer
- Brute Force (stage name of Stephen Friedland, born 1940), singer and songwriter
- Joseph Cayre (born 1941), investor and owner of Midtown Equities
- Stanley Chera (1942–2020), real estate developer
- Adela Cojab (born 1996), author and activist advocating against antisemitism and for Zionist causes
- Nadine Epstein, journalist and author. Editor in chief and CEO of Moment magazine
- George K. Fraenkel (1921–2009), physical chemist
- Tom Gallagher (1940–2018), diplomat. In 1976, he became the first officer of the United States Foreign Service to come out as gay
- Frank Hague (1876–1956), Mayor of Jersey City from 1917 to 1947
- Lahav Harkov, journalist who serves as the senior contributing editor and diplomatic correspondent of The Jerusalem Post
- Huntington Hartford (1911–2008), businessman, philanthropist, stage and film producer and art collector. Heir to the A&P supermarket fortune
- Sean T. Kean (born 1963), politician who has represented the 30th Legislative district in the New Jersey General Assembly since 2012
- Albert Laboz, real estate developer
- Willie Moretti (1894–1951), mobster who served as underboss of the Genovese crime family
- David Rockwell (born 1956), architect and designer
- Patti Scialfa (born 1953), member of the E Street Band and wife of Bruce Springsteen
- P. Hal Sims (1886–1949) and Dorothy Rice Sims (1889–1960), contract bridge celebrities and experts whose home in Deal was a headquarters and retreat for authorities on the game, 1920s–1930s
- Joseph Sitt (born 1964), real estate investor, founder of the retail chain Ashley Stewart, and founder of global real estate company Thor Equities
- Maxine Stuart (1918–2013), actress
- Jeff Sutton (born 1960), real estate developer, billionaire, founder of Wharton Properties
- Jeffrey Vinik (born 1959), investor and owner of the NHL's Tampa Bay Lightning

Preceded by Long Branch	Beaches of New Jersey	Succeeded by Allenhurst
