= Interlaken, New Jersey =

Borough in Monmouth County, New Jersey, US

- Borough
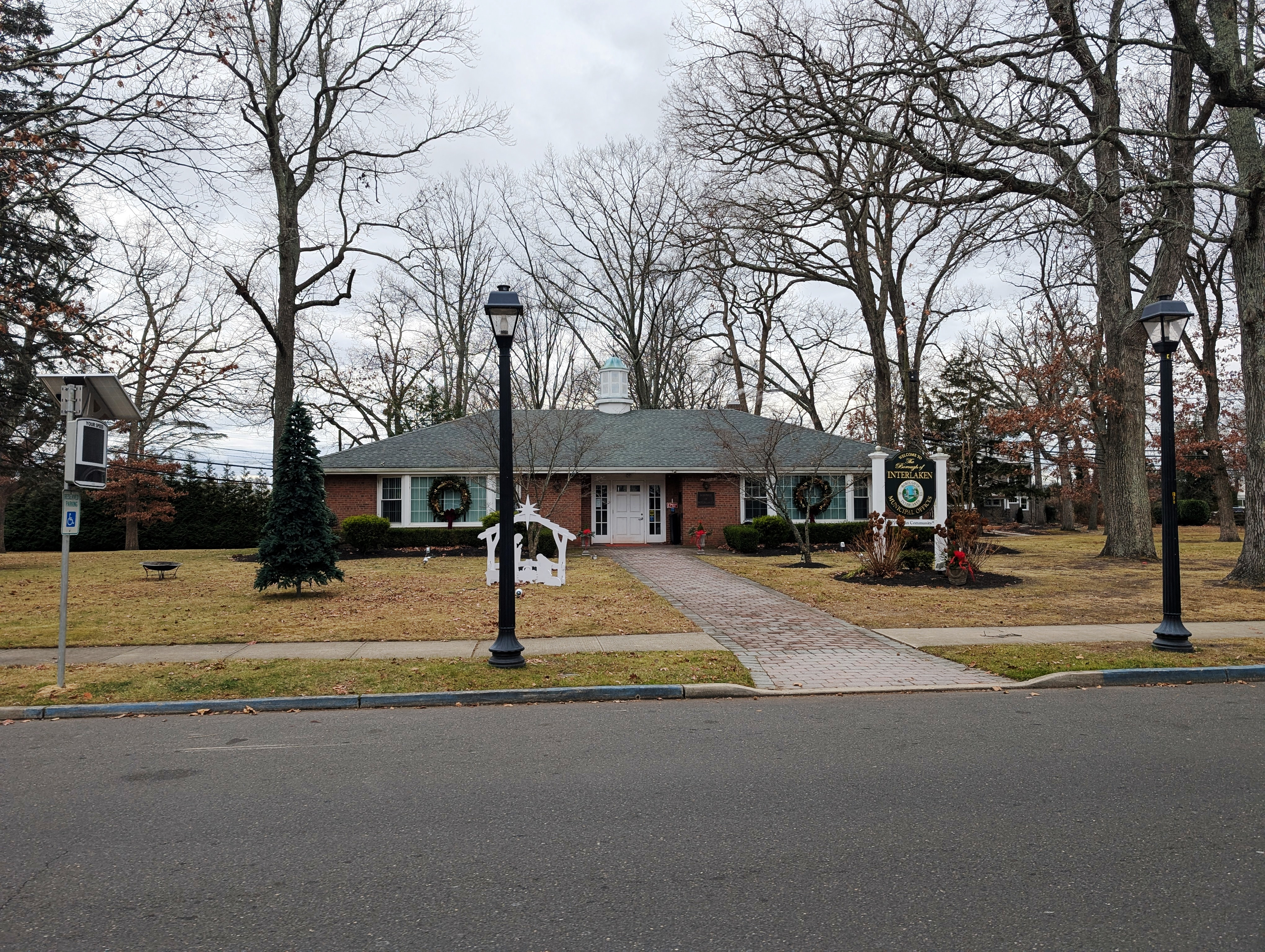
- Interlaken Municipal Offices

- Seal

- Location of Interlaken in Monmouth County circled and highlighted in red (left). Inset map: Location of Monmouth County in New Jersey highlighted in orange (right).

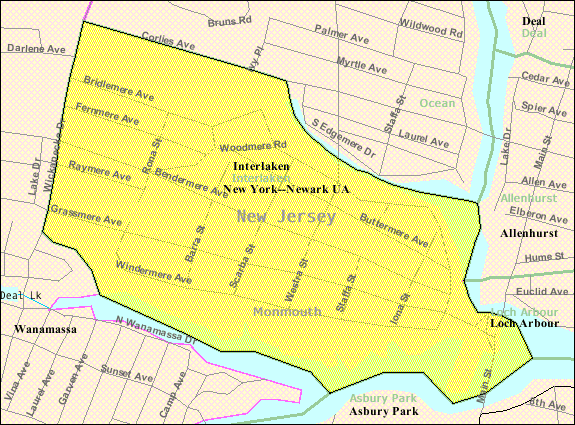
- Census Bureau map of Interlaken, New Jersey

- Location in Monmouth County Location in New Jersey Location in the United States
- Coordinates: 40.234313°N 74.015939°W
- Country: United States
- State: New Jersey
- County: Monmouth
- Incorporated: May 3, 1922
- Named for: Interlaken, Switzerland

Government
  - Type: Borough
  - Body: Borough Council
  - Mayor: Michael Nohilly (R, term ends December 31, 2027)
  - Municipal clerk: Lori Reibrich

Area
  - Total: 0.39 sq mi (1.01 km^{2})
  - Land: 0.33 sq mi (0.86 km^{2})
  - Water: 0.058 sq mi (0.15 km^{2}) 14.62%
  - Rank: 550th of 565 in state 49th of 53 in county
- Elevation: 16 ft (4.9 m)

Population (2020)
  - Total: 828
  - Estimate (2023): 817
  - Rank: 539th of 565 in state 50th of 53 in county
  - Density: 2,499.4/sq mi (965.0/km^{2})
  - Rank: 251st of 565 in state 31st of 53 in county
- Time zone: UTC−05:00 (Eastern (EST))
  - Summer (DST): UTC−04:00 (Eastern (EDT))
- ZIP Code: 07712
- Area code: 732
- FIPS code: 3402534200
- GNIS feature ID: 0885261
- Website: www.interlakenboro.com

Interlaken is a borough situated in the Jersey Shore region, within Monmouth County, in the U.S. state of New Jersey. As of the 2020 United States census, the borough's population was 828, an increase of 8 (+1.0%) from the 2010 census count of 820, which in turn had reflected a decline of 80 (−8.9%) from the 900 counted in the 2000 census.

Interlaken was authorized for prospective incorporation as a borough by an act of the New Jersey Legislature on March 11, 1922, from portions of Ocean Township, subject to approval by a majority of voters in the affected area. Voters approved the incorporation of Interlaken in a referendum held on May 3, 1922.

Interlaken is a dry town where alcohol is not permitted to be sold by law.

== History ==
The area that is now Interlaken was purchased in 1667 by Gavin Drummond from the Lenape Native Americans. It was later part of Ocean Township, which had seceded from Shrewsbury Township in 1849 and included at the time present-day Eatontown, Neptune Township, Neptune City, Avon-by-the-Sea, Bradley Beach, Asbury Park, Allenhurst, Deal, Long Branch, West Long Branch, Loch Arbour, Monmouth Beach, Sea Bright, and Oceanport, along with Interlaken itself.

Dr. Francis Weld, a Boston physician, bought a 364-acre (1.47 km^{2}) tract and named it Interlaken Farm, after Interlaken, a peninsula in Switzerland situated between two lakes, that they had just visited, which was similar to the borough's location between two sections of Deal Lake. Weld established the Interlaken Land Company in 1890 to turn his farm into a residential community with avenues named after English lakes and cross streets named after the islands in the Hebrides in the Irish Sea. While the initial effort did not succeed, the Stormfelz-Lovely-Neville Company was hired in 1905 to continue the building project, and the community began its growth.

Interlaken was formed as a borough on March 11, 1922, based on the results of a referendum held on May 3, 1922. The first mayor and council of Interlaken were seated on June 26, 1922.

Interlaken remains entirely residential, as was originally intended by its developers. The borough had been the only municipality in the state without any businesses, until a day-care center opened in 1992 under the terms of a state law that required approval of child care establishments serving five children or fewer.

== Geography ==
According to the United States Census Bureau, the borough had a total area of 0.39 square miles (1.01 km^{2}), including 0.33 square miles (0.86 km^{2}) of land and 0.06 square miles (0.15 km^{2}) of water (14.62%).

The borough borders the Monmouth County community of Allenhurst, Asbury Park, Loch Arbour and Ocean Township.

Deal Lake covers 158 acres (64 ha) and is overseen by the Deal Lake Commission, which was established in 1974. Seven municipalities border the lake, accounting for 27 miles (43 km) of shoreline, also including Allenhurst, Asbury Park, Deal, Loch Arbour, Neptune Township and Ocean Township.

== Demographics ==
Historical population
Census	Pop.	Note	%±
1930	545		—
1940	787		44.4%
1950	833		5.8%
1960	1,168		40.2%
1970	1,182		1.2%
1980	1,037		−12.3%
1990	910		−12.2%
2000	900		−1.1%
2010	820		−8.9%
2020	828		1.0%
2023 (est.)	817	▼	−1.3%
Population sources:1930 1940–2000 2000; 2010 2020

=== 2020 census ===
The 2020 United States Census counted...

=== 2010 census ===
The 2010 United States census counted 820 people, 361 households, and 237 families in the borough. The population density was 2,482.3 per square mile (958.4/km^{2}). There were 393 housing units at an average density of 1,189.7 per square mile (459.3/km^{2}). The racial makeup was 98.41% (807) White, 0.00% (0) Black or African American, 0.00% (0) Native American, 0.49% (4) Asian, 0.00% (0) Pacific Islander, 0.37% (3) from other races, and 0.73% (6) from two or more races. Hispanic or Latino of any race were 1.71% (14) of the population.

Of the 361 households, 18.3% had children under the age of 18; 58.7% were married couples living together; 5.5% had a female householder with no husband present and 34.3% were non-families. Of all households, 26.3% were made up of individuals and 16.3% had someone living alone who was 65 years of age or older. The average household size was 2.27 and the average family size was 2.76.

14.5% of the population were under the age of 18, 4.8% from 18 to 24, 14.5% from 25 to 44, 39.6% from 45 to 64, and 26.6% who were 65 years of age or older. The median age was 54.3 years. For every 100 females, the population had 90.3 males. For every 100 females ages 18 and older there were 90.0 males.

The Census Bureau's 2006–2010 American Community Survey showed that (in 2010 inflation-adjusted dollars) median household income was $116,000 (with a margin of error of +/− $16,207) and the median family income was $137,500 (+/− $17,077). Males had a median income of $116,250 (+/− $10,733) versus $60,833 (+/− $21,986) for females. The per capita income for the borough was $72,484 (+/− $11,388). About 2.7% of families and 2.1% of the population were below the poverty line, including none of those under age 18 and 4.2% of those age 65 or over.

=== 2000 census ===
As of the 2000 United States census there were 900 people, 386 households, and 260 families residing in the borough. The population density was 2,556.2 inhabitants per square mile (987.0/km^{2}). There were 397 housing units at an average density of 1,127.6 per square mile (435.4/km^{2}). The racial makeup of the borough was 98.67% White, 0.22% Asian, 0.11% Pacific Islander, and 1.00% from two or more races. Hispanic or Latino of any race were 1.11% of the population.

There were 386 households, out of which 21.0% had children under the age of 18 living with them, 59.1% were married couples living together, 6.7% had a female householder with no husband present, and 32.4% were non-families. 27.5% of all households were made up of individuals, and 15.8% had someone living alone who was 65 years of age or older. The average household size was 2.33 and the average family size was 2.86.

In the borough the population was spread out, with 17.9% under the age of 18, 4.0% from 18 to 24, 21.9% from 25 to 44, 33.4% from 45 to 64, and 22.8% who were 65 years of age or older. The median age was 48 years. For every 100 females, there were 93.5 males. For every 100 females age 18 and over, there were 89.0 males.

The median income for a household in the borough was $82,842, and the median income for a family was $104,618. Males had a median income of $81,203 versus $59,063 for females. The per capita income for the borough was $47,307. About 1.5% of families and 3.0% of the population were below the poverty line, including 3.7% of those under age 18 and 2.0% of those age 65 or over.

== Government ==
=== Local government ===
Interlaken is governed under the borough form of New Jersey municipal government, which is used in 218 municipalities (of the 564) statewide, making it the most common form of government in New Jersey. The governing body is comprised of the mayor and the borough council, with all positions elected at-large on a partisan basis as part of the November general election. A mayor is elected directly by the voters to a four-year term of office. The borough council is comprised of six members elected to serve three-year terms on a staggered basis, with two seats coming up for election each year in a three-year cycle. The borough form of government used by Interlaken is a "weak mayor / strong council" government in which council members act as the legislative body with the mayor presiding at meetings and voting only in the event of a tie. The mayor can veto ordinances subject to an override by a two-thirds majority vote of the council. The mayor makes committee and liaison assignments for council members, and most appointments are made by the mayor with the advice and consent of the council.

As of 2025, the mayor of Interlaken is Republican Michael Nohilly, whose term of office ends on December 31, 2027. Members of the Borough Council are Council President John Rush Butler (R, 2025), Leonard Blasucci Jr. (R, 2025), Michael Delia (R, 2024), Michael DeSarno (R, 2027), Mervin Franks (R, 2026), Daniel T. Griffin (D, 2027) and Mindy Horowitz (R, 2026).

In July 2018, the borough council selected Rick Menditto to fill the seat expiring in December 2020 that had been held by Republican John Gunn until he resignedfrom office the previous month. In the November 2018 general election, Democrat Arthur Fama defeated Menditto and was elected to serve the balance of the term of office.

In September 2016, the borough council selected John Rush Butler to fill the vacant seat expiring in December 2016 that had been held by Keith Miller until his resignation earlier that month; Butler will serve on an interim basis until the November 2016 general election, when voters will choose a candidate to serve the balance of the term of office.

=== Federal, state and county representation ===
Interlaken is located in the 6th Congressional District and is part of New Jersey's 11th state legislative district.

For the 119th United States Congress, New Jersey's 6th congressional district is represented by Frank Pallone (D, Long Branch). New Jersey is represented in the United States Senate by Democrats Cory Booker (Newark, term ends 2027) and Andy Kim (Moorestown, term ends 2031).

For the 2026–2027 session, the 11th legislative district of the New Jersey Legislature is represented in the New Jersey Senate by Vin Gopal (D, Long Branch) and in the General Assembly by Margie Donlon (D, Ocean Township) and Luanne Peterpaul (D, Long Branch).

Monmouth County is governed by a Board of County Commissioners composed of five members who are elected at-large to serve three-year terms of office on a staggered basis, with either one or two seats up for election each year as part of the November general election. At an annual reorganization meeting held in the beginning of January, the board selects one of its members to serve as director and another as deputy director.

As of 2025, Monmouth County's Commissioners are Director Thomas A. Arnone (R, Neptune City, 2025), Susan M. Kiley (R, Hazlet Township, 2027), Erik Anderson (R, Shrewsbury, 2026), Nick DiRocco (R, Wall Township, 2025), and Deputy Director Ross F. Licitra (R, Marlboro Township, 2026).

Constitutional officers elected on a countywide basis are Clerk Christine Giordano Hanlon (R, 2025; Ocean Township), Sheriff Shaun Golden (R, 2025; Howell Township) and Surrogate Rosemarie D. Peters (R, 2026; Middletown Township).

=== Politics ===
United States presidential election results for Interlaken
Year	Republican		Democratic		Third party(ies)	
Year	No.	%	No.	%	No.	%
2024	293	45.78%	337	52.66%	10	1.56%
2020	320	46.24%	366	52.89%	6	0.87%
2016	298	49.92%	272	45.56%	27	4.52%
2012	362	61.46%	224	38.03%	3	0.51%
2008	379	60.54%	235	37.54%	12	1.92%
2004	372	59.52%	245	39.20%	8	1.28%
2000	352	57.42%	244	39.80%	17	2.77%
1996	298	56.12%	202	38.04%	31	5.84%
1992	330	56.03%	181	30.73%	78	13.24%

As of March 2011, there were a total of 749 registered voters in Interlaken, of which 183 (24.4%) were registered as Democrats, 371 (49.5%) were registered as Republicans and 195 (26.0%) were registered as Unaffiliated. There were no voters registered to other parties.

In the 2012 presidential election, Republican Mitt Romney received 61.5% of the vote (362 cast), ahead of Democrat Barack Obama with 38.0% (224 votes), and other candidates with 0.5% (3 votes), among the 595 ballots cast by the borough's 781 registered voters (6 ballots were spoiled), for a turnout of 76.2%. In the 2008 presidential election, Republican John McCain received 59.6% of the vote (379 cast), ahead of Democrat Barack Obama with 36.9% (235 votes) and other candidates with 1.9% (12 votes), among the 636 ballots cast by the borough's 766 registered voters, for a turnout of 83.0%. In the 2004 presidential election, Republican George W. Bush received 59.0% of the vote (372 ballots cast), outpolling Democrat John Kerry with 38.8% (245 votes) and other candidates with 1.0% (8 votes), among the 631 ballots cast by the borough's 776 registered voters, for a turnout percentage of 81.3.

Gubernatorial election results for Interlaken
Year	Republican		Democratic		Third party(ies)	
Year	No.	%	No.	%	No.	%
2025	270	47.96%	291	51.69%	2	0.36%
2021	266	52.99%	233	46.41%	3	0.60%
2017	233	54.44%	184	42.99%	11	2.57%
2013	383	75.54%	118	23.27%	6	1.18%
2009	360	64.52%	150	26.88%	48	8.60%
2005	290	58.59%	194	39.19%	11	2.22%

In the 2013 gubernatorial election, Republican Chris Christie received 75.4% of the vote (383 cast), ahead of Democrat Barbara Buono with 23.4% (119 votes), and other candidates with 1.2% (6 votes), among the 523 ballots cast by the borough's 774 registered voters (15 ballots were spoiled), for a turnout of 67.6%. In the 2009 gubernatorial election, Republican Chris Christie received 63.5% of the vote (360 ballots cast), ahead of Democrat Jon Corzine with 26.5% (150 votes), Independent Chris Daggett with 7.9% (45 votes) and other candidates with 0.5% (3 votes), among the 567 ballots cast by the borough's 760 registered voters, yielding a 74.6% turnout.

United States Senate election results for Interlaken1
Year	Republican		Democratic		Third party(ies)	
Year	No.	%	No.	%	No.	%
2024	299	47.31%	323	51.11%	10	1.58%
2018	271	50.47%	246	45.81%	20	3.72%
2012	354	62.54%	207	36.57%	5	0.88%
2006	273	59.22%	180	39.05%	8	1.74%

United States Senate election results for Interlaken2
Year	Republican		Democratic		Third party(ies)	
Year	No.	%	No.	%	No.	%
2020	333	48.76%	344	50.37%	6	0.88%
2014	216	54.41%	176	44.33%	5	1.26%
2013	171	56.62%	125	41.39%	6	1.99%
2008	371	62.35%	216	36.30%	8	1.34%

== Education ==
Students from Interlaken attend the West Long Branch Public Schools, which serve students in pre-kindergarten through eighth grade. Interlaken is a non-operating school district; as part of a sending/receiving relationship, students attend on a tuition basis along with students from Allenhurst, New Jersey, and Loch Arbour, New Jersey, each with its own sending/receiving relationship. As of the 2021–22 school year, the district, comprised of two schools, had an enrollment of 551 students and 61.5 classroom teachers (on an FTE basis), for a student–teacher ratio of 9.0:1. Schools in the district (with 2021–22 enrollment data from the National Center for Education Statistics) are Betty McElmon Elementary School with 330 students in pre-Kindergarten through fourth grade and Frank Antonides School with 214 students in fifth through eighth grades.

For ninth through twelfth grades, public school students attend Shore Regional High School, a regional high school located in West Long Branch that also serves students from the constituent districts of Monmouth Beach, Oceanport, Sea Bright and West Long Branch. As of the 2021–22 school year, the high school had an enrollment of 613 students and 55.7 classroom teachers (on an FTE basis), for a student–teacher ratio of 11.0:1.

== Transportation ==
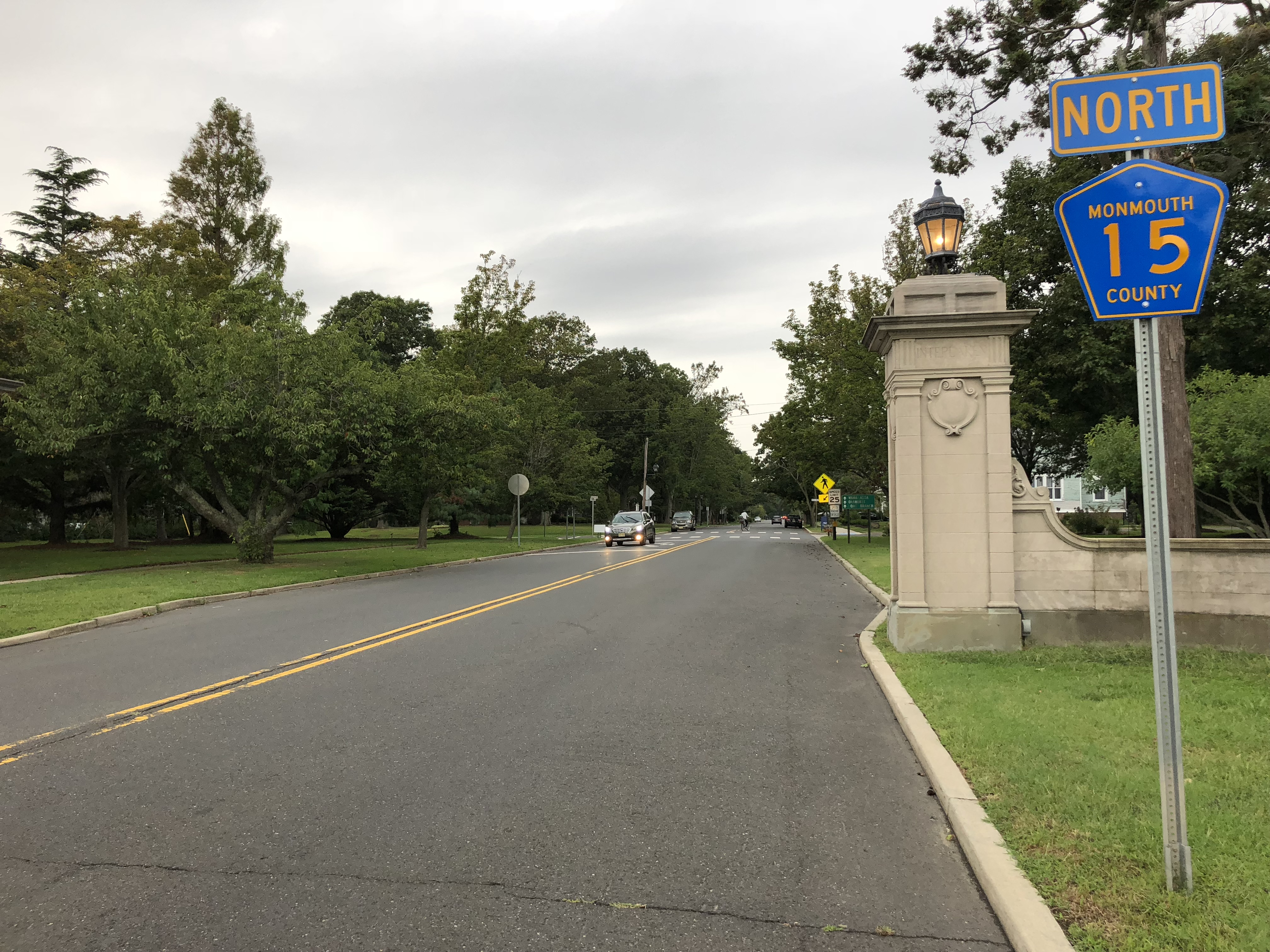
County Route 15 northbound (Grassmere Avenue westbound) entering Interlaken

As of May 2010, the borough had a total of 6.77 miles (10.90 km) of roadways, of which 5.84 miles (9.40 km) were maintained by the municipality and 0.93 miles (1.50 km) by Monmouth County.

No major highways directly serve Interlaken, with only minor roads such as County Route 15 passing directly through the borough. Route 18, Route 35, Route 66 and Route 71 are accessible in its neighboring communities. The Garden State Parkway is also not too far away.

== Notable people ==
People who were born in, residents of, or otherwise closely associated with Interlaken:

- Danny DeVito (born 1944), television and film actor who had a vacation home in Interlaken
- Fred J. Cook (1911–2003), investigative journalist, author and historian
- Jack Ford, television news personality specializing in legal commentary
- Rhea Perlman (born 1948), actress known for playing head waitress Carla Tortelli in the sitcom Cheers
