= Loch Arbour, New Jersey =

Borough in Monmouth County, New Jersey, US

- Village
- Incorporated Village of Loch Arbour
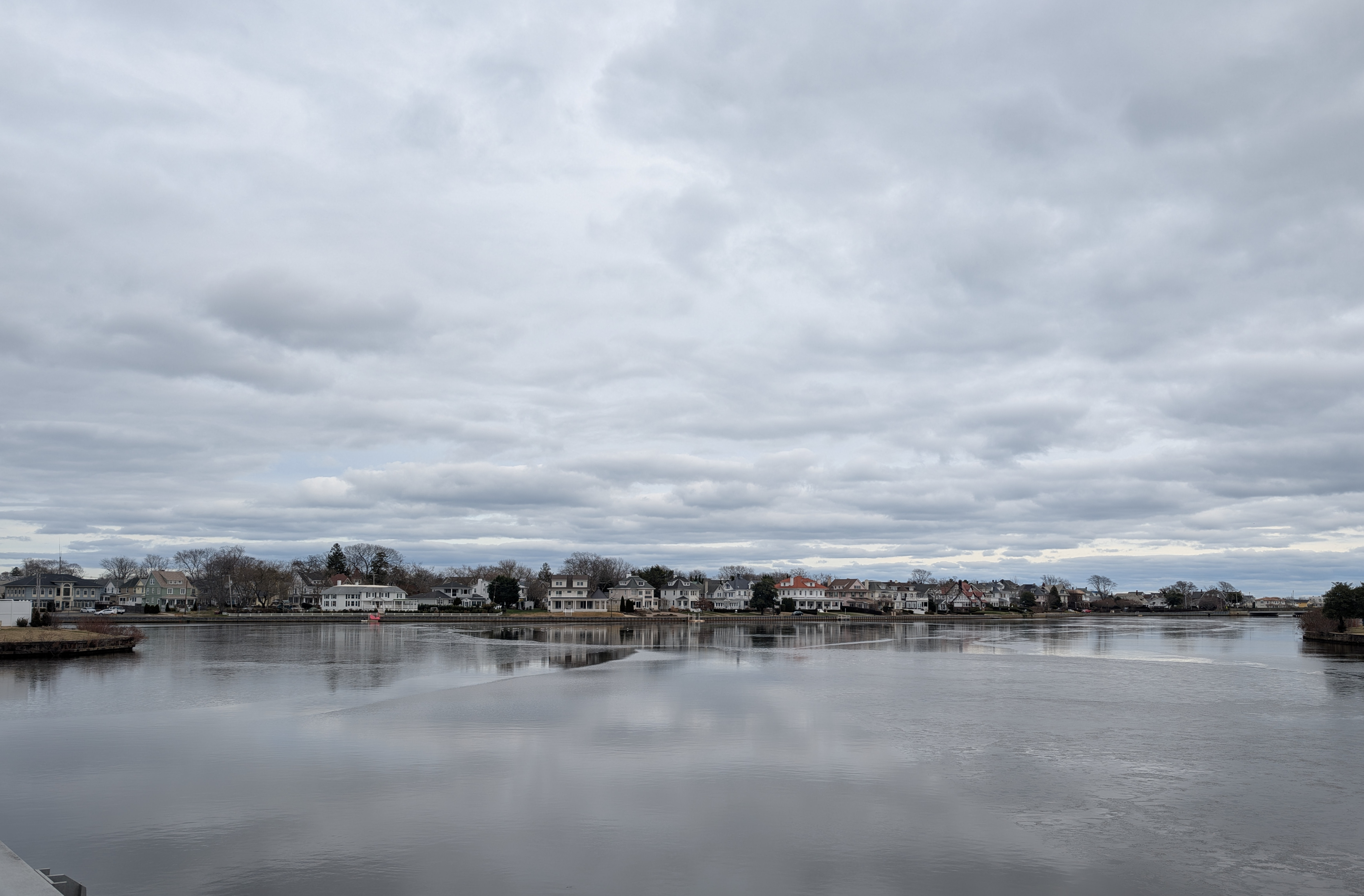
- View of Loch Arbour across Deal Lake

- Seal

- Location of Loch Arbour in Monmouth County highlighted in red (left). Inset map: Location of Monmouth County in New Jersey highlighted in orange (right).

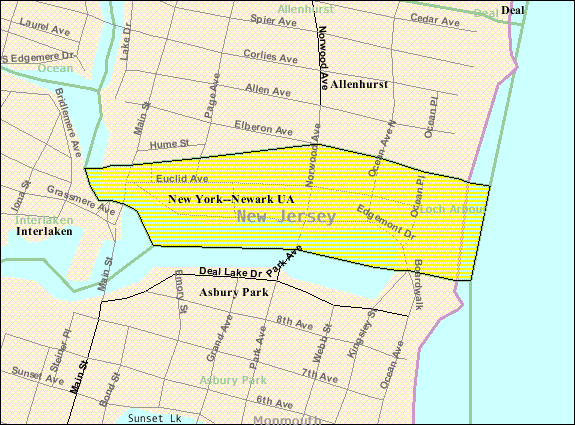
- Census Bureau map of Loch Arbour, New Jersey

- Location in Monmouth County Location in New Jersey Location in the United States
- Coordinates: 40.232296°N 74.000008°W
- Country: United States
- State: New Jersey
- County: Monmouth
- Incorporated: April 23, 1957
- Named for: Lochaber, Scotland

Government
  - Type: Walsh Act
  - Body: Board of Trustees
  - Mayor: Saul M. Tawil (term ends May 2028)
  - Municipal clerk: Marilyn Simons

Area
  - Total: 0.14 sq mi (0.35 km^{2})
  - Land: 0.085 sq mi (0.22 km^{2})
  - Water: 0.046 sq mi (0.12 km^{2}) 36.15%
  - Rank: 563rd of 565 in state 52nd of 53 in county
- Elevation: 10 ft (3.0 m)

Population (2020)
  - Total: 224
  - Estimate (2023): 224
  - Rank: 561st of 565 in state 53rd of 53 in county
  - Density: 2,581.6/sq mi (996.8/km^{2})
  - Rank: 244th of 565 in state 29th of 53 in county
- Time zone: UTC−05:00 (Eastern (EST))
  - Summer (DST): UTC−04:00 (Eastern (EDT))
- ZIP Code: 07711
- Area code: 732 exchanges: 517, 531, 660, 663
- FIPS code: 3402541010
- GNIS feature ID: 0885283
- Website: www.locharbournj.us

Loch Arbour is a village situated on the Jersey Shore in Monmouth County, in the U.S. state of New Jersey. As of the 2020 United States census, the village's population was 224, an increase of 30 (+15.5%) from the 2010 census count of 194, which had in turn reflected a decline of 86 (−30.7%) from the 280 recorded at the 2000 census.

In 2020, Loch Arbour was the third-smallest municipality in New Jersey in terms of area (behind Shrewsbury Township and East Newark) and was the fifth-smallest municipality by population in the state of New Jersey.

== History ==
Loch Arbour was incorporated as a village by an act of the New Jersey Legislature on April 23, 1957, from portions of Ocean Township, based on the results of a referendum held that same day. The borough was named after Lochaber, Scotland.

Its formation was driven by efforts to build beachfront condominiums in the area. Residents who sought to prevent the development led the secession, taking with them the last portion of oceanfront property in what The New York Times described as "the now ironically-named Ocean Township."

In 1997, Loch Arbour voters rejected a ballot proposal that would have it merge back into Ocean Township by an 88–69 margin, and proposals to merge with Allenhurst or Interlaken failed by a nearly 10–1 margin.

A ballot proposal in 2011 again considered a merger with Allenhurst, citing a potential reduction in property taxes for residents. In 2012, Loch Arbour officials held discussions with their counterparts in Allenhurst towards a plan in which the two municipalities would merge, subject to approval by the councils of both communities and approval of a referendum by voters in both Loch Arbour and Allenhurst. The merger drive was driven by property taxes paid to the Ocean Township School District, a relationship that would be ended by the merger, under which the combined municipality would send students at lower cost to the Asbury Park Public Schools.

While there are four municipalities that retain the Village type of government (Loch Arbour, Ridgefield Park, Ridgewood and South Orange), none of them still use the Village form of government. Loch Arbour was the last to do so, but on December 20, 2011, its residents voted to change from having a form with five village trustees to the Walsh Act form of government, under which Loch Arbour is governed by a three-member board of commissioners.

In 1892, James J. Corbett set up his training camp in Loch Arbour for the bout with John L. Sullivan in which Corbett won the world heavyweight boxing championship.

== Geography ==
According to the United States Census Bureau, the village had a total area of 0.13 square miles (0.35 km^{2}), including 0.09 square miles (0.22 km^{2}) of land and 0.05 square miles (0.12 km^{2}) of water (36.15%).

The village is located along the Atlantic Ocean in eastern Monmouth County and is bordered to the north by the Borough of Allenhurst, to the west by the borough of Interlaken and to the south by the City of Asbury Park.

Deal Lake covers 158 acres (64 ha) which is overseen by the Deal Lake Commission, which was established in 1974. Seven municipalities border the lake, accounting for 27 miles (43 km) of shoreline, including Allenhurst, Asbury Park, Deal, Interlaken, Neptune Township and Ocean Township.

== Demographics ==
Historical population
Census	Pop.	Note	%±
1960	297		—
1970	395		33.0%
1980	369		−6.6%
1990	380		3.0%
2000	280		−26.3%
2010	194		−30.7%
2020	224		15.5%
2023 (est.)	224	Steady	0.0%
Population sources: 1960–1990 2000; 2010 2020

=== 2010 census ===
The 2010 United States census counted 194 people, 82 households, and 53 families in the village. The population density was 1,928.2 per square mile (744.5/km^{2}). There were 159 housing units at an average density of 1,580.4 per square mile (610.2/km^{2}). The racial makeup was 94.85% (184) White, 1.55% (3) Black or African American, 0.00% (0) Native American, 1.55% (3) Asian, 0.00% (0) Pacific Islander, 0.52% (1) from other races, and 1.55% (3) from two or more races. Hispanic or Latino of any race were 3.61% (7) of the population.

Of the 82 households, 28.0% had children under the age of 18; 52.4% were married couples living together; 8.5% had a female householder with no husband present and 35.4% were non-families. Of all households, 29.3% were made up of individuals and 6.1% had someone living alone who was 65 years of age or older. The average household size was 2.37 and the average family size was 2.91.

19.6% of the population were under the age of 18, 6.7% from 18 to 24, 13.9% from 25 to 44, 44.3% from 45 to 64, and 15.5% who were 65 years of age or older. The median age was 49.0 years. For every 100 females, the population had 102.1 males. For every 100 females ages 18 and older there were 108.0 males.

The Census Bureau's 2006–2010 American Community Survey showed that (in 2010 inflation-adjusted dollars) median household income was $120,000 (with a margin of error of +/− $62,957) and the median family income was $119,167 (+/− $20,917). Males had a median income of $73,500 (+/− $27,181) versus $92,500 (+/− $38,683) for females. The per capita income for the borough was $60,575 (+/− $9,229). None of the population were below the poverty line.

=== 2000 census ===
As of the 2000 United States census there were 280 people, 120 households, and 77 families residing in the village. The population density was 2,894.0 inhabitants per square mile (1,117.4/km^{2}). There were 156 housing units at an average density of 1,612.4 per square mile (622.6/km^{2}). The racial makeup of the village was 95.00% White, 2.14% African American, 0.71% Asian, 0.36% from other races, and 1.79% from two or more races. Hispanic or Latino of any race were 0.71% of the population.

There were 120 households, out of which 20.0% had children under the age of 18 living with them, 54.2% were married couples living together, 7.5% had a female householder with no husband present, and 35.8% were non-families. 27.5% of all households were made up of individuals, and 3.3% had someone living alone who was 65 years of age or older. The average household size was 2.33 and the average family size was 2.88.

In the village, the population was spread out, with 17.5% under the age of 18, 6.1% from 18 to 24, 30.0% from 25 to 44, 30.7% from 45 to 64, and 15.7% who were 65 years of age or older. The median age was 43 years. For every 100 females, there were 105.9 males. For every 100 females age 18 and over, there were 102.6 males.

The median income for a household in the village was $68,542, and the median income for a family was $74,250. Males had a median income of $61,964 versus $41,250 for females. The per capita income for the village was $34,037. None of the families and 4.8% of the population were living below the poverty line.

== Government ==
=== Local government ===
Since 2011, the Loch Arbour has been governed under the Walsh Act form of government. The village is one of 30 municipalities (of the 564) statewide that use this commission form of government. The governing body is comprised of a Board of Commissioners, whose three members are chosen by the voters at-large on a non-partisan basis to serve concurrent three-year terms of office as part of the May municipal election. At a reorganization meeting held after each election, each commissioner is assigned a department to oversee and administer, and the commissioners select one of their members to serve as mayor and another as deputy mayor. In December 2011, residents voted to switch from the Village form to the current Walsh Act form of government.

As of 2025, members of Loch Arbour's Board of Trustees are Mayor Saul M. Tawil (Commissioner of Revenue and Finance), Deputy Mayor Jack D. Hedaya (Commissioner of Public Works, Parks and Public Property) and Jason Elo (Commissioner of Public Affairs and Public Safety), all of whom are serving concurrent terms of office ending May 31, 2028.

=== Federal, state, and county representation ===
Loch Arbour is located in the 6th Congressional District and is part of New Jersey's 11th state legislative district.

For the 119th United States Congress, New Jersey's 6th congressional district is represented by Frank Pallone (D, Long Branch). New Jersey is represented in the United States Senate by Democrats Cory Booker (Newark, term ends 2027) and Andy Kim (Moorestown, term ends 2031).

For the 2026–2027 session, the 11th legislative district of the New Jersey Legislature is represented in the New Jersey Senate by Vin Gopal (D, Long Branch) and in the General Assembly by Margie Donlon (D, Ocean Township) and Luanne Peterpaul (D, Long Branch).

Monmouth County is governed by a Board of County Commissioners composed of five members who are elected at-large to serve three-year terms of office on a staggered basis, with either one or two seats up for election each year as part of the November general election. At an annual reorganization meeting held in the beginning of January, the board selects one of its members to serve as director and another as deputy director.

As of 2025, Monmouth County's Commissioners are Director Thomas A. Arnone (R, Neptune City, 2025), Susan M. Kiley (R, Hazlet Township, 2027), Erik Anderson (R, Shrewsbury, 2026), Nick DiRocco (R, Wall Township, 2025), and Deputy Director Ross F. Licitra (R, Marlboro Township, 2026).

Constitutional officers elected on a countywide basis are Clerk Christine Giordano Hanlon (R, 2025; Ocean Township), Sheriff Shaun Golden (R, 2025; Howell Township) and Surrogate Rosemarie D. Peters (R, 2026; Middletown Township).

=== Politics ===
United States presidential election results for Loch Arbour
Year	Republican		Democratic		Third party(ies)	
Year	No.	%	No.	%	No.	%
2024	118	66.67%	57	32.20%	2	1.13%
2020	52	41.94%	71	57.26%	1	0.81%
2016	53	49.53%	49	45.79%	5	4.67%
2012	68	56.67%	51	42.50%	1	0.83%
2008	73	51.41%	67	47.18%	2	1.41%
2004	106	58.24%	74	40.66%	2	1.10%
2000	80	47.34%	71	42.01%	18	10.65%
1996	64	47.06%	61	44.85%	11	8.09%
1992	81	48.80%	62	37.35%	23	13.86%

As of March 2011, there were a total of 160 registered voters in Loch Arbour, of which 54 (33.8%) were registered as Democrats, 42 (26.3%) were registered as Republicans and 64 (40.0%) were registered as Unaffiliated. There were no voters registered to other parties.

In the 2012 presidential election, Republican Mitt Romney received 56.7% of the vote (68 cast), ahead of Democrat Barack Obama with 42.5% (51 votes), and other candidates with 0.8% (1 vote), among the 121 ballots cast by the village's 164 registered voters (1 ballot was spoiled), for a turnout of 73.8%. In the 2008 presidential election, Republican John McCain received 51.4% of the vote (73 cast), ahead of Democrat Barack Obama with 47.2% (67 votes) and other candidates with 1.4% (2 votes), among the 142 ballots cast by the village's 186 registered voters, for a turnout of 76.3%. In the 2004 presidential election, Republican George W. Bush received 57.6% of the vote (106 ballots cast), outpolling Democrat John Kerry with 40.2% (74 votes) and other candidates with 0.9% (2 votes), among the 184 ballots cast by the village's 231 registered voters, for a turnout percentage of 79.7.

Gubernatorial election results for Loch Arbour
Year	Republican		Democratic		Third party(ies)	
Year	No.	%	No.	%	No.	%
2025	85	59.03%	57	39.58%	2	1.39%
2021	42	50.00%	42	50.00%	0	0.00%
2017	44	49.44%	39	43.82%	6	6.74%
2013	54	65.06%	28	33.73%	1	1.20%
2009	75	62.50%	30	25.00%	15	12.50%
2005	68	50.00%	56	41.18%	12	8.82%

In the 2013 gubernatorial election, Republican Chris Christie received 65.1% of the vote (54 cast), ahead of Democrat Barbara Buono with 33.7% (28 votes), and other candidates with 1.2% (1 vote), among the 85 ballots cast by the village's 166 registered voters (2 ballots were spoiled), for a turnout of 51.2%. In the 2009 gubernatorial election, Republican Chris Christie received 62.0% of the vote (75 ballots cast), ahead of Democrat Jon Corzine with 24.8% (30 votes), Independent Chris Daggett with 11.6% (14 votes) and other candidates with 0.8% (1 votes), among the 121 ballots cast by the village's 168 registered voters, yielding a 72.0% turnout.

United States Senate election results for Loch Arbour1
Year	Republican		Democratic		Third party(ies)	
Year	No.	%	No.	%	No.	%
2024	110	64.71%	56	32.94%	4	2.35%
2018	44	42.72%	57	55.34%	2	1.94%
2012	72	61.54%	43	36.75%	2	1.71%
2006	3	33.33%	6	66.67%	0	0.00%

United States Senate election results for Loch Arbour2
Year	Republican		Democratic		Third party(ies)	
Year	No.	%	No.	%	No.	%
2020	58	46.40%	66	52.80%	1	0.80%
2014	39	52.70%	31	41.89%	4	5.41%
2013	37	58.73%	26	41.27%	0	0.00%
2008	63	48.84%	65	50.39%	1	0.78%

== Education ==
Since the 1960s, Loch Arbour had been a part of the Ocean Township School District, a consolidated public school district serving students in kindergarten through twelfth grade from both Loch Arbour and Ocean Township.

At the end of the 2016–2017 school year, Loch Arbour left the Ocean Township district after getting approval from the New Jersey Department of Education and the approval of a referendum by over 95% of voters. With 14 public school students and school property taxes of $2 million, Loch Arbour had been paying an average of $143,000 per pupil under the old arrangement, while Ocean Township residents paid only $16,000 per pupil. Under new sending/receiving relationships established with the West Long Branch district for Pre-K–8 and Shore Regional for 9–12, Loch Arbour pays tuition to each district based on the number of students.

The West Long Branch Public Schools serves students in pre-kindergarten through eighth grade. Students from Allenhurst and Interlaken also attend the district's school as part of sending/receiving relationships, in which students attend on a tuition basis. As of the 2021–22 school year, the district, comprised of two schools, had an enrollment of 551 students and 61.5 classroom teachers (on an FTE basis), for a student–teacher ratio of 9.0:1. Schools in the district (with 2021–22 enrollment data from the National Center for Education Statistics) are Betty McElmon Elementary School with 330 students in pre-Kindergarten through fourth grade and Frank Antonides School with 214 students in fifth through eighth grades.

For ninth through twelfth grades, public school students attend Shore Regional High School, a regional high school located in West Long Branch that also serves students from the constituent districts of Monmouth Beach, Oceanport and Sea Bright. The high school is part of the Shore Regional High School District. As of the 2021–22 school year, the high school had an enrollment of 613 students and 55.7 classroom teachers (on an FTE basis), for a student–teacher ratio of 11.0:1.

== Transportation ==
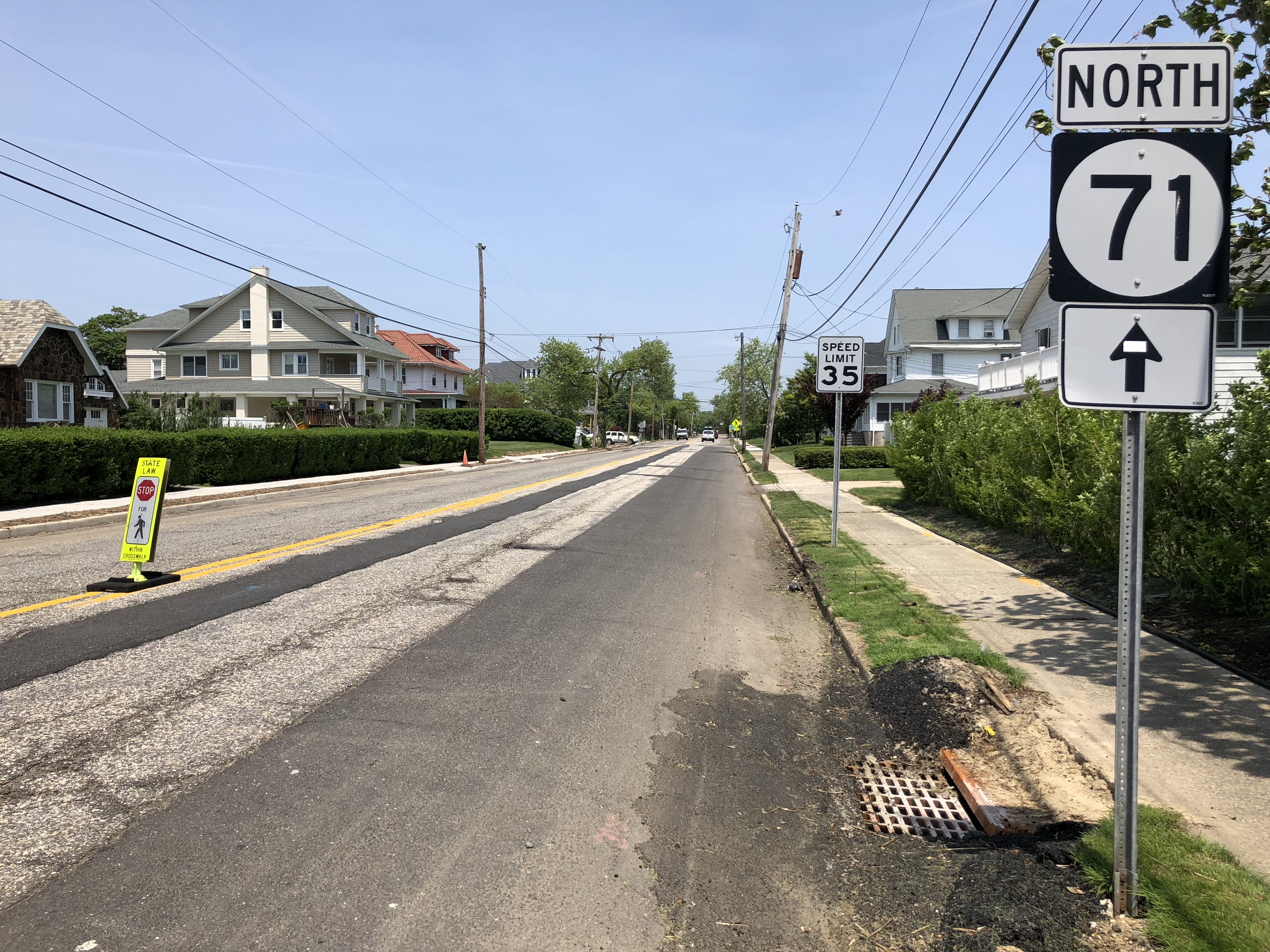
Route 71 is the main highway through Loch Arbour

=== Roads and highways ===
As of May 2010, the village had a total of 2.04 miles (3.28 km) of roadways, of which 1.82 miles (2.93 km) were maintained by the municipality and 0.22 miles (0.35 km) by the New Jersey Department of Transportation.

Route 71 is the main access road that passes north–south through the village.

Loch Arbour is one hour south of New York City and east of Philadelphia. The closest limited access road is Route 18, and both Interstate 195 and the Garden State Parkway are at least 15 minutes away.

=== Public transportation ===
As of July 2010, NJ Transit served the village on the 837 (New Jersey bus) route.

NJ Transit train service is available nearby at the Allenhurst station in neighboring Allenhurst. Commuter rail service is available on the North Jersey Coast Line, which passes through, but does not stop, in Loch Arbour.

== Climate ==
According to the Köppen climate classification system, Loch Arbour has a humid subtropical climate (Cfa). Cfa climates are characterized by all months having an average temperature above 32.0 °F (0.0 °C), at least four months with an average temperature at or above 50.0 °F (10.0 °C), at least one month with an average temperature at or above 71.6 °F (22.0 °C) and no significant precipitation difference between seasons. Although most summer days are slightly humid with a cooling afternoon sea breeze in Loch Arbour, episodes of heat and high humidity can occur with heat index values above 103 °F (39 °C). Since 1981, the highest air temperature was 100.3 °F (37.9 °C) on August 9, 2001, and the highest daily average mean dew point was 77.4 °F (25.2 °C) on August 13, 2016. July is the peak in thunderstorm activity and the average wettest month is August. Since 1981, the wettest calendar day was August 27, 2011, with 5.60 inches (14 cm) of rain. During the winter months, the average annual extreme minimum air temperature is 3.7 °F (−15.7 °C). Since 1981, the coldest air temperature was −6.0 °F (−21.1 °C) on January 22, 1984. Episodes of extreme cold and wind can occur with wind chill values below −6 °F (−21 °C). The average seasonal (November–April) snowfall total is 18 to 24 inches (46 to 61 cm), and the average snowiest month is February which corresponds with the annual peak in nor'easter activity.

Climate data for Loch Arbour, 1981–2010 normals, extremes 1981–2019
Month	Jan	Feb	Mar	Apr	May	Jun	Jul	Aug	Sep	Oct	Nov	Dec	Year
Record high °F (°C)	71.4 (21.9)	78.9 (26.1)	82.4 (28.0)	88.3 (31.3)	95.1 (35.1)	97.0 (36.1)	100.0 (37.8)	100.3 (37.9)	97.5 (36.4)	94.0 (34.4)	80.5 (26.9)	75.0 (23.9)	100.3 (37.9)
Mean daily maximum °F (°C)	40.0 (4.4)	42.6 (5.9)	49.1 (9.5)	58.7 (14.8)	68.2 (20.1)	77.4 (25.2)	82.8 (28.2)	81.6 (27.6)	75.4 (24.1)	65.0 (18.3)	55.2 (12.9)	45.2 (7.3)	61.9 (16.6)
Daily mean °F (°C)	32.5 (0.3)	34.8 (1.6)	40.9 (4.9)	50.3 (10.2)	59.9 (15.5)	69.4 (20.8)	74.9 (23.8)	73.9 (23.3)	67.4 (19.7)	56.4 (13.6)	47.3 (8.5)	37.7 (3.2)	53.9 (12.2)
Mean daily minimum °F (°C)	24.9 (−3.9)	26.9 (−2.8)	32.7 (0.4)	41.9 (5.5)	51.6 (10.9)	61.3 (16.3)	67.1 (19.5)	66.1 (18.9)	59.3 (15.2)	47.8 (8.8)	39.4 (4.1)	30.2 (−1.0)	45.9 (7.7)
Record low °F (°C)	−6.0 (−21.1)	0.9 (−17.3)	5.7 (−14.6)	18.3 (−7.6)	34.9 (1.6)	44.6 (7.0)	48.3 (9.1)	45.4 (7.4)	39.0 (3.9)	26.2 (−3.2)	14.9 (−9.5)	−0.4 (−18.0)	−6.0 (−21.1)
Average precipitation inches (mm)	3.62 (92)	3.07 (78)	3.91 (99)	4.16 (106)	3.85 (98)	3.59 (91)	4.69 (119)	4.76 (121)	3.64 (92)	3.96 (101)	3.84 (98)	4.02 (102)	47.11 (1,197)
Average relative humidity (%)	64.6	61.5	60.5	61.8	66.0	70.0	69.9	71.2	71.3	69.4	67.3	65.0	66.6
Average dew point °F (°C)	21.9 (−5.6)	22.9 (−5.1)	28.3 (−2.1)	37.7 (3.2)	48.5 (9.2)	59.2 (15.1)	64.4 (18.0)	64.0 (17.8)	57.8 (14.3)	46.5 (8.1)	37.0 (2.8)	27.0 (−2.8)	43.0 (6.1)
Source: PRISM

Climate data for Sandy Hook, NJ Ocean Water Temperature (16 N Loch Arbour)
Month	Jan	Feb	Mar	Apr	May	Jun	Jul	Aug	Sep	Oct	Nov	Dec	Year
Daily mean °F (°C)	37 (3)	36 (2)	40 (4)	46 (8)	55 (13)	62 (17)	69 (21)	72 (22)	68 (20)	59 (15)	51 (11)	43 (6)	53 (12)
Source: NOAA

== Ecology ==
According to the A. W. Kuchler U.S. potential natural vegetation types, Loch Arbour would have a dominant vegetation type of Appalachian Oak (104) with a dominant vegetation form of Eastern Hardwood Forest (25). The plant hardiness zone is 7a with an average annual extreme minimum air temperature of 3.7 °F (−15.7 °C). The average date of first spring leaf-out is March 24 and fall color typically peaks in early-November.

== Notable people ==
People who were born in, residents of, or otherwise closely associated with Loch Arbour include:

- Peter Dobson (born 1964), actor with a cameo role in Forrest Gump as Elvis Presley
- Radia Perlman (born 1951), inventor of the Spanning Tree Protocol
- Alfred and Rosemary Podgis, murdered in their Loch Arbour home in 1982

Preceded by Allenhurst	Beaches of New Jersey	Succeeded by Asbury Park
