= Allenhurst, New Jersey =

Borough in Monmouth County, New Jersey, US

- Borough
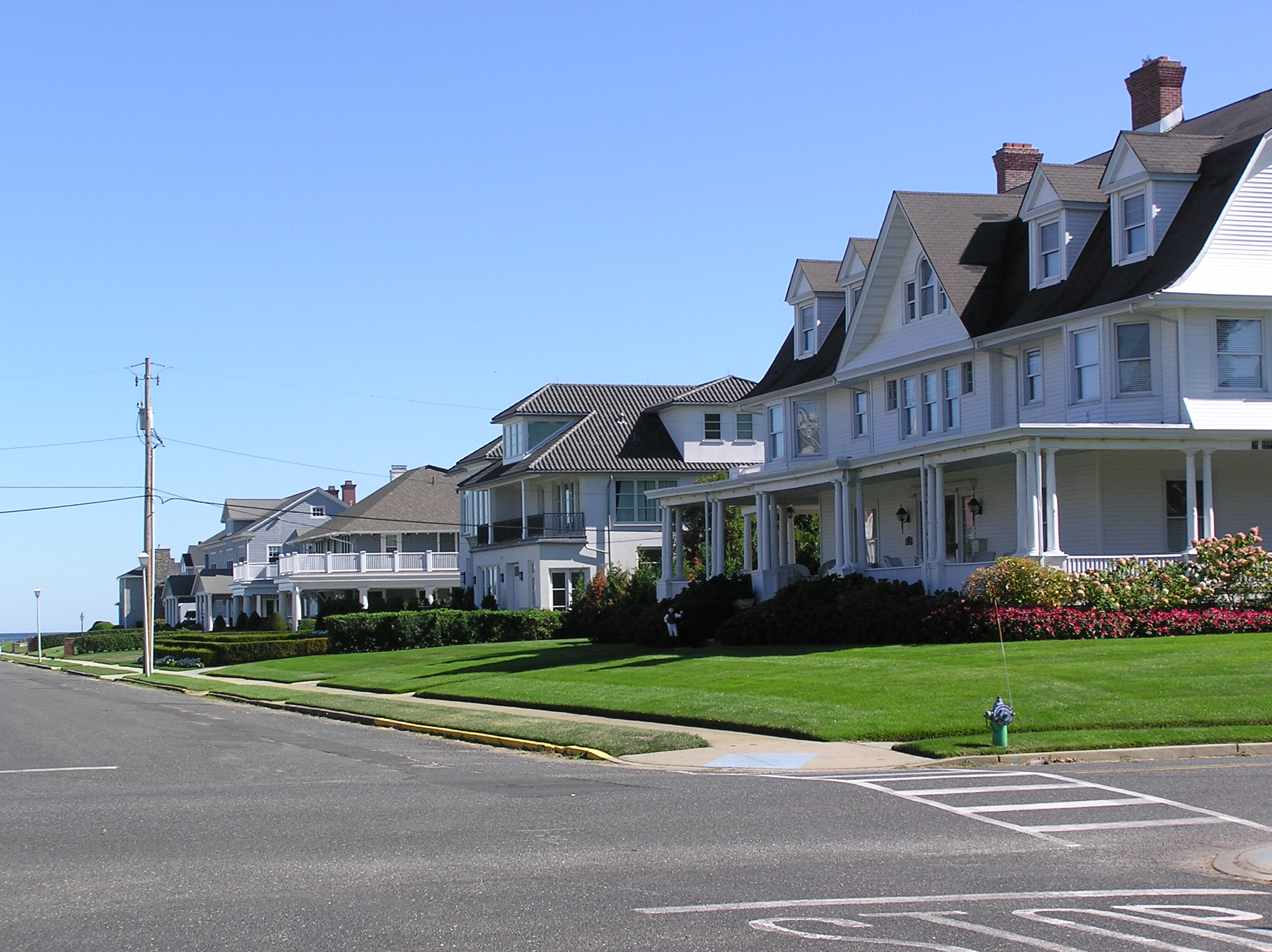
- The Allenhurst Residential Historic District, at the Jersey Shore

- Seal

- Location of Allenhurst in Monmouth County circled and highlighted in red (left). Inset map: Location of Monmouth County in New Jersey highlighted in orange (right).

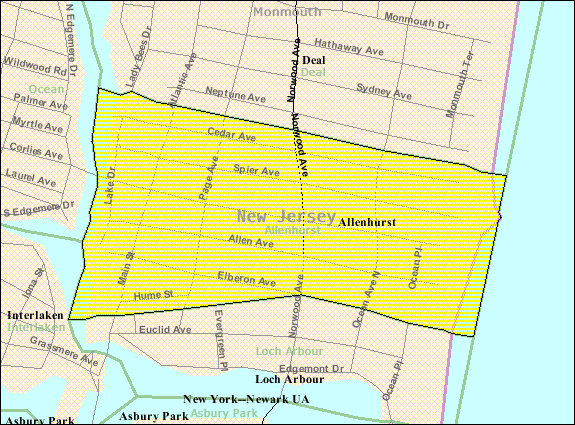
- Census Bureau map of Allenhurst, New Jersey

- Location in Monmouth County Location in New Jersey Location in the United States
- Coordinates: 40.235945°N 74.002417°W
- Country: United States
- State: New Jersey
- County: Monmouth
- Incorporated: April 26, 1897
- Named for: Abner Allen

Government
  - Type: Walsh Act
  - Body: Board of Commissioners
  - Mayor: Frieda O. Adjmi (term ends May 2028)
  - Municipal Clerk: Donna Campagna

Area
  - Total: 0.28 sq mi (0.73 km^{2})
  - Land: 0.25 sq mi (0.65 km^{2})
  - Water: 0.031 sq mi (0.08 km^{2}) 11.43%
  - Rank: 554th of 565 in state 50th of 53 in county
- Elevation: 23 ft (7.0 m)

Population (2020)
  - Total: 472
  - Estimate (2023): 466
  - Rank: 553rd of 565 in state 52nd of 53 in county
  - Density: 1,884.4/sq mi (727.6/km^{2})
  - Rank: 303rd of 565 in state 38th of 53 in county
- Time zone: UTC−05:00 (Eastern (EST))
  - Summer (DST): UTC−04:00 (Eastern (EDT))
- ZIP Codes: 07711
- Area codes: 732 exchanges: 517, 531, 660, 663
- FIPS code: 3402500730
- GNIS feature ID: 0885136
- Website: www.allenhurstnj.org

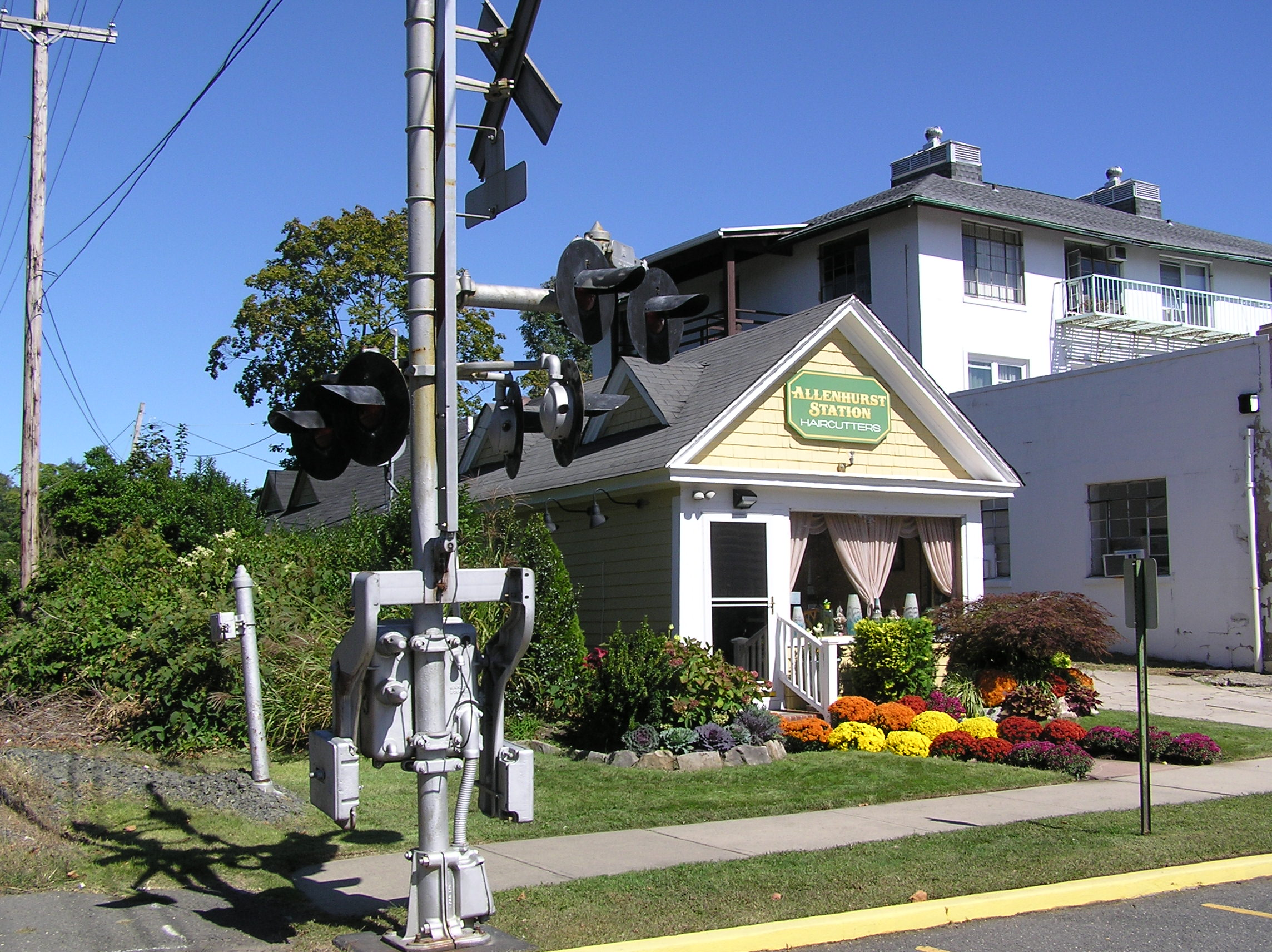
The historic Allenhurst Railroad Station

Allenhurst is a borough located on the Jersey Shore, in Monmouth County, in the U.S. state of New Jersey. The settlement was named after resident Abner Allen and was incorporated as a borough by an act of the New Jersey Legislature on April 26, 1897, from portions of Ocean Township. As of the 2020 United States census, the borough's population was 472, a decrease of 24 (−4.8%) from the 2010 census count of 496, which in turn reflected a decline of 222 (−30.9%) from the 718 counted in the 2000 census.

Bordered by the Atlantic Ocean to the east and Deal Lake to the west, it is in close proximity to New York City and is a stop on the NJ Transit North Jersey Coast Line. The borough is at the center of a string of wealthy communities between Long Branch and Asbury Park with many historic homes built during the late 19th and early 20th centuries.

In 2006, Allenhurst ranked 131st in Forbes magazine's list of the most expensive ZIP Codes in the United States.

== History ==
Allenhurst "reflects the history of development from a rural area to a suburb and resort town of New York City. In 1895, the 120-acre (49 ha) Allen farm was bought by the Coast Land Improvement Company in order to build an exclusive resort community to attract upper class summer residents. The proximity of Allenhurst to the rail line was significant in the growth and popularity of Allenhurst, allowing residents of New York City easier access to the community."

On April 26, 1897, Allenhurst was incorporated as a borough by an act of the New Jersey Legislature from portions of Ocean Township. The borough is situated in the center of a string of wealthy communities between Long Branch and Asbury Park. The borough was named for resident Abner Allen.

During the late 19th and early 20th centuries many historic homes were built in Victorian, Queen Anne, Italian Renaissance Revival, Tudor Revival, Prairie, Mission Revival, American Craftsman, Shingle, Colonial Revival, Neoclassical and Gothic Revival architectural styles. Local ordinances overseen by an historic preservation commission have ensured the preservation of historical architecture by enforcing strict guidelines for the renovation of older homes.

In 2006, Allenhurst ranked 131st in Forbes magazine's list of the most expensive ZIP Codes in the United States. In the magazine's 2012 rankings, the borough was ranked 448th, with a median price of $665,043.

After Hurricane Sandy had devastated the shoreline in October 2012, the U.S. Army Corps of Engineers (USACE) in 2015 pumped sand onto the beaches, which contained unexploded ordinance in the form of hundreds of fusing components for World War I-era artillery. From December 2016 until March 2017, USACE Baltimore District specialists in munitions and explosives removed 362 chap-stick-sized potentially live pieces, mostly boosters, which had most likely been disposed of as excess after World War I, and are not uncommon at Gateway's Sandy Hook Unit. "Not only was Fort Hancock an active military base until 1974, but also the proving ground of the U.S. Army from 1874 until 1919."

=== Historic district ===
- Allenhurst Residential Historic District
- U.S. National Register of Historic Places
- U.S. Historic district
- New Jersey Register of Historic Places
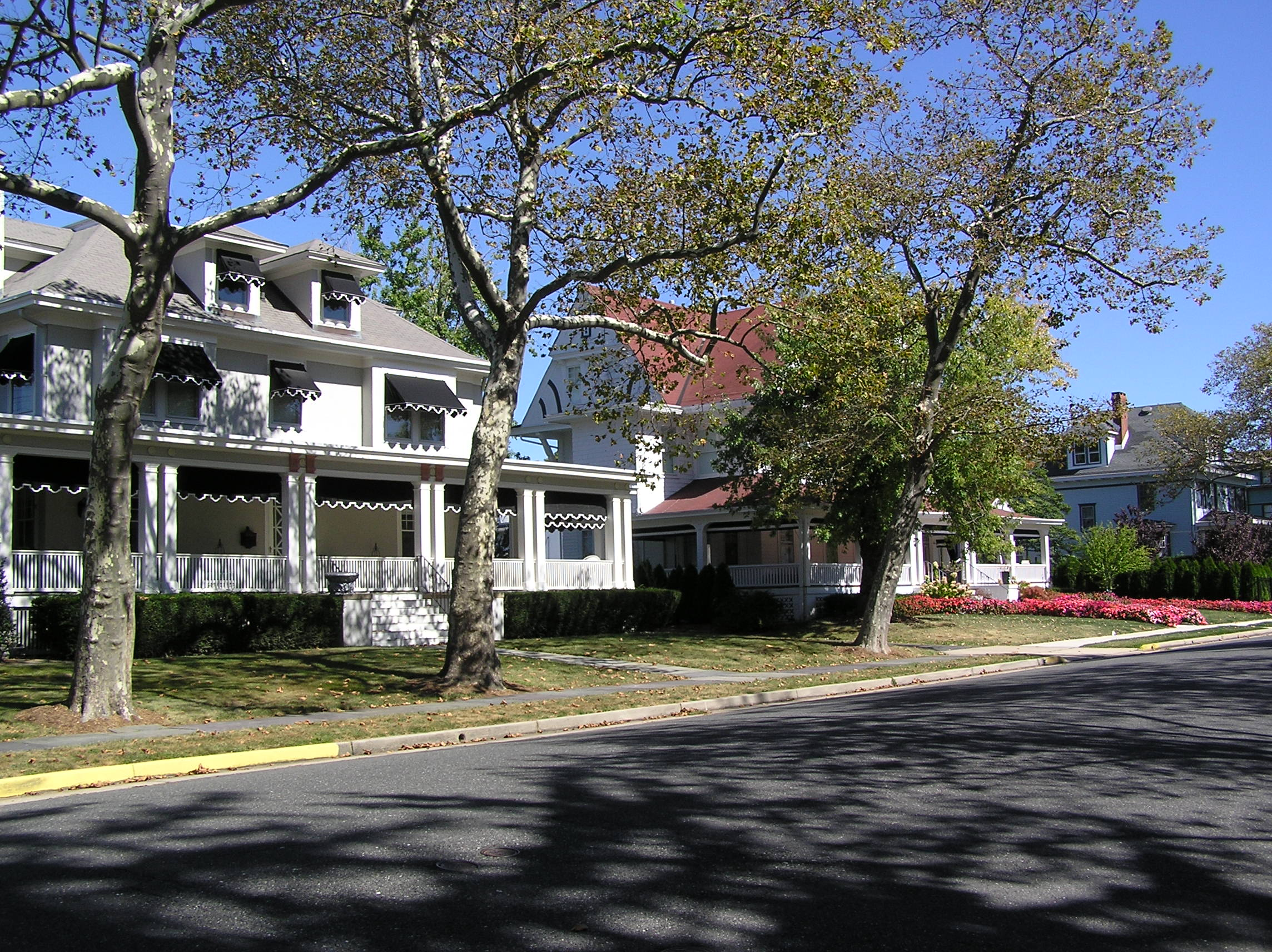
- Location: Roughly bounded by the Atlantic Ocean, Main Street, Cedar Avenue, Hume Street and Elberon Avenue
- Area: 115 acres (47 ha)
- Built: 1895
- Architect: Ernest A. Arend
- Architectural style: Late Victorian, Late 19th And 20th Century Revivals
- NRHP reference No.: 10000353
- NJRHP No.: 4963

Significant dates
- Added to NRHP: June 18, 2010
- Designated NJRHP: February 18, 2010

The Allenhurst Residential Historic District is a historic district roughly bounded by the Atlantic Ocean, Main Street, Cedar Avenue, Hume Street and Elberon Avenue. The district was added to the National Register of Historic Places on June 18, 2010, for its significance in architecture. It includes 412 contributing buildings.

== Geography ==
According to the United States Census Bureau, the borough had a total area of 0.28 square miles (0.73 km^{2}), including 0.25 square miles (0.65 km^{2}) of land and 0.03 square miles (0.08 km^{2}) of water (11.43%).

The borough borders the Atlantic Ocean to the east, Deal Lake to the west, and is in close proximity to New York City. The borough borders the Monmouth County municipalities of Deal, Interlaken, Loch Arbour and Ocean Township.

The beachfront is characterized by two groynes, known to locals as "Crackup" and "The L". "The L" was featured in Scuba Diving magazine as one of New Jersey's premier shore diving locations.

Deal Lake covers 158 acres (64 ha), overseen by the Deal Lake Commission, established in 1974. Seven municipalities border the lake, accounting for 27 miles (43 km) of shoreline, also including Asbury Park, Deal, Interlaken, Loch Arbour, Neptune Township and Ocean Township.

== Demographics ==
Historical population
Census	Pop.	Note	%±
1900	165		—
1910	306		85.5%
1920	343		12.1%
1930	573		67.1%
1940	520		−9.2%
1950	758		45.8%
1960	795		4.9%
1970	1,012		27.3%
1980	912		−9.9%
1990	759		−16.8%
2000	718		−5.4%
2010	496		−30.9%
2020	472		−4.8%
2023 (est.)	466	▼	−1.3%
Population sources: 1900–1920 1900–1910; 1910–1930 1940–2000; 2000 2010 2020

=== 2020 census ===
The 2020 United States census counted 472 people, 346 housing units, and 181 families in the borough. The population density was 1,884.4 per square mile (727.6/km^{2}). The racial makeup was 92.58% (437) White, 0.85% (4) Black or African American, 0.00% (0) Native American, 0.64% (3) Asian, 0.00% (0) Pacific Islander, 0.85% (4) from some other race alone, and 5.08% (24) from two or more races. Hispanic or Latino of any race were 4.03% (19) of the population.

*additional census data tbc*

=== 2010 census ===
The 2010 United States census counted 496 people, 217 households, and 115 families in the borough. The population density was 1,887.9 per square mile (728.9/km^{2}). There were 365 housing units at an average density of 1,389.3 per square mile (536.4/km^{2}). The racial makeup was 94.76% (470) White, 1.01% (5) Black or African American, 0.00% (0) Native American, 1.01% (5) Asian, 0.00% (0) Pacific Islander, 1.41% (7) from other races, and 1.81% (9) from two or more races. Hispanic or Latino of any race were 4.44% (22) of the population.

Of the 217 households, 16.1% had children under the age of 18; 44.2% were married couples living together; 6.0% had a female householder with no husband present and 47.0% were non-families. Of all households, 37.3% were made up of individuals and 12.0% had someone living alone who was 65 years of age or older. The average household size was 2.29 and the average family size was 3.11.

15.3% of the population were under the age of 18, 9.1% from 18 to 24, 23.4% from 25 to 44, 32.5% from 45 to 64, and 19.8% who were 65 years of age or older. The median age was 47.2 years. For every 100 females, the population had 105.8 males. For every 100 females ages 18 and older there were 103.9 males.

The Census Bureau's 2006–2010 American Community Survey showed that (in 2010 inflation-adjusted dollars) median household income was $79,250 (with a margin of error of +/− $41,438) and the median family income was $131,500 (+/− $30,872). Males had a median income of $71,944 (+/− $75,722) versus $44,625 (+/− $3,762) for females. The per capita income for the borough was $63,707 (+/− $14,113). About 3.2% of families and 3.5% of the population were below the poverty line, including none of those under age 18 and 8.9% of those age 65 or over.

=== 2000 census ===
As of the 2000 United States census there were 718 people, 285 households, and 188 families residing in the borough. The population density was 2,750.6 inhabitants per square mile (1,062.0/km^{2}). There were 370 housing units at an average density of 1,417.4 per square mile (547.3/km^{2}). The racial makeup of the borough was 97.35% White, 0.84% African American, 0.28% Native American, 0.42% Asian, 0.14% from other races, and 0.97% from two or more races. Hispanic or Latino of any race were 2.51% of the population.

There were 285 households, out of which 23.9% had children under the age of 18 living with them, 55.8% were married couples living together, 6.7% had a female householder with no husband present, and 33.7% were non-families. 24.9% of all households were made up of individuals, and 7.0% had someone living alone who was 65 years of age or older. The average household size was 2.52 and the average family size was 3.08.

In the borough the population was spread out, with 28.9% under the age of 18, 5.7% from 18 to 24, 28.8% from 25 to 44, 27.9% from 45 to 64, and 18.7% who were 65 years of age or older. The median age was 42 years. For every 100 females, there were 106.3 males. For every 100 females age 18 and over, there were 96.0 males.

The median income for a household in the borough was $85,000, and the median income for a family was $109,180. Males had a median income of $70,625 versus $32,171 for females. The per capita income for the borough was $42,710. About 1.0% of families and 3.8% of the population were below the poverty line, including 1.6% of those under age 18 and 2.1% of those age 65 or over.

== Parks and recreation ==
The Allenhurst Beach Club, a 2,450-member recreational facility, has attracted residents and visitors during the summer months for generations. As of 2013 it featured a 525,000-US-gallon (1,990,000 L; 437,000 imp gal) salt water swimming pool, a children's wading pool, cabanas and bathhouses. New membership is no longer open to non-residents according to the borough administration. On Labor Day weekend, the Allenhurst Beach Club hosts the annual "Dye the Ocean Green" to mark the end of the summer season in Allenhurst.

== Government ==
=== Local government ===
Since 1916, Allenhurst has been governed by a three-member Commission, under the terms of the Walsh Act. The borough is one of 30 municipalities (of the 564) statewide that use the commission form of government. The governing body is comprised of the three-member Board of Commissioners, whose members are elected at-large in non-partisan elections to serve four-year terms of office on a concurrent basis as part of the May municipal election. Each Commissioner is assigned responsibility for a specified department within the Borough; one of the commissioners is chosen to serve as mayor and another as deputy mayor.

As of 2024, the members of Allenhurst's Board of Commissioners are Mayor Frieda O. Adjmi (Commissioner of Public Works, Parks and Public Property), Deputy Mayor Theresa Manziano-Santoro (Commissioner of Revenue and Finance) and Joseph R. Dweck (Commissioner of Public Affairs and Public Safety), all serving concurrent terms of office ending in May 2028.

=== Federal, state and county representation ===
Allenhurst is located in the 6th Congressional district and is part of New Jersey's 11th state legislative district.

For the 119th United States Congress, New Jersey's 6th congressional district is represented by Frank Pallone (D, Long Branch). New Jersey is represented in the United States Senate by Democrats Cory Booker (Newark, term ends 2027) and Andy Kim (Moorestown, term ends 2031).

For the 2026–2027 session, the 11th legislative district of the New Jersey Legislature is represented in the New Jersey Senate by Vin Gopal (D, Long Branch) and in the General Assembly by Margie Donlon (D, Ocean Township) and Luanne Peterpaul (D, Long Branch).

Monmouth County is governed by a Board of County Commissioners composed of five members who are elected at-large to serve three-year terms of office on a staggered basis, with either one or two seats up for election each year as part of the November general election. At an annual reorganization meeting held in the beginning of January, the board selects one of its members to serve as director and another as deputy director.

As of 2026, Monmouth County's Commissioners are Director Thomas A. Arnone (R, Neptune City, 2028),Deputy Director Nick DiRocco (R, Wall Township, 2028), Susan M. Kiley (R, Hazlet Township, 2027), Erik Anderson (R, Shrewsbury, 2026), and Ross F. Licitra (R, Marlboro Township, 2026).

Constitutional officers elected on a countywide basis are Clerk Christine Giordano Hanlon (R, 2030; Ocean Township), Sheriff Shaun Golden (R, 2028; Howell Township) and Surrogate Maureen Raisch (R, 2026; Middletown Township).

=== Politics ===
Presidential election results

United States presidential election results for Allenhurst
Year	Republican		Democratic		Third party(ies)	
Year	No.	%	No.	%	No.	%
2024	275	73.73%	87	23.32%	11	2.95%
2020	145	53.51%	122	45.02%	4	1.48%
2016	173	60.92%	100	35.21%	11	3.87%
2012	168	60.43%	107	38.49%	3	1.08%
2008	198	60.00%	129	39.09%	3	0.91%
2004	234	62.07%	138	36.60%	5	1.33%
2000	234	55.85%	164	39.14%	21	5.01%
1996	203	53.14%	144	37.70%	35	9.16%
1992	236	57.00%	116	28.02%	62	14.98%
1988	295	73.02%	109	26.98%	0	0.00%
1984	314	73.36%	114	26.64%	0	0.00%
1980	307	70.57%	96	22.07%	32	7.36%
1976	334	66.14%	171	33.86%	0	0.00%
1972	331	69.54%	145	30.46%	0	0.00%
1968	230	58.23%	145	36.71%	20	5.06%
1964	250	55.19%	203	44.81%	0	0.00%
1960	324	69.98%	139	30.02%	0	0.00%
1956	384	86.49%	60	13.51%	0	0.00%
1952	550	88.14%	74	11.86%	0	0.00%
1948	339	76.70%	101	22.85%	2	0.45%
1944	285	71.97%	111	28.03%	0	0.00%
1940	310	76.17%	97	23.83%	0	0.00%
1936	267	60.96%	171	39.04%	0	0.00%
1932	213	59.50%	145	40.50%	0	0.00%
1928	252	70.19%	107	29.81%	0	0.00%
1924	227	83.46%	45	16.54%	0	0.00%
1920	167	76.96%	50	23.04%	0	0.00%
1916	77	64.17%	43	35.83%	0	0.00%
1912	44	38.94%	35	30.97%	34	30.09%
1908	59	67.82%	28	32.18%	0	0.00%
1904	36	70.59%	15	29.41%	0	0.00%
1900	41	91.11%	4	8.89%	0	0.00%

As of March 2011, there were a total of 401 registered voters in Allenhurst, of which 72 (18.0%) were registered as Democrats, 124 (30.9%) were registered as Republicans and 205 (51.1%) were registered as Unaffiliated. There were no voters registered to other parties.

In all 31 presidential elections since its date of incorporation, Allenhurst has voted for the Republican presidential candidate, with all but four candidates from 1900 to 1988 taking at least 60% of the vote. The best showing for a Republican is the 91.11% of the vote received by William McKinley in his 1900 re-election bid. The best result for a Democrat for president is the 45.02% of the vote received by Joe Biden in the 2020 US presidential election.

Gubernatorial election results for Allenhurst
Year	Republican		Democratic		Third party(ies)	
Year	No.	%	No.	%	No.	%
2025	160	70.48%	66	29.07%	1	0.44%
2021	121	64.02%	67	35.45%	1	0.53%
2017	110	62.86%	60	34.29%	5	2.86%
2013	147	82.58%	31	17.42%	0	0.00%
2009	175	72.61%	47	19.50%	19	7.88%
2005	145	59.18%	89	36.33%	11	4.49%

In the 2013 gubernatorial election, Republican Chris Christie received 82.6% of the vote (147 cast), ahead of Democrat Barbara Buono with 17.4% (31 votes), and other candidates receiving no votes, among the 180 ballots cast by the borough's 376 registered voters (2 ballots were spoiled), for a turnout of 47.9%. In the 2009 gubernatorial election, Republican Chris Christie received 72.6% of the vote (175 ballots cast), ahead of Democrat Jon Corzine with 19.5% (47 votes) and Independent Chris Daggett with 7.9% (19 votes) with no votes cast for other candidates, among the 241 ballots cast by the borough's 405 registered voters, yielding a 59.5% turnout.

United States Senate election results for Allenhurst1
Year	Republican		Democratic		Third party(ies)	
Year	No.	%	No.	%	No.	%
2024	260	72.63%	91	25.42%	7	1.96%
2018	120	57.97%	84	40.58%	3	1.45%
2012	172	64.66%	89	33.46%	5	1.88%
2006	147	61.76%	86	36.13%	5	2.10%

United States Senate election results for Allenhurst2
Year	Republican		Democratic		Third party(ies)	
Year	No.	%	No.	%	No.	%
2020	149	55.60%	115	42.91%	4	1.49%
2014	116	66.29%	56	32.00%	3	1.71%
2013	89	68.99%	39	30.23%	1	0.78%
2008	196	63.23%	109	35.16%	5	1.61%

== Education ==
Allenhurst is a non-operating district that does not have any public school facilities of its own. Until the 2017–18 school year, public school students from Allenhurst had exclusively attended the Asbury Park Public Schools in Asbury Park as part of a sending/receiving relationship. In July 2017, the Acting Commissioner of the New Jersey Department of Education authorized the termination of the agreement with Asbury Park, which was replaced with a new relationship with the West Long Branch district for grades K–8 and with Shore Regional for grades 9–12.

The West Long Branch Public Schools serves students in pre-kindergarten through eighth grade from West Long Branch. Students from Interlaken and Loch Arbour also attend the district's school as part of sending/receiving relationships, in which students attend on a tuition basis. As of the 2021–22 school year, the district, comprised of two schools, had an enrollment of 551 students and 61.5 classroom teachers (on an FTE basis), for a student–teacher ratio of 9.0:1. Schools in the district (with 2021–22 enrollment data from the National Center for Education Statistics) are Betty McElmon Elementary School with 330 students in pre-Kindergarten through fourth grade and Frank Antonides School with 214 students in fifth through eighth grades.

For ninth through twelfth grades, public school students attend Shore Regional High School, a regional high school located in West Long Branch that also serves students from the constituent districts of Monmouth Beach, Oceanport and Sea Bright. The high school is part of the Shore Regional High School District. As of the 2021–22 school year, the high school had an enrollment of 613 students and 55.7 classroom teachers (on an FTE basis), for a student–teacher ratio of 11.0:1.

Students also have the option to attend Academy Charter High School in Lake Como, which accepts students on a lottery basis from the communities of Allenhurst, Asbury Park, Avon-by-the-Sea, Belmar, Bradley Beach, Deal, Interlaken and Lake Como.

== Transportation ==
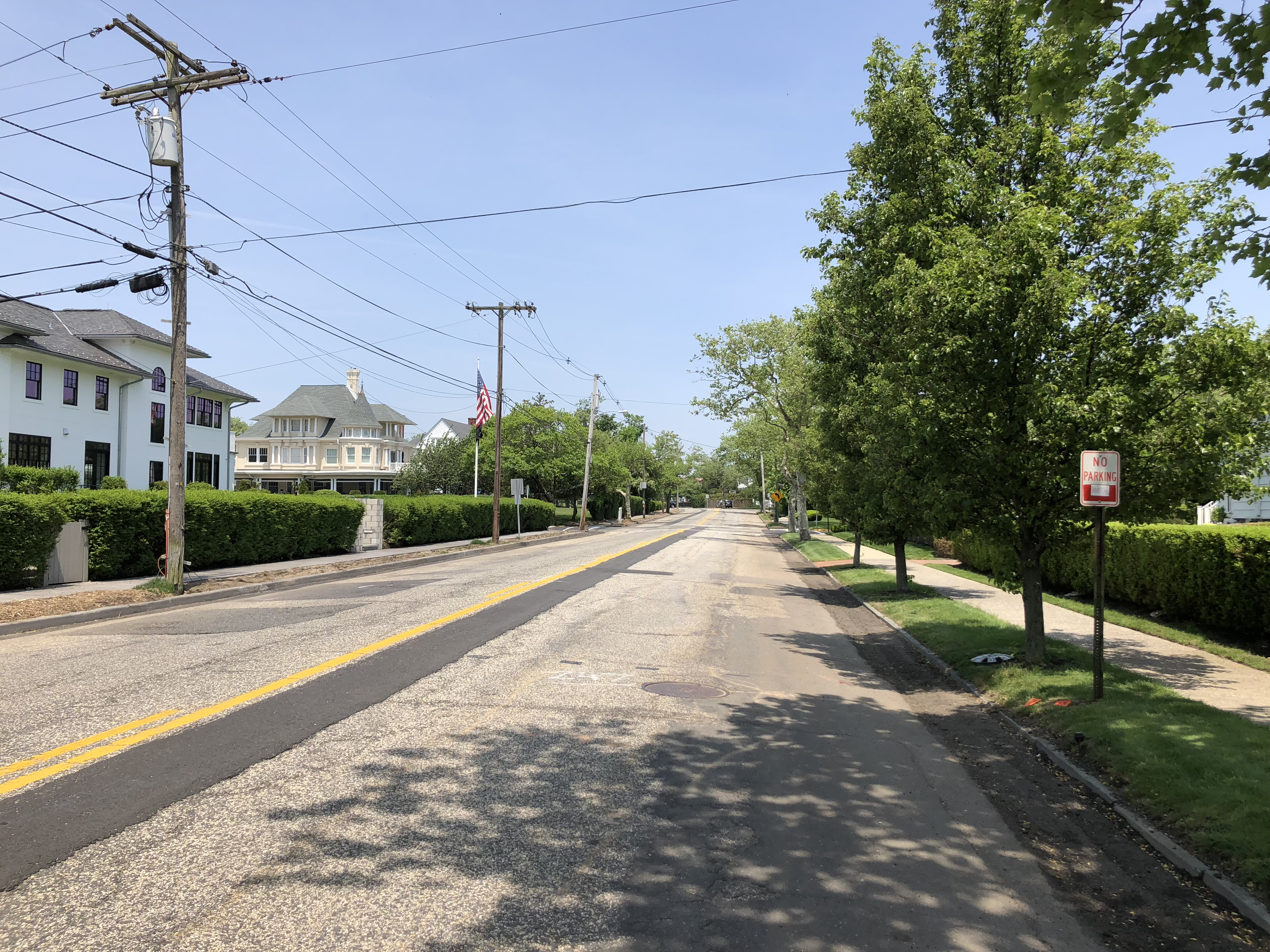
Route 71 in Allenhurst

=== Roads and highways ===
As of May 2010, the borough had a total of 5.14 miles (8.27 km) of roadways, of which 4.73 miles (7.61 km) were maintained by the municipality, 0.08 miles (0.13 km) by Monmouth County and 0.33 miles (0.53 km) by the New Jersey Department of Transportation.

New Jersey Route 71 is the only significant highway in Allenhurst.

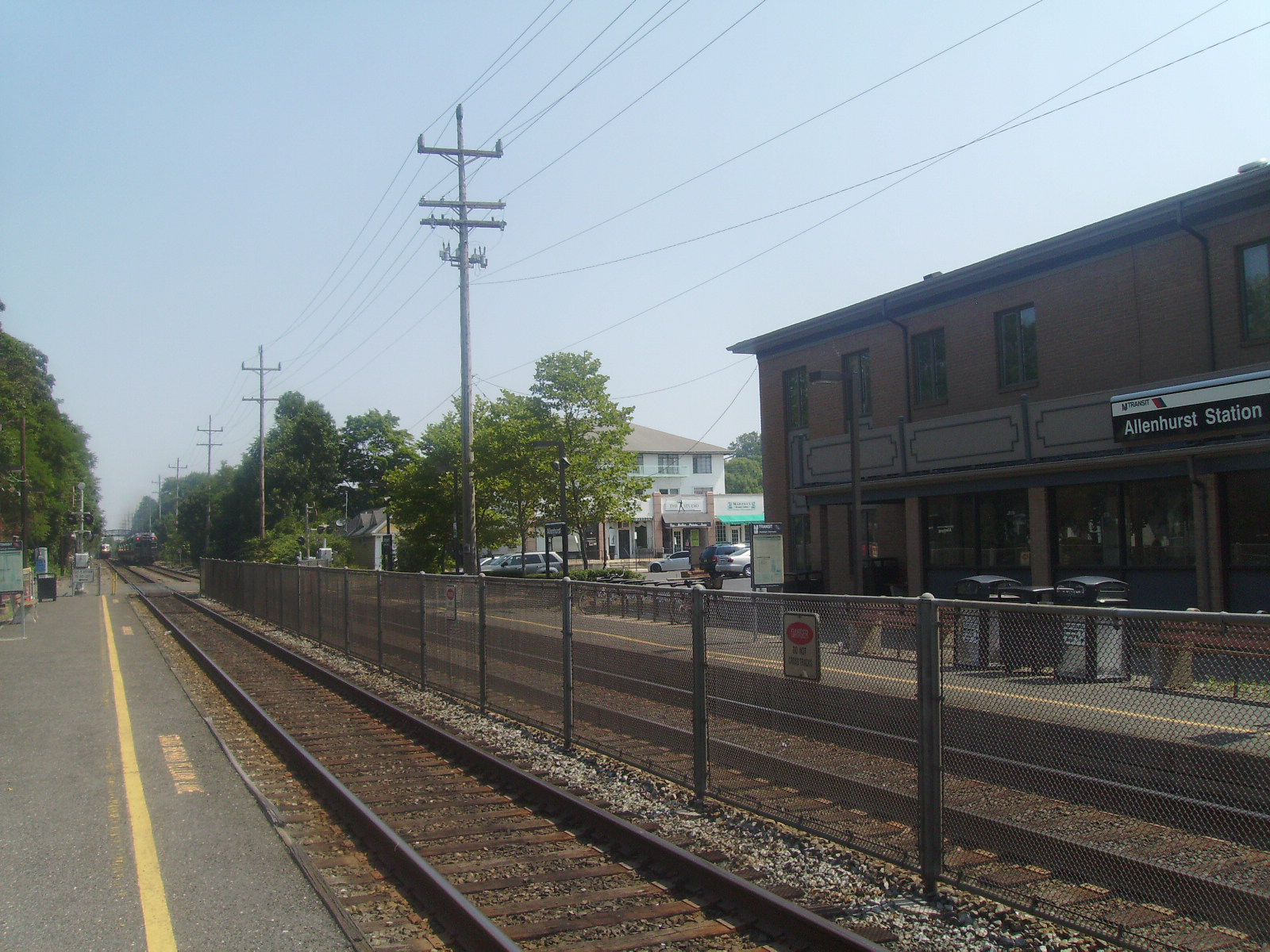
Allenhurst station, which is served by NJ Transit's North Jersey Coast Line

=== Public transportation ===
NJ Transit train service is offered from the Allenhurst station on the North Jersey Coast Line, providing service to Newark Penn Station, Secaucus Junction and New York Penn Station, as well as Hoboken Terminal. The station has been listed on the National Register of Historic Places since 1980.

New Jersey Transit offers local bus transportation on the 837 route.

== Climate ==
According to the Köppen climate classification system, Allenhurst has a Humid subtropical climate (Cfa).

Climate data for Allenhurst (40.2362, -74.0006), Elevation 13 ft (4 m), 1991–2020 normals, extremes 1981–2022
Month	Jan	Feb	Mar	Apr	May	Jun	Jul	Aug	Sep	Oct	Nov	Dec	Year
Record high °F (°C)	71.7 (22.1)	79.0 (26.1)	82.6 (28.1)	88.7 (31.5)	95.3 (35.2)	97.3 (36.3)	100.2 (37.9)	100.5 (38.1)	97.5 (36.4)	94.1 (34.5)	81.2 (27.3)	75.1 (23.9)	100.5 (38.1)
Mean daily maximum °F (°C)	40.7 (4.8)	42.5 (5.8)	48.6 (9.2)	58.8 (14.9)	68.3 (20.2)	77.7 (25.4)	83.2 (28.4)	81.7 (27.6)	75.9 (24.4)	65.4 (18.6)	54.8 (12.7)	46.2 (7.9)	62.1 (16.7)
Mean daily minimum °F (°C)	25.9 (−3.4)	27.2 (−2.7)	33.5 (0.8)	42.9 (6.1)	52.5 (11.4)	62.0 (16.7)	68.1 (20.1)	66.8 (19.3)	60.6 (15.9)	48.8 (9.3)	39.1 (3.9)	31.4 (−0.3)	46.7 (8.2)
Record low °F (°C)	−6.7 (−21.5)	0.6 (−17.4)	5.2 (−14.9)	18.2 (−7.7)	34.1 (1.2)	44.1 (6.7)	48.0 (8.9)	44.9 (7.2)	38.7 (3.7)	25.9 (−3.4)	14.7 (−9.6)	−0.3 (−17.9)	−6.7 (−21.5)
Average precipitation inches (mm)	3.79 (96)	3.17 (81)	4.27 (108)	3.92 (100)	3.84 (98)	4.08 (104)	4.20 (107)	5.05 (128)	3.92 (100)	4.24 (108)	3.40 (86)	4.66 (118)	48.53 (1,233)
Average snowfall inches (cm)	8.2 (21)	7.0 (18)	3.8 (9.7)	0.1 (0.25)	0.0 (0.0)	0.0 (0.0)	0.0 (0.0)	0.0 (0.0)	0.0 (0.0)	0.0 (0.0)	0.3 (0.76)	3.4 (8.6)	22.8 (58)
Average dew point °F (°C)	22.3 (−5.4)	23.0 (−5.0)	28.0 (−2.2)	37.2 (2.9)	48.7 (9.3)	59.4 (15.2)	64.4 (18.0)	64.1 (17.8)	58.5 (14.7)	47.1 (8.4)	36.1 (2.3)	28.3 (−2.1)	43.2 (6.2)
Source 1: PRISM
Source 2: NOHRSC (Snow, 2008/2009 - 2022/2023 normals)

Climate data for Atlantic City, NJ Ocean Water Temperature, 1911–present normals
Month	Jan	Feb	Mar	Apr	May	Jun	Jul	Aug	Sep	Oct	Nov	Dec	Year
Daily mean °F (°C)	39.7 (4.3)	38.5 (3.6)	41.9 (5.5)	48.7 (9.3)	56.4 (13.6)	64.7 (18.2)	68.9 (20.5)	73.1 (22.8)	72.2 (22.3)	64.1 (17.8)	53.6 (12.0)	45.2 (7.3)	55.7 (13.2)
Source: NCEI

== Ecology ==
According to the A. W. Kuchler U.S. potential natural vegetation types, Allenhurst would have a dominant vegetation type of Appalachian Oak (104) with a dominant vegetation form of Eastern Hardwood Forest (25).

== Notable people ==
People who were born in, residents of, or otherwise closely associated with Allenhurst include:

- Bob Considine (1906–1975), author and columnist for William Randolph Hearst's Newspapers, had a garage in Allenhurst
- Dorothy Fields (1905–1974), librettist and lyricist, born in Allenhurst
- Abram Fitkin (1878–1933), investment banker, utilities operator and philanthropist who owned Milestones at 16-18 Corlies Avenue
- Alice Joyce (1890–1955), film actress known as The Madonna of the Screen had a summer home in Allenhurst
- Hoddy Mahon (1932–2011), head coach of the Seton Hall Pirates men's basketball team during the 1981–1982 season
- Al Meyers (1908–1976), pioneer aviator who founded Meyers Aircraft Company
- Gloria Monty (1921–2006), television producer best known for her work in the field of soap operas, most notably her tenure at General Hospital
- James B. Murray (1920–2015), businessman and politician who served in the Virginia House of Delegates

Preceded by Deal	Beaches of New Jersey	Succeeded by Loch Arbour
