= Deal Lake =

Man-made lake in New Jersey, US

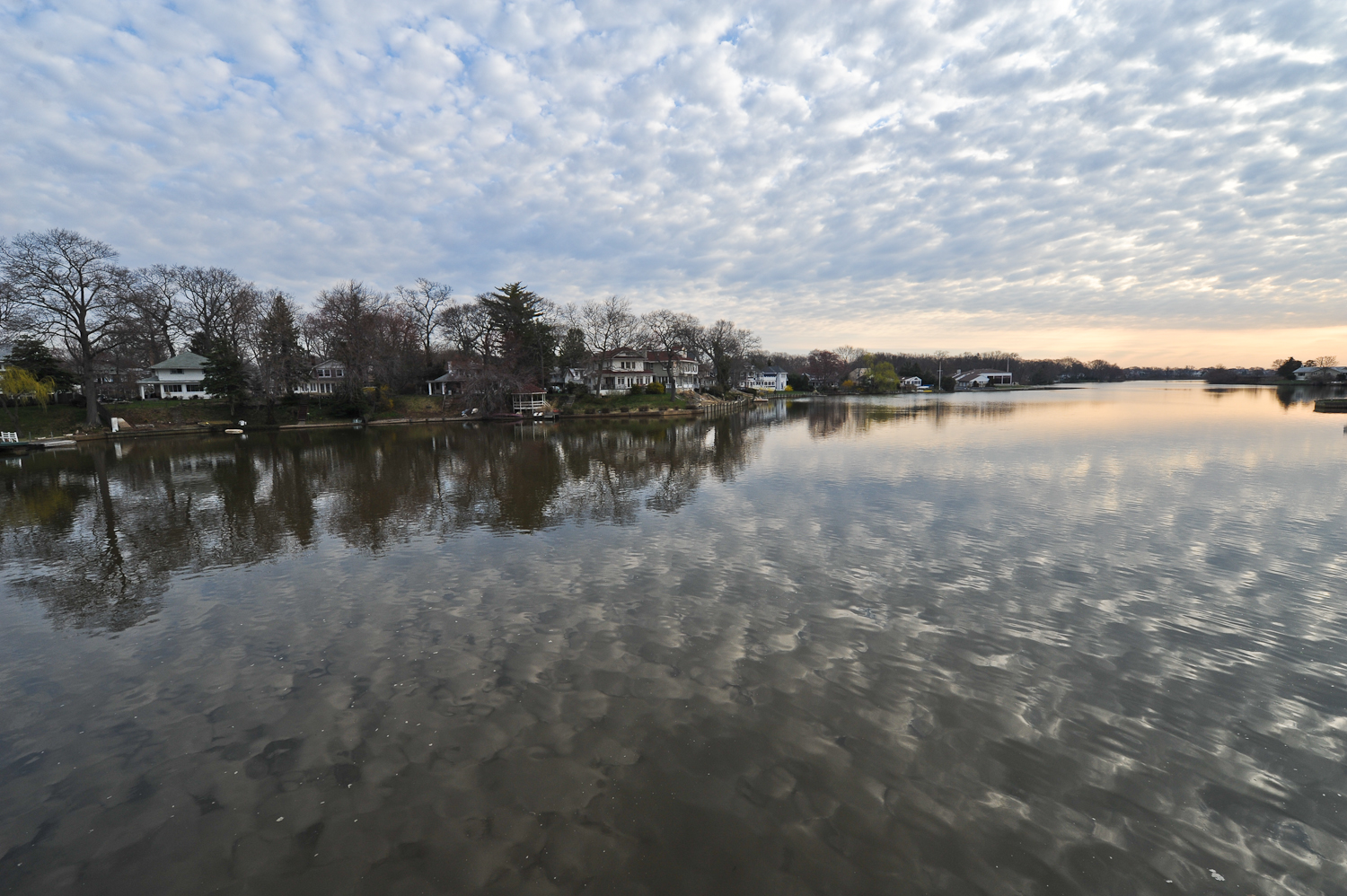
- View of lake from Asbury Park

- Location within New Jersey Location within the United States
- Location: Monmouth County, New Jersey
- Coordinates: 40.23156°N 74.00729°W
- Primary inflows: Harvey Brook, Hallow Brook, Storm Water run-off
- Primary outflows: Atlantic Ocean
- Basin countries: United States
- Surface area: 158 acres (0.64 km^{2})
- Average depth: 5 to 6 feet (1.8 m)
- Surface elevation: 3.2 ft (0.98 m) (Lower Main Section); 8 to 9 ft (Upper Sections)

Deal Lake is a man-made lake in Monmouth County, New Jersey. It is the largest lake in the county and one of the largest lakes in New Jersey, occupying 158 acres and drains into the Atlantic Ocean.

The lake covers 158 acres (64 ha). Seven municipalities border the lake, accounting for 27 miles (43 km) of shoreline, including Allenhurst, Asbury Park, Deal, Interlaken, Loch Arbour, Neptune Township and Ocean Township.

Deal Lake, like many urban and suburban bodies of water experienced serious environment pollutant problems in the mid 20th century, in 1974 the Deal Lake Commission was formed to help save the lake.

Deal is a freshwater lake, but is unique because it has spawning saltwater fish, including alewives, blueback herring and gizzard shad.

== History ==
Deal Lake has gone by many names over the years including Wickapecko, Lake Uliquecks, White's Pond, Hogs Swamp Pond, Corlies Pond, Great Pond and Boyleston Great Pond.

Originally an estuary of the Atlantic Ocean, Deal Lake was altered starting in 1890 to its present form, with the closing off the inlet from the ocean and creation of several separate lakes and ponds. Deal Lake was a model system of the late 19th century for flood control and storm water management. Over time, the lake lured many to build along its banks. Today, almost the entire shoreline has been developed with many homes built within the 100-year flood plain.

In the late 1890s, the Ross Fenton Farm was established as a popular entertainment spot on the Wanamassa banks of Deal Lake.
