= 2000 United States presidential election in New Jersey =

- November 7, 2000
- Turnout: 70.08% (▼1.96%)

Nominee	Al Gore	George W. Bush
Party	Democratic	Republican
Home state	Tennessee	Texas
Running mate	Joe Lieberman	Dick Cheney
Electoral vote	15	0
Popular vote	1,788,850	1,284,173
Percentage	56.13%	40.29%

Gore
40–50%
50–60%
60–70%
70–80%
80–90%
90–100%
Bush
40–50%
50–60%
60–70%
70–80%
80–90%
90–100%
Tie
President before election
Bill Clinton
Democratic
Elected President
George W. Bush
Republican

In 2000, the United States presidential election in New Jersey, along with every U.S. state and Washington, D.C., took place on November 7, 2000, as part of the 2000 United States presidential election. The major party candidates were Democratic Vice President Al Gore of the incumbent administration and Republican Governor of Texas George W. Bush, son of the 41st U.S. president, George H. W. Bush. Owing to the indirect system of voting used in U.S. presidential elections, George W. Bush narrowly defeated Gore in Electoral College votes despite Gore earning a higher percentage of the popular vote. Green Party candidate Ralph Nader, the only third-party candidate represented on most states' ballots, came in a distant third.

Although New Jersey had voted for Democrat Bill Clinton in the past two elections (1992 and 1996), it was considered a potential swing state in 2000 because pre-election polling data showed it to be a close race. Al Gore won 56 percent of New Jersey's popular vote, beating out George W. Bush by about a sixteen-point margin, with Gore's biggest margins of victory in Essex County and Hudson County where he won over seventy percent of the vote. Bush won 7 counties with his biggest margins being just over 57 percent in Hunterdon County and Sussex County. Nader got over four percent of the vote in several counties in the northwest of the state, while taking just under three percent statewide. This was also the first presidential election since 1976, in which New Jersey would back the losing candidate as well. As of the 2024 presidential election, this is the last election in which Monmouth County voted for a Democratic presidential candidate. Monmouth however would go on to vote for Bush 4 years later in 2004 during his re-election.

Bush became the first Republican to win the White House without carrying Bergen County, Burlington County, or Monmouth County, as well as the state of New Jersey since Benjamin Harrison in 1888. Bush became the first Republican to win without Union County since James A. Garfield in 1880. Bush was the first Republican to ever win the Presidency without Passaic and Gloucester counties, and the only Republican to ever win without Salem County.

New Jersey was one of ten states that backed George H. W. Bush for president in 1988 that didn't back George W. Bush in either 2000 or 2004.

== General election ==
=== Polling ===
Poll source	Date(s)	Sample size	Margin of error	George W. Bush (R)	Al Gore (D)	Ralph Nader (G)	Other / undecided (Note: Calculated by taking the difference of 100% and all other listed candidates combined. For polls that do not report a figure for Nader, this includes his support.)
Rasmussen Reports	November 5, 2000	637	—	40%	46%	—	14%
Harris Insights & Analytics	November 3, 2000	7,217	—	40%	54%	5%	1%
Monmouth University Poilling Institute	November 3, 2000	843	—	34%	47%	6%	13%
Quinnipiac University Polling Institute	November 1–5, 2000	770 LV	±3.4%	41%	49%	4%	6%
Rasmussen Reports	October 30, 2000	594	—	39%	45%	—	16%
Monmouth University Poilling Institute	October 27, 2000	575	—	36%	41%	—	23%
Quinnipiac University Polling Institute	October 24–30, 2000	793 LV	±3.5%	38%	50%	5%	7%
Rutgers University Eagleton Center for Public Interest Polling	October 25, 2000	432	—	35%	47%	5%	13%
SurveyUSA	October 25, 2000	500	—	45%	49%	—	6%
Quinnipiac University Polling Institute	October 18–23, 2000	909 LV	±3.3%	41%	47%	4%	9%
The New York Times	October 12–15, 2000	908 RV	±3%	34%	49%	8%	9%
Quinnipiac University Polling Institute	September 26–October 1, 2000	820 LV	±3.4%	38%	54%	–	8%
Quinnipiac University Polling Institute	September 26–October 1, 2000	820 LV	±3.4%	36%	50%	6%	7%
Quinnipiac University Polling Institute	September 26–October 1, 2000	1,045 RV	±3.0%	36%	53%	–	11%
Quinnipiac University Polling Institute	September 26–October 1, 2000	1,045 RV	±3.0%	35%	49%	6%	10%
Quinnipiac University Polling Institute	August 18–22, 2000	802 RV	±3.5%	38%	52%	–	10%
Quinnipiac University Polling Institute	August 18–22, 2000	802 RV	±3.5%	37%	49%	4%	10%
Quinnipiac University Polling Institute	July 19–24, 2000	910 RV	±3.3%	41%	46%	–	14%
Quinnipiac University Polling Institute	July 19–24, 2000	910 RV	±3.3%	38%	42%	7%	13%
Quinnipiac University Polling Institute	June 20–26, 2000	1,004 RV	±3.1%	40%	45%	–	15%
Quinnipiac University Polling Institute	June 20–26, 2000	1,004 RV	±3.1%	37%	41%	7%	15%
Quinnipiac University Polling Institute	March 21–27, 2000	1,177 RV	±2.9%	37%	50%	–	14%
Quinnipiac University Polling Institute	March 21–27, 2000	1,177 RV	±2.9%	35%	48%	–	18% (Note: Includes 6% for Pat Buchanan.)
Quinnipiac University Polling Institute	February 16–21, 2000	1,109 RV	±2.9%	41%	47%	–	12%
Quinnipiac University Polling Institute	July 13–20, 1999	1,082 RV	±3.0%	51%	40%		10%
Quinnipiac University Polling Institute	March 23–29, 1999	984 RV	±3.1%	47%	40%	–	13%
Quinnipiac University Polling Institute	February 3–8, 1999	926 RV	±3.2%	46%	41%	–	11%

Hypothetical polling

with Al Gore

Poll source	Date(s) administered	Sample size	Margin of error	Al Gore (D)	Elizabeth Dole (R)	John McCain (R)	Other	Undecided
Quinnipiac University Polling Institute	February 3–8, 1999	926 RV	±3.2%	42%	43%	–	2%	13%
Quinnipiac University Polling Institute	March 23–29, 1999	984 RV	±3.1%	41%	42%	–	17%	
Quinnipiac University Polling Institute	July 13–20, 1999	1,082 RV	±3.0%	46%	41%	–	2%	11%
Quinnipiac University Polling Institute	February 16–21, 2000	1,109 RV	±2.9%	38%	–	51%	2%	11%

with Bill Bradley

Poll source	Date(s) administered	Sample size	Margin of error	Bill Bradley (D)	George W. Bush (R)	Elizabeth Dole (R)	John McCain (R)	Other	Undecided
Quinnipiac University Polling Institute	February 3–8, 1999	926 RV	±3.2%	55%	32%	–	–	2%	11%
Quinnipiac University Polling Institute	February 3–8, 1999	926 RV	±3.2%	56%	–	32%	–	2%	10%
Quinnipiac University Polling Institute	March 23–29, 1999	984 RV	±3.1%	53%	35%	–	–	12%	
Quinnipiac University Polling Institute	March 23–29, 1999	984 RV	±3.1%	59%	–	28%	–	13%	
Quinnipiac University Polling Institute	July 13–20, 1999	1,082 RV	±3.0%	53%	38%	–	–	1%	8%
Quinnipiac University Polling Institute	July 13–20, 1999	1,082 RV	±3.0%	62%	–	28%	–	2%	8%
Quinnipiac University Polling Institute	February 16–21, 2000	1,109 RV	±2.9%	60%	32%	–	–	1%	8%
Quinnipiac University Polling Institute	February 16–21, 2000	1,109 RV	±2.9%	49%	–	–	38%	1%	12%

=== Results ===
2000 United States presidential election in New Jersey
Party	Candidate	Votes	Percentage	Electoral votes
Democratic	Al Gore	1,788,850	56.13%	15
Republican	George W. Bush	1,284,173	40.29%	0
Green	Ralph Nader	94,554	2.97%	0
Reform	Pat Buchanan	6,989	0.22%	0
Libertarian	Harry Browne	6,312	0.20%	0
Natural Law	John Hagelin	2,215	0.07%	0
Socialist	David McReynolds	1,880	0.06%	0
Constitution	Howard Phillips	1,409	0.04%	0
Socialist Workers	James Harris	844	0.03%	0
Totals		3,187,226	100.00%	15
Voter Turnout (Voting age/Registered)				50%/68%

==== By county ====
County	Al Gore Democratic		George W. Bush Republican		Various candidates Other parties		Margin		Total votes cast
County	#	%	#	%	#	%	#	%	Total votes cast
Atlantic	52,880	58.04%	35,593	39.07%	2,629	2.89%	17,287	18.97%	91,102
Bergen	202,682	55.27%	152,731	41.65%	11,308	3.08%	49,951	13.62%	366,721
Burlington	99,506	56.05%	72,254	40.70%	5,781	3.26%	27,252	15.35%	177,541
Camden	127,166	64.60%	62,464	31.73%	7,231	3.67%	64,702	32.87%	196,861
Cape May	22,189	46.62%	23,794	49.99%	1,611	3.38%	-1,605	-3.37%	47,594
Cumberland	28,188	57.90%	18,882	38.78%	1,614	3.32%	9,306	19.12%	48,684
Essex	185,505	71.47%	66,842	25.75%	7,226	2.78%	118,663	45.72%	259,573
Gloucester	61,095	56.94%	42,315	39.44%	3,888	3.63%	18,780	17.50%	107,298
Hudson	118,206	70.63%	43,804	26.17%	5,351	3.20%	74,402	44.46%	167,361
Hunterdon	21,387	37.88%	32,210	57.05%	2,858	5.06%	-10,823	-19.17%	56,455
Mercer	83,256	61.42%	46,670	34.43%	5,633	4.16%	36,586	26.99%	135,559
Middlesex	154,998	59.88%	93,545	36.14%	10,306	3.98%	61,453	23.74%	258,849
Monmouth	131,476	50.15%	119,291	45.51%	11,374	4.34%	12,185	4.64%	262,141
Morris	88,039	42.63%	111,066	53.78%	7,403	3.58%	-23,027	-11.15%	206,508
Ocean	102,104	47.18%	105,684	48.84%	8,605	3.98%	-3,580	-1.66%	216,393
Passaic	90,324	57.69%	61,043	38.99%	5,206	3.32%	29,281	18.70%	156,573
Salem	13,718	50.86%	12,257	45.44%	997	3.70%	1,461	5.42%	26,972
Somerset	56,232	46.71%	59,725	49.61%	4,420	3.67%	-3,493	-2.90%	120,377
Sussex	21,353	37.14%	33,277	57.88%	2,860	4.97%	-11,924	-20.74%	57,490
Union	112,003	60.10%	68,554	36.78%	5,816	3.12%	43,449	23.32%	186,373
Warren	16,543	40.55%	22,172	54.34%	2,086	5.11%	-5,629	-13.79%	40,801
Totals	1,788,850	56.13%	1,284,173	40.29%	114,203	3.58%	504,677	15.83%	3,187,226

===== Counties that flipped from Democratic to Republican =====
- Cape May (largest municipality: Lower Township)
- Ocean (largest municipality: Lakewood Township)

==== By congressional district ====
Gore won 11 of 13 congressional districts, including four that elected Republicans.

District	Gore	Bush	Representative
1st	63.90%	32.89%	Rob Andrews
2nd	54.78%	42.55%	Frank LoBiondo
3rd	53.45%	43.41%	Jim Saxton
4th	52.28%	44.55%	Chris Smith
5th	44.64%	51.69%	Marge Roukema
6th	57.72%	38.37%	Frank Pallone Jr.
7th	54.19%	42.79%	Bob Franks
7th	54.19%	42.79%	Mike Ferguson
8th	61.05%	36.25%	Bill Pascrell
9th	63.32%	33.64%	Steve Rothman
10th	84.70%	13.72%	Donald Payne
11th	43.36%	53.50%	Rodney Frelinghuysen
12th	50.90%	45.57%	Rush Holt Jr.
13th	72.35%	25.33%	Bob Menendez

== Electors ==
Technically the voters of NJ cast their ballots for electors: representatives to the Electoral College. NJ is allocated 15 electors because it has 13 congressional districts and 2 senators. All candidates who appear on the ballot or qualify to receive write-in votes must submit a list of 15 electors, who pledge to vote for their candidate and his or her running mate. Whoever wins the majority of votes in the state is awarded all 15 electoral votes. Their chosen electors then vote for president and vice president. Although electors are pledged to their candidate and running mate, they are not obligated to vote for them. An elector who votes for someone other than his or her candidate is known as a faithless elector.

The electors of each state and the District of Columbia met on December 18, 2000 to cast their votes for president and vice president. The Electoral College itself never meets as one body. Instead the electors from each state and the District of Columbia met in their respective capitols.

The following were the members of the Electoral College from the state. All were pledged to and voted for Gore and Lieberman:

- Paul M. Bangiola
- Angelo R. Bianchi
- Mamie Bridgeforth
- Dennis P. Collins
- John Garrett
- Deborah Lynch
- Patricia McCullough
- John McGreevey
- June B. Montag
- Jeffrey L. Nash
- Barbara A. Plumeri
- Julia Valdivia
- Stephen S. Weinstein
- Charles Wowkanech

== See also ==
- United States presidential elections in New Jersey
- Presidency of George W. Bush
