= Tinton Falls, New Jersey =

Borough in Monmouth County, New Jersey, US

- Borough
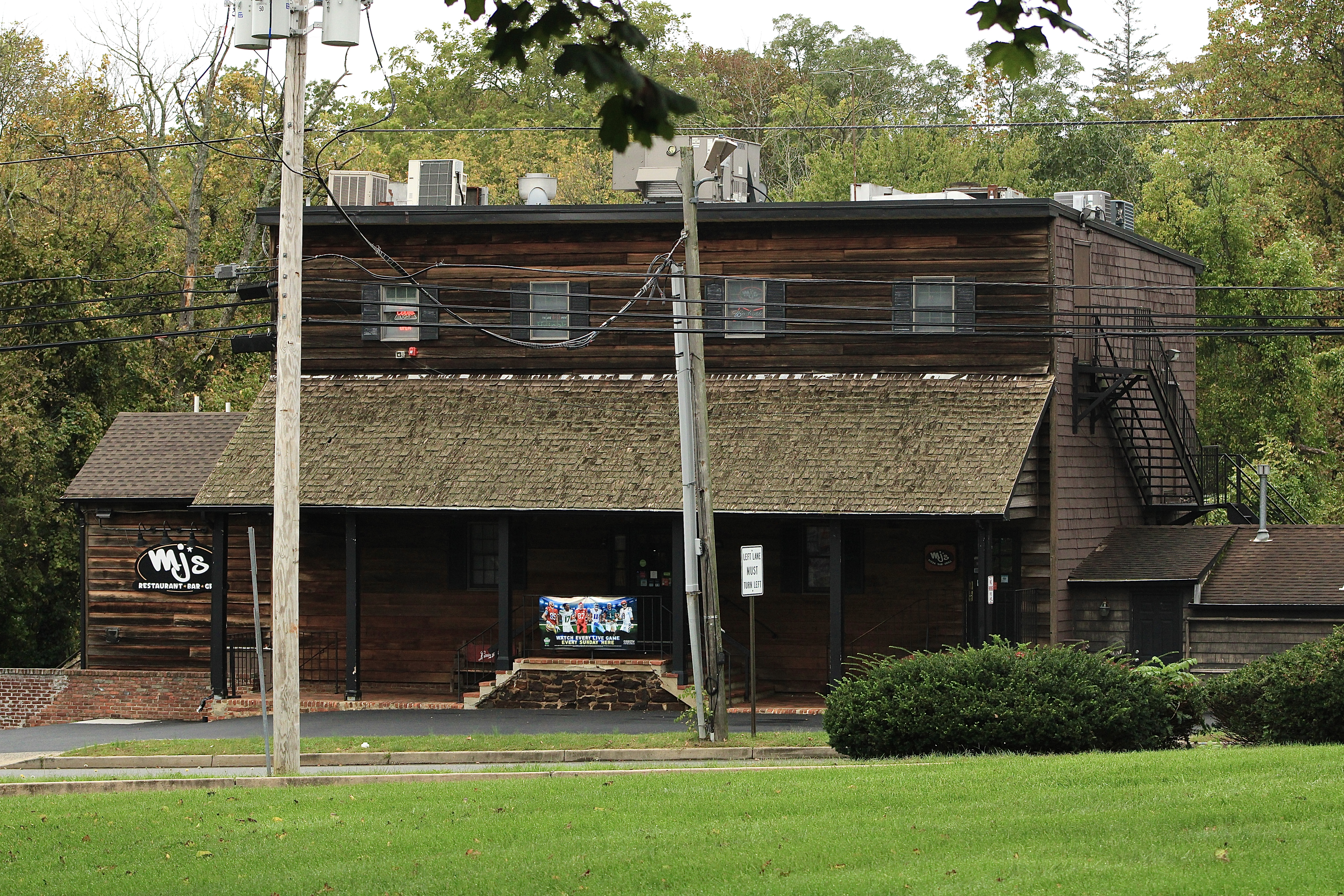
- Old Mill at Tinton Falls

- Seal

- Map of Tinton Falls in Monmouth County. Inset: Location of Monmouth County highlighted in the State of New Jersey.

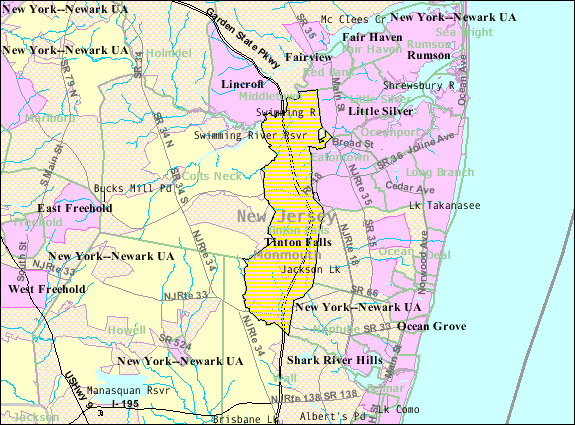
- Census Bureau map of Tinton Falls, New Jersey

- Location in Monmouth County Location in New Jersey Location in the United States
- Coordinates: 40.266265°N 74.09613°W
- Country: United States
- State: New Jersey
- County: Monmouth
- Incorporated: August 15, 1950 as New Shrewsbury
- Renamed: 1975 as Tinton Falls

Government
  - Type: Faulkner Act (mayor–council)
  - Body: Borough Council
  - Mayor: Risa Clay
  - Administrator: Charles W. Terefenko
  - Municipal clerk: Michelle Hutchinson

Area
  - Total: 15.61 sq mi (40.42 km^{2})
  - Land: 15.47 sq mi (40.08 km^{2})
  - Water: 0.13 sq mi (0.33 km^{2}) 0.83%
  - Rank: 173rd of 565 in state 12th of 53 in county
- Elevation: 98 ft (30 m)

Population (2020)
  - Total: 19,181
  - Estimate (2023): 19,354
  - Rank: 144th of 565 in state 12th of 53 in county
  - Density: 1,239.5/sq mi (478.6/km^{2})
  - Rank: 357th of 565 in state 44th of 53 in county
- Time zone: UTC−05:00 (Eastern (EST))
  - Summer (DST): UTC−04:00 (Eastern (EDT))
- ZIP Codes: 07701 – Red Bank; 07712 – Ocean Township; 07724 – Eatontown; 07753 – Neptune
- Area code: 732
- FIPS code: 3402573020
- GNIS feature ID: 0885419
- Website: www.tintonfalls.com

Tinton Falls is a borough in Monmouth County, in the U.S. state of New Jersey. Located within the heart of the Jersey Shore region, the borough is a commercial hub of Central Jersey (it is the site of the Jersey Shore Premium Outlets and different corporate headquarters) and is an established bedroom suburb of New York City, in the New York metropolitan area. As of the 2020 United States census, the borough's population was 19,181, an increase of 1,289 (+7.2%) from the 2010 census count of 17,892, which in turn reflected an increase of 2,839 (+18.9%) from the 15,053 counted in the 2000 census.

The borough was formed as New Shrewsbury by an act of the New Jersey Legislature on August 15, 1950, based on the results of a referendum held on July 18, 1950, after breaking away from Shrewsbury Township. It was renamed "Tinton Falls" in 1975, to avoid postal errors. The name came from Lewis Morris's plantation, Tinton Manor (which employed free white workers and slaves) as it featured a gristmill, making it one of New Jersey's earliest bustling mill towns. The borough is home to the highest waterfall on New Jersey's coastal plain, from which the aforementioned mill generated power.

== History ==
The area that is now known as Tinton Falls was originally settled by Europeans in the late 1600s, probably beginning with the initial land purchases from the Lenni Lenape Native Americans in 1664. Water power and iron ore were likely the incentives that encouraged settlement: shortly after [the land was purchased], a man by the name of James Grover had an ironworks built along the river. Grover was likely the founder of the community, which, in the 1600s, was named "New Shrewsbury". At this time, the waterfall was known to be about 30 feet (9.1 m) high; erosion and the destruction of the dam near the ironworks have led to its diminishment.

=== The ironworks ===
Grover's ironworks was the central fixture of the community, and it was one of the oldest built in the country, predated only by buildings in Jamestown and Massachusetts. In 1675, a half-interest in the ironworks company was purchased by Colonel Lewis Morris, [who obtained a title granting him 3,540 acres (14.3 km^{2}) along the Shrewsbury River]. Morris also obtained land owned by Bartholomew Applegate, who had built a corn mill on the other side of the river. Morris, who procured the land for iron mining, named his holdings "Tintern Manor," after his family lands in Monmouthshire, Great Britain. Tintern Abbey, located in Monmouthshire, Wales, is often accepted as the namesake of Tinton Falls.

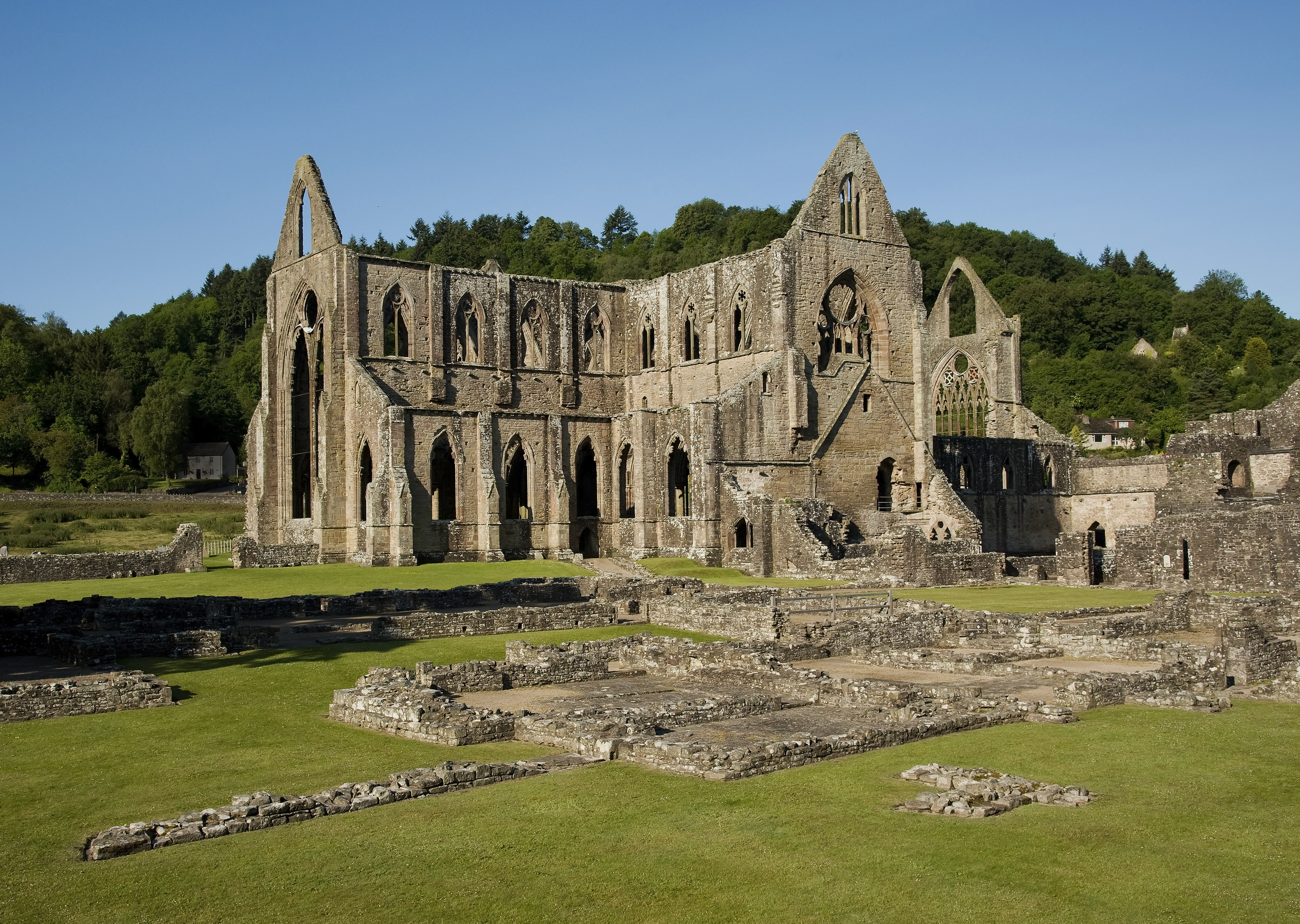
Tintern Abbey in Monmouthshire, Wales, is often accepted as the namesake of Tinton Falls.

In 1691, Colonel Morris died, leaving the ironworks and Tinton Manor (a corruption of "Tintern Manor") to his nephew of the same name. By 1714, the ironworks had become less profitable, but mention of a Tinton Falls ironworks can be found as late as 1844. Morris brought in dozens of African slaves to mine the ore resulting in the nickname the "Iron Plantation", with the highest number of slaves being in Tinton Falls at that time in the colony of New Jersey, though in the mid-18th century it had the largest number of emancipated slaves in the 13 colonies, as residents followed the preaching of abolitionist John Woolman.

=== Separation from Shrewsbury Township ===
In 1693, Tinton Manor and the surrounding lands were defined as part of Shrewsbury Township. At this time, Shrewsbury included all of the land in eastern Monmouth County, but lost land due to the creation of a large number of new municipalities over the years, including the borough of Shrewsbury in 1926. In July 1950, Tinton Falls and Wayside left Shrewsbury Township, renaming themselves the Borough of New Shrewsbury. To avoid postal confusion and mix-ups with the surrounding borough and township of Shrewsbury, the residents of New Shrewsbury voted to rename the community as "The Borough of Tinton Falls" in 1975.

== Geography ==
According to the United States Census Bureau, the borough had a total area of 15.60 square miles (40.41 km^{2}), including 15.48 square miles (40.08 km^{2}) of land and 0.13 square miles (0.33 km^{2}) of water (0.83%).

Unincorporated communities, localities and place names located partially or completely within the borough include Wayside. Green Grove, Hockhockson, Macedonia, Pine Brook, Reevytown, West Shrewsbury and Wileys Corner are other unincorporated communities located partly or completely within the borough.

The borough borders the Monmouth County municipalities of Colts Neck Township, Eatontown, Middletown Township, Neptune Township, Ocean Township, Red Bank, Shrewsbury, Shrewsbury Township and Wall Township.

== Demographics ==
Historical population
Census	Pop.	Note	%±
1950	3,783		—
1960	7,313		93.3%
1970	8,395		14.8%
1980	7,740		−7.8%
1990	12,361		59.7%
2000	15,053		21.8%
2010	17,892		18.9%
2020	19,181		7.2%
2023 (est.)	19,354	▲	0.9%
Population sources: 1950–2000 2000; 2010 2020

=== 2020 census ===
As of the 2020 census, Tinton Falls had a population of 19,181. The median age was 48.4 years. 16.5% of residents were under the age of 18 and 25.6% of residents were 65 years of age or older. For every 100 females there were 80.7 males, and for every 100 females age 18 and over there were 76.9 males age 18 and over.

98.8% of residents lived in urban areas, while 1.2% lived in rural areas.

There were 8,500 households in Tinton Falls, of which 21.8% had children under the age of 18 living in them. Of all households, 45.0% were married-couple households, 13.7% were households with a male householder and no spouse or partner present, and 36.0% were households with a female householder and no spouse or partner present. About 37.4% of all households were made up of individuals and 22.3% had someone living alone who was 65 years of age or older.

There were 8,972 housing units, of which 5.3% were vacant. The homeowner vacancy rate was 1.3% and the rental vacancy rate was 9.6%.

Racial composition as of the 2020 census
Race	Number	Percent
White	14,445	75.3%
Black or African American	1,667	8.7%
American Indian and Alaska Native	59	0.3%
Asian	1,047	5.5%
Native Hawaiian and Other Pacific Islander	0	0.0%
Some other race	580	3.0%
Two or more races	1,383	7.2%
Hispanic or Latino (of any race)	1,694	8.8%

=== 2010 census ===
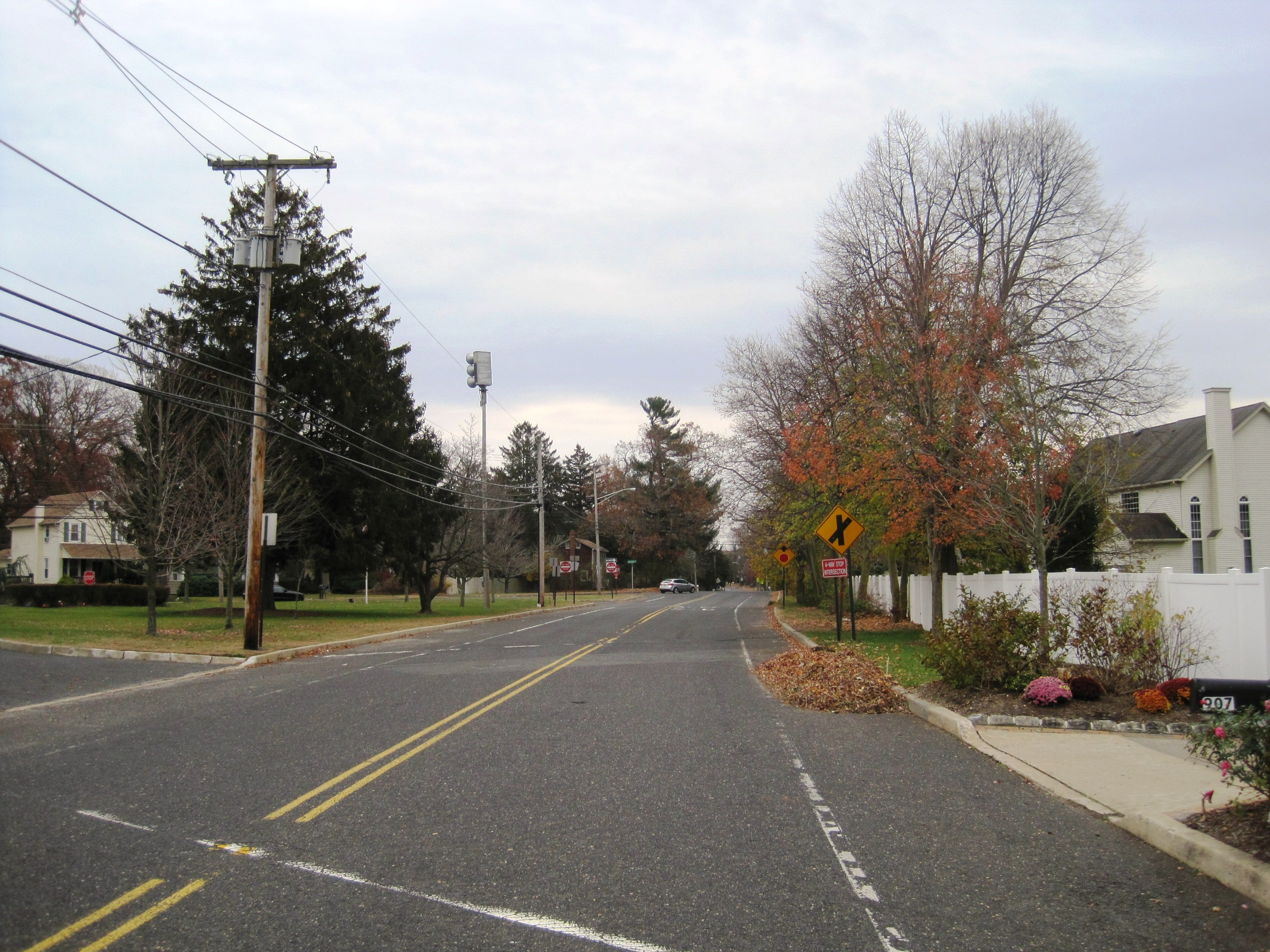
The Wayside residential neighborhood. Located on the border of Tinton Falls and Ocean Township.

The 2010 United States census counted 17,892 people, 8,355 households, and 4,462 families in the borough. The population density was 1,155.3 per square mile (446.1/km^{2}). There were 8,766 housing units at an average density of 566.0 per square mile (218.5/km^{2}). The racial makeup was 82.39% (14,741) White, 9.34% (1,672) Black or African American, 0.13% (23) Native American, 4.67% (835) Asian, 0.02% (4) Pacific Islander, 1.31% (235) from other races, and 2.14% (382) from two or more races. Hispanic or Latino of any race were 6.25% (1,118) of the population.

Of the 8,355 households, 21.9% had children under the age of 18; 43.7% were married couples living together; 7.5% had a female householder with no husband present and 46.6% were non-families. Of all households, 42.3% were made up of individuals and 27.4% had someone living alone who was 65 years of age or older. The average household size was 2.11 and the average family size was 2.95.

19.0% of the population were under the age of 18, 4.9% from 18 to 24, 23.2% from 25 to 44, 27.4% from 45 to 64, and 25.6% who were 65 years of age or older. The median age was 46.9 years. For every 100 females, the population had 78.9 males. For every 100 females ages 18 and older there were 74.2 males.

The Census Bureau's 2006–2010 American Community Survey showed that (in 2010 inflation-adjusted dollars) median household income was $78,894 (with a margin of error of +/− $4,470) and the median family income was $99,231 (+/− $8,633). Males had a median income of $72,478 (+/− $8,954) versus $53,956 (+/− $7,492) for females. The per capita income for the borough was $40,149 (+/− $2,077). About 3.2% of families and 4.1% of the population were below the poverty line, including 6.2% of those under age 18 and 3.7% of those age 65 or over.

=== 2000 census ===
As of the 2000 United States census there were 15,053 people, 5,883 households, and 3,976 families residing in the borough. The population density was 965.7 inhabitants per square mile (372.9/km^{2}). There were 6,211 housing units at an average density of 398.4 per square mile (153.8/km^{2}). The racial makeup of the borough was 78.80% White, 13.04% African American, 0.24% Native American, 4.96% Asian, 0.01% Pacific Islander, 1.04% from other races, and 1.90% from two or more races. Hispanic or Latino of any race were 4.70% of the population.

There were 5,883 households, out of which 34.1% had children under the age of 18 living with them, 56.0% were married couples living together, 9.2% had a female householder with no husband present, and 32.4% were non-families. 27.2% of all households were made up of individuals, and 7.3% had someone living alone who was 65 years of age or older. The average household size was 2.51 and the average family size was 3.11.

In the borough the population was spread out, with 25.5% under the age of 18, 5.2% from 18 to 24, 36.4% from 25 to 44, 22.1% from 45 to 64, and 10.8% who were 65 years of age or older. The median age was 37 years. For every 100 females, there were 90.6 males. For every 100 females age 18 and over, there were 86.2 males.

The median income for a household in the borough was $68,697, and the median income for a family was $79,773. Males had a median income of $58,098 versus $37,857 for females. The per capita income for the borough was $31,520. About 2.6% of families and 3.9% of the population were below the poverty line, including 4.3% of those under age 18 and 3.3% of those age 65 or over.

== Economy ==
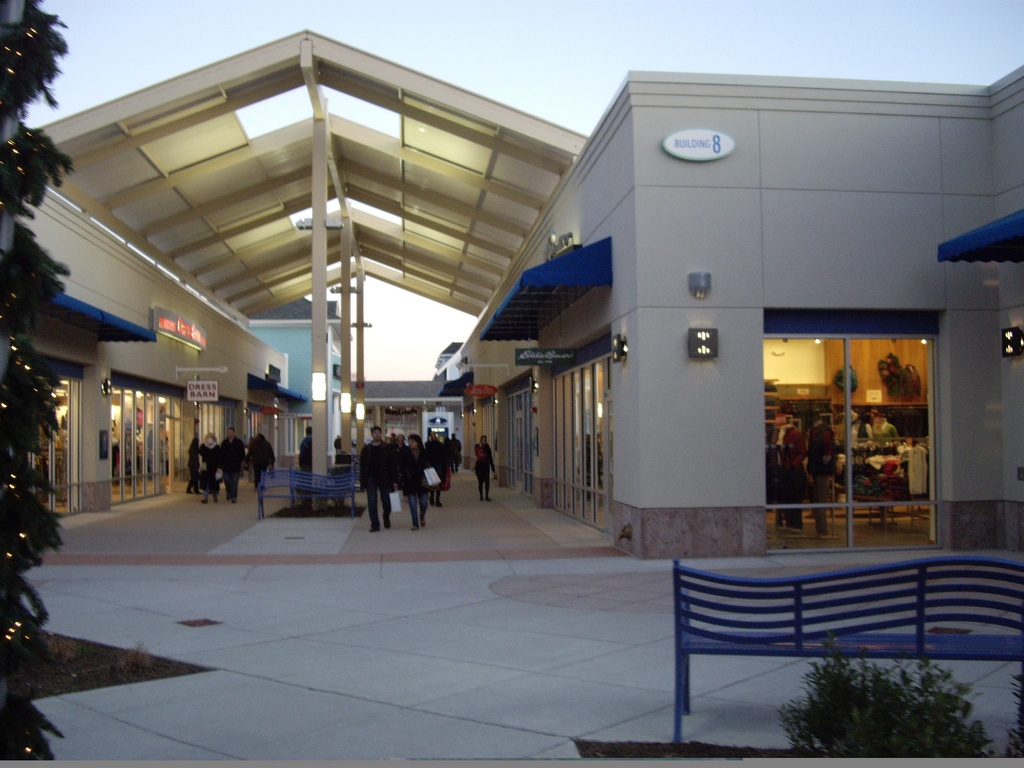
Jersey Shore Premium Outlets

Jersey Shore Premium Outlets is an outdoor shopping mall that opened in November 2008 with 120 outlet stores and a food court, offering a gross leasable area of 435,000 square feet (40,400 m^{2}).

The Tinton Falls Solar Farm is a 28.5-megawatt solar photovoltaic power plant covering 170 acres (69 ha), that contains 85,000 ground-mounted solar panels that has been the state's largest and was New Jersey's largest and one of the largest solar farms in the northeast United States at the time of its construction.

Commvault Systems, founded in 1996, is a publicly traded data management and information management software company. Commvault's global headquarters are in Tinton Falls.

== Parks and recreation ==
Overlook by the Falls, located near the town's waterfalls (the namesake for the town), is a wildlife area where trails have been added to allow visitors to view the falls and the local fauna.

Borough parks include Hockhockson Park, with three baseball fields and basketball courts; Liberty II Park, with two football fields, a softball field and basketball courts; Riverdale West Park, with two soccer fields and a basketball court; and the Sycamore Recreation Complex, which offers six lighted multi-purpose fields; among the borough's other parks and recreation facilities.

Shark River Park, the first included in the Monmouth County Park System when it was established in 1961, covers 961 acres (389 ha) along the Shark River in portions of Tinton Falls, Neptune Township and Wall Township.

The Twin Brook Golf Center was a public 9-hole golf course, 18-hole miniature golf course, and driving range before the land was purchased by Amazon for the construction of a delivery station warehouse in 2021.

== Government ==
=== Local government ===
The Borough of Tinton Falls operates under the Faulkner Act, formally known as the Optional Municipal Charter Law, using the Mayor-Council form of municipal government (Plan 6), implemented by direct petition as of July 1, 1985. The borough is one of 71 municipalities (of the 564) statewide governed under this form. The governing body is comprised of the mayor and the borough council. The mayor is the chief executive officer of the borough and is directly elected for a four-year term of office. The borough council, which is the legislative body, includes five members elected at-large on a non-partisan basis for four-year terms on a staggered basis, with either two or three seats up for election every other year as part of the November general election, with the mayoral seat up for vote at the same time that two council seats are being chosen by voters. A business administrator reports to, and may act on behalf of the mayor, in the mayor's absence. The Borough Council voted in May 2010 to shift its elections from May to the November general election, as part of an effort to increase participation of voters and to cut costs associated with the May elections, with savings estimated at nearly $100,000 during the first decade after the change was implemented in the November 2011 vote.

As of February 2025, the mayor of Tinton Falls is vacant following the death of Vito Perillo, whose term of office would have ended December 31, 2025. Members of the Borough Council are Council President Risa Clay (2027), Deputy Council President Lawrence A. Dobrin (2025), Greg Alessi (2025, appointed to serve an unexpired term), Tracy A. Buckley (2027) and Michael J. Nesci (2027).

In December 2024, the borough council appointed Greg Alessi to fill the seat expiring in December 2025 that became vacant following the death of John A. Manginelli the previous month.

Perillo, a World War II veteran and former engineer who won the race in 2017 by a 2,600–2,300 margin in his first run for elected office at 93 years old, ran on a platform of lowering taxes and improving transparency. In November 2021, Perillo, at 97 years old, was elected for a second four-year term, giving him the nickname "America's Oldest Mayor." He turned 100 on September 22, 2024, but rarely attended council meetings and was often represented by a proxy. In December 2024, Perillo announced that he would not run for a third term. Perillo died on February 22, 2025.

=== Federal, state and county representation ===
Tinton Falls is located in the 4th Congressional District and is part of New Jersey's 11th state legislative district.

For the 119th United States Congress, New Jersey's 4th congressional district is represented by Chris Smith (R, Manchester Township). New Jersey is represented in the United States Senate by Democrats Cory Booker (Newark, term ends 2027) and Andy Kim (Moorestown, term ends 2031).

For the 2026–2027 session, the 11th legislative district of the New Jersey Legislature is represented in the New Jersey Senate by Vin Gopal (D, Long Branch) and in the General Assembly by Margie Donlon (D, Ocean Township) and Luanne Peterpaul (D, Long Branch).

Monmouth County is governed by a Board of County Commissioners composed of five members who are elected at-large to serve three-year terms of office on a staggered basis, with either one or two seats up for election each year as part of the November general election. At an annual reorganization meeting held in the beginning of January, the board selects one of its members to serve as director and another as deputy director.

As of 2025, Monmouth County's Commissioners are Director Thomas A. Arnone (R, Neptune City, 2025), Susan M. Kiley (R, Hazlet Township, 2027), Erik Anderson (R, Shrewsbury, 2026), Nick DiRocco (R, Wall Township, 2025), and Deputy Director Ross F. Licitra (R, Marlboro Township, 2026).

Constitutional officers elected on a countywide basis are Clerk Christine Giordano Hanlon (R, 2025; Ocean Township), Sheriff Shaun Golden (R, 2025; Howell Township) and Surrogate Rosemarie D. Peters (R, 2026; Middletown Township).

=== Politics ===
United States presidential election results for Tinton Falls
Year	Republican		Democratic		Third party(ies)	
Year	No.	%	No.	%	No.	%
2024	5,791	48.95%	5,847	49.43%	192	1.62%
2020	5,610	45.72%	6,495	52.93%	165	1.34%
2016	4,859	47.36%	5,050	49.22%	351	3.42%
2012	4,329	46.93%	4,788	51.90%	108	1.17%
2008	4,483	46.45%	5,065	52.48%	104	1.08%
2004	4,476	50.96%	4,236	48.22%	72	0.82%
2000	3,011	44.14%	3,520	51.61%	290	4.25%
1996	2,048	39.32%	2,637	50.62%	524	10.06%
1992	2,333	43.37%	2,202	40.94%	844	15.69%

As of March 2011, there were a total of 12,196 registered voters in Tinton Falls, of which 3,425 (28.1%) were registered as Democrats, 2,731 (22.4%) were registered as Republicans and 6,033 (49.5%) were registered as Unaffiliated. There were 7 voters registered as Libertarians or Greens.

Gubernatorial election results for Tinton Falls
Year	Republican		Democratic		Third party(ies)	
Year	No.	%	No.	%	No.	%
2025	4,734	47.32%	5,219	52.17%	51	0.51%
2021	4,233	51.96%	3,831	47.03%	82	1.01%
2017	3,185	48.98%	3,178	48.87%	140	2.15%
2013	3,811	67.71%	1,759	31.25%	58	1.03%
2009	3,740	57.23%	2,307	35.30%	488	7.47%
2005	3,002	49.64%	2,822	46.66%	224	3.70%

In the 2012 presidential election, Democrat Barack Obama received 51.9% of the vote (4,788 cast), ahead of Republican Mitt Romney with 46.9% (4,329 votes), and other candidates with 1.2% (108 votes), among the 9,286 ballots cast by the borough's 12,714 registered voters (61 ballots were spoiled), for a turnout of 73.0%. In the 2008 presidential election, Democrat Barack Obama received 51.9% of the vote (5,065 cast), ahead of Republican John McCain with 45.9% (4,483 votes) and other candidates with 1.1% (104 votes), among the 9,763 ballots cast by the borough's 12,498 registered voters, for a turnout of 78.1%. In the 2004 presidential election, Republican George W. Bush received 50.7% of the vote (4,476 ballots cast), outpolling Democrat John Kerry with 48.0% (4,236 votes) and other candidates with 0.6% (72 votes), among the 8,825 ballots cast by the borough's 11,432 registered voters, for a turnout percentage of 77.2.

In the 2013 gubernatorial election, Republican Chris Christie received 67.7% of the vote (3,811 cast), ahead of Democrat Barbara Buono with 31.3% (1,759 votes), and other candidates with 1.0% (58 votes), among the 5,696 ballots cast by the borough's 12,784 registered voters (68 ballots were spoiled), for a turnout of 44.6%. In the 2009 gubernatorial election, Republican Chris Christie received 56.9% of the vote (3,740 ballots cast), ahead of Democrat Jon Corzine with 35.1% (2,307 votes), Independent Chris Daggett with 6.6% (437 votes) and other candidates with 0.8% (51 votes), among the 6,576 ballots cast by the borough's 12,354 registered voters, yielding a 53.2% turnout.

United States Senate election results for Tinton Falls1
Year	Republican		Democratic		Third party(ies)	
Year	No.	%	No.	%	No.	%
2024	5,359	47.84%	5,632	50.28%	210	1.87%
2018	4,205	48.82%	4,103	47.64%	305	3.54%
2012	4,295	49.04%	4,329	49.43%	134	1.53%
2006	2,757	48.43%	2,797	49.13%	139	2.44%

United States Senate election results for Tinton Falls2
Year	Republican		Democratic		Third party(ies)	
Year	No.	%	No.	%	No.	%
2020	5,650	46.57%	6,271	51.69%	210	1.73%
2014	2,247	47.99%	2,369	50.60%	66	1.41%
2013	1,858	47.22%	2,039	51.82%	38	0.97%
2008	4,313	48.25%	4,401	49.23%	225	2.52%

== Historic district ==
- Tinton Falls Historic District
- U.S. National Register of Historic Places
- U.S. Historic district
- New Jersey Register of Historic Places
- Location: Irregular pattern along County Route 537 (Tinton Avenue) and Sycamore Avenue
- Area: 40 acres (16 ha)
- Architectural style: Dutch Colonial
- NRHP reference No.: 77000888
- NJRHP No.: 2063

Significant dates
- Added to NRHP: November 10, 1977
- Designated NJRHP: July 2, 1976

The Tinton Falls Historic District is a historic district located at the intersection of County Route 537 (Tinton Avenue) and Sycamore Avenue. The district was added to the National Register of Historic Places on November 10, 1977, for its significance in archaeology, industry, military history and politics.

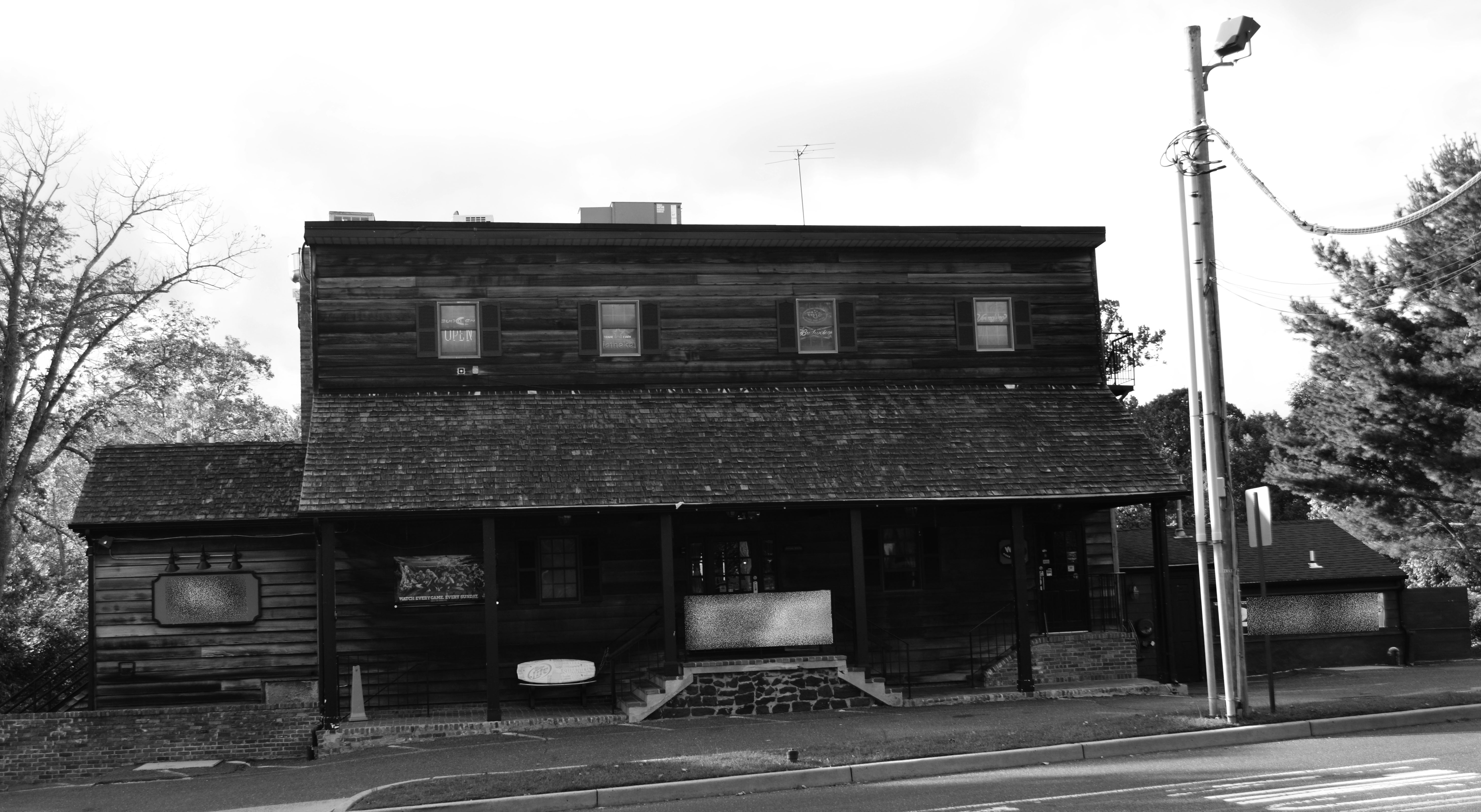
Old Mill at Tinton Falls

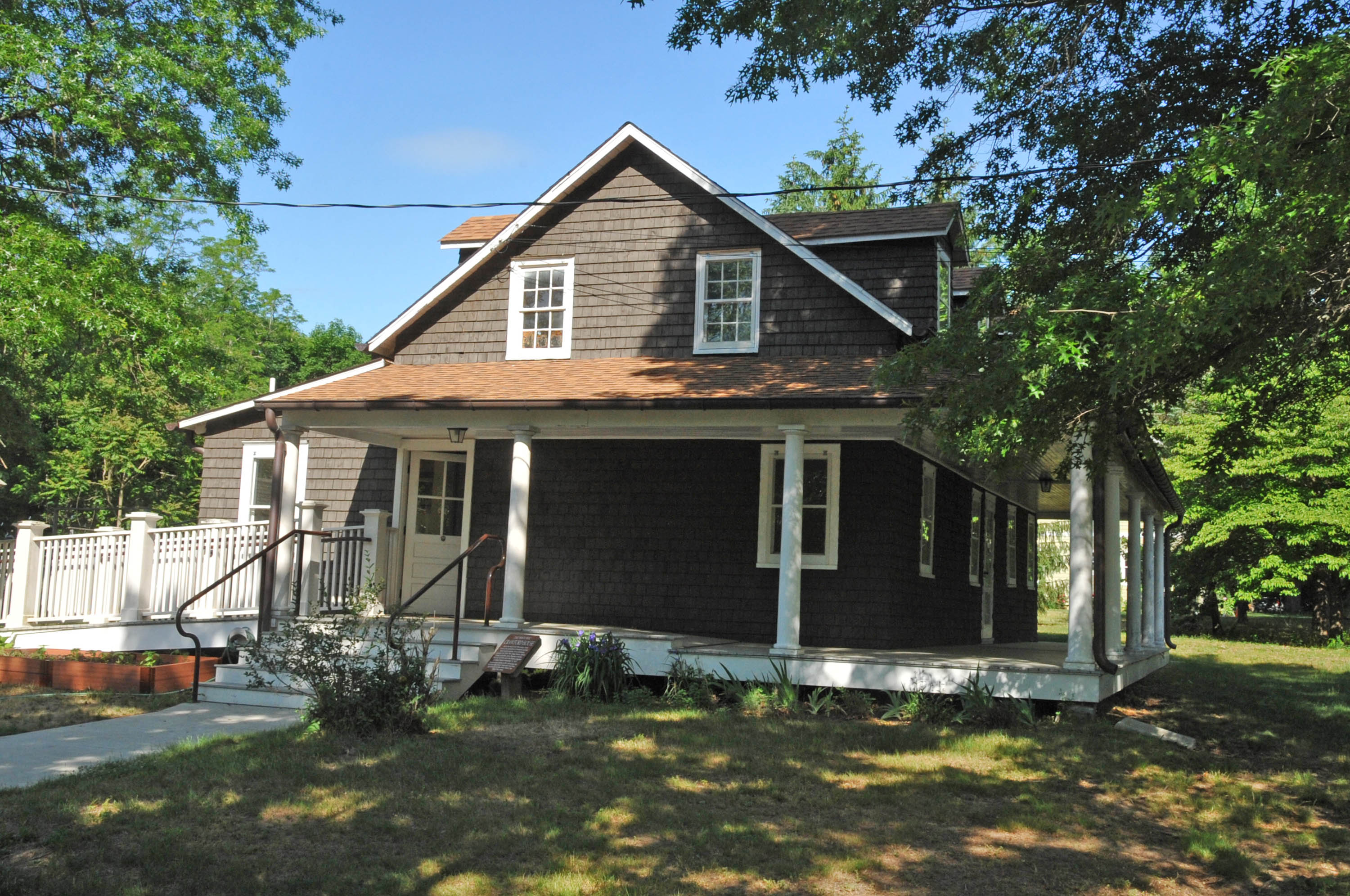
Crawford House

== Education ==
Public school students in kindergarten through eighth grade attend the three schools in the Tinton Falls School District, together with students from the neighboring community of Shrewsbury Township and the dependent children of military families based at Naval Weapons Station Earle. All three of the district's schools are located in Tinton Falls. Shrewsbury Township is represented with one seat out of nine on the district's board of education. As of the 2020–21 school year, the district, comprised of three schools, had an enrollment of 1,331 students and 153.4 classroom teachers (on an FTE basis), for a student–teacher ratio of 8.7:1. Schools in the district (with 2020–21 enrollment data from the National Center for Education Statistics) are Mahala F. Atchison Elementary School with 438 students in grades K–3, Swimming River Elementary School with 440 students in grades 4–5 and Tinton Falls Middle School with 446 students in grades 6–8.

Students in public school for ninth through twelfth grades attend Monmouth Regional High School, located in Tinton Falls. The school also serves students from Eatontown, Tinton Falls and Naval Weapons Station Earle. As of the 2020–21 school year, the high school had an enrollment of 953 students and 90.2 classroom teachers (on an FTE basis), for a student–teacher ratio of 10.6:1. Seats on the high school district's nine-member board of education are allocated based on the populations of the constituent municipalities, with five seats assigned to Tinton Falls.

Students may also apply to attend one of the magnet schools in the Monmouth County Vocational School District – Marine Academy of Science and Technology, Academy of Allied Health & Science, High Technology High School, Biotechnology High School, and Communications High School.

Ranney School is a coeducational, nonsectarian K–12 private school founded in 1960; its campus occupies 60 acres (24 ha) off of Hope Road. Trinity Hall is an all-girls independent high school in the Catholic tradition, founded in 2013.

== Infrastructure ==
=== Emergency services ===
The borough is protected by the Tinton Falls Police Department, led by Chief Michael DeLucia.

Tinton Falls is covered by four fire companies, split into two fire districts. Wayside Fire Company (36–2), founded in 1919, and Pinebrook Community Hose Company (36–3), founded in 1941, are in Fire District 1. Tinton Falls Fire Company No. 1 (36–1), established in 1932, and Northside Engine Company (36–4), founded in 1955, which make up Fire District 2.

=== Transportation ===
==== Roads and highways ====
As of May 2010, the borough had a total of 96.93 miles (155.99 km) of roadways, of which 65.99 miles (106.20 km) were maintained by the municipality, 17.77 miles (28.60 km) by Monmouth County, 4.22 miles (6.79 km) by the New Jersey Department of Transportation and 8.95 miles (14.40 km) by the New Jersey Turnpike Authority.

Major highways passing through Tinton Falls include the Garden State Parkway, Route 18, Route 33, and Route 66. Tinton Falls houses exits 100 (including the Judy Blume Service Area), 102, 105, and 109 on the parkway, including a high-speed toll gate, and the southern start/end of the express and local carriageways, although the borough is listed only on signs for exit 105.

Major county roads that pass through Tinton Falls are County Route 520, which enters from Middletown Township to the west, crosses the northern portion of the borough and proceeds east towards Red Bank to the north and Shrewsbury to the south, County Route 537 (Tinton Avenue), which also crosses the northern portion of the borough from Colts Neck Township to the west to Eatontown to the east) and County Route 547 (Shafto Road), which enters from Wall Township at the borough's southwest corner and proceeds northeast towards Eatontown.

Other limited access road that are accessible outside the borough include Interstate 195 in neighboring Wall Township.

==== Public transportation ====
===== Bus =====
Bus service is available from the Garden State Parkway to the Financial District in Lower Manhattan via Academy Bus Lines. Monmouth Park & Ride is located in nearby in neighboring Wall Township, off the Garden State Parkway at mile marker 100 (right before entering into Tinton Falls). It is an express route to New York City during peak rush-hour.

NJ Transit offers local bus service on the 836 and 838 routes.

===== Rail =====
NJ Transit offers passenger train service at the Red Bank station. Commuter service is provided on the North Jersey Coast Line, offering express and local service. Diesel service operates from Hoboken Terminal to Bay Head station. Electric service operates from New York Penn Station to Long Branch station, where the electrified portion of the line ends. Major mid-line stops include Newark Penn Station, Newark Liberty International Airport Station, and Secaucus Junction.

===== Aviation =====
Monmouth Executive Airport is located in neighboring Wall, as it supplies short-distance flights for private jets to surrounding areas. The nearest major commercial airport is Newark Liberty International Airport in Newark, which serves as a major hub for United Airlines, located 30 miles (48 km) north (about 45 minutes drive) from the center of Tinton Falls.

=== Healthcare ===
Jersey Shore University Medical Center is a 691-bed non-profit, tertiary research and academic medical center located in neighboring Neptune Township as part of the Hackensack Meridian Health system, serving the northern Jersey Shore region.

== Points of interest ==
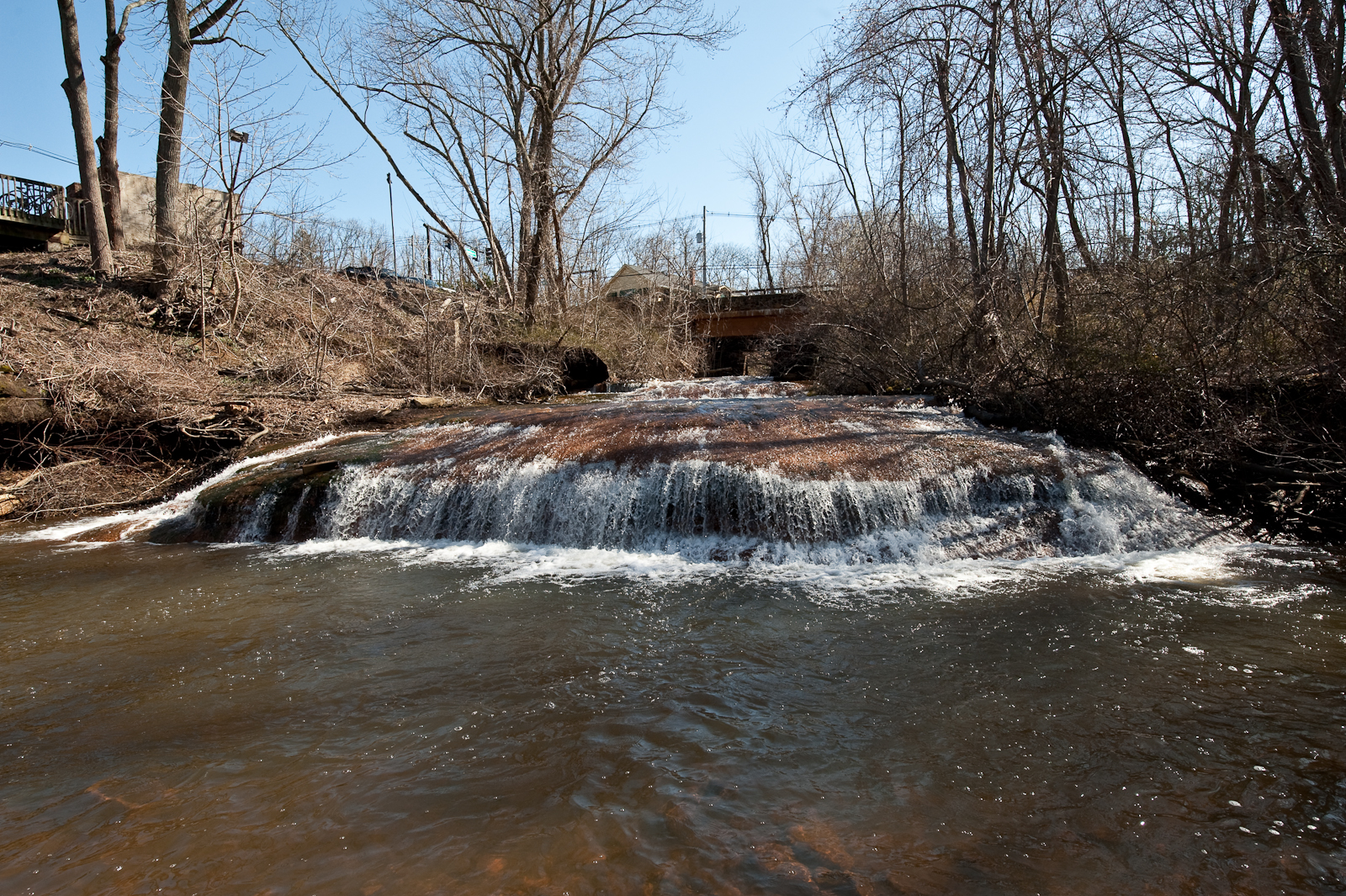
The waterfall of Tinton Falls

- Old Mill at Tinton Falls – constructed in 1676, the site was added to the National Register of Historic Places in 1973.
- Tinton Falls Library, one of the member libraries of the Monmouth County Library System. Established in 1961 as the New Shrewsbury Public Library Association, the name was changed to its current title in 1975. The library had been closed since August 2017, after an extensive mold infestation was discovered that required remediation. While the library is closed, residents can access books from other libraries in the county by obtaining a Monmouth County Library System card. After the remediation was completed, the library reopened in November 2024.

== Notable people ==
People who were born in, residents of, or otherwise closely associated with Tinton Falls include:

- Bryan Antoine (born 2000), college basketball player for the Villanova Wildcats men's basketball team
- Kelly J. Breen (born 1969), trainer of thoroughbred racehorses
- Freeman Craw (1917–2017), typeface designer
- Ernabel Demillo (born 1965), television journalist who is the host and producer of CUNY TV's Asian American Life
- Tom Gallagher (1940–2018), diplomat, who in 1976, became the first officer of the United States Foreign Service to come out as gay
- Alan Garcia (born 1985), thoroughbred horse racing jockey
- Robert Giroux (1914–2008), book editor and publisher who was a partner in what became known as Farrar, Straus and Giroux
- Sean Goldman (born 2000), boy in the center of an international custody dispute between his American father and Brazilian mother
- Milton Goode (born 1960), retired high jumper who represented the United States at the 1984 Summer Olympics in Los Angeles
- Michelle Leonardo (born 1990), dancer, model, winner of several beauty pageants
- Joe Maneely (1926–1958), artist who co-created Marvel Comics characters the Black Knight, the Ringo Kid, the Yellow Claw, and Jimmy Woo
- Amir Meshal (c. 1982), American citizen detained by Kenya, Somalia and Ethiopia during the Somalia War (2006–2009)
- John Muller (born 1966), television journalist with ABC News, where his anchor duties include World News Now and ABC News Now
- Brianne Reed (born 1994), soccer player who plays as a defender for FC Nordsjælland in Denmark's Elitedivisionen league
- Ranya Senhaji (born 2002), footballer who plays as a forward for the South Carolina Gamecocks and the Morocco women's national team
- Ivy Troutman (1884–1979), Broadway actress
- Quentin Wheeler (born 1955, class of 1974), track and field athlete who came in fourth in the 400 meters hurdles at the 1976 Summer Olympics
- Bill Winters (born 1954), offensive lineman in the National Football League, Canadian Football League, American Football Association and United States Football League
- Dorothy Young (1907–2011), entertainer, stage assistant to magician Harry Houdini
- Daryn Zhunussov (born 1991), ice dancer from Kazakhstan
