= Monmouth Mall =

Shopping center in Eatontown, New Jersey

- Monmouth Mall during its transition to Monmouth Square in August 2025
- Location: 180 Route 35 South; Eatontown, NJ 07724, U.S.
- Coordinates: 40.287°N 74.0556°W
- Opened: March 1, 1960; 66 years ago
- Closed: August 2024; 2 years ago (interior)
- Developer: Massachusetts Mutual Life
- Manager: Westminster Management
- Owner: Kushner Companies
- Num. of stores: 30 (formerly 150)
- Num. of anchor tenants: 2 (formerly 4)
- Floor area: 1,500,000 square feet (140,000 m^{2})
- Floors: 1 in original wing, 2 in expansion (expansion has since been demolished) (3 in Boscov's and Macy's)
- Parking: Parking lot and former 3-story parking garage adjacent to Boscov's
- Public transit: NJ Transit bus: 831, 832
- Website: monmouthmallonline.com

Monmouth Mall, currently undergoing redevelopment into an open-air center named Monmouth Square, is a commercial and residential complex in Eatontown, New Jersey. Located at the intersection of Route 35, Route 36, and Wyckoff Road (CR 547), it is owned by Kushner Companies. Prior to its current redevelopment, it was an enclosed split-level shopping center with a gross leasable area of 1,500,000 sq ft (140,000 m^{2}), making it the sixth-largest shopping mall in New Jersey.

The center opened on March 1, 1960, as the open-air Monmouth Shopping Center, with a single-level layout organized around two anchor department stores. In 1975 it was enclosed, renamed Monmouth Mall, and roughly doubled in size by a two-level expansion that brought in three additional anchors. A 1987 renovation modernized the interior, and a mid-1990s expansion added a Jersey Shore–themed food court and a 15-screen multiplex. A final round of cosmetic updates followed in the early 2010s. The interior of the mall closed to the public in August 2024 for demolition.

As of March 2026, the property is undergoing a $500 million de-malling process to convert the site into an open-air retail and residential complex. The redevelopment, which officially broke ground in May 2024, will reduce the retail footprint to approximately 900,000 sq ft (84,000 m^{2}) to make way for a public green space, medical office space, and a residential component featuring 1,000 apartment units. While the project is estimated to be complete by 2028, the site continues to be anchored by Macy's, Boscov's, and an AMC Theatres multiplex, with a new Whole Foods Market expected to open on July 29, 2026.

== History ==
=== Origins and development ===
==== Land assembly and zoning controversy ====
Before the then-named Monmouth Shopping Center was developed, most of the 64-acre site consisted of a 43-acre farm owned by Albert E. Adams. Following his death in 1954, the property passed to his son, Oliver. In January 1956, amid reports that a Newark firm was collecting options on nearby parcels, a Newark "dummy company" named the Monmouth Restaurant and Motel Company purchased the Adams farmland for $200,000 (equivalent to $2.23 million in 2025). A New York City attorney representing the company declined to name their client, stating only that the land was bought for resale.

The involvement of out-of-town developers and the use of a mystery company drew skepticism. The sale was finalized on a Friday; the following Wednesday, the Eatontown Borough Council introduced an amendment to rezone the farmland from an R-3 residential zone to business and light industry. Eatontown Mayor F. Bliss Price denied knowing whether the farm had been sold or that the buyers had requested a zoning change. The Monmouth Restaurant and Motel Company later sold the land to the Massachusetts Mutual Life Insurance Company.

==== Design and construction ====
Groundbreaking for the $15 million project (equivalent to $167.39 million in 2025) took place on May 12, 1958. The Newark real estate firm Feist & Feist, Inc., headed by Irving J. Feist, served as the exclusive rental agent. The center was designed by the New York City architectural firm Kahn & Jacobs, with engineering by Abbott, Merkt & Company.

The 64-acre site was planned for regional automobile access, with ten entrances and exits connecting to the Garden State Parkway, Route 35, and Wyckoff Road, developed in cooperation with state, county, and Parkway Authority officials. Parking for approximately 4,500 cars surrounded the buildings. Within the site, the architects rejected the long corridors common in earlier shopping centers in favor of a "cluster plan." Stores were grouped around the two anchor department stores and organized by shopping category, making it easier for shoppers to compare prices and styles. The malls between buildings featured redwood benches, decorative fountains, and protective canopies.

The finished project used 4,200 tons of steel across 14 buildings, totaling 600,000 square feet (56,000 m^{2}) of leasable retail space. To maximize interior selling space, individual heating and cooling units were installed on the roofs of each store rather than in a central plant. Bamberger's, the largest anchor, was built across three levels and included an auditorium for community events.

=== Monmouth Shopping Center (1960–1974) ===
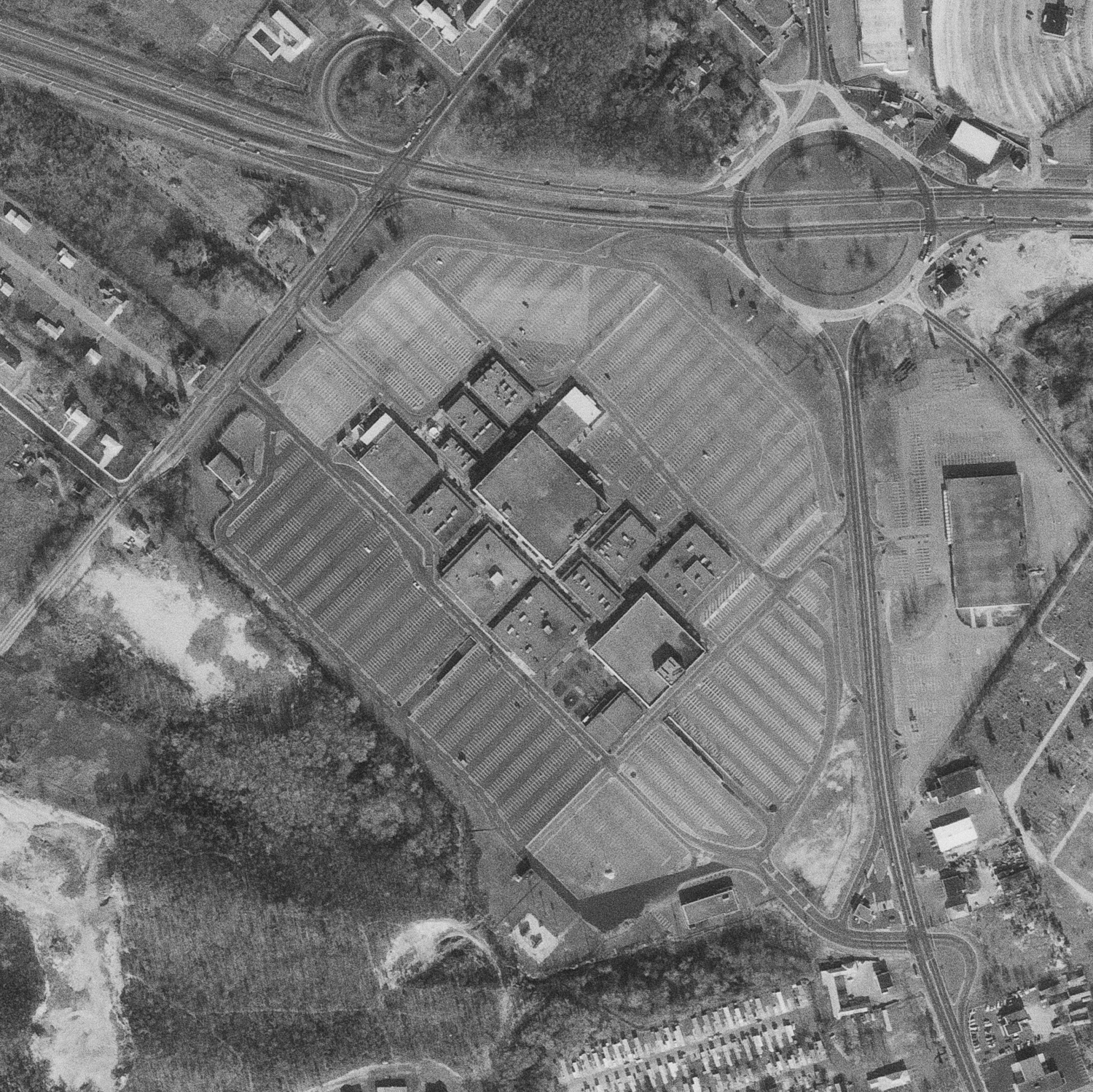
Monmouth Shopping Center in its original open-air configuration, photographed in November 1969.

On February 12, 1960, the center was dedicated to "the famous Americans of Monmouth County — past, present and future," with the words inscribed in marble over a time capsule at the base of the center's three flagpoles. As part of the ceremony, local Boy Scouts placed objects representing the past, present, and future into the capsule, including historical documents from Monmouth County residents, the center's architectural plans, and a copy of the newest Boy Scout Handbook. The time capsule has since been lost following subsequent renovations to the property.

Monmouth Shopping Center officially opened March 1, 1960. An estimated 85,000 people attended the opening, filling the 4,200-car parking lot throughout the day. The heavy turnout caused severe traffic congestion at the Eatontown Circle, requiring state police from Shrewsbury and Keyport to assist local authorities in directing traffic. At one point, a bus took 10 minutes to travel just part of the way around the circle. To celebrate the opening, management gave $50 bank accounts to the first boy and girl born in the county that day and launched 3,000 helium-filled balloons.

Twelve of the center's more than 50 stores began operations on opening day. Bamberger's was the largest anchor tenant, occupying 233,000 square feet and featuring murals by artist Howard Pedersen. Montgomery Ward was scheduled to open the center's second-largest store, a 120,000-square-foot branch, in mid-May. Other initial tenants included Franklin Simon, Food Fair, and S.S. Kresge. Montgomery Ward was replaced by Alexander's in 1971.

Promoted by public relations director Henry Mangravite as a "true village green," the shopping center hosted concerts, rallies, and holiday celebrations. In August 1968, jazz pianist Teddy Wilson performed for an outdoor audience at the center. On October 19, 1968, Republican presidential nominee Richard Nixon spoke to a crowd of 10,000 in the rain, promising peace in Vietnam and an end to rising inflation. On November 28, 1969, to kick off the Christmas shopping season, Lee Guilfoyle, an instructor at the Lakewood Sport Parachute Club, dressed as Santa Claus and parachuted from 5,000 feet into the parking lot next to Bamberger's before "one of the largest crowds ever to gather at Monmouth Shopping Center."

=== Monmouth Mall (1975–2023) ===
==== Enclosure and early expansions (1975–1989) ====
The mall was enclosed and expanded to its current size in 1975. The older section of the mall continued to have one level while the new expansion included two levels that were anchored by Hahne's on March 5, 1975, JCPenney on September 8, 1976, and Abraham & Straus in 1978. Alexander's closed in January 1983 and was succeeded by Caldor's, a discount department store.

In 1987, the mall was renovated. The renovation brought in new lighting, new flooring, and new glass and chrome handrails along the second level. The renovation also removed the in-floor planters and replaced them with movable planters. The renovation also closed off the entrance near the former arcade on the Wyckoff Road side of the old wing; and raised the lowered seating areas in front of the anchors.

Ashley Tisdale was discovered at the mall in 1989 as a three-year-old.

==== Renovations and anchor changes (1990–2011) ====
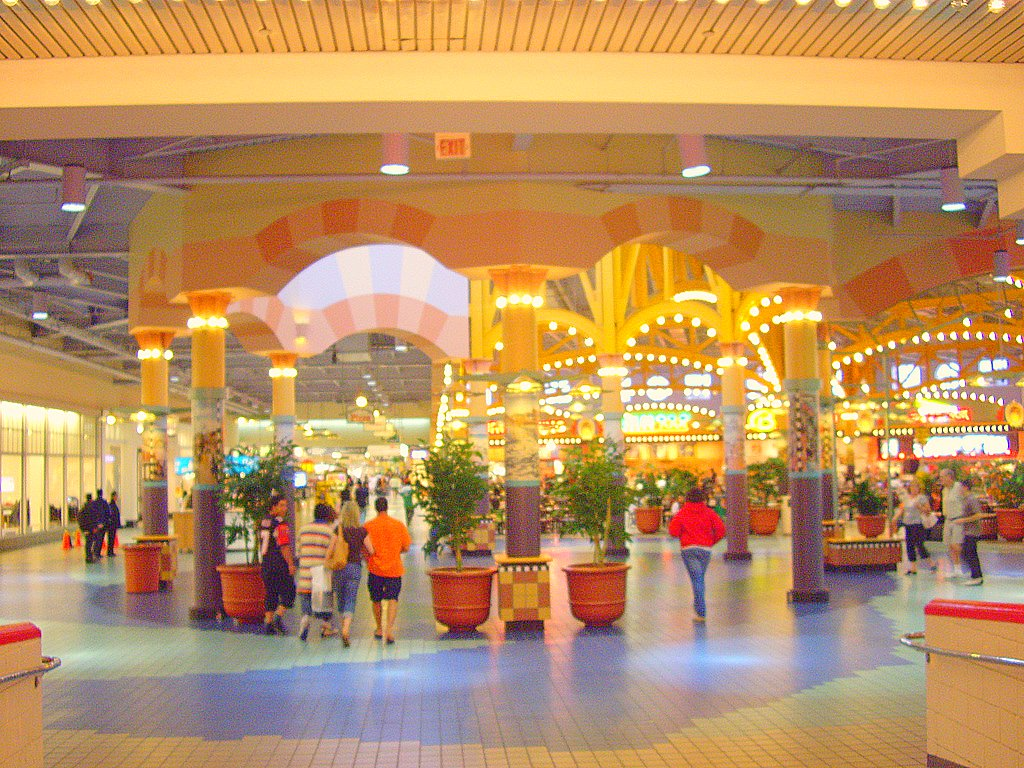
Monmouth Mall expanded to include a food court between 1994 and 1996, themed after the Jersey Shore.

Through the years, Monmouth Mall has seen a fluctuation of different anchors. Anchor changes consisted of Caldor replacing the former Alexander's in 1983, Macy's replacing Bamberger's in 1986, Lord & Taylor replacing the former Hahne's in 1990, Stern's replacing Abraham & Straus in 1995 and Boscov's replacing the former Stern's in 2001.

In 1994–1996, the mall was expanded to include an elevator and a food court (modeled after a Jersey Shore theme) including 1920s-style beach photos wrapped around the columns in the older section of the mall, as well as Nobody Beats the Wiz, a new 15-screen Loews Theatres (now AMC). Old Navy replaced the closed Caldor. The mall also saw minor cosmetic changes that consisted of replacing black with sky blue in the color schemes through painting and retiling, as well as new lighting along the pillars.

Monmouth Mall went through another significant expansion in 2009. In mid-2010, cosmetic renovations started at the mall including new tile, paint, lighting, and a complete overhaul of the food court. The renovations lasted until summer 2011.

==== Ownership changes and retail decline (2012–2023) ====
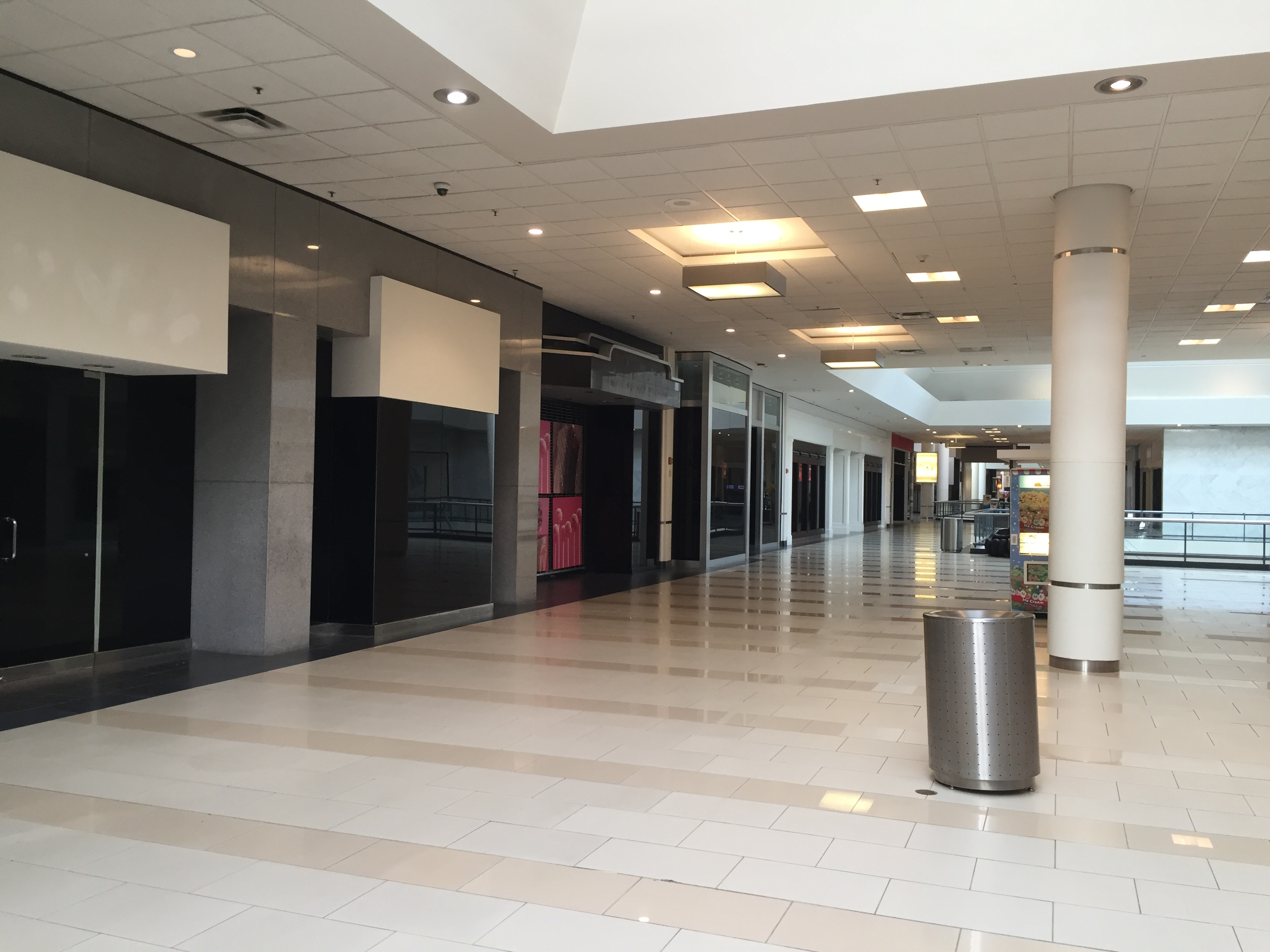
The central promenade in 2023. While retaining its 2009–2011 remodel, the corridor is lined with vacant shops, a result of the late-2010s retail decline.

In 2012, Vornado Realty Trust announced plans to sell its portfolio of enclosed shopping malls. In August 2015, Vornado's fifty percent stake and management in the Monmouth Mall was sold to co-owner Kushner Companies for $38 million. In 2021, Brookfield sold the mall outright to Kushner Companies.

Through the 2010s and 2020s, many stores began to close due to the changing retail environment. In 2010, Planet Fitness opened at Monmouth Mall, but eventually relocated to a new store in Shrewsbury in 2022. On September 7, 2018, it was announced that Lord & Taylor would be closing as part of a plan to close 10 stores nationwide; the store closed in January 2019. On June 22, 2020, Crate & Barrel opened a temporary close out store on the 1st floor in the former Lord & Taylor space, which has since closed.

In June 2022, it was announced that JCPenney would exit the mall after 47 years in operation; it closed on October 23, 2022. The same year, the mall announced that the parking garage would be demolished due to structural instability. Several smaller retailers also departed around this time: Norman's Hallmark Cards Inc. relocated to West Long Branch, Spencer's Gifts moved to Jersey Shore Premium Outlets in Tinton Falls, and in December 2023, Forever 21 announced it would close its mall doors in January 2024.

== Redevelopment ==
=== Early proposals (2016–2018) ===
Monmouth Mall Exterior Drive-Around (July 2023) (6:26)
A 2023 drive-around tour showing the exterior layout of the now-demolished Monmouth Mall.

In February 2016, Monmouth Mall owner Kushner Companies announced conceptual plans to redevelop the mall into a pedestrian-friendly "live, work and play" development at a cost of approximately $500 million. Renamed the "Monmouth Town Center", the proposal included residential apartments, a hotel, retail space, entertainment, and dining options. The proposal also included an outdoor plaza, green spaces, and a biker- and pedestrian-friendly streetscape. The residential component was intended to include one- and two-bedroom apartment units to minimize impacts on local traffic and public school systems. Kushner Companies's then-CEO Jared Kushner noted the struggle faced by traditional enclosed shopping malls in the 21st century, and consumer trends of the Millennial generation as catalysts behind the redevelopment.

On April 27 of that year, a public meeting was held in a local middle school gymnasium where Eatontown's mayor Dennis Connelly and the Borough Council spoke out against a zoning change that would allow the expansion of the mall. Several borough residents also spoke out against the redevelopment, and Kushner announced the abandonment of the project at the same meeting.

A new proposal issued in January 2018, named "The Heights At Monmouth," suggested the demolition of the two-story wing that includes Boscov's and covers 300,000 square feet (28,000 m^{2}) and new additions that would bring the mall's total gross leasable area to 1,500,000 square feet (140,000 m^{2}). Kushner partnered with Rouse Properties (now Brookfield Properties) for this iteration, which was approved on July 16, 2018. The plans included opening up the two-story mall corridor, creating new outdoor corridors, and the addition of 700 residential apartment units, of which 88 would be designated as affordable housing.

=== Monmouth Square (2023–present) ===
In April 2023, the local government of Eatontown officially agreed to updated redevelopment plans to turn the mall into an improved commercial area dubbed "Monmouth Square." The proposed residential section, which includes the construction of apartments, will eventually become known as "Monmouth Village."

Demolition of empty sections of the mall, including the location of Monmouth Mall's former Lord & Taylor, began at the end of 2023. On August 1, 2023, it was revealed that one of the first retailers for the updated mall would be Whole Foods. The supermarket is planned to open in the original footprint of the mall's Barnes & Noble, with the bookstore relocating to a different section of the complex.

The interior of Monmouth Mall, including the food court, was closed to the public in mid-August 2024; businesses with exterior entrances remained open. As of 2025, the remaining businesses operating in the footprint of the former mall include Buffalo Wild Wings, Macy's, Barnes & Noble, Boscov's, LensCrafters and AMC.
