= List of NJ Transit bus routes (800–880) =

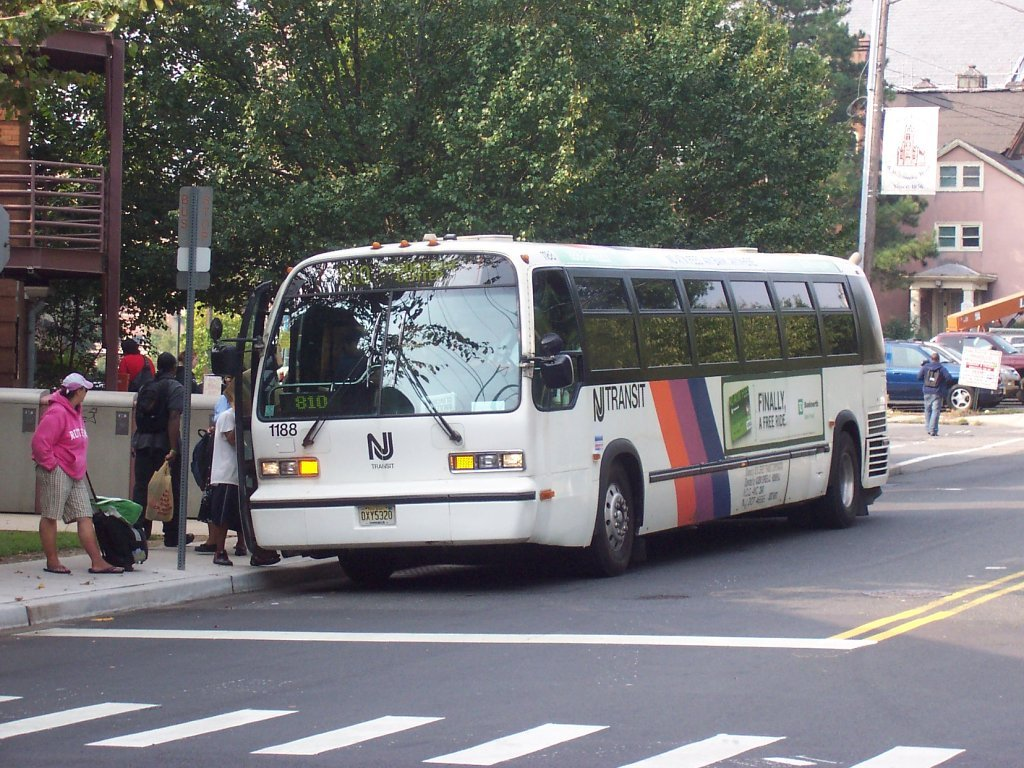
New Jersey Transit RTS #1188 in operation on the 810 line in New Brunswick

New Jersey Transit operates or contracts operation of the following routes within Middlesex, Monmouth, and Morris counties. All routes are exact fare lines.

== Metropark loops ==
These routes serve office parks around Metropark are operated from Suburban Transit New Brunswick garage. All routes operate during rush hours only.

Route	Serving	Terminal	History
801	Lincoln Highway; Oak Tree Road	Edison; JFK Medical Center	Formerly route 1A/1B.; Introduced in 1980.; Formerly served the Metuchen Rail Station in the early 1980's
802	Green Street; Gill Lane	Woodbridge; Woodbridge Corporate Park	Formerly route 2.; Introduced in 1980.
803	Gill Lane; Woodbridge Center Drive	Woodbridge; Woodbridge Center OR; Woodbridge Station	Formerly route 3.; Introduced in 1985.
804	Wood Avenue	Edison; Wood Ave/Inman Ave.	Introduced in 1994.
805	Thornall Street; Ford Avenue	Edison; Menlo Park Mall OR; Ford Ave/Main St.	Introduced in 1997.

== Middlesex County local routes ==
These routes are operated from Suburban Transit's New Brunswick garage. Below is the full route.

Route	Terminals		Major Points	Notes	History
810	New Brunswick Station	Woodbridge Center	Route 27, Metuchen Station, Menlo Park Mall		Formerly route M10.; Operates over former Middlesex Bus Company's routes 8 and 9.
811	New Brunswick St. Peter's Hospital	South River	New Brunswick Station, George Street, Georges Road, Rues Lane, Brunswick Square	Weekday service only	Formerly route M11.; Acquired by PSCT as route 58.
813	Middlesex College	Perth Amboy	Metuchen Station, New Brunswick Avenue, Perth Amboy Station	No Sunday service; Select weekday trips serve Heller Industrial Park.	Formerly route M13.; Acquired by PSCT as route 4.
814	Middlesex College	North Brunswick; DeVry University or Fashion Plaza	Lincoln Highway (Edison trips only), Livingston Avenue	Only weekday trips serve DeVry University.	Formerly route M14.; Acquired by Middlesex Bus as route 14.
815	New Brunswick Station	Woodbridge Center	Route 18, Washington Road, Sayreville Park and Ride, South Amboy Station, Perth Amboy Station		Formerly route M15.; Acquired by PSCT as route 2.; Shared schedule with the M18 until the mid-2000s
817	Perth Amboy	Belford Campbell's Junction	Perth Amboy Station, South Amboy Station, Florence Avenue, Route 36	No Sunday service	Formerly route M17.; Originally Monmouth Bus Lines route 7.
818	New Brunswick Station	Old Bridge	Route 18, Brunswick Square, County Route 516		Formerly route M18. Introduced by Middlesex Bus in 1976.; Shared schedule with the M15 until the mid-2000s
819	Metuchen Station or South Plainfield	Piscataway	Plainfield Avenue (Metuchen trips only), South Clinton Avenue (South Plainfield trips only), Watchung Avenue, Plainfield Station	Saturday service runs between Piscataway and South Plainfield.; No Sunday service	Formerly Plainfield Transit route M19.; Originally operated as separate routes 16 and 20.

== Plainfield local service ==
This route is operated from Suburban Transit's New Brunswick garage.

Route	Terminals		Major Points	Notes	History
822	Plainfield	North Plainfield; North Plainfield Shopping Center	Woodland Avenue, Greenbrook Road	No Sunday service	Formerly Plainfield Transit route 18/22.; Acquired as separate routes 18 and 22.

== Monmouth County local service ==
These lines are operated by New Jersey Transit from its garage in Neptune, New Jersey. Below is the full route except for branching. Routes were originally operated by Transdev until October 1, 2023 due to poor maintenance and management.

Route	Terminals		Major Points	Notes	History
830	Asbury Park Station	Point Pleasant Beach Station	Main Street, F Street, Route 71	No Sunday service	Formerly route M20; renamed 830 on September 1, 2001.
831	Red Bank Station	Long Branch Station	Route 35, Monmouth Mall, Route 36	Sunday service runs between Long Branch and Monmouth Mall.	Formerly route M21; renamed 831 on September 1, 2001.
832	Lincroft; Brookdale Community College	Wall Township; Brookdale Community College Wall Campus	Red Bank Station, Route 35, Monmouth Mall, Seaview Square Mall, Asbury Park Station	Evening and Sunday service does not serve Brookdale Community College.; Nighttime weekday and Saturday service to North Asbury Park	Formerly route M22; renamed 832 on September 1, 2001.; Extended to Brookdale Community College on September 3, 2016, and then to the Wall Campus on August 30, 2025; previously, service ended at Kingsley Avenue in Asbury Park.
834	Red Bank Station	Highlands	Leonardville Road, Route 36	No Sunday service	Formerly route M24; renamed 834 on September 1, 2001.
836	Asbury Park Station	Freehold Township; CentraState Medical Center	Route 33, Jersey Shore University Medical Center, Jersey Shore Premium Outlets, Freehold Center		Formerly route M26; renamed 836 on September 1, 2001.; Began service to Neptune Wal-Mart on April 3, 2004.
837	Long Branch Station	Seaview Square Mall	Monmouth Medical Center, Norwood Avenue, Monmouth University, Asbury Park Station	No Sunday service	Formerly route M27; renamed 837 on September 1, 2001.
838	Sea Bright	Freehold Raceway Mall	Colts Neck Road, River Road, Front Street	Saturday service runs between Sea Bright and Brookdale Community College.; No Sunday service	Formerly routes M23 and M25, which were renamed 833 and 835 respectively on September 1, 2001. These routes were combined on September 3, 2016 to create 838.

== Morris County local service ==
Most of these routes were renumbered from MCM- routes (with some modifications) in October 2010 and were formerly operated as contract service by PABCO Transit. Service is subsidized by the Morris County Board of County Commissioners and operates under the NJ Transit Morris, Inc. subsidiary out of Morris Garage. All routes do not operate on Sundays.

Route	Terminals		Major streets	Notes	History
871	Morristown; Headquarters Plaza	Willowbrook Mall	Parsippany Road, Route 202, Route 23	Some trips only operate between Morristown and Boonton.; No Sunday Service	Service initiated on October 4, 2010.; Formerly MCM1.
872	Morristown Station	Parsippany–Troy Hills; Mack-Cali	Route 202, Route 10	Weekday service only	Service initiated on October 4, 2010.; Replaced most of MCM2.; Route shortened from Livingston Mall to Mack-Cali in Parsippany–Troy Hills as of September 5, 2015.
873	Livingston Mall	Greystone Park Psychiatric Hospital	John F Kennedy Parkway, Route 124, West Hanover Avenue	No Sunday service	Service initiated on October 4, 2010.; Formerly MCM3.
874	Morristown; Headquarters Plaza	Willowbrook Mall	North Jefferson Road, Route 46	No Sunday service	Service initiated on October 4, 2010.
875	Morristown Station	Ledgewood Mall	Route 10, Route 53, Route 202	Weekday service only	Service initiated on October 4, 2010.; Formerly parts of MCM2.
878	Florham Park; FDU Campus	Convent Station	Punch Bowl Road, Madison Avenue, Danforth Road, Florham Road	Operates as a loop.; Weekday service only during rush hours.	This route, originally split from route 966, was formerly contracted by Saddle River Trails.; Absorbed route 879 on January 25, 2016.
880	Morristown Station	Rockaway Townsquare Mall	West Main Street, Route 46, Route 53, Route 202	No Sunday service	Service initiated on October 4, 2010.; Formerly MCM10.; Formerly 10 under PSCT.

== Former routes ==
This list includes routes that have been discontinued. The "M" routes pre-date the changeover to 800-series routes, so they are shown with their old denomination in the M-series.

Route	Terminals		Major streets	History
M16	Edison	Edison Station		Discontinued, ran as a loop similar to current Metropark loops 801–805.
M28	Asbury Park	Monmouth University	New Jersey Route 71	Most of line discontinued, some covered by current 837.
M29	Point Pleasant	Lakewood	New Jersey Route 88	Most of route covered by the 317 line. When NJT discontinued M29, route was turned over to Ocean County Area Transportation (OCAT) who operated it as their OC29 route. Today it is OC4.
M31	PNC Bank Arts Center	Aberdeen–Matawan Station	Garden State Parkway	Now run by private operator.
833	Red Bank Station	Freehold Raceway Mall	Colts Neck Road	Formerly route M23; renamed 833 on September 1, 2001.; Weekday service only; Service to Luftman Towers in Lincroft was discontinued on June 22, 2002, due to requests from local officials.; Combined into route 838 on September 3, 2016.
835	Red Bank Station	Sea Bright	River Road	Formerly route M25; renamed 835 on September 1, 2001.; No Sunday service; Combined into route 838 on September 3, 2016.
879	Florham Park; FDU Campus	Convent Station	Madison Avenue, Danforth Road, Florham Road	Merged with route 878 on January 25, 2016.
