= New Jersey Route 66 =

State highway in Monmouth County, New Jersey, US

Route 66

Route information
- Maintained by NJDOT
- Length: 3.62 mi (5.83 km)
- Existed: January 1, 1953–present

Major junctions
- West end: Route 33 in Tinton Falls
- G.S. Parkway in Tinton Falls; Route 18 in Neptune Township
- East end: Route 35 / CR 16 in Neptune Township

Location
- Country: United States
- State: New Jersey
- Counties: Monmouth

Highway system
- New Jersey State Highway Routes; Interstate; US; State; Scenic Byways
← Route 65	→ Route 67
← Route 33	NJ 33A	→ Route 34

Route 66 is a state highway located entirely in Monmouth County, New Jersey, United States. It runs 3.62 mi (5.83 km) between Route 33 in Tinton Falls and Route 35 at County Route 16 on the border of Ocean Township and Neptune Township, just west of Asbury Park. The route serves as an important connector between the Garden State Parkway to the west and Route 18 and Asbury Park to the east. It runs concurrent with County Route 16 from Bowne/Wayside Roads to the eastern terminus at Route 35. Route 66, which varies from a two-lane undivided road to a four-lane divided highway, passes through commercial areas for most of its length with some wooded areas. The route was created in 1953, replacing what had been Route 33A (formerly the Route 33-35 Link). There is currently a proposal to widen the two-lane portion between Jumping Brook Road and Wayside Road in order to better handle the traffic that uses this road.

== Route description ==
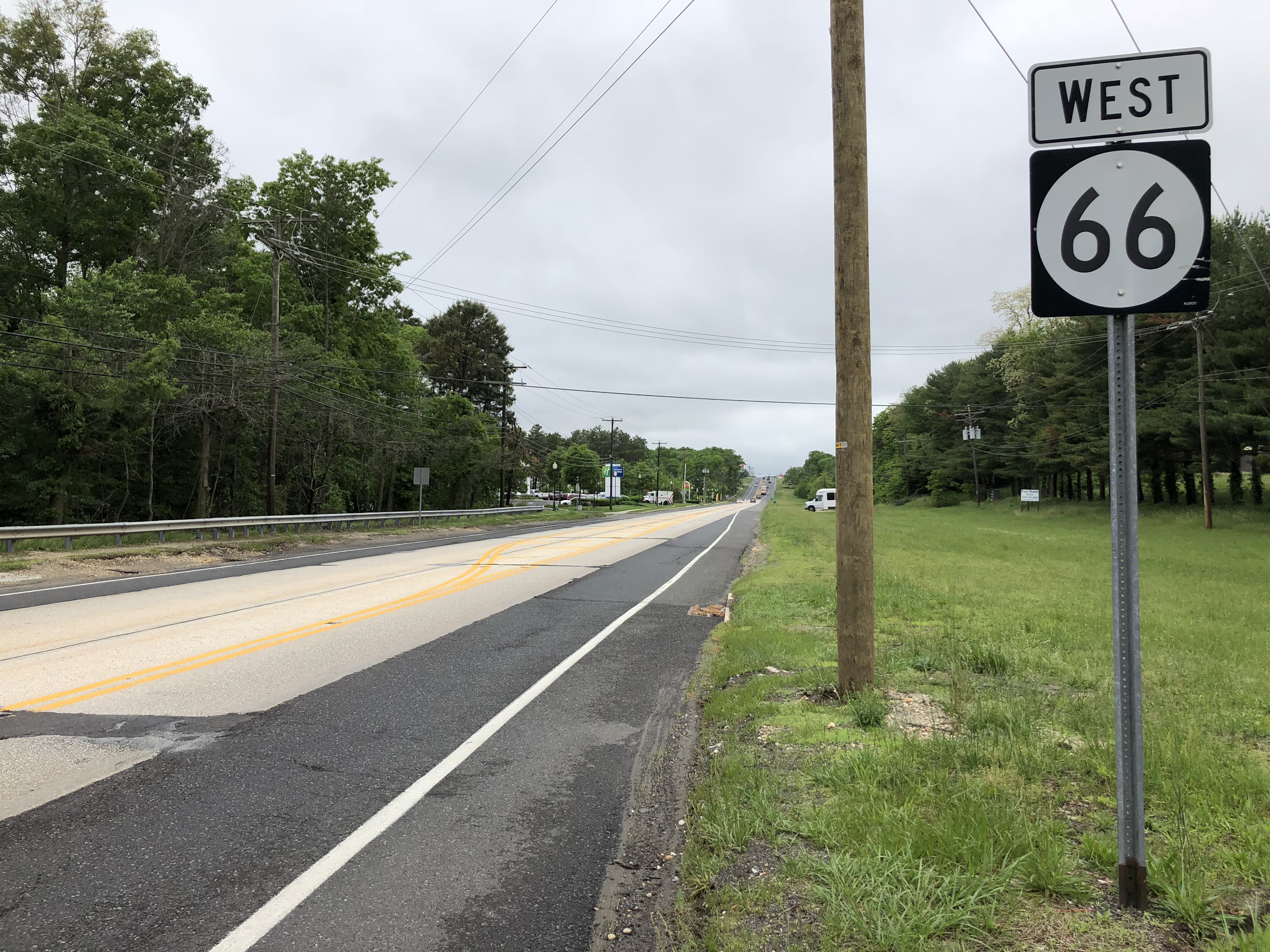
Route 66 westbound just past Green Grove Road in Neptune Township.

Route 66 begins at an intersection with Route 33 in Tinton Falls, heading to the northeast as a two-lane road. A short distance past Route 33, it comes to an interchange with the Garden State Parkway, where the road becomes a three lane undivided road with one eastbound lane and two westbound lanes. Past this interchange, the route heads into commercial areas, where it widens into a four-lane divided highway that passes south of the Jersey Shore Premium Outlets, with an interchange serving the outlet mall at Premium Outlets Boulevard/Hovchild Boulevard. Following this, the road heads into Neptune Township.

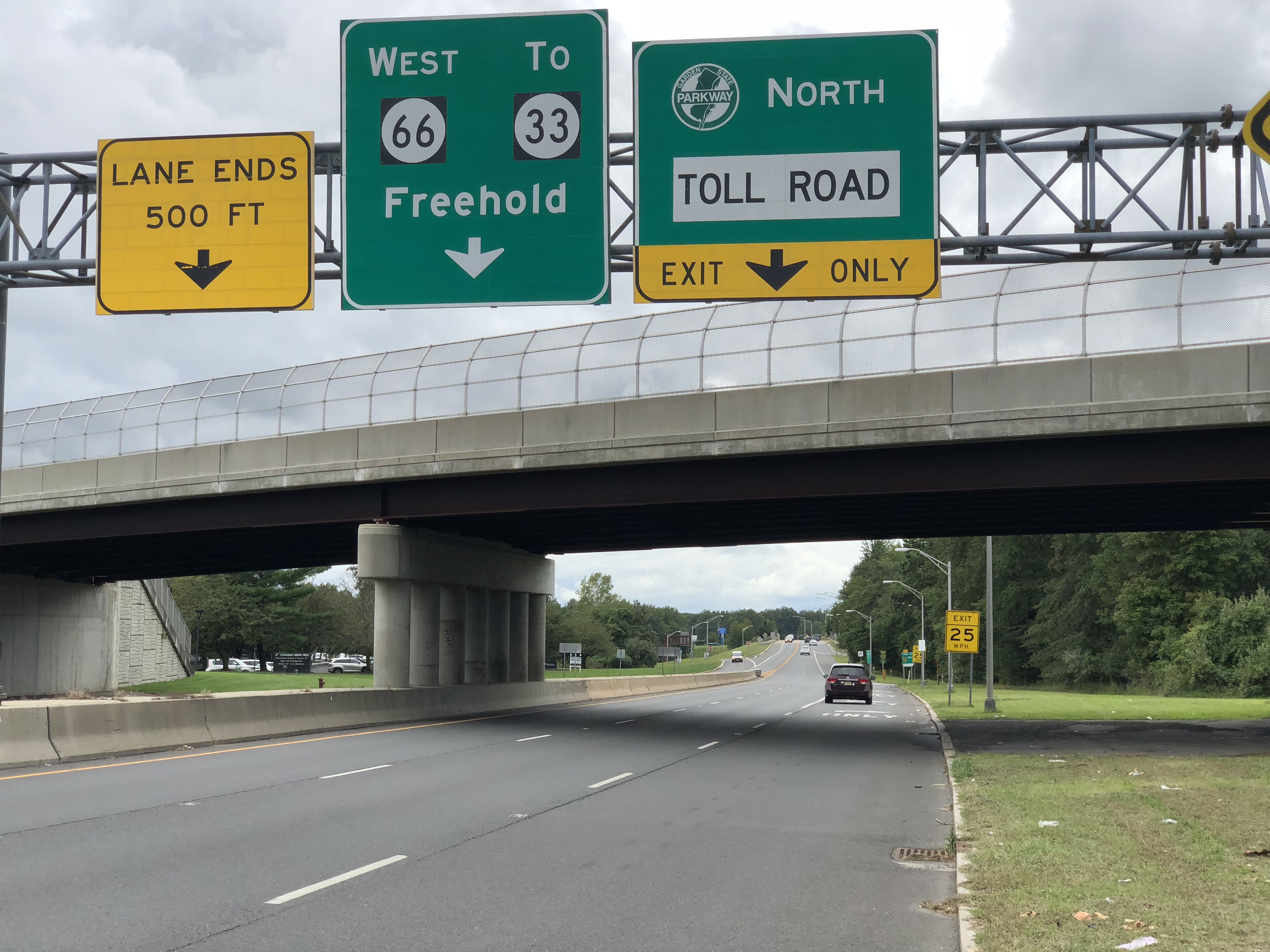
Route 66 westbound at the Garden State Parkway entering Tinton Falls from Neptune Township

After the intersection with Jumping Brook Road, the divided highway ends and Route 66 becomes a two-lane undivided road. The route heads through an area of woods before passing more businesses and coming to an intersection with County Route 16 (Asbury Avenue). Here, the road becomes a four-lane divided highway again and heads east along the border of Ocean Township to the north and Neptune Township to the south, concurrent with County Route 16. It passes through woodland before coming to a cloverleaf interchange with Route 18. Past Route 18, the road heads into commercial areas again, with the Seaview Square Shopping Center located to the north of the route. Route 66 ends at the Asbury Park Circle with Route 35, where County Route 16 continues east toward Asbury Park on Asbury Avenue.

== History ==
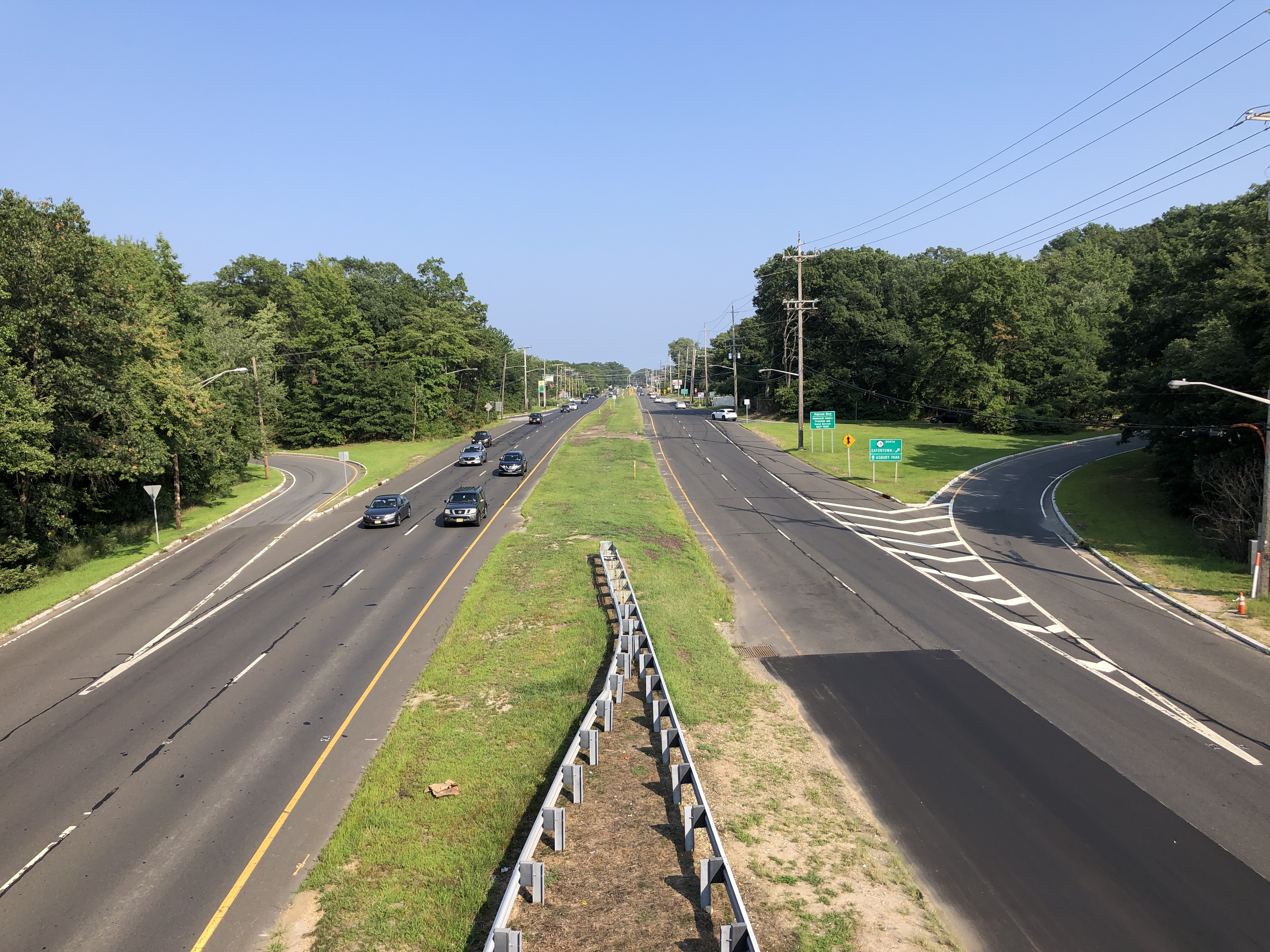
Route 66 eastbound at Route 18 in Neptune Township

Route 66 was legislated in the 1953 New Jersey state highway renumbering to replace what had been Route 33-35 Link and Route 33A. There is currently a proposal to widen the two-lane portions of Route 66 between Jumping Brook Road and Wayside Road. The need for this widening is due to the need to handle traffic going to Asbury Park in the summer months as well as an evacuation route for the coastal regions of Monmouth County, and the poor design of the current roadway, which lacks turning lanes and facilities for bicycles and pedestrians. In addition, a proposed outlet mall called the Jersey Shore Premium Outlets was planned along the route in Tinton Falls, with improvements planned to the route in the vicinity of the project including an overpass to the outlet mall. In 2006, Neptune Township refused to cooperate with these plans because the original agreement for the outlet mall project in 2001 was no longer up to date with the current traffic demands. Despite this opposition, the plans were approved by the borough of Tinton Falls in 2007 and the Jersey Shore Premium Outlets opened in November 2008. As for the widening of Route 66, a meeting was held in August 2009 between members of the 11th state Legislative district and the Commissioner of the New Jersey Department of Transportation.

== Major intersections ==
The entire route is in Monmouth County.

Location	mi	km	Destinations	Notes
Tinton Falls	0.00	0.00	Route 33 west – Freehold	Western terminus
Tinton Falls	0.24	0.39	G.S. Parkway	GSP exit 100
Tinton Falls	0.64	1.03	Premium Outlets Boulevard / Hovchild Boulevard	Interchange
Neptune Township	2.51	4.04	CR 16 west (Asbury Avenue)	West end of CR 16 overlap
Neptune Township	3.01	4.84	Route 18 – Eatontown, Point Pleasant	Route 18 exit 10
Neptune Township	3.62	5.83	Route 35 – Eatontown, Keyport, Neptune, Point Pleasant Beach CR 16 east (Asbury Avenue) – Asbury Park	Asbury Park Circle, eastern terminus
1.000 mi = 1.609 km; 1.000 km = 0.621 mi: Concurrency terminus
