= Naval Weapons Station Earle =

United States Navy base in New Jersey

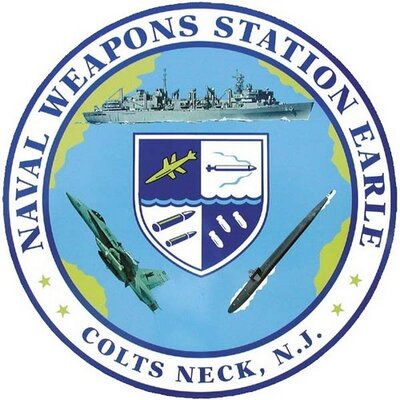
Naval Weapons Station Earle
- Monmouth County, New Jersey
- An aerial view of the greater NWS Earle facility in Monmouth County, just south of Colts Neck.

Site information
- Type: Military base
- Controlled by: United States Navy
- Condition: Operational

Location
- Location within Monmouth County, New Jersey Location within New Jersey
- Coordinates: 40°15′54″N 74°09′41″W

Site history
- In use: December 13, 1943 - Present

Garrison information
- Current commander: Captain Kent D. Smith

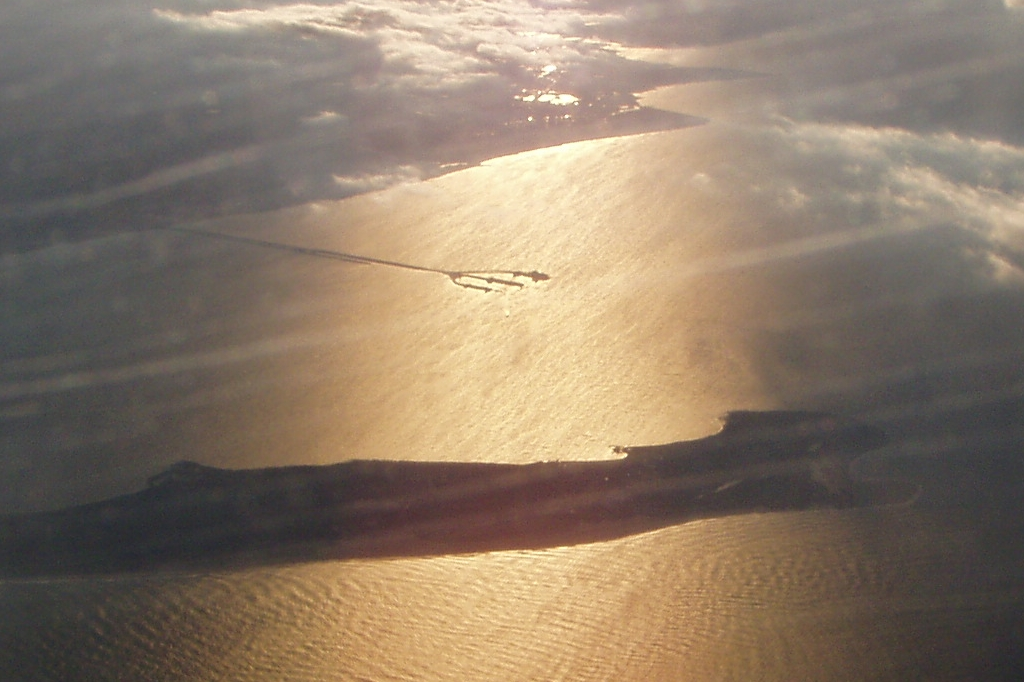
The Leonardo Piers seen from the air

Naval Weapons Station Earle, originally known as the Naval Ammunition Depot Earle, is a United States Navy base in Monmouth County, New Jersey, United States. Its distinguishing feature is a 2.1-mile (3.4 km) pier in Sandy Hook Bay where ammunition can be loaded and unloaded from warships at a safe distance from heavily populated areas.

The station is divided into two sections: Mainside, located in parts of Colts Neck, Howell, Wall Township, and Tinton Falls at 40°15′00″N 74°09′00″W; and the Waterfront Area (which includes the pier complex), on Sandy Hook Bay, located in the Leonardo section of Middletown, at 40°24′30″N 74°04′30″W. The areas are connected by Normandy Road, a 15-mile (24 km) military road and rail line that crosses and bypasses multiple public roads.

== History ==
World War II operations demanded an ammunition depot near the greater New York metropolitan area but away from high-population sectors. Planning was hastened in early 1943 after the ammunition ship SS El Estero caught fire while moored in Bayonne, New Jersey. If the stowed and dockside explosives had detonated at once, in the manner of the great Halifax Explosion, the blast could have damaged parts of Bayonne and even Lower Manhattan. A board was established to locate a suitable site, and chose Sandy Hook Bay, which featured a safe, sheltered, and nearby port where ships could take on ammunition. Rail lines could bring in the ammunition from the west, where the majority of ammunition shipments originated. The rural area meant few local residents would be affected.

On August 2, 1943, construction began on Naval Ammunition Depot Earle, named after Rear Admiral Ralph Earle, the chief of the Bureau of Ordnance during World War I. The depot was commissioned on December 13, 1943, though work continued on the military road and railway connecting the mainside complex, the waterfront complex and the pier, which stretches 2.9 miles (4.7 km) into the Sandy Hook Bay.

Earle continued to develop after World War II, keeping pace with the changing needs of the navy. In 1974, the depot's name was changed to Naval Weapons Station Earle.

School-aged children of active military personnel at the station in grades K through 8 attend the schools of the Tinton Falls School District. Since the start of the 2016–17 school year, students in grades 9 through 12 started attending Colts Neck High School, as part of a sending/receiving relationship with the Freehold Regional High School District, before which they had attended Monmouth Regional High School in Tinton Falls.

NWS Earle is also the homeport to USNS Supply (T-AOE 6), USNS Arctic (T-AOE-8), and Combat Logistics Squadron 2.

In 2015, the largest solar farm in New Jersey, the Ben Moreell Solar Farm, a 28.5 MW system on 170 acres (69 ha), was completed at the station.

== Facilities ==
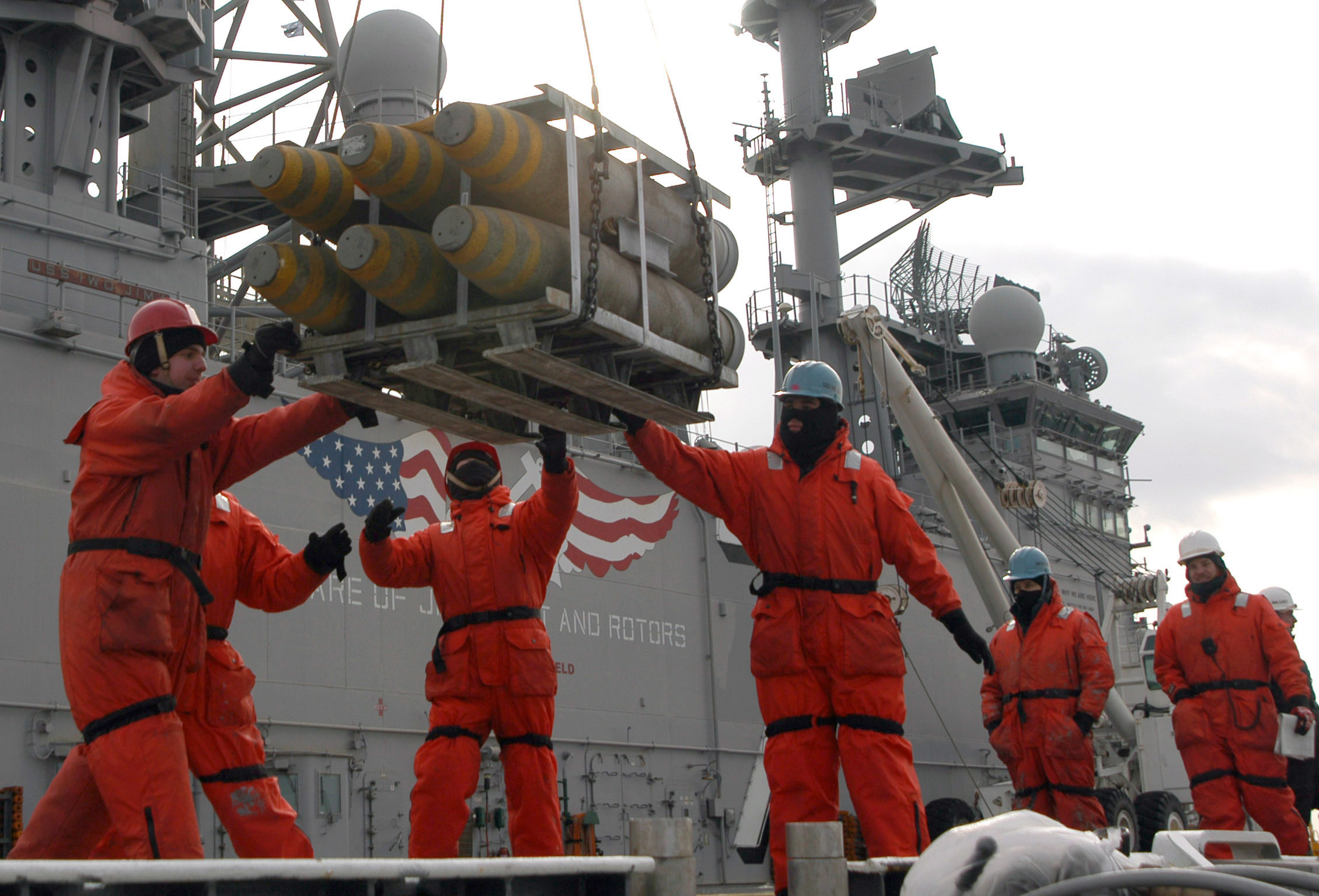
Aviation Ordnancemen inventory ordnance aboard the amphibious assault ship USS Iwo Jima (LHD-7) at Naval Weapons Station Earle.

- Mainside: The 10,000 acres (40 km^{2}) in Colts Neck house most of Earle's departments and facilities. The Navy Munitions Command, Detachment Earle, performs the station's primary mission: storing and providing ammunition to the fleet. Military and civilian personnel operate the inland storage, renovation, transshipment and demilitarization facilities.
- Waterfront: At the Waterfront Complex, the Navy Munitions Command provides ammunition for nearly every class of ship operated by the navy and United States Coast Guard as well as commercial vessels from other countries.
- Pier Complex: The station's pier complex is one of the longest "finger piers" in the world. A two-mile (3 km) trestle connects to three finger piers. One mile from the shore the trestle branches off to Pier 1. At the junction of Piers 2, 3 and 4, a concrete platform supports a forklift/battery-recharging shop and the port operations building. This area is known as the "wye."

== See also ==
- 2024 New Jersey drone sightings
- PS Alexander Hamilton
