= Old Mill at Tinton Falls =

- U.S. National Register of Historic Places
- New Jersey Register of Historic Places
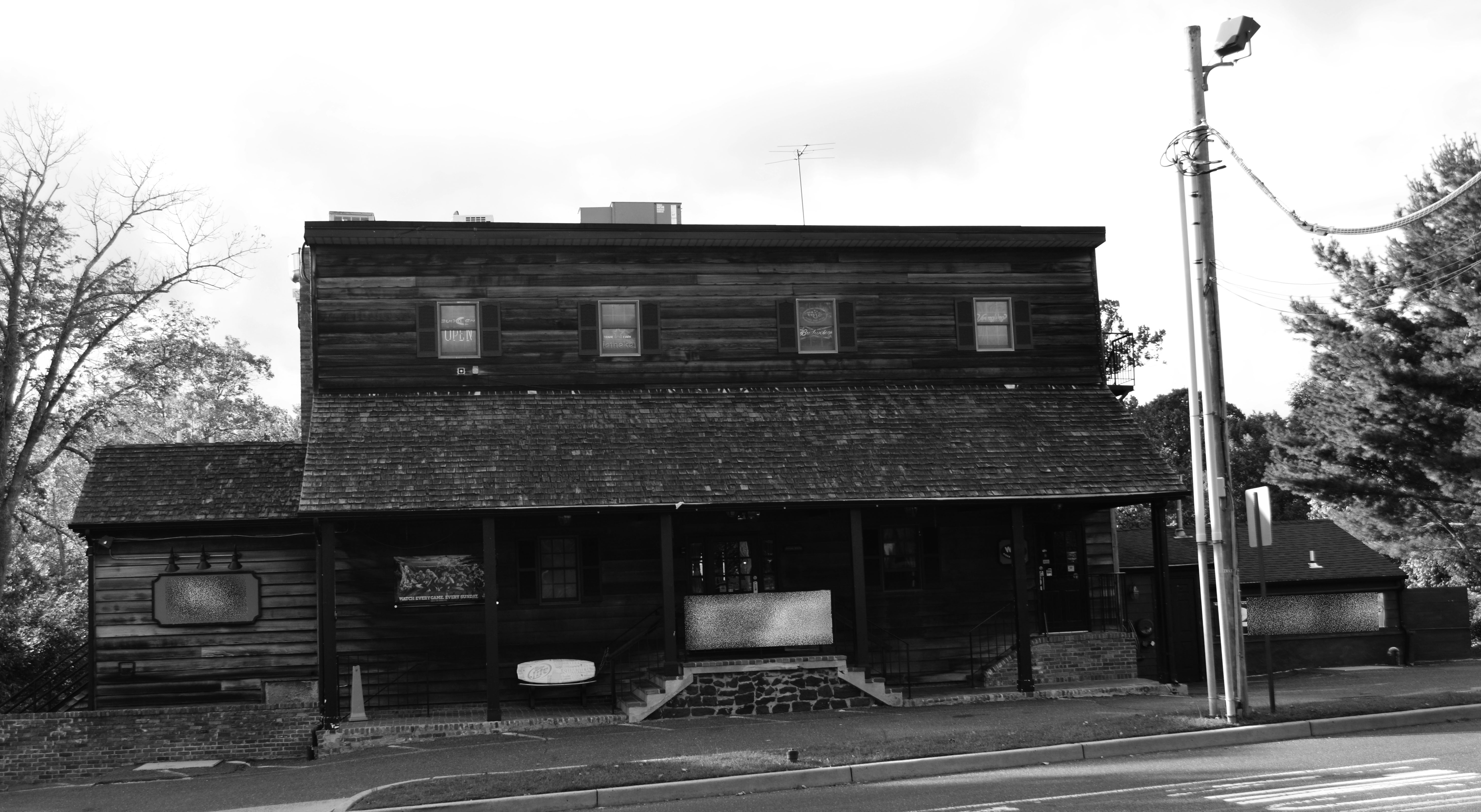

- Location within Monmouth County, New Jersey Location within New Jersey Location within the United States
- Location: 1205 Sycamore Avenue, Tinton Falls, New Jersey
- Coordinates: 40°18′16″N 74°6′3″W
- Area: 5 acres (2.0 ha)
- Built: 1676
- NRHP reference No.: 73001119
- NJRHP No.: 2061

Significant dates
- Added to NRHP: April 24, 1973
- Designated NJRHP: August 2, 1972

Old Mill at Tinton Falls is located in Tinton Falls, Monmouth County, New Jersey, United States. The mill was built in 1676 and was added to the National Register of Historic Places on April 24, 1973. As of 2023, the building is open as a restaurant with views of the adjacent Tinton Falls.

== See also ==
- List of the oldest buildings in New Jersey
- National Register of Historic Places listings in Monmouth County, New Jersey
