= Tinton Falls School District =

School district in Monmouth County, New Jersey, US

Address
- 658 Tinton Avenue Tinton Falls, Monmouth County, New Jersey, 07724; United States
- Coordinates: 40.301878°N 74.097707°W

District information
- Grades: PreK-8
- Superintendent: Lisa Goldey
- Business administrator: Vin Daniels
- Schools: 3

Students and staff
- Enrollment: 1,331 (as of 2020–21)
- Faculty: 153.4 FTEs
- Student–teacher ratio: 8.7:1

Other information
- District Factor Group: GH
- Website: www.tfschools.org
| Ind. | Per pupil | District spending | Rank (*) | K-8 average | %± vs. average |
|---|---|---|---|---|---|
| 1A | Total Spending | $18,566 | 62 | $18,891 | −1.7% |
| 1 | Budgetary Cost | 15,664 | 71 | 14,159 | 10.6% |
| 2 | Classroom Instruction | 8,877 | 54 | 8,659 | 2.5% |
| 6 | Support Services | 3,311 | 83 | 2,167 | 52.8% |
| 8 | Administrative Cost | 1,695 | 58 | 1,547 | 9.6% |
| 10 | Operations & Maintenance | 1,671 | 57 | 1,612 | 3.7% |
| 13 | Extracurricular Activities | 110 | 55 | 104 | 5.8% |
| 16 | Median Teacher Salary | 60,074 | 33 | 61,136 |
Data from NJDoE 2014 Taxpayers' Guide to Education Spending. *Of K-8 districts with more than 750 students. Lowest spending=1; Highest=84

The Tinton Falls School District is a regional elementary school district in Monmouth County, in the U.S. state of New Jersey, serving students in pre-kindergarten through eighth grades. Students from Tinton Falls are a majority of the district's enrollment, together with students from the neighboring community of Shrewsbury Township and the dependent children of military families based at Naval Weapons Station Earle.

As of the 2020–21 school year, the district, comprising three schools, had an enrollment of 1,331 students and 153.4 classroom teachers (on an FTE basis), for a student–teacher ratio of 8.7:1.

The district is classified by the New Jersey Department of Education as being in District Factor Group "GH", the third-highest of eight groupings. District Factor Groups organize districts statewide to allow comparison by common socioeconomic characteristics of the local districts. From lowest socioeconomic status to highest, the categories are A, B, CD, DE, FG, GH, I and J.

Students in public school for ninth through twelfth grades attend Monmouth Regional High School, located in Tinton Falls. The school also serves students from Eatontown and Naval Weapons Station Earle. As of the 2020–21 school year, the high school had an enrollment of 953 students and 90.2 classroom teachers (on an FTE basis), for a student–teacher ratio of 10.6:1.

Students may also apply to attend one of the magnet schools in the Monmouth County Vocational School District — Marine Academy of Science and Technology, Academy of Allied Health & Science, High Technology High School, Biotechnology High School, and Communications High School.

== Awards and recognition ==
In 2004, Mahala F. Atchison School was designated as a Governor's School of Excellence. Tinton Falls Middle School earned that designation in 2005. Additionally all three schools have won numerous Best Practices awards.

== Schools ==
Schools in the district (with 2020–21 enrollment data from the National Center for Education Statistics) are:

Elementary schools

- Mahala F. Atchison Elementary School with 438 students in grades K-3
  - Jessica Black, principal
- Swimming River Elementary School with 440 students in grades 4-5
  - Benjamin Howroyd, principal

Middle school

- Tinton Falls Middle School with 446 students in grades 6-8
  - Carrianne Kaplan, principal

== Administration ==
Core members of the district's administration are:

- Lisa Goldey, superintendent
- Vin Daniels, business administrator and board secretary

== Board of education ==
The district's board of education, comprised of nine members, sets policy and oversees the fiscal and educational operation of the district through its administration. As a Type II school district, the board's trustees are elected directly by voters to serve three-year terms of office on a staggered basis, with three seats up for election each year held (since 2012) as part of the November general election. The board appoints a superintendent to oversee the district's day-to-day operations and a business administrator to supervise the business functions of the district. Seats on the school board are allocated based on the populations of the two constituent municipalities, with eight allocated to Tinton Falls and one to Shrewsbury Township.
