= Ernabel Demillo =

American television journalist

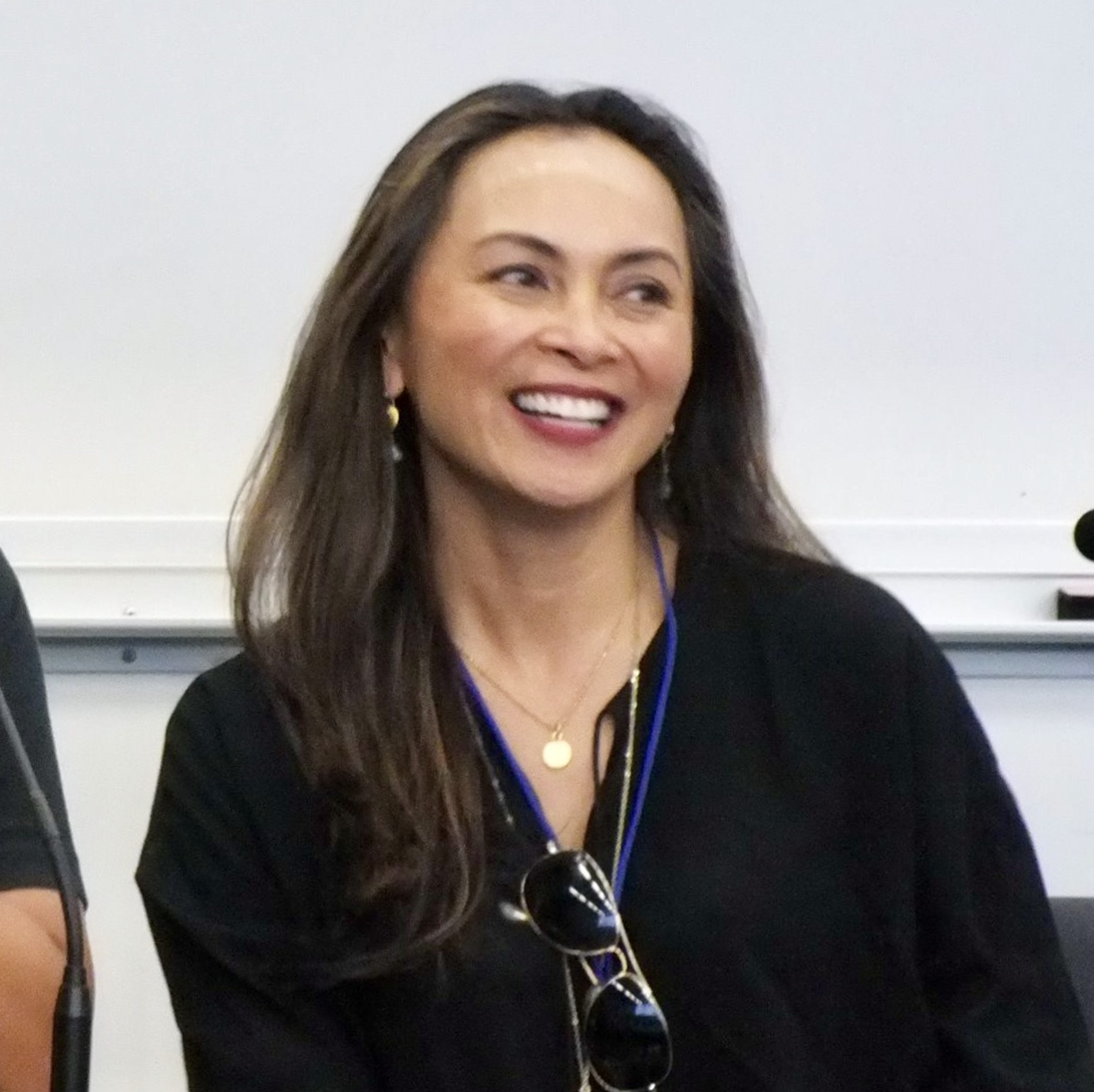
- Demillo speaking at Filipino American National Historical Society Conference in New York, June 2016
- Born: Manila, Philippines
- Education: Northwestern University (MS) University of Southern California (BA)
- Occupations: Journalist and journalism educator
- Partner: John Muller
- Children: 1 daughter
- Awards: Inaugural recipient of the Frank LoMonte Ethics in Journalism Award

Ernabel Castro Demillo is an American television journalist and journalism educator. She is the host and producer of CUNY TV's monthly magazine show, "Asian American Life", which debuted in 2013. She is also a tenured Journalism professor at Saint Peter's University and serves as the Department of Communication and Media Culture's faculty chair.

== Early life ==
Demillo was born in Manila, Philippines.

== Education ==
She received her M.S. in Journalism from Northwestern University's Medill School of Journalism and her B.A. in journalism and international relations from the University of Southern California.

== Career ==
"Asian American Life" has been nominated for multiple Emmys since its debut and honored with four Telly Awards. The premiere show was nominated for a NY News Emmy for Best Community Affairs/Public Programming in 2014. Her short documentary featured on Asian American Life in 2019, "Fighting Hunger, Feeding Minds: A New Yorker's Mission to Keep Kids in School in Rural Philippines" won a 2021 Emmy. Demillo was also nominated for a New York Emmy for Best Historical/Cultural Segment for Asian American Life in 2017 for her feature "The Ties that Bind: Filipinos in New York".

In 2017, she was the inaugural recipient of the Frank LoMonte Ethics in Journalism Award, which is given to someone who performs "in an outstanding ethical manner demonstrating the ideals of CMA's Code of Ethical Behavior." Demillo was honored for fighting against her employer Saint Peter's University when they attempted to censor the Pauw Wow the student-run newspaper she advised.

Since 2011 she has also worked for CUNY-TV's Emmy-nominated science magazine show, "Science and U". Her segment on Bash the Trash, an eco-friendly musical group, was nominated for a New York Emmy in 2013 for Best Environment Program. Demillo has also worked as a news reader for Court-TV and reporter for MSNBC.

From 1996 to 2005 she was a reporter and fill-anchor for FOX-5 New York's morning show, Good Day New York. Prior to her move to New York, Demillo was a reporter for the CBS affiliate, KOVR-13 News in Sacramento, California, and a reporter for the now shuttered Orange County News Channel in Orange County, California.

Demillo is also chair of the Department of Communication and Media Culture at Saint Peter's University in Jersey City, New Jersey. She started the journalism minor in 2008 and currently teaches courses in journalism and communication.

Demillo, along with Slice of Culture, a local news site, received a multi-year grant from the New Jersey Civic Information Consortium (NJCIC) to address news gaps in underserved local communities in New Jersey.

== Personal life ==
She is in a relationship and has a child with former ABC Newscaster and now WPIX news anchor John Muller, and resides in Tinton Falls, New Jersey.

== See also ==
- Filipinos in the New York metropolitan area
- New Yorkers in journalism
