= Seaview Square Mall =

Coordinates: 40.232°N 74.045°W

Seaview Square Shopping Center
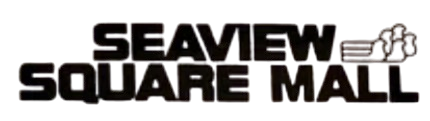

- Aerial view of the Seaview Square Mall on March 29, 1995
- Location: Ocean Township, New Jersey, United States
- Address: 1000 Route 66
- Opened: November 2, 1977
- Closed: December 31, 2000 (original mall)
- Developer: Goodman Company
- Num. of anchor tenants: 3
- Floor area: 929,620 square feet (86,365 m^{2})
- Floors: 2
- Public transit: NJ Transit bus: 832, 837

Seaview Square Mall was a shopping mall located in Ocean Township, in Monmouth County, New Jersey, United States. It has been repurposed as a power center and was renamed Seaview Square Shopping Center in 2012. The 856,000-square-foot (79,500 m^{2}) mall, located at the intersection of Route 35 and Route 66, was originally constructed in 1977 as an indoor mall. It faced stiff competition from the more upscale Monmouth Mall, located five miles (8 km) further north on Route 35 in Eatontown. One of its four anchors never opened, and several smaller stores, and Stern's and Steinbach, two of its anchors, were victims of the then-indoor mall's then-state of decline. The mall was later redeveloped into a shopping center with Target, Costco, Burlington, Home Sense, Siera Trading, Marshalls, Home Goods, Petsmart, Starbucks, and others.

== History ==
The mall's past history can be traced back to the 1950s, when Sears relocated its Downtown Asbury Park store to a more suburban site on Route 66 at the site of the present-day Neptune World Class Shoprite, just west of the Asbury Circle.

Following the 1970 Asbury Park riots, many businesses left Asbury Park's Downtown. Thus, planning for Seaview Square began at the site across the street from the Sears, behind a small cinema, which was later renamed the "Seaview Square Cinema" and absorbed as part of the mall's property. The site was originally a landfill from 1941 to 1975 and was considered a Superfund site by the United States Environmental Protection Agency (EPA) until 1991. The 856,000-square-foot (79,500 m^{2}) mall would be anchored by Steinbach at the west end, and a newer and much larger Sears at the other end, which also housed Sears' regional credit office. The mall also had room for about 150 stores and two extra anchors.

The mall was developed by The Goodman Company and opened on November 2, 1977. At this point, the mall was about 40% occupied. Steinbach operated its Seaview Square store as an upscale, fashion-oriented store, and their Asbury Park store more towards housewares and furniture. By 1979, however, the Asbury Park store had closed and the company reevaluated itself as a "value chain". In the same year, Stern's opened along the front side of the mall, after it wasn't able to open at the nearby Ocean County Mall in Toms River. Around the same time, Lord & Taylor was rumored to be the mall's fourth anchor, but never came to fruition.

In the 1990s, Stern's parent company, Federated Department Stores, bought Macy's, and decided to merge the Abraham & Straus chain into Macy's, which left the Monmouth Mall with an empty anchor. Sterns subsequently moved to the vacant space, but continued to operate the Seaview Square store as half-store and half-clearance center until their lease ran out in 1999. Steinbach folded that same year and was replaced with a Value City.

== Redevelopment ==
The mall closed on December 31, 2000 (with RadioShack, an original mall tenant, being the final store to close), for reconstruction, and most of the original indoor mall was demolished in 2001, with the exception of its remaining two anchors, Value City and Sears.

In September 2012, Wharton Realty Group purchased the mall and renamed it the Seaview Square Shopping Center. New construction on the Route 66 entrance to the mall created three new restaurants and additional retail stores. A wave of new tenants soon filled most of the empty space of the old mall including Guitar Center, A.C. Moore, Big Lots, Burlington Coat Factory, Sky Zone Indoor Trampoline Park, Costco, PetSmart and a Target among others.

Value City had since went out of business in 2008 and was demolished in 2016. Today, the space is occupied by Homesense and Sierra Trading Post.

On May 31, 2018, Sears announced plans to close the store in September, as part of a plan to close 63 stores nationwide. Sears was the last of the original anchors to close. An At Home and an Amazon warehouse have since replaced levels 1 & 2 of Sears, respectively.

On November 25, 2019, A.C. Moore announced the it would close 145 stores, including the one at Seaview.

In 2019 Wharton announced an additional expansion to include Marshalls and HomeGoods bringing the center's occupancy to over 98%. In October 2020, the Marshalls and Home Goods opened.

In January 2022, the first Crumbl Cookies in New Jersey opened in a building fronting Route 66.

In 2023, Dave's Hot Chicken opened its second location in New Jersey.

In April 2024, Norman's Hallmark announced a location to open at Seaview.

In June 2025, At Home announced it was closing 30 stores by September 2025, including the one at Seaview.

In September 2025, PGA Tour Superstore announced it was opening a location in the site of the former Big Lots.
