= John Muller =

American television journalist

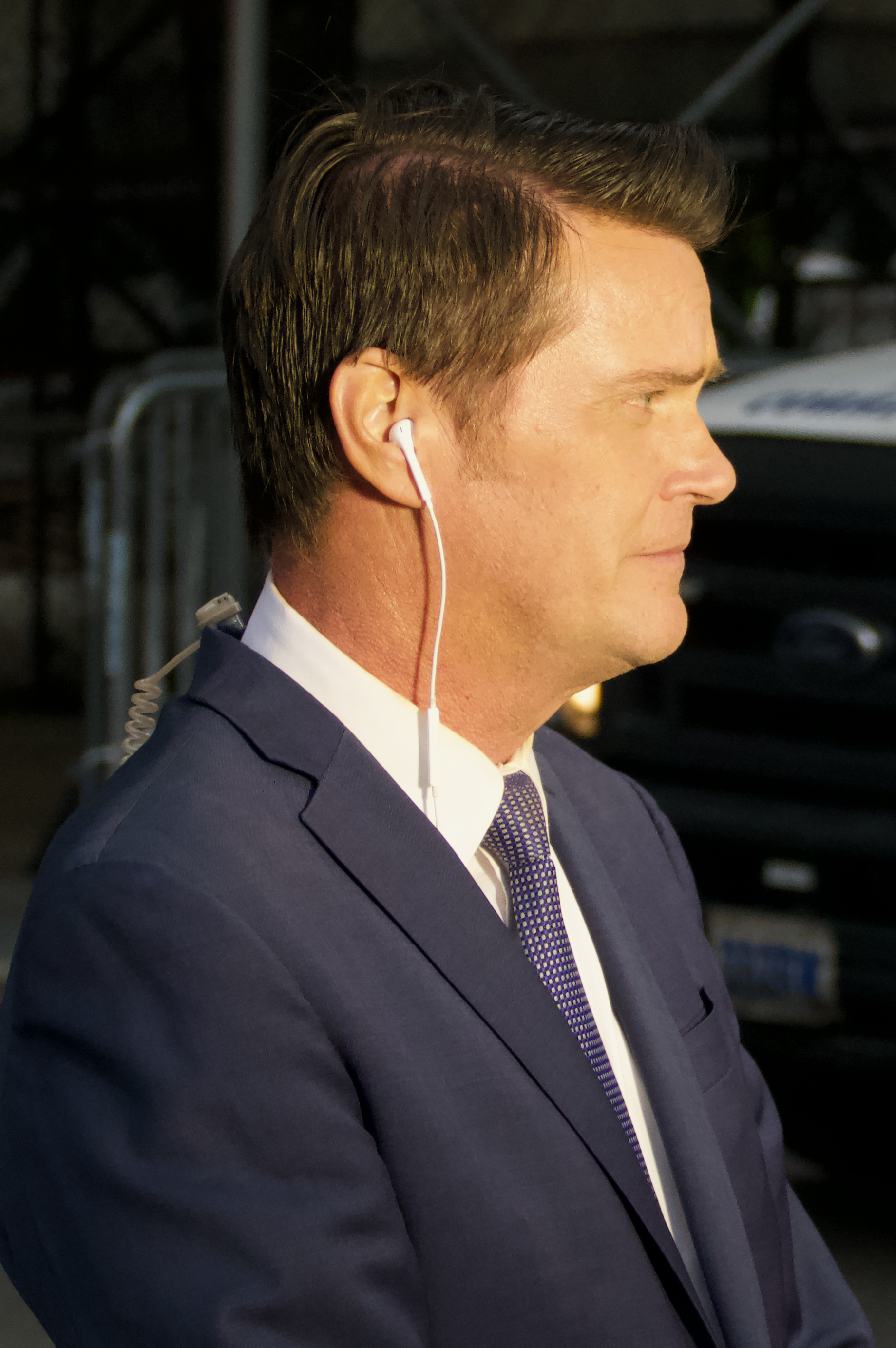
- Muller in 2024
- Born: July 7, 1966 (age 60); Queens, New York, U.S.
- Education: New York University
- Occupation: Television journalist
- Years active: 1999–present
- Partner: Ernabel Demillo
- Children: One daughter

John William Muller (born July 7, 1966) is an American television journalist. He is the weeknight anchor of PIX11's Emmy Award-winning PIX11 News in New York City. He previously worked as a reporter and anchor in Georgia and Florida, and was with ABC News from 2011 to 2014, where his anchor duties included World News Now and ABC News Now.

== Early life ==
Muller was born in Queens, New York and raised on Long Island, the middle child of seven siblings. He attended Catholic schools. He received a scholarship to New York University where he majored in journalism and mass communication and minored in history. His first exposure to professional journalism came through internships with WNCY-TV, ABC News, CBS News and WNBC-TV.

== Career ==
=== Georgia and Florida ===
Muller began his television career at WTOC-TV, the CBS affiliate in Savannah, Georgia. After two years he accepted a reporter position at WBBH-TV, the NBC affiliate in Fort Myers, Florida, where he won the Associated Press's "Best Individual Achievement Award" for all-round excellence in the state of Florida. Among his work was coverage of hurricanes including Hurricane Andrew. He was promoted to the weekend anchor desk, his first permanent anchor position.

After three years in Fort Myers, Muller moved to WFLA-TV, the NBC affiliate in Tampa, Florida. Muller spent three years at WFLA as the lead reporter on the 11 p.m. news. In Tampa, he won the Associated Press award for "Best Spot News Reporting".

=== New York City ===
He joined WNBC-TV in New York City, where he reported for the Today in New York show. He also filled-in on the weekend anchor desk and anchored WNBC's initial coverage of the death of Princess Diana.

He was selected to anchor and host the WB11 Morning News, which debuted in June 2000. The show received an Emmy Award for Best Morning News Show. He also served as sports anchor for the broadcast as well as the anchor/reporter/producer of daily business news segments branded "It's Your Money". Muller joined ABC News in 2011. He was an anchor and correspondent, based at ABC's world headquarters in New York City, covering stories of national and international interest. In 2014, Muller returned to WPIX to anchor weeknights at 5 and 10 p.m., alongside Tamsen Fadal. On July 20, 2020, he returned to PIX11 as anchor of the 4:30-7am hours of the PIX11 Morning News with Vanessa Freeman.

== Personal life ==
He resides in Tinton Falls, New Jersey. He and his longtime partner and fellow journalist Ernabel Demillo have a daughter.

== See also ==
- List of New York University alumni
- List of television reporters
