= Red Bank station =

NJ Transit rail station

Red Bank
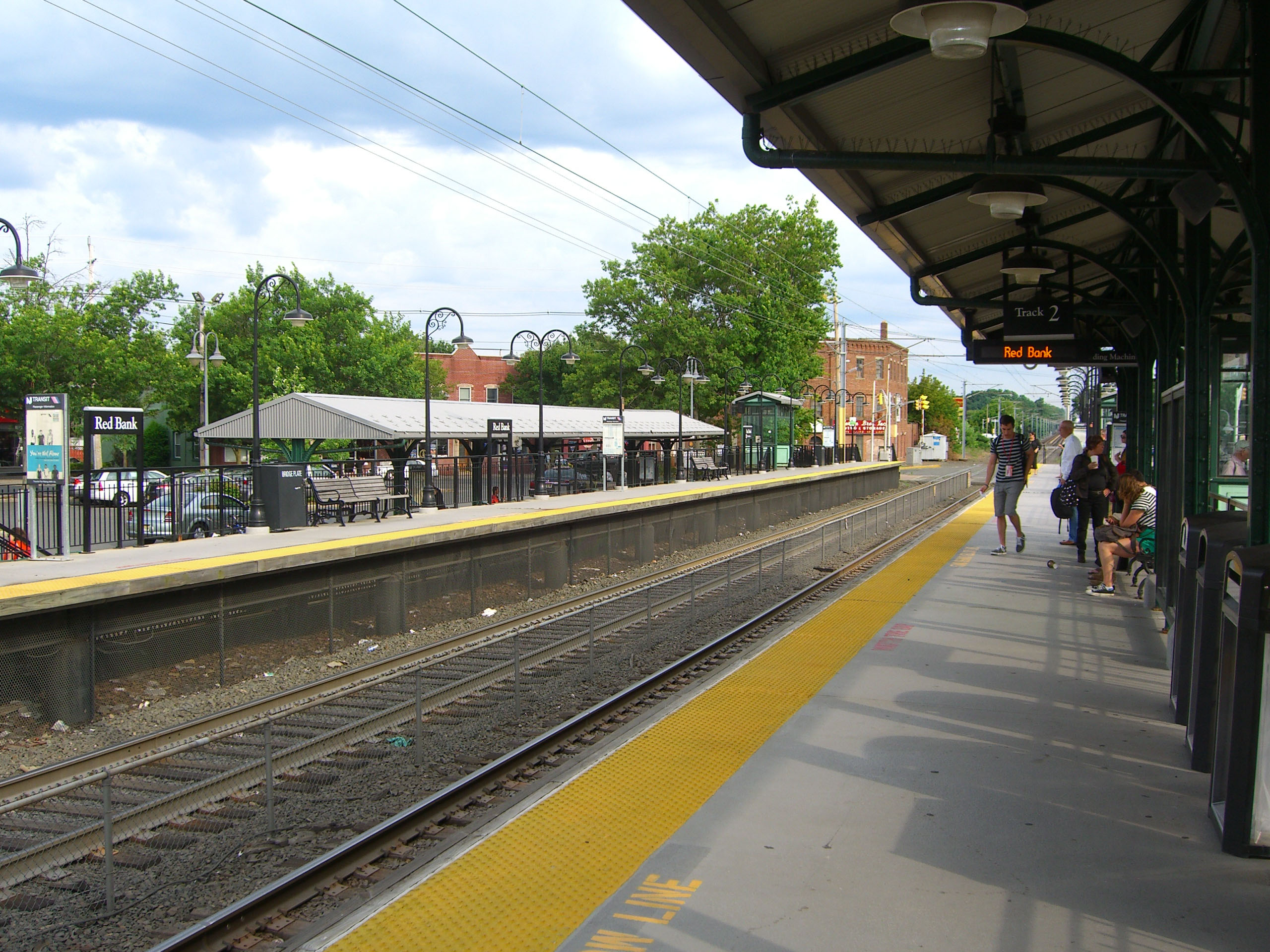
- Red Bank station platforms in New Jersey

General information
- Location: 175 Monmouth Street; Red Bank, NJ 07701
- Owner: NJ Transit
- Line: North Jersey Coast Line
- Platforms: 2 side platforms
- Tracks: 2
- Connections: NJT Bus: 831, 832, 834, and 838; Academy Bus: Shore Points

Construction
- Parking: Yes
- Cycle facilities: Yes
- Accessible: Yes

Other information
- Fare zone: 18

History
- Opened: June 25, 1875 (ceremonial); July 1, 1875 (regular service)
- Rebuilt: 2005–2006
- Electrified: 25 kV 60 Hz

Passengers
- 2025: 675 (average weekday)
- Rank: 42 of 153

Services
Preceding station	NJ Transit	Following station
Little Silver toward Bay Head	North Jersey Coast Line	Middletown toward New York
Former services
Preceding station	New York and Long Branch Railroad	Following station
Little Silver toward Bay Head Junction	Main Line	Middletown toward Perth Amboy
Preceding station	Central Railroad of New Jersey	Following station
Shrewsbury toward Bridgeton	Southern Division	Terminus
- Red Bank Passenger Station
- U.S. National Register of Historic Places
- New Jersey Register of Historic Places
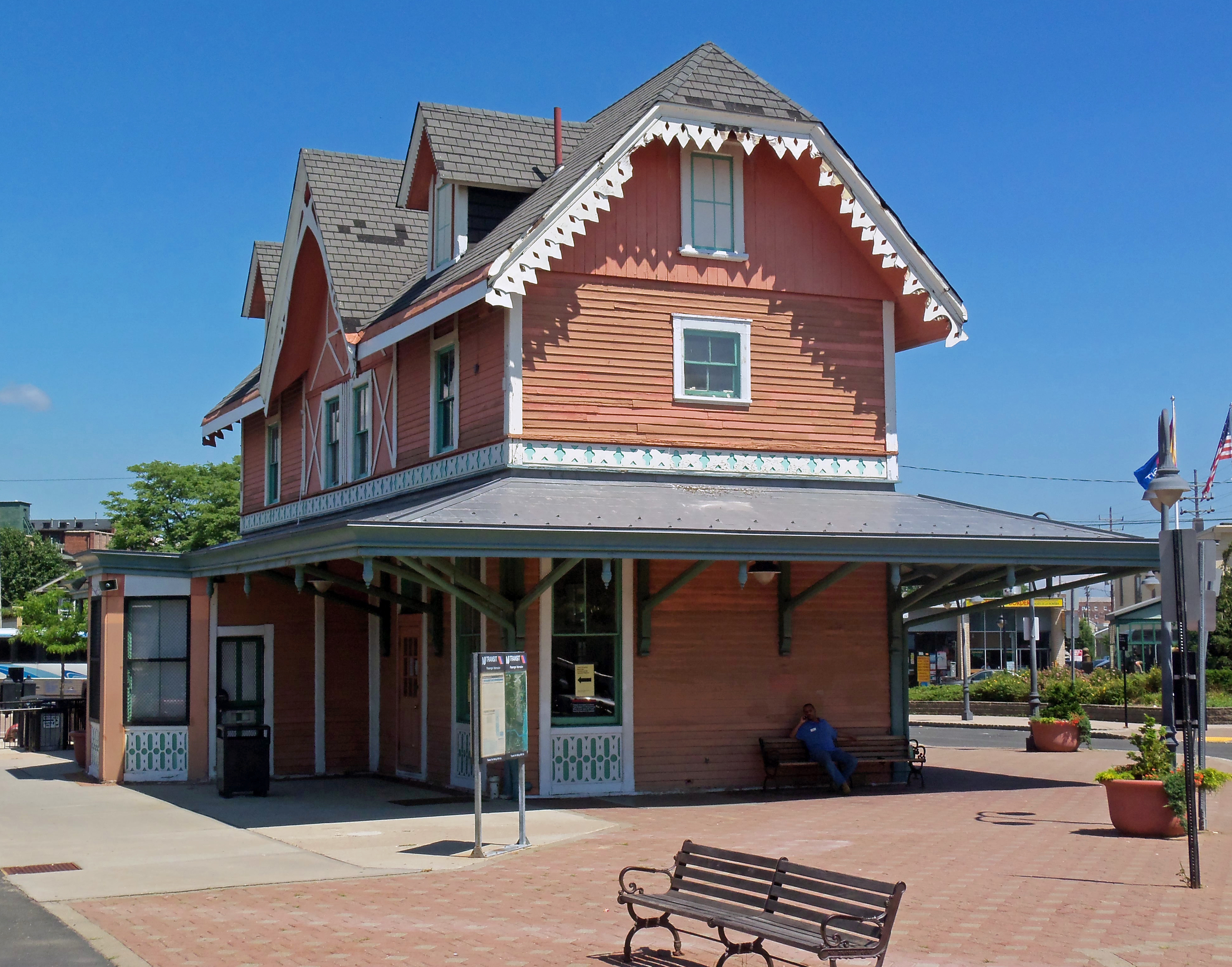
- The Central Railroad of New Jersey depot at Red Bank.
- Interactive map of Red Bank Passenger Station
- Location: Bridge Ave. and Monmouth St., Red Bank, NJ 07701
- Coordinates: 40°20′54.12″N 74°4′27.83″W
- Area: 2 acres (0.8 ha)
- Built: 1876
- Architectural style: Gothic
- MPS: Operating Passenger Railroad Stations TR
- NRHP reference No.: 76001172
- NJRHP No.: 2048

Significant dates
- Added to NRHP: May 28, 1976
- Designated NJRHP: January 7, 1976
Location

Red Bank is a commuter train station located in Red Bank, Monmouth County, New Jersey, United States. It is one of 20 NJ Transit commuter rail stations on the North Jersey Coast Line. It is located on Bridge Avenue between Monmouth and Oakland streets, just south of the Navesink River, and consists of two high-level platforms on either side of grade crossings.

== History ==
Red Bank station was built by Central Railroad of New Jersey in 1875, has been on the National Register of Historic Places since 1976 and is part of the Operating Passenger Railroad Stations Thematic Resource. Notable visitors included Presidents Ulysses S. Grant, Theodore Roosevelt, Franklin D. Roosevelt, and King George VI of the United Kingdom. The 1876 station house was renovated in 2012–2014 to its appearance when built, including historically correct material, reconstruction of "Yankee" gutters, installation of new downspouts, and replacement of historic windows, shutters and gingerbread trim. Repairs were made to roof soffits and wood framing of the structure, and to repoint the brick foundation wall and the brick chimney, and to recreate a brick "crown" atop the chimney. Exterior paint of the station matches its original color scheme.

== Station layout ==
The station has two high-level side platforms that are eight cars long.

== See also ==
- List of New Jersey Transit stations
- National Register of Historic Places listings in Monmouth County, New Jersey
