= Jersey Shore Premium Outlets =

Shopping center in Monmouth County

- Aerial view (November 2025)
- Location: Tinton Falls, New Jersey, U.S.
- Opened: November 13, 2008; 18 years ago
- Developer: Chelsea Property Group
- Manager: Simon Premium Outlets
- Owner: Simon Property Group
- Num. of stores: 120+ (at peak)
- Floor area: 435,000 square feet (40,000 m^{2})
- Website: Official website

Jersey Shore Premium Outlets is an open-air outlet mall in the borough of Tinton Falls in Monmouth County, New Jersey, United States. Operated by Simon Property Group through its Premium Outlets division, the open‑air complex encompasses about 435,000 square feet (40,400 m^{2}) of gross leasable space. It was marketed as Simon's third and largest Premium Outlet in New Jersey. The center is situated off exit 100A off the Garden State Parkway along Route 66.

== History ==
=== 2007–2008: Development and opening ===
Chelsea Property Group, a subsidiary of Simon Property Group after they acquired it in October 2004, announced plans for an open-air mall in the Tinton Falls area in 2007. Jersey Shore Premium Outlets was proposed as a 435,000-square-foot (40,400 m^{2}) outlet center, with construction costs projected at about $157 million and an anticipated 12% return on investment.

Local officials touted the project's economic benefits. A Monmouth County press release issued ahead of the opening described the outlet mall as a $150 million investment that would provide about 430,000 square feet of high‑end retail space and had already created roughly 800 jobs. County officials predicted that the center would generate tax revenue, attract bus tours to the Jersey Shore and stimulate tourism and local spending.

A top-down view of the outlets in November 2025.

Jersey Shore Premium Outlets opened to the public on November 13, 2008. The mall opened with roughly 120 tenants in operation and approximately 435,000 square feet (40,400 square meters) of gross leasable area, and that the new outlets in Tinton Falls and Houston were well‑leased and expected to deliver a 13% return on investment.

=== After opening ===
NJBIZ characterized the opening as significant to the state's outlet industry, calling Jersey Shore Premium Outlets the third and largest Premium Outlet in New Jersey and reporting that it created more than 800 jobs. Retail Value News ranked the center as the second‑largest outlet mall in New Jersey after The Walk in Atlantic City.

In January 2019, Simon announced a major solar energy initiative at Jersey Shore Premium Outlets. Working with Safari Energy, the company planned to install nearly 700 additional solar panels on the mall's roofs to augment an existing 1,300‑panel array installed in 2012. The combined system was expected to generate more than 302,000 kilowatt‑hours of electricity annually and reduce the center’s energy costs and carbon footprint by at least 55%. General manager Janet Porter said the project demonstrated Simon’s commitment to renewable energy and innovation.

In March 2023, several retailers were joining the outlet center. Marketing director Michele Baboomian said leasing demand remained strong and that customers valued the ability to "touch, feel and try on products before they buy." Windsor Fashion had opened near the Gap Factory Store. Lovisa planned to open in mid‑April. Under Armour Factory House would relocate to a larger space in May. VellaPais was scheduled to open in May, and Spencer's Gifts was slated to open in July.

== See also ==
- Jackson Premium Outlets
- Woodbury Common Premium Outlets
