= Tomaini =

Tomaini is a surname. Notable people with the surname include:

- Al Tomaini (1912–1962), American circus performer, once the world's tallest person
- Army Tomaini (1918–2005), American football player, brother of Johnny
- Johnny Tomaini (1902–1985), American football player
