= Kid's World (amusement park) =

Amusement park in Long Branch, New Jersey, United States

- Interactive map of Kid's World
- Location: 50 Chelsea Avenue, Long Branch, New Jersey, United States
- Coordinates: 40.30247°N 73.97949°W
- Status: Defunct
- Opened: 1985
- Closed: 1987

Attractions
- Total: 9
- Roller coasters: 1
- Water rides: 2

Kid's World was an amusement park along the boardwalk on Ocean Avenue in Long Branch, New Jersey, United States.

== History ==
In 1985, six years after developers Pat Cicalese (owner of the Chelsea Pool and the Mile a Minute Waterslide) and his business partner Carmen Ricci purchased the Long Branch Pier across the street that they had been leasing since the year prior to the purchase, Cicalese rethemed the pier, the pool, the Bumper Boats, and the waterslide as Kid's World, inspired by Sesame Place in Langhorne, Pennsylvania (Cicalese purchased Ricci's half of the business in 1980).

Many of the rides from years past had been replaced by this time by new rides, but the park still drew adults. The famous Haunted Mansion that started the revamp of the pier in 1978 remained as part of Kid's World. Kid's World also featured an attraction based on the popular children's program Romper Room. The park was heavily advertised on TVO in New York and New Jersey. The previous advertisements for the pier were mostly geared towards the Haunted Mansion, but when the Kid's World concept was introduced, the advertisements were toned down to something more family friendly. The park's mascot was Sandy the Sea Lion, who was featured in the park's logo and on animated commercials.

=== Fire and closure ===
On June 8, 1987, at around 3 pm, a fire broke out at the McDonald's at the end of the pier. The fire quickly spread throughout the pier, despite efforts by the Long Branch Fire Department to save it. After the fire, all that remained of Kid's World were the water attractions across the street from the pier. However, after the fire, business had slowed down, so the rest of Kid's World closed down for good at the end of that summer.

Cicalese had planned to rebuild the pier. However, his insurance didn't cover the cost to rebuild what was destroyed, and the town would not fund the project, so the plans were abandoned. What was left of Kid's World remained abandoned for 17 years after the fire.

What was left of the pier had deteriorated over the years, and it was demolished in 2001. The rest of Kid's World across the street was demolished in 2002.

=== Today ===
The site of Kid's World is now occupied by Pier Village, a retail/dining/condo complex. The redevelopment has revived the booming business that was once enjoyed by Kid's World. A new pier is being planned for the Long Branch waterfront, but it is not known whether the amusements will return as part of the new pier.

=== TV advertisement jingle ===
The franchise also had a jingle for advertisements with a man and kids singing the jingle.

Man: It's a Kid's World that surrounds you; it's happening all around you.
The fun that makes the magic moments, every face tells a story.
Kids and Man: Dizzy dizzy spins! Jumping out, popping in!
Riding down, climbing high! It all begins at the neatest kids' place in the whole, wide world!
Share the magic moments at... Kid's World!

(or otherwise after special event is announced by announcer) they repeat:

Share the magic moments at... Kid's World!

== Rides and attractions ==
- Water park – The park had its own waterpark which consisted of water slides, a wading pool, and obstacles.
- Bumper Boats
- Giant Slide
- Haunted Mansion
- Romper Room – As mentioned, there was an attraction based on the famous children's TV show. This attraction had a play area for young children. Mr. Do-bee, one of the characters in Romper Room also made appearances to the guests.
- Wave Swinger
- CityJet – a roller coaster inside the park
- Motorcycle Ride
- Skooters – a bumper cars ride
- Cinema 180 – a stand up movie that featured fast-paced action on a 180 degree screen. (Note: this ride was closed when Kid's World opened)
- Rock N' Roll

The park also featured snack stands and games.
