= Gerri Mattson =

American pediatrician and public health official

Gerri Mattson MSPH, FAAP
- Born: August 7, 1967 (age 59); Long Branch, New Jersey, U.S.
- Education: Medical College of Virginia (MD), UNC Gillings School of Global Public Health (MSPH)
- Occupations: Pediatrician, Public Health Official
- Years active: 1996–present
- Employer(s): North Carolina Department of Health and Human Services
- Organization: Wake County Health Department
- Known for: Leadership in AAP, APHA, NC Medical Society
- Title: Early Intervention Medical Director
- Website: UNC Professor Page

Gerri Mattson (born August 7, 1967) is an American pediatrician and the Early Intervention Medical Director at the North Carolina Department of Health and Human Services (NC DHHS) Division of Child and Family Well-Being. She is also an Adjunct Associate Professor at UNC Gillings School of Global Public Health. Mattson is board-certified in pediatrics with over 25 years of clinical experience and a Fellow of the American Academy of Pediatrics (FAAP). She is the chair-elect for the American Academy of Pediatrics’ Council on Community Pediatrics Executive Committee. She is an active participant in the North Carolina chapters of the American Public Health Association, American Academy of Pediatrics, and American Medical Association.

== Education ==
Born and raised in Long Branch, New Jersey, she graduated from Long Branch High School in 1985.

Mattson earned her Doctor of Medicine (MD) from Medical College of Virginia in 1993. She completed her residency at Emory University School of Medicine between 1993 and 1996.

In 2004, she obtained a Masters of Science in Public Health (MSPH) with a focus in Maternal and Child Health from the UNC Gillings School of Global Public Health.

== Career ==
Her career has included work in public health, pediatrics, academic work and public outreach.

=== North Carolina Department of Health and Human Services ===
Mattson joined NC DHHS in 2005 as the State Pediatric Medical Consultant within the Division of Public Health.

In 2021, she served as the Interim NC Title V CYSHCN State Director.

In 2022, she was promoted to Senior Medical Director in the Division of Child and Family Well-Being. Her responsibilities expanded to include oversight of multidisciplinary programs such as the Early Intervention Program (Part C) and DCFW disaster preparedness with and response with NCDHS and increased collaboration with the Special Supplemental Nutrition Program for Women, Infants and Children, and the Supplemental Nutrition Assistance Program (SNAP).

In 2025, she became the Early Intervention Medical Director and part of the NC Infant Toddler Program. She is in the process of creating a state medical team to support Children’s Developmental Services Agencies across the state.

=== Academic roles ===
Mattson has been an Adjunct Associate Professor in the Department of Maternal and Child Health at the UNC Gillings School of Global Public Health since 2008. She was previously Adjunct Faculty at Columbia University Mailman School of Public Health. She also briefly served as Adjunct Professor at University of North Carolina at Charlotte as a Clinical Expert for their Doctor of Nursing Practice program.

=== Clinical roles ===
Mattson is ABMS certified by the American Board of Pediatrics and has been licensed to practice in multiple states. She volunteers to provide pediatric care at a child health clinic operated by Wake County’s Health and Human Services. Over her career, she has practiced in a variety of settings, including the Indian Health Service in New Mexico, private practices, military bases, and other county health departments in North Carolina.

=== Media and public outreach ===
Mattson has appeared in news articles, educational content, and been interviewed on the radio.

== Leadership and advisory roles ==
- American Academy of Pediatrics, Council on Community Pediatrics (COCP): Executive Committee Member (2020–present) and current Chair-Elect; contributor to national policies and reports
- North Carolina Medical Society Foundation Board of Trustees, President (2018-2021)
- American Academy of Pediatrics Committee on Psychosocial Aspects of Child and Family Health: Appointed Member (2012–2018); contributor to national policies and reports
- American Public Health Association, Maternal and Child Health Section: Governing Councilor (2020–2022): review of policy and governance
- North Carolina Public Health Association (NCPHA), Women’s and Children’s Health Section: Chair (2012–2023)
- North Carolina Medical Society (NCMS): Co-Chair, Ethics and Judicial Affairs Committee (2021–2024): focused on policy review and development
- North Carolina Medical Society Leadership College: Co-Chair and faculty for physician/PA leadership development (c. 2013–2024)
- AAP STAR Center Technical Assistance Advisory Committee: Member; focused on pediatric screening tools and behavioral health integration (2016–2022)
- AAP Practical Playbook National Advisory Committee: Member, advising on multisector partnerships in population health (2018–2020)

== Awards and honors ==
- 2022: Effective Practice Award, Maternal and Child Health Section, American Public Health Association
- 2022: Governor’s Award for Excellence (North Carolina Department of Health and Human Services)
- 2019: Distinguished Service Award, North Carolina Public Health Association
- 2018: President’s Community Service Award
- 2018: Wake County One Award, Wake County Health Department, Child Health Clinic
- 2018: David J. Tayloe Sr Community Services Award in Pediatrics, North Carolina Pediatric Society
- 2018: Centers for Disease Control and Prevention Childhood Immunization Champion Award, North Carolina
- 2012: Award for Outstanding Service, North Carolina Pediatric Society
- 2012: Delta Omega Public Health Honor Society, UNC Gillings School of Global Public Health
- 2009: Women’s and Children’s Excellence Award, Women’s and Children’s Health Section, North Carolina Public Health Association
- 1993: Alpha Omega Alpha Medical Honor Society, Medical College of Virginia

== Selected publications ==
Mattson has an H-index of 21 with over 7300 citations. She has also written chapters in several books.

A few of her authored texts include:

- Mattson GL, Kuo DZ; Committee on Psychosocial Aspects of Child and Family Health; Council on Children with Disabilities. “Psychosocial risk and protective factors in children and youth with special health care needs and their families.” Pediatrics. 2019;143(1):e20183171. doi:10.1542/peds.2018‑3171
- Earls M, Yogman M, Mattson G, Rafferty J; Committee on Psychosocial Aspects of Child and Family Health. Policy statement: “Incorporating recognition and management of perinatal depression and postpartum depression into pediatric practice.” Pediatrics. 2019;143(1):e20183259. doi:10.1542/peds.2018‑3259
- Bruener C, Mattson G; Committee on Psychosocial Aspects of Child and Family Health; Committee on Adolescent Medicine. “Sexuality education for children and adolescents.” Pediatrics. 2016;138(2):e20161348. doi:10.1542/peds.2016‑1348
- Mattson GL. “How Does the Affordable Care Act Support Children at Risk For or With Diabetes?” North Carolina Medical Journal. 2011;72(5):379–382.
- Mattson G. “Sidebar: A Rare Indication: Immunization Exemptions in North Carolina.” North Carolina Medical Journal. 2021;82(2):135–136.
- Remley R, Mattson G. “Shaping the next generation of providers.” In: Michener JL, Castrucci BC, Bradley DW, Hunter EL, Thomas CW, Patterson C, Corcoran E, editors. The Practical Playbook II: Building Multisector Partnerships That Work. New York: Oxford University Press; 2019. pp. 457–464.

== Personal life ==
She has a son studying physics.
