= Elberon, New Jersey =

Place in Monmouth County, New Jersey, United States

- Unincorporated community
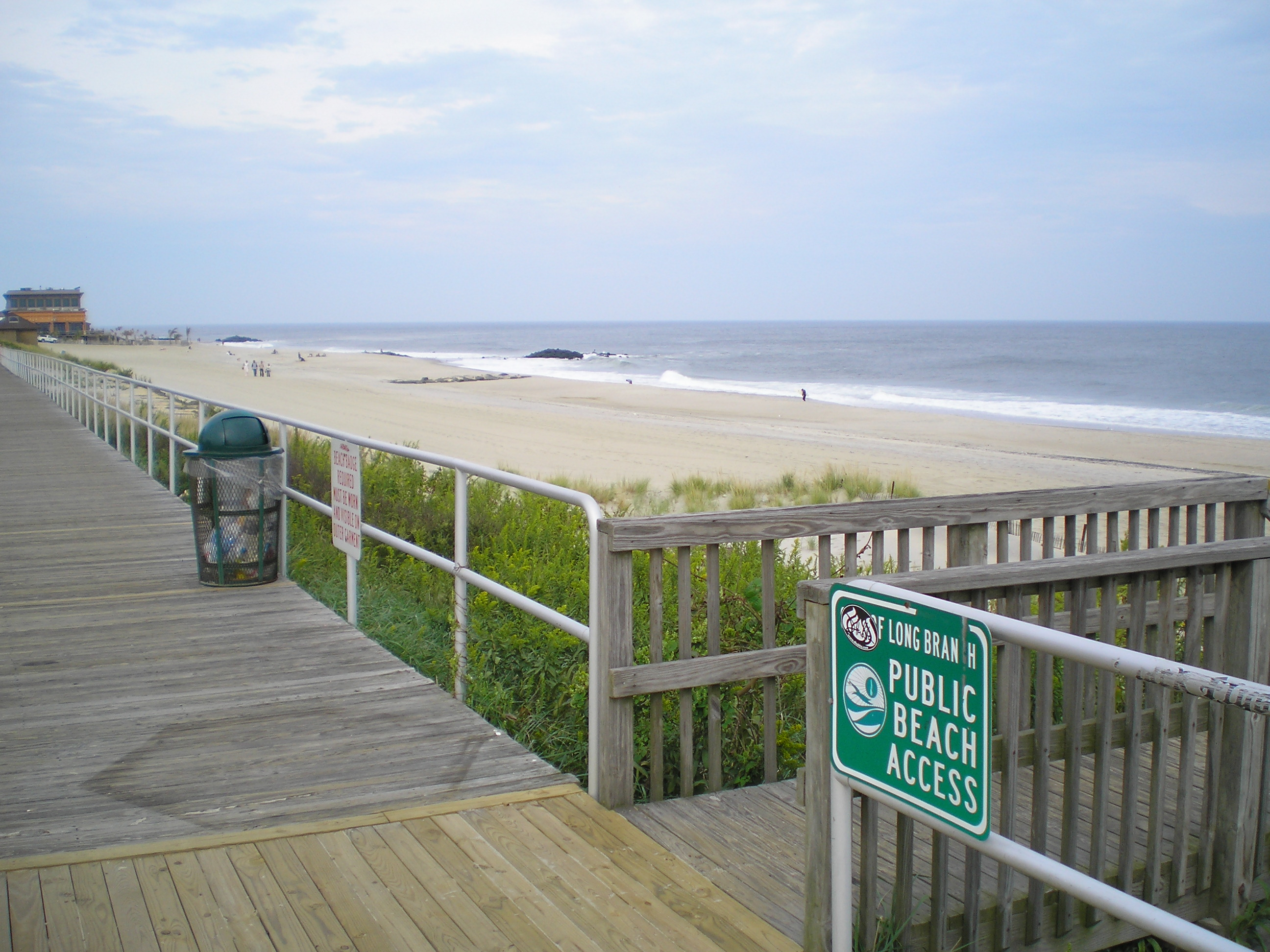
- Long Branch Beach in Elberon

- Location in Monmouth County (Inset: Monmouth County in New Jersey) Elberon (New Jersey) Elberon (the United States)
- Coordinates: 40°16′09″N 73°59′30″W
- Country: United States
- State: New Jersey
- County: Monmouth
- City: Long Branch
- Elevation: 39 ft (12 m)
- ZIP code: 07740
- GNIS feature ID: 882452

Elberon is an unincorporated community that is part of Long Branch in Monmouth County, New Jersey, United States. The area is served as United States Postal Service ZIP code 07740.

According to the 2020–2024 American Community Survey 5-year estimates, ZIP Code Tabulation Area (ZCTA) 07740 had a population of 32,917.

== History ==
Elberon derives its name from the name of one of its founders, L. B. Brown.

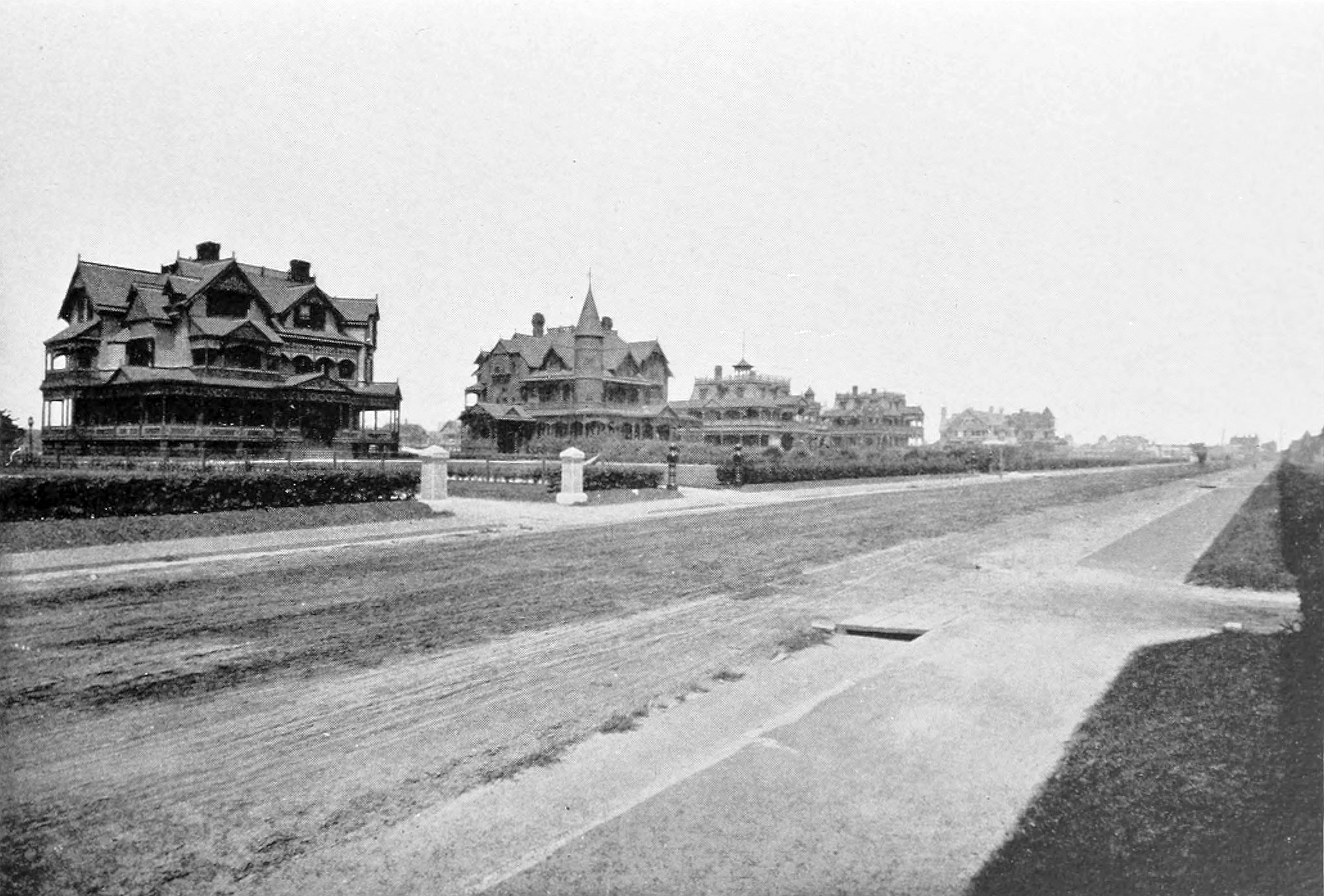
Ocean Avenue, 1902

The Elberon station offers NJ Transit train service along the North Jersey Coast Line. The original station was listed on the National Register of Historic Places in 1978 (Reference #78001777). However, it burned down and was removed from the Register in 1990.

Elberon was a beach resort community in the late 18th century. In the 19th century it was a "Hollywood" of the east, where some of the greatest theatrical and other performers of the day gathered and performed. It was visited by presidents Chester A. Arthur, James Garfield, Ulysses S. Grant, Benjamin Harrison, Rutherford B. Hayes, William McKinley, and Woodrow Wilson. Seven Presidents Park, a park near the beach, is named in honor of their visits.

The Church of the Presidents, where all seven worshiped, is the only structure left in Long Branch associated with them. The church was built in 1879, designed by New York architects William Appleton Potter and Robert Henderson Robertson.

United States President James A. Garfield was brought to Long Branch in the hope that the fresh air and quiet in Elberon might aid his recovery after being shot on July 2, 1881, an incident that left the assassin's bullet encysted behind the pancreas. He died here on September 19, 1881, at age 49. The Garfield Tea House, built from railroad ties that carried Garfield's train, is in Elberon.

== Notable people ==
People who were born in, residents of, or otherwise closely associated with Elberon include:

- Paul Baerwald (1871–1961), banker and philanthropist.
- George Tuttle Brokaw (1879–1935), American lawyer and sportsman; first husband of Clare Boothe Luce and father of her only child.
- Mel Ferrer (1917–2008), actor.
- Denise Morrison (born 1954), business executive who served as president and chief executive officer of Campbell's from 2011 through 2018.
- Maggie Wilderotter (born 1955), former chief executive officer of Frontier Communications.
