= Long Branch Public Schools =

School district in Monmouth County, New Jersey, US

Address
- 540 Broadway Long Branch, Monmouth County, New Jersey, 07740; United States
- Coordinates: 40.299908°N 74.000399°W

District information
- Grades: pre-K to 12
- Superintendent: Francisco E. Rodriguez
- Business administrator: Matthew E. Johnson, Ed.D.
- Schools: 8
- Affiliation: Former Abbott district

Students and staff
- Enrollment: 5,494 (as of 2022–23)
- Faculty: 495.0 FTEs
- Student–teacher ratio: 11.1:1

Other information
- District Factor Group: B
- Website: www.longbranch.k12.nj.us
Ind.	Per pupil	District spending	Rank (*)	K-12 average	%± vs. average
1A	Total Spending	$21,220	87	$18,891	12.3%
1	Budgetary Cost	14,682	57	14,783	−0.7%
2	Classroom Instruction	8,920	62	8,763	1.8%
6	Support Services	2,382	58	2,392	−0.4%
8	Administrative Cost	1,368	36	1,485	−7.9%
10	Operations & Maintenance	1,691	57	1,783	−5.2%
13	Extracurricular Activities	277	62	268	3.4%
16	Median Teacher Salary	58,975	21	64,043
Data from NJDoE 2014 Taxpayers' Guide to Education Spending. *Of K-12 districts with more than 3,500 students. Lowest spending=1; Highest=103

Long Branch Public Schools is a comprehensive community public school district that serves students in pre-kindergarten through twelfth grade in the city of Long Branch, in Monmouth County, in the U.S. state of New Jersey. The district is one of 31 former Abbott districts statewide that were established pursuant to the decision by the New Jersey Supreme Court in Abbott v. Burke which are now referred to as "SDA Districts" based on the requirement for the state to cover all costs for school building and renovation projects in these districts under the supervision of the New Jersey Schools Development Authority.

As of the 2022–23 school year, the district, comprised of eight schools, had an enrollment of 5,494 students and 495.0 classroom teachers (on an FTE basis), for a student–teacher ratio of 11.1:1.

The district had been classified by the New Jersey Department of Education as being in District Factor Group "B", the second lowest of eight groupings. District Factor Groups organize districts statewide to allow comparison by common socioeconomic characteristics of the local districts. From lowest socioeconomic status to highest, the categories are A, B, CD, DE, FG, GH, I and J.

== Schools ==
Schools in the district (with 2022–23 enrollment data from the National Center for Education Statistics) are:

Early childhood learning centers

- Lenna W. Conrow School (with 298 students; in grades PreK–K)
  - Bonita Potter-Brown, principal
- Joseph M. Ferraina Early Childhood Learning Center (291; PreK–K)
  - Laura Bland, principal
- Morris Avenue School (310; PreK–K)
  - Kimberly Walker, principal

Primary schools

- Amerigo A. Anastasia School (587; 1–5)
  - Michelle Merckx, principal
  - Laura Widdis, principal
- George L. Catrambone Elementary School (712; 1–5)
  - Nicole Carroll, principal
  - Jessica Sargent, principal
- Gregory School (600; 1–5)
  - Nicholas Greenwood, principal
  - Stephanie Dispoto, principal

Middle school

- Long Branch Middle School (1,108; 6–8)
  - Christopher Volpe, lead principal

High school

- Long Branch High School (1,548; 9–12)
  - Vincent Muscillo Jr., lead principal

Alternative

- Audrey W. Clark School / The Academy of Alternative Programs, an alternative education program
  - Kristine Villano, principal

George L. Catrambone Elementary School was constructed at a total cost over $40 million for a facility that was designed to house 800 students in a facility covering 109,000 square feet (10,100 m^{2}) for which construction began in 2012. With the start of the 2014-15 school year, a realignment of the district closed West End School, converted Morris Avenue School for early childhood use and repurposed Audrey W. Clark School for alternative education.

== Superintendent pay ==
In March 2006, the New Jersey State Commission of Investigation issued a report to Governor Jon Corzine specifically and to the public in general that addressed "Questionable and Hidden Compensation for Public School Administrators". The report disclosed that the Long Branch school district had reported to the New Jersey Department of Education that Superintendent of Schools Joseph Ferraina (who retired in 2011) was receiving a base salary of $193,149 when, as the Commission of Investigation stated, he was actually receiving a total compensation of $305,099, some 58% higher than the amount reported to the State. By 2011, Ferraina was earning a base salary of $242,550.

After three years as chief school administrator, Michael Salvatore accepted a contract in August 2014 under which he would earn less in base pay due to the state's superintendent salary cap. The school board approved a $165,000 annual base salary for Salvatore in a contract that expired in June 2019, which is a $10,000 reduction from his previous salary with the district. However, Salvatore's newest endeavor will supplement the contract with $10,000, which entailed governing the Deal School District as a shared service superintendent.

== Administration ==
Core members of the district's administration are:

- Francisco E. Rodriguez, superintendent
- Matthew E. Johnson, Ed.D., business administrator and board secretary

== Board of education ==
The district's board of education, comprised of nine members, sets policy and oversees the fiscal and educational operation of the district through its administration. As a Type II school district, the board's trustees are elected directly by voters to serve three-year terms of office on a staggered basis, with three seats up for election each year held (since 2012) as part of the November general election. The board appoints a superintendent to oversee the district's day-to-day operations and a business administrator to supervise the business functions of the district.

The current members of the Long Branch Board of Education are:

- Joseph M. Ferraina, Board President (term expires December 2027)
- Violeta Peters, Board Vice President (2027)
- Armand R. Zambrano Jr. (2026)
- Tasha Youngblood Brown (2026)
- Sofji "Tony" Valdiviezo (2026)
- Dominic R. Sama (2028)
- Sandra Giordano (2028)
- Cipora Winters (2028)
- Raymond Garland Jr. (2026; appointed to fill a vacant seat)
