= Denise Morrison =

American business executive (born 1954)

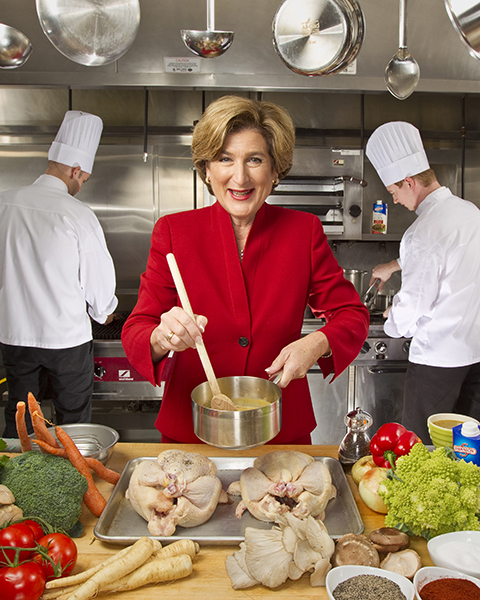
- Denise Morrison in the Campbell Soup Company test kitchen in 2012
- Born: January 13, 1954 (age 72); Elberon, New Jersey
- Education: Boston College (BS)
- Spouse(s): Barry J. Mullen (m. 1975) Thomas C. Morrison (m. 1985)
- Relatives: Maggie Wilderotter (sister)

Denise M. Morrison (née Sullivan; born January 13, 1954) is an American business executive who served as president and chief executive officer of Campbell's from 2011 through 2018. Named the "21st Most Powerful Woman in Business" by Fortune magazine in 2011, Morrison was elected a director of Campbell in October 2010. She became Campbell's 12th leader in the company's 140-year history. Morrison retired from Campbell in May 2018.

== Early life ==
Morrison was born and raised in the Elberon section of Long Branch, New Jersey. She is one of four sisters who have all had business careers. The "Sullivan Sisters" were featured in a 2007 article in The Wall Street Journal titled "Raising Women to Be Leaders." Denise is the first-born; Maggie Wilderotter was chairman and CEO of Frontier Communications; Colleen Bastkowski was a regional vice president of sales at Expedia Corporate Travel; and Andrea Doelling, a champion horse jumper, was senior vice president of sales at AT&T Wireless. Their father Dennis B. Sullivan—a Korean War veteran and AT&T executive—wanted to share everything he knew about business with his daughters. He reportedly talked with them while they were still in grade school about setting profit-margin goals. Their mother, Connie Sullivan, taught them that ambition is a part of femininity.

Morrison graduated from Long Branch High School. She earned her B.S. degree in economics and psychology from Boston College, graduating magna cum laude.

== Career ==
Morrison began her career in the sales organization at Procter & Gamble in Boston, Massachusetts. She later joined Pepsi-Cola in trade and business development. She then spent most of the 1980s at Nestle USA, where she held senior marketing and sales positions. In 1995, Morrison moved to Nabisco Inc. She served as senior vice president and led the Nabisco Food Company's sales organization and was general manager for the Down the Street division.

Before joining Campbell's, Morrison served as executive vice president and general manager of Kraft Foods' snacks and confections divisions, responsible for leading brands such as Planters nuts, Life Savers candies, and Altoids mints.

Morrison joined Campbell in April 2003 as president-global sales and chief customer officer, and was named president-Campbell USA in June 2005. She was named senior vice president and president-North America soup, sauces and beverages in October 2007 and handled the Campbell USA, North America Foodservice, and Campbell Canada businesses. She was appointed executive vice president and chief operating officer in October 2010, leading all of Campbell's global businesses, corporate strategy, global advertising & design and research & development.

Morrison was named president and CEO of Campbell Soup Company on August 1, 2011. Morrison retired from Campbell in May 2018.

Morrison's compensation at the beginning of fiscal year 2012 included an annual base salary of $950,000, a fiscal 2011 annual cash incentive of $602,292 and a fiscal 2012 long-term incentive grant of $4,845,000. Campbell's fiscal year runs from August 1 to July 31.

== Board service ==
Morrison is a former director of the Goodyear Tire & Rubber Company and a former director of Ballard Power Systems Inc. She is a founding member of the Healthy Weight Commitment Foundation, an initiative composed of manufacturers and retailers designed to combat obesity in the marketplace, workplace, and in schools through communication and education. She is also on the non-profit board of Students in Free Enterprise.

Additionally, she serves on the board of the Grocery Manufacturers Association and is the chair of its Health and Wellness Committee. Morrison is also on the board of the Consumer Goods Forum.

She became a member of MetLife's board of directors in 2014.

She is the former chair of Catalyst's Advisory Board and former President of the N.J. Women's Forum, and has served on the Board of the Food Industry Crusade Against Hunger and Leadership California.

Morrison resigned from President Trump's American Manufacturing Council on August 16, 2017.

Morrison's stated: "Following yesterday's remarks from the president, I can not remain on the Manufacturing Jobs Initiative. I will continue to support all efforts to spur economic growth and advocate for the values that have always made America great."

The council was disbanded later the same day.

== Awards ==
In 2011, Forbes named Morrison the 80th most powerful woman in the world.

Morrison was also named the "21st Most Powerful Woman in Business" by Fortune. Morrison was a featured speaker at Fortune's 2011 Most Powerful Women Summit, sharing the stage with her sister Maggie Wilderotter, chairman and CEO of Frontier Communications. Morrison and Wilderotter are the first sisters ever to make the list together. Morrison was also recognized by Fortune as one of the "Most Powerful Women" in 2012, 2013, and in 2017.

Morrison has also received the Power 50, Supermarket News 2011; "Woman of Distinction" American Heart Association of New Jersey, 2010; One of the 50 Most Influential Irish Women, Irish Voice 2010; Trailblazer Award; "Top Woman in Grocery," Progressive Grocer magazine, 2008, 2009, and 2010; One of the Top 50 Women in Business in the State of N.J., NJBIZ magazine, 2008; One of the Top 50 Women to Watch, The Wall Street Journal, 2007; "Aiming High Award" by Legal Momentum, 2007; and Garden State "Woman of the Year" for Corporations, Garden State Women magazine, 2007.

== Personal life ==
Morrison lives in Princeton, New Jersey, with her husband, Tom, and has two grown daughters.
