= Gerry Matthews =

American basketball coach (born 1941)

Gerry Matthews (born October 27, 1941) is an American basketball coach. He retired in August 2016 as the head men's basketball coach at Stockton University in Galloway Township, New Jersey, a position he had held since 1985. Matthews previously coached basketball at the high school level. He is an alumnus of Kean University.

A resident of Brielle, New Jersey, Matthews accumulated a record of 228–98 as a basketball coach at Long Branch High School and Rumson-Fair Haven Regional High School.

== See also ==
- List of college men's basketball coaches with 600 wins
