= Deal School District =

School district in Monmouth County, New Jersey, US

Address
- 201 Roseld Avenue Deal, Monmouth County, New Jersey, 07723; United States
- Coordinates: 40.24764°N 74.005876°W

District information
- Grades: K-8
- Superintendent: Donato J. Saponaro Sr.
- Business administrator: Pia Lordi
- Schools: 1

Students and staff
- Enrollment: 154 (as of 2023–24)
- Faculty: 20.1 FTEs
- Student–teacher ratio: 7.7:1

Other information
- District Factor Group: NA
- Website: www.dealschool.org
Ind.	Per pupil	District spending	Rank (*)	K-8 average	%± vs. average
1A	Total Spending	$25,266	65	$18,891	33.7%
1	Budgetary Cost	17,450	53	14,159	23.2%
2	Classroom Instruction	8,521	24	8,659	−1.6%
6	Support Services	2,650	44	2,167	22.3%
8	Administrative Cost	1,655	37	1,547	7.0%
10	Operations & Maintenance	4,253	69	1,612	163.8%
13	Extracurricular Activities	371	61	104	256.7%
16	Median Teacher Salary	55,484	21	61,136
Data from NJDoE 2014 Taxpayers' Guide to Education Spending. *Of K-8 districts with up to 400 students. Lowest spending=1; Highest=71

The Deal School District is a community public school district that serves students in kindergarten through eighth grade from Deal, in Monmouth County, in the U.S. state of New Jersey. The school was established in September 1953.

As of the 2022–23 school year, the district, comprising one school, had an enrollment of 160 students and 19.6 classroom teachers (on an FTE basis), for a student–teacher ratio of 8.2:1. In the 2016–17 school year, Deal had the 35th-smallest enrollment of any school district in the state, with 165 students.

The district participates in the Interdistrict Public School Choice Program, which allows non-resident students to attend the district's school without cost to their parents, with tuition covered by the State of New Jersey. Available slots are announced annually by grade. In the 2002-03 school year, nearly 75% of students at Deal School attended from outside the district on a tuition basis, paying $4,300 per student, per year, with students coming from the neighboring communities of Loch Arbour, Asbury Park, Ocean Township, Red Bank and Belmar. By the 2013-14 school year, nearly 90% of the district's enrollment was from choice students, for whom the state paid the district $12,500 in supplemental aid per student.

For ninth through twelfth grades, students attend Shore Regional High School, as part of a sending/receiving relationship. As of the 2023–24 school year, the high school had an enrollment of 558 students and 58.6 classroom teachers (on an FTE basis), for a student–teacher ratio of 9.5:1.

== History ==
Before establishing a relationship with Shore Regional, the district had a previous agreement under which students from deal attended Asbury Park High School in neighboring Asbury Park as part of a sending/receiving relationship with the Asbury Park Public Schools.

== School ==
Deal School served an enrollment of 152 students in grades K–8 as of the 2023–24 school year.

== Administration ==
Core members of the district's administration are:

- Donato J. Saponaro Sr., superintendent of schools
- Pia Lordi, business administrator

Michael Salvatore, superintendent of the Long Branch Public Schools, had overseen the Deal district under a shared services arrangement reached in August 2014 in which Salvatore was paid an additional $10,000 from Deal on top of his $165,000 base salary.

== Board of education ==
The district's board of education, comprised of five members, sets policy and oversees the fiscal and educational operation of the district through its administration. As a Type II school district, the board's trustees are elected directly by voters to serve three-year terms of office on a staggered basis, with either one or two seats up for election each year held (since 2012) as part of the November general election. The board appoints a superintendent to oversee the district's day-to-day operations and a business administrator to supervise the business functions of the district.
