= Maggie Wilderotter =

American businessperson

- Born: Mary Agnes Sullivan; February 9, 1955 (age 71); Neptune Township, New Jersey, U.S.
- Education: College of the Holy Cross (BA)
- Title: Chair of Docusign
- Board member of: Costco; Hewlett Packard; Juno Therapeutics; Lyft
- Relatives: Denise Morrison (sister)

Maggie Wilderotter (born Mary Agnes Sullivan; February 9, 1955) is an American businessperson who is the chairwoman of Docusign, where she was also interim CEO from April to October 2022, and the former chief executive officer of Frontier Communications from November 2004 to April 2015, then executive chairman of the company until April 2016.

During her tenure with Frontier, the company grew from a regional telephone company with customer revenues of less than $3 billion to a national broadband, voice and video provider with operations in 29 states and annualized revenues in excess of $10 billion.

== Early life and family ==
Wilderotter was born in Neptune Township, New Jersey. She grew up in the Elberon section of Long Branch, New Jersey, and graduated from Long Branch High School in 1973. She earned her undergraduate degree in 1977 from College of the Holy Cross in Worcester, Massachusetts, in economics and business administration. She served two terms as a member of the board of trustees for the college and is an active alumna. She has been awarded an Honorary Doctor of Engineering degree from the Stevens Institute of Technology and an Honorary Doctor of Laws degree from the University of Rochester.

Wilderotter is the second-oldest of the four girls. One of her sisters is Denise Morrison, former president and Chief Executive Officer of Campbell's.

== Career ==
Wilderotter was Senior Vice President of Global Business Strategy and ran the Worldwide Public Sector at Microsoft. Before this, she was president and CEO of Wink Communications Inc., Executive Vice President of National Operations for AT&T Wireless Services Inc., Chief Executive Officer of AT&T's Aviation Communications Division, and a Senior Vice President of McCaw Cellular Communications Inc.

Wilderotter serves on the boards of Costco Wholesale Corporation, Docusign, Hewlett Packard Enterprise, Juno Therapeutics, Inc., and Lyft as well as a number of private and non-profit organizations.

Wilderotter previously served on the President's National Security Telecommunications Advisory Committee (NSTAC). From October 2010 to October 2012, she was Vice Chairman of NSTAC and from October 2012 to November 2014, she served as Chairman of NSTAC. Mrs. Wilderotter currently serves on the President's Commission on Enhancing National Cybersecurity.

Wilderotter is a member of the Board of Directors of The Conference Board; a member of the Executive Committee of the Catalyst Board of Directors; a member of the Board of Women in America; and a member of the Business Council and the Committee of 200. In 2014, she chaired the Blue Ribbon Committee on Board Strategy for NACD and is a member of WomenCorporateDirectors (WCD).

On June 21, 2022, Wilderotter was appointed interim CEO of document management company Docusign, and served as interim CEO until former Google executive Allan Thygesen took over on October 10, 2022. Wilderotter will continue to serve as chairwoman of the board.
