= Long Branch Pier =

Pier in New Jersey, United States

Coordinates: 40.302620°N 73.979487°W

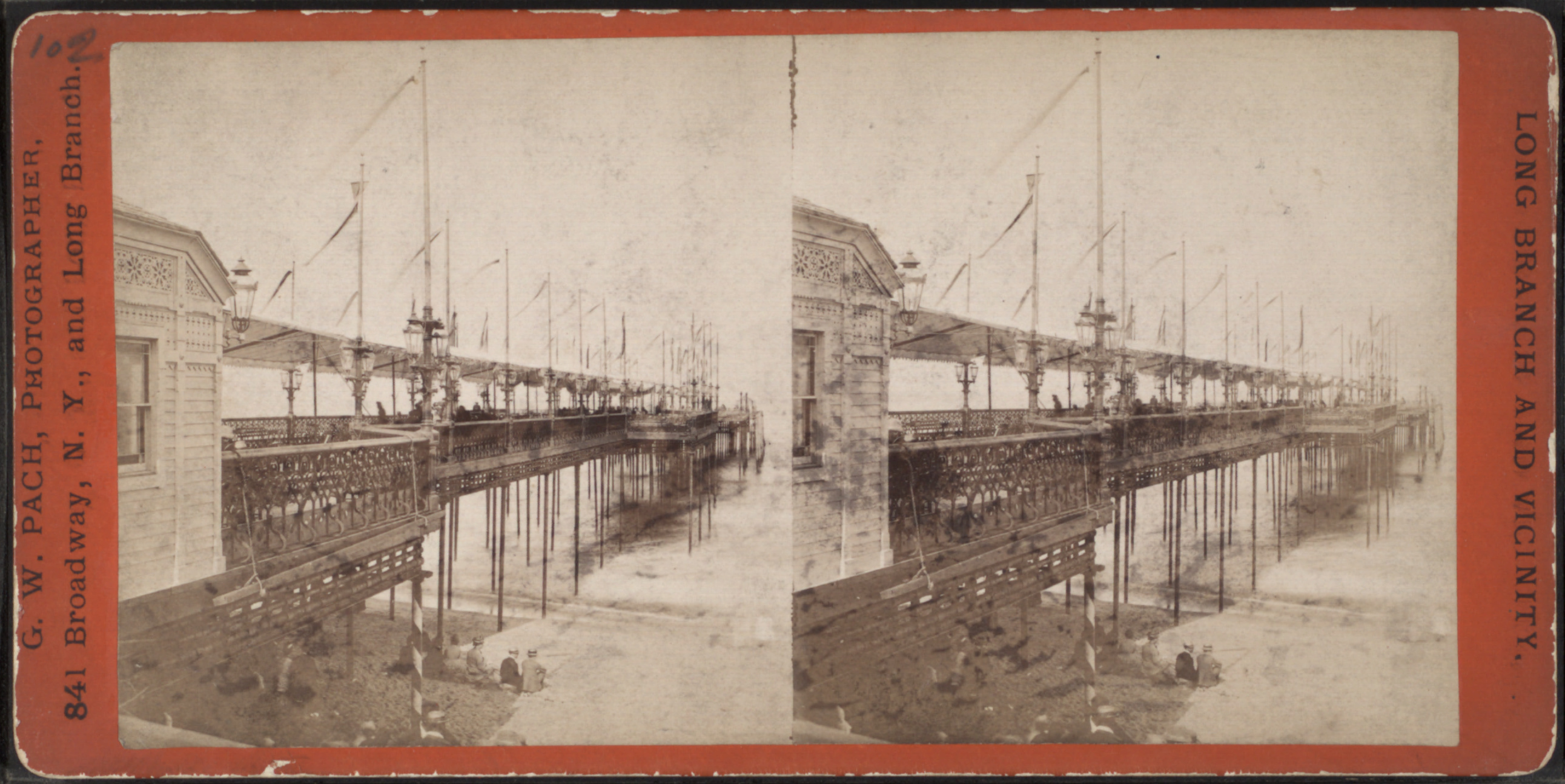
Long Branch Pier.

The Long Branch Pier was a pier located at 65 Ocean Ave, in Long Branch, New Jersey, United States.

== History ==
The pier was popular among fishermen and club goers who enjoyed late nights at "The Pier Pub" night club. From the late 1950s -- all through the 1960s and into the 1970s, it was the home of Leon's Amusements, a popular "penny" arcade that was dominated inside by a merry-go-round along with numerous skee-ball, pin ball and "spin and win" machines. The pier itself was owned by the Sowul family until May 1979, when developers Pat Cicalese and Carmen Ricci teamed together to buy the pier and build the Haunted Mansion, inspired by the Brigantine Castle in nearby Brigantine. The new pier had an arcade, several retail stores, a 10,000-square-foot (930 m^{2}) haunted mansion, a McDonald's, Big Al's Hot Dogs & Lemon Aide and Junior's Restaurant. The pier was heavily advertised in New Jersey and New York City. By 1985, Kid's World was introduced, it was an amusement park inspired by Sesame Place in Langhorne, Pennsylvania. The park featured a pay-one-price system, that included both the Haunted Mansion on the Pier and the Giant Waterslide and other attractions across the street. That section of Ocean Avenue was closed and became part of the park so kids could go from one side of the park to the other without fear of traffic. After the change, the advertisements changed from gruesome mansion photos, to happy, family-friendly photos of kids laughing.

== In the end ==
On June 8, 1987, a gas leak and an electrical glitch sparked a fire under the pier. The heavy winds that day caused the fire to spread, destroying the whole pier. Luckily, nobody was injured.

There were rebuilding plans for the pier, but with almost no insurance, and no banks offering to pay for the project, the plans would never come to be. In 2001, after 14 years of slow deterioration, the remnants were torn down and replaced by a mixed-use shopping/dining/entertainment complex, Pier Village, which opened in 2005.

In 2005, it was announced that a new pier is in the works for the waterfront of Long Branch.

In 2016, the Federal Transit Administration (FTA) awarded the City of Long Branch a $2.4 million grant to hire a contractor for design of a new pier. The funding proposal was built around the concept that a rebuilt pier would house a ferry terminal with commuter access to Manhattan. TDG-NJ Planning and Architecture firm was contracted by the City in April 2016 to draft a conceptual design for a pier and ferry terminal. While the concept design was funded by this grant, it is expected private investors will be needed to fund construction. A pier design would also need permits and additional approvals from the State of New Jersey.
