= Pier Village =

Victorian-inspired mixed-use community in Long Branch, New Jersey

Coordinates: 40.301818°N 73.978736°W

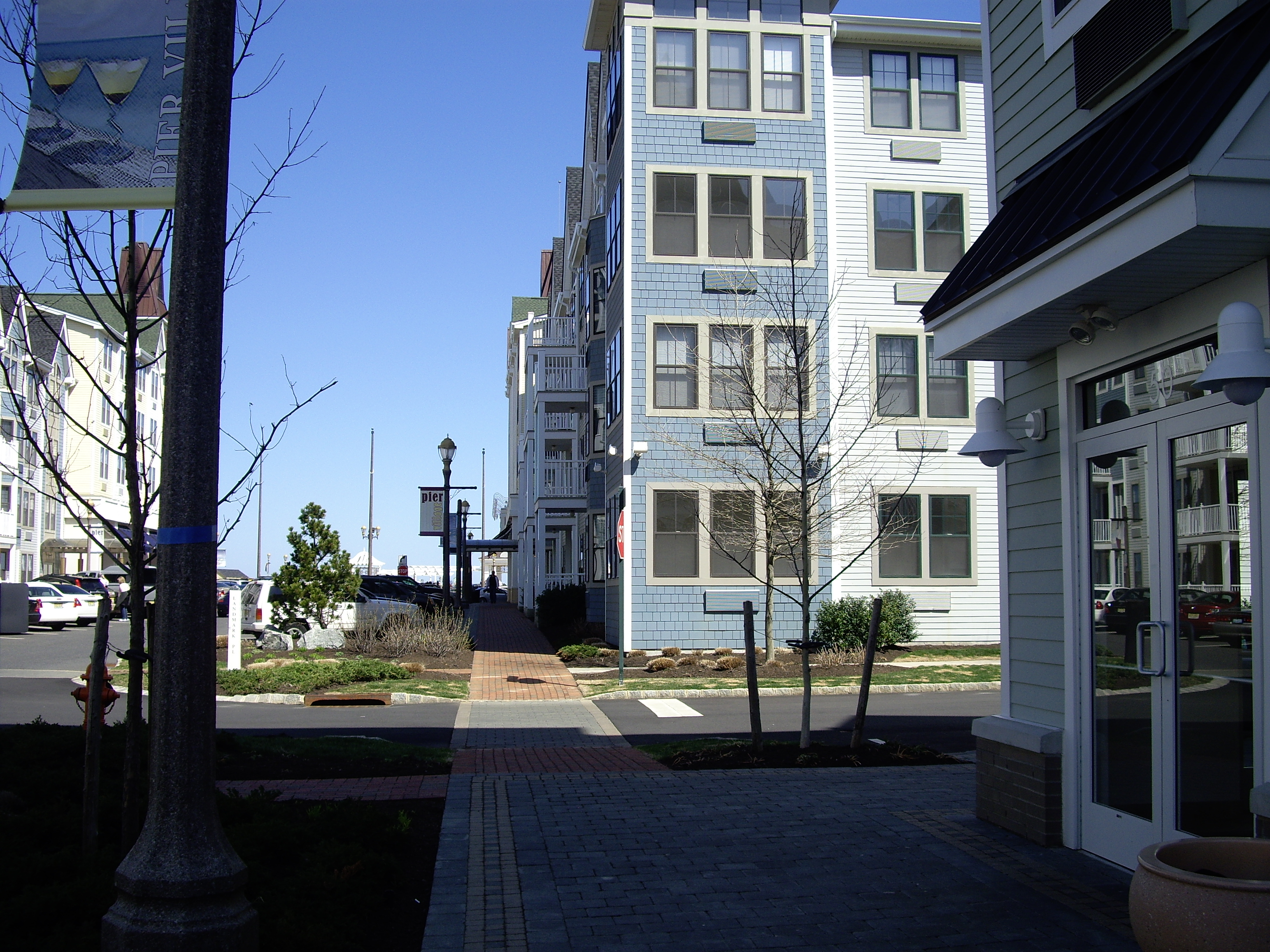
Pier Village in Long Branch, New Jersey

Pier Village is a Victorian-inspired mixed-use community located in Long Branch, New Jersey along the Atlantic Ocean. It opened in 2005.

== History ==
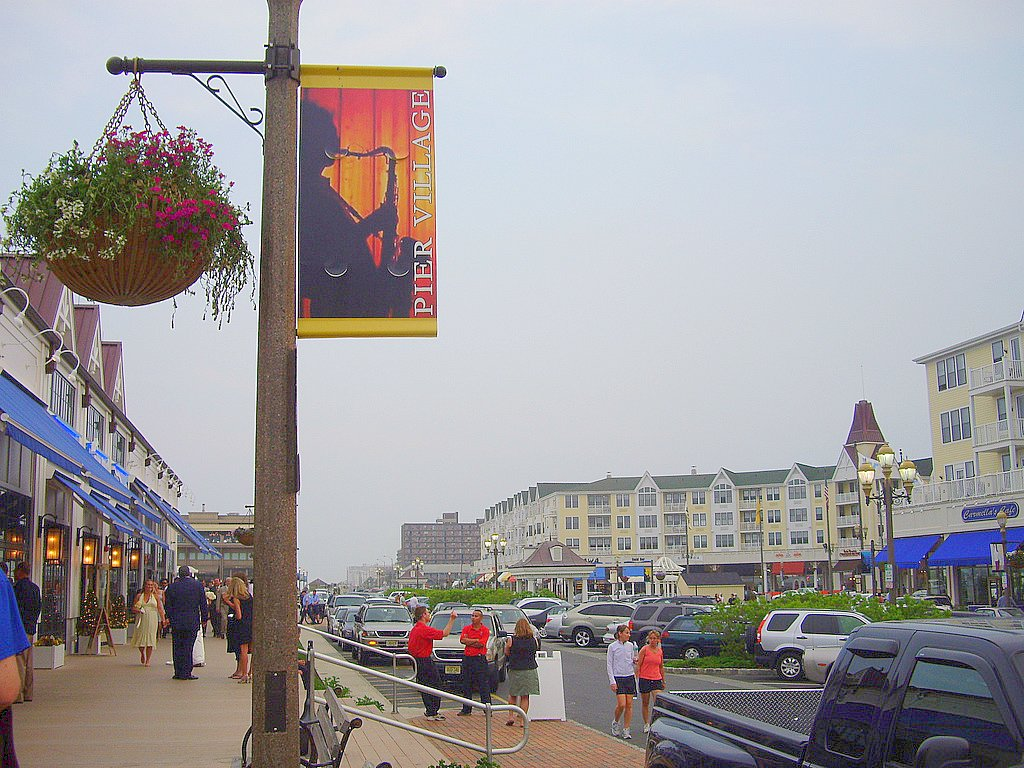
The main Pier Village Shopping area

The land that Pier Village now sits on was originally that of the Long Branch Pier and the Kid's World amusement park.

On June 8, 1987, at around 3 p.m., a fire broke out underneath the boardwalk in an electrical and gas box at the end of the pier. The fire quickly spread throughout the pier despite efforts of the Long Branch Fire Department to save it. After the fire, only the water attractions across the street from the pier remained. In the following weeks, business had slowed, and the remaining portion of Kid's World closed permanently at the end of the summer.

The owner, Pat Cicalese, planned on rebuilding the pier. However, his insurance did not cover the cost to rebuild what was destroyed and the town would not fund the project, so the plans were abandoned. What was left of Kid's World remained abandoned for 17 years after the fire.

Remains of the pier were demolished in the late 1990s. The rest of Kid's World across the street met the wrecking ball in 2002. The pier, which was built in three phases included stores, apartments, a condominium, and amusements. The first phase was completed in 2005 at a cost of $100 million.

In 2005, Applied Development Company, led by brothers David Barry and Michael Barry (the sons of Joseph Barry), was designated the developer of the 16-acre (65,000 m^{2}) site by the City of Long Branch and soon began construction of Pier Village, starting with the rebuilding of the boardwalk. 322 rental apartments were built in four-story buildings on Ocean Avenue and more were added in the construction of the second phase.

== Features ==
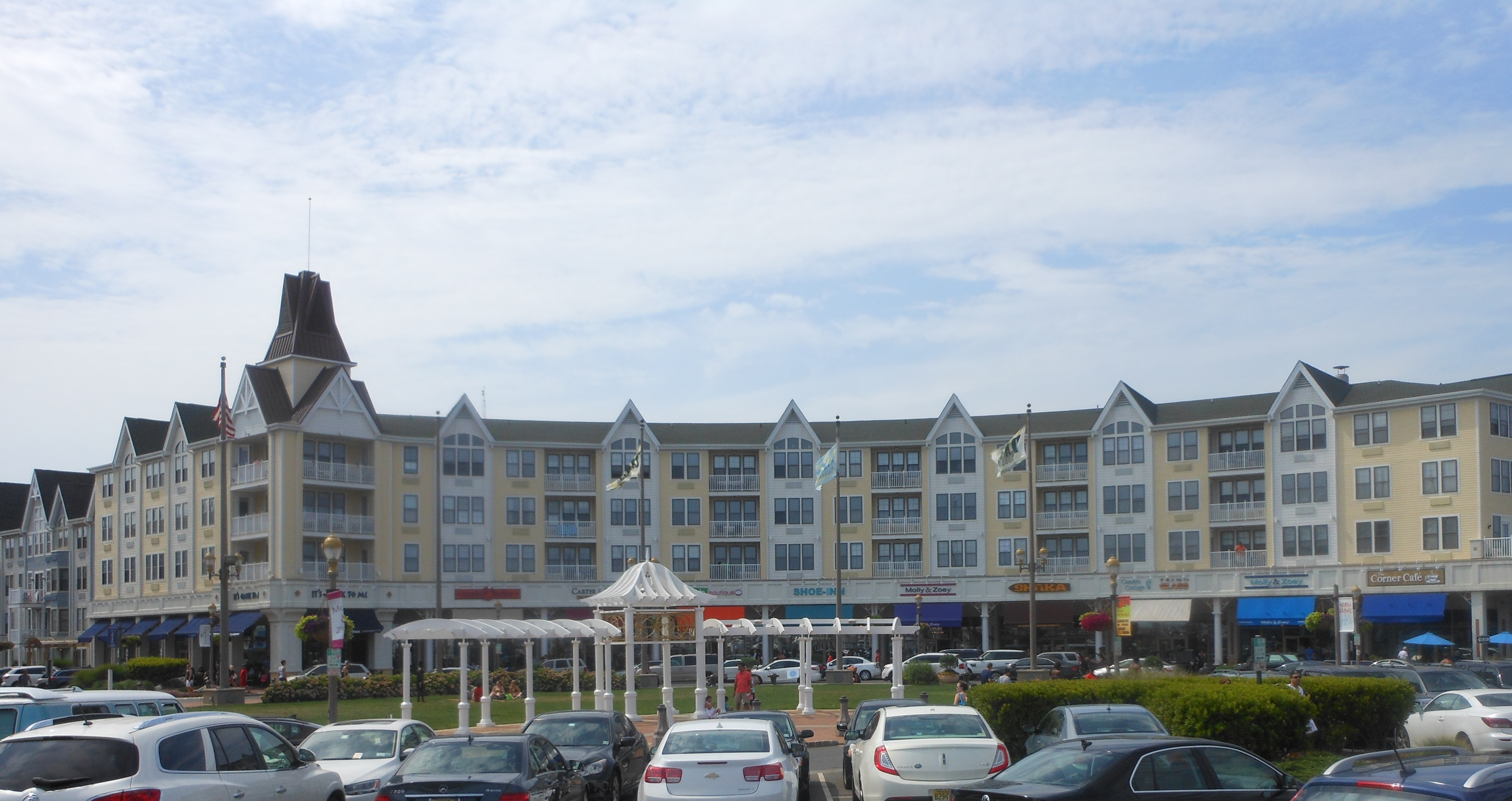
Pier Village at Long Branch, NJ

Pier Village consists of 536 rental residences sitting atop more than 100,000 square feet (9,300 m^{2}) of retail space. A public grassy area called Festival Plaza is the site of regular events, including concerts, arts & crafts fairs, outdoor movies, and holiday events.

The tenants are mostly local businesses, most from Monmouth County, but there are national brands, such as Rocky Mountain Chocolate, and Gold's Gym.

There are three restaurants situated on the boardwalk facing the ocean: Avenue, Sirena, and McLoone's. Of these, only McLoone's Pier House is free-standing. McLoone's was the only building built from the ground up by the restaurateur and was open a year in advance of the rest of the commercial properties within the Village. The developers David Barry and Michael Barry, along with partners, opened up a members-only beach club called Le Club. Designed by London-based architect David Collins, who also designed London’s Nobu Berkeley Street restaurant and the famed Blue Bar, Le Club is a 25,000-square-foot (2,300 m^{2}) resort featuring a modern tri-level building with a rooftop pool and sun deck offering views of the ocean and a private beach area with palm trees and cabanas. Travel & Leisure Magazine named it one of “20 Great American Beaches" in its July 2007 issue, and New York Magazine profiled it in its annual summer issue.

== Criticism ==
The primary criticism of Pier Village was that Eminent Domain was abused to secure the land for development. Many argued that the homes seized were not "blighted" as the developer claimed. Residents were removed from their homes so that new homes could be constructed, which falls outside of the legal bounds of Eminent Domain, which states land can only be seized for public use.

The New York Times reported: "Either way, the fight has become a public-relations disaster for the city as it tries to reclaim its glory days, when seven United States presidents vacationed here and New York's business barons traveled by stagecoach to fill the gambling halls. The 30 or so holdout homeowners have planted signs saying NOT For Sale in their sandy yards, and they have filled the windows of their pastel bungalows with posters declaring Eminent Domain Abuse, signed petitions, shouted at public meetings and written vitriolic letters to the local newspaper questioning the mayor's and the City Council's motives."

In 2010, the state ruled that the downtown area was not blighted, and thus could not be seized by Eminent Domain to be redeveloped.

== Awards ==
- The Urban Land Institute (ULI) named Pier Village “Project of the Year” in 2006.
- New Jersey Governor’s Tourism Award in 2009

== Expansions ==
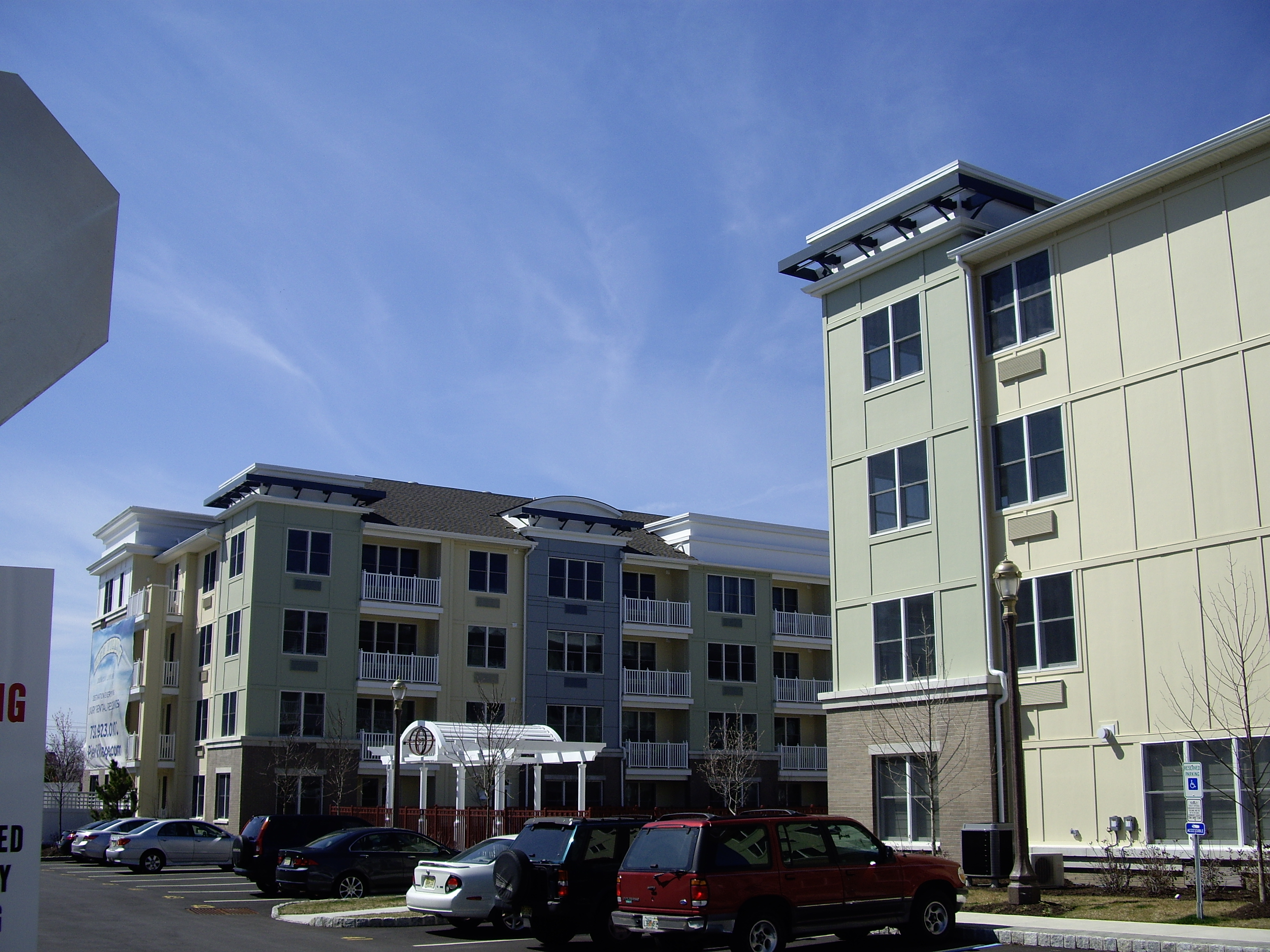
Buildings in Phase 2 of Pier Village

=== New pier ===
In 2005, plans for a new pier were unveiled.

The new plans would include:

- A ferry terminal
- An area for fishing
- A 30,000 sq ft (2,800 m^{2}). area for exhibitions that would include a restaurant
- A beach-side stage
- An amphitheater
- A 3,500 to 5,000 sq ft (460 m^{2}). area offshore that will be used for oceanographic and marine science educational classes

=== Hotel addition ===
Part of the Phase II expansion is Bungalow, a 25,000-square-foot (2,300 m^{2}), 24-room boutique hotel with views of the ocean that is scheduled to open in May 2009. Bungalow is much more modern than the original Victorian-styled buildings and sits at the entrance of Pier Village at the corner of Ocean Blvd. and Laird Street.

=== Pier Village Phase III ===
Applied Development Company is seeking approvals from the City for a third and final phase at Pier Village which will consist of a 100-room hotel, 200 rental residences, 75 condominium homes, 20,000 square feet (1,900 m^{2}) of retail space, and a new oceanfront public park.

== In popular culture ==
- A March 2008 episode of the ABC hidden-camera show, Primetime: What Would You Do?, which has actors do abnormal things (such as get into verbal fights, rob stores, etc.), showed an actor, who was significantly overweight, sitting on a bench in Pier Village while three other actors verbally insulted her.

== Developer ==
Pier Village is being developed by David Barry and Michael Barry, principals of Applied Development Company. The brothers are also principals of Ironstate Development. Other notable projects from them include:

- The W Hoboken Hotel & Residences: a new 26-story hotel offering 225 rooms and 40 condominium residences on the Hudson Riverfront in Hoboken, NJ facing mid-town Manhattan. The hotel is scheduled to open in February 2009.
- Port Liberte: a 1,290-unit master-planned community in Jersey City, NJ. 804 homes have been built to date.
- 50 Columbus: a 35-story building offering 400 rental units, a 950-car parking garage, and 25,000 square feet (2,300 m^{2}) of retail space in Jersey City, NJ.
- W Marrakech Hotel & Residences: a future hotel in Morocco, North Africa. The hotel will offer 150 hotel rooms and 50 whole-ownership villa units. The property is scheduled to open in mid-2010. W Marrakech Hotel & Residences will be a core element of the Al Maaden Resort development and will overlook an 18-hole championship golf course.
- Harrison Commons: a New Urbanist Master Planned community featuring more than 2,600 residences and 80,000 square feet (7,400 m^{2}) of retail space in Harrison, NJ adjacent to the PATH Station. Sitework is underway.
