= Long Branch High School =

High school in Monmouth County, New Jersey, US

Location
- 404 Indiana Avenue; Long Branch, Monmouth County, New Jersey 07740; United States; 40.291915°N 73.993512°W

Information
- Type: Public high school
- Established: 1899
- School district: Long Branch Public Schools
- NCES School ID: 340894003904
- Principal: Vincent Muscillo Jr. (Lead Principal); Adrian Castro (Leadership); Vanessa Giammanco (Science, Technology, Engineering & Mathematics); Kim Hyde (Visual and Performing Arts); Twana Richardson (Social Justice)
- Faculty: 124.0 FTEs
- Grades: 9–12
- Enrollment: 1,500 (as of 2024–25)
- Student to teacher ratio: 12.1:1
- Colors: Green and white
- Athletics conference: Shore Conference
- Team name: Green Wave
- Rivals: Neptune High School, Shore Regional High School, Red Bank Regional High School
- Accreditation: Middle States Association of Colleges and Schools
- Newspaper: The Trumpet
- Website: lbhs.longbranch.k12.nj.us

Long Branch High School is a comprehensive, four-year community public high school that serves students in ninth through twelfth grades in the city of Long Branch, in Monmouth County, in the U.S. state of New Jersey, operating as part of the Long Branch Public Schools. LBPS, one of 31 special-needs Abbott districts in the state, serves the city of Long Branch. The school has been accredited by the Middle States Association of Colleges and Schools Commissions on Elementary and Secondary Schools since 1928.

As of the 2024–25 school year, the school had an enrollment of 1,500 students and 124.0 classroom teachers (on an FTE basis), for a student–teacher ratio of 12.1:1. There were 1,005 students (67.0% of enrollment) eligible for free lunch and 125 (8.3% of students) eligible for reduced-cost lunch.

== History ==
The city's first secondary school was called Chattle High School, named for Thomas G. Chattle, who served as the school district's superintendent from 1857 to 1889. Constructed at a cost of $78,000 (equivalent to $3.0 million in 2025), the school opened to students in October 1899 and the four-story building remained in use as a junior high school after a newer facility was completed, until it was destroyed after a fire in 1966. The current high school building was completed in 1927 and built for $683,000 (equivalent to $12.7 million in 2025). Constructed at a cost of $72 million under the auspices of the New Jersey Schools Development Authority, a new school covering 283,000 square feet (26,300 m^{2}) of space with 75 classrooms and a 2,000-seat gym opened in September 2007 with a capacity for 1,200 students.

The high school was the original home of Monmouth University, then known as Monmouth Junior College, from 1933 to 1956 until Monmouth moved to Shadow Lawn in West Long Branch.

Students from Monmouth Beach, Oceanport, Sea Bright, and West Long Branch left the high school in September 1962 with the opening of Shore Regional High School, alleviating overcrowding that had forced the school to conduct double sessions.

== Awards, recognition and rankings ==
The school was the 228th-ranked public high school in New Jersey out of 339 schools statewide in New Jersey Monthly magazine's September 2014 cover story on the state's "Top Public High Schools", using a new ranking methodology. The school had been ranked 167th in the state of 328 schools in 2012, after being ranked 206th in 2010 out of 322 schools listed. The magazine ranked the school 246th in 2008 out of 316 schools. The school was ranked 290th in the magazine's September 2006 issue, which surveyed 316 schools across the state.

== Athletics ==
The Long Branch High School Green Wave compete in Division A North of the Shore Conference, an athletic conference comprised of public and private high schools in Monmouth County and Ocean County along the Jersey Shore. The conference operates under the jurisdiction of the New Jersey State Interscholastic Athletic Association (NJSIAA). With 1,146 students in grades 10–12, the school was classified by the NJSIAA for the 2019–20 school year as Group IV for most athletic competition purposes, which included schools with an enrollment of 1,060 to 5,049 students in that grade range. The school was classified by the NJSIAA as Group IV South for football for 2024–2026, which included schools with 890 to 1,298 students.

The boys' track team won the Group III spring / outdoor track state championship in 1933–1938, 1949, and 1967. The six-year streak of consecutive titles in the 1930s is tied for the fourth-longest streak in the state.

The boys' bowling team won the overall state championship in 1958, edging Bloomfield High School by 20 pins to take the NJSIAA's first state tournament in the sport.

The boys' track team won the Group III indoor track state championship in 1967, 1975 (as co-champion), and 1982.

The boys' basketball team won the Group III championship in 1970 (versus Orange High School in the final game of the playoff tournament), 1977 (versus Ridgefield Park High School), 1980 (versus Weequahic High School), and 1998 (versus Parsippany High School), and won the Group II title in 1997 (versus Dwight Morrow High School). The team finished the 1970 season with a 26-0 record and won the Group III title, the program's first, with a 90-74 win against Orange High School in the tournament final. The 1977 team finished the season with a 30-0 record after winning the Group III title with an 81-62 victory at the Jadwin Gymnasium against Ridgefield Park in the championship game. The 1980 team finished the season with a 26-3 with a 35-31 win against Weequahic in the Group III playoff finals.

The girls' spring track team was the Group III state champion in 1980.

The boys' track team won the Group III state indoor relay championship in 1982–1984.

The girls' bowling team was overall state champion in 1983.

The football team won the Central Jersey Group III state sectional championship in 1986 and 1999, and the Central Jersey Group IV title in 2017 and 2018. In 2017, the team won its third sectional championship with a 43–42 overtime win against Freehold Borough High School in the playoff final of the Central Jersey Group IV state sectional tournament, played at High Point Solutions Stadium. The team repeated as Central Jersey Group IV champion in 2018 with a 21-1 win against Brick Township High School. The 2018 team went on to win the inaugural Group IV Central-South Jersey Bowl Game with a 20-17 win against Shawnee High School, to finish the season with a 12-1 record, the program's first 12-win season. The team has had an ongoing Thanksgiving rivalry with Red Bank Regional High School, with Long Branch winning the 99th game in the series in 2022 to bring the overall record to 64-32-3.

The field hockey team won the Central Jersey Group III state sectional title in 1998.

The boys' wrestling team won the Central Jersey Group II state sectional title in 2008–2011 and 2013, and won the Central Jersey Group IV title in 2018 and 20215; the team won the Group II state title in 2008–2010. The school wrestling team won the 2008 Group II team state championship, its first ever, finishing the season with a perfect record of 26-0.

== Administration ==
Core members of the school's administration are:

- Vincent Muscillo Jr., Lead Principal
- Vanessa Giammanco, Principal of STEM Academy
- Adrian Castro, Principal of Leadership Academy
- Twana Richardson, Principal of School of Social Justice
- Kim Hyde, Principal of Visual and Performing Arts Academy
- Kristine Villano, Principal of Alternative Program Academy

== Notable alumni ==
- Louis R. Aikins (1926–1982, class of 1944), politician who served in the New Jersey General Assembly from 1968 to 1970
- John Beake (born 1938, class of 1957), retired American football executive who served as general manager of the Denver Broncos of the National Football League from 1985 to 1998
- Alex Bradley (born 1959), former professional basketball player who played in the NBA for the New York Knicks
- S. Thomas Gagliano (1931–2019, class of 1949), politician who served in the New Jersey Senate from 1978 to 1989
- Elizabeth Gorcey (born 1962), filmmaker, actor and writer, best known for her leading role in the film Footloose (1984)
- Mamie Johnson (1935–2017), professional baseball player who was one of three women, and the first female pitcher, to play in the Negro leagues
- Raja Feather Kelly (born c. 1985), choreographer best known for his work on Off-Broadway shows which combine "pop and queer culture"
- Tom Kerwin (born 1944), former professional basketball player who played one season in the American Basketball Association for the Pittsburgh Pipers
- Connie Lawn (1944–2018), independent broadcast journalist who, at the time of her death, was the longest-serving White House correspondent
- Sigurd Lucassen (1927–2001), carpenter and labor leader who served as president of the United Brotherhood of Carpenters and Joiners of America
- Gerri Mattson (born 1967, class of 1985), pediatrician and the Early Intervention Medical Director at the North Carolina Department of Health and Human Services Division of Child and Family Well-Being

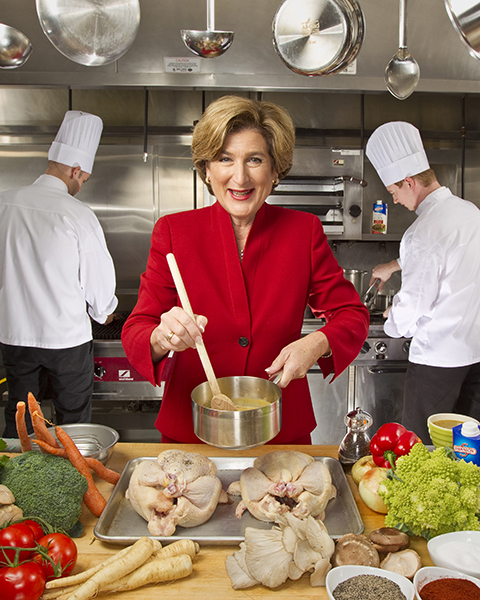
Denise Morrison in 2012

- Sam Mills (1959–2005), former professional football player who played in the NFL for the New Orleans Saints and Carolina Panthers
- John Montefusco (born 1950) former professional baseball player
- Denise Morrison (born 1954), business executive who served as president and chief executive officer of Campbell's from 2011 through 2018
- Bill Palmer (1938–2020, class of 1955), swim coach
- George R. Pettit (1929–2021), chemist and researcher in the field of natural anticancer compounds
- Robert Pinsky (born 1940), Poet Laureate Consultant in Poetry to the Library of Congress from 1997 to 2000
- Paris Qualles (born 1951, class of 1970), screenwriter and television producer
- Jim Quirk (born c. 1945, class of 1963), NFL on-field official from 1988 to 2008
- Melanie Safka (1947–2024), singer-songwriter
- John W. Slocum (1867–1938), lawyer, judge and politician, who served as president of the New Jersey Senate
- John Strollo (born 1954), college football coach
- Yvonne Thornton (born 1947), physician and best-selling author
- Army Tomaini (1918–2005), American football tackle who played for the New York Giants in 1945
- Johnny Tomaini (1902–1985), professional football player who played in the NFL for the Orange/Newark Tornadoes and Brooklyn Dodgers
- Clinton Wheeler (born 1959), former professional basketball player
- Maggie Wilderotter (born 1955, class of 1973), former chief executive officer of Frontier Communications

== Notable faculty ==
- Gerry Matthews (born 1941), 30-year college basketball coach who coached the Long Branch High School basketball team
