= Army Tomaini =

American football player (1918–2005)

Amadeo “Army” Tomaini
No. 55
- Position: Tackle

Personal information
- Born: February 5, 1918; Long Branch, New Jersey
- Died: May 25, 2005 (aged 87); Tallahassee, Florida
- Listed height: 6 ft 0 in (1.83 m)
- Listed weight: 255 lb (116 kg)

Career information
- High school: Long Branch (NJ)
- College: Catawba

Career history
- New York Giants (1945)
- Stats at Pro Football Reference

Amadeo “Army” Tomaini (February 5, 1918 – May 25, 2005) was an American football tackle. He played in eight games for the New York Giants in 1945.

His cousin Johnny Tomaini also played professional football.

He died on May 25, 2005, in Tallahassee, Florida at age 87.
