= Johnny Tomaini =

American football player (1902–1985)

Personal information
- Born: July 19, 1902; Long Branch, New Jersey
- Died: July 21, 1985 (aged 83); Spring Lake Heights, New Jersey
- Listed height: 6 ft 0 in (1.83 m)
- Listed weight: 192 lb (87 kg)

Career information
- High school: Long Branch (NJ); Asbury Park (NJ)
- College: Georgetown

Career history
- Orange Tornadoes (1929); Newark Tornadoes (1930); Brooklyn Dodgers (1930-1931)
- Stats at Pro Football Reference

John P. Tomaini (July 19, 1902 – July 21, 1985) was an American professional football player who played in the National Football League (NFL) for the Orange Tornadoes in 1929, the Newark Tornadoes in 1930, and the Brooklyn Dodgers from 1930 to 1931. Tomaini played in a total of 35 career games while making 21 starts.

His brother Army Tomaini also played professional football.
