= Seven Presidents Park =

Park in the United States

Coordinates: 40.31441°N 73.97701°W

Seven Presidents Park is an oceanfront park in the city of Long Branch, New Jersey, United States, maintained by the Monmouth County Park System. It is named after U.S. Presidents Ulysses S. Grant, Rutherford B. Hayes, James A. Garfield, Chester A. Arthur, Benjamin Harrison, William McKinley, and Woodrow Wilson, all of whom spent time in the area's resorts. President Grant declared Long Branch the nation's "Summer Capital" in 1869.

The park, which includes a mile of public beach and 38 acres (150,000 m^{2}) of land, allows swimming and surfing and also contains a snack bar, sheltered eating areas, a volleyball court, showers and changing facilities, a universal-access playground, a park and rink for skaters and skateboarders, and protected sand dunes. The inclusive playground, Tony's Place, won the 2011-12 NJ Park and Recreation Association's Excellence in Design Award. In addition, it hosts the Monmouth County Park System's annual Sprint Triathlon—combining swimming, cycling and running—in September. Seven Presidents Park charges an admissions fee from Memorial Day weekend to Labor Day weekend, although seasonal and multi-day passes are available.

Seven Presidents Park is a protected ecological habitat. The dunes offer a natural habitat for birds and plants, while protecting the beach against large storms. The Park System constantly plants erosion-fighting beach grass to reinforce the dunes and takes other protective measures to sustain the environment. Two threatened or endangered birds, the Least Tern and Piping Plover, now breed there.

Many other species of birds can be seen in the park. Seaducks, loons, gannets, gulls and alcids frequent the beaches. Especially common are the razorbill, the surf scoter, the black scoter, the long-tailed duck, the red-throated loon, the common loon, and the lesser black-backed gull. Brant geese, including the occasional black brant, can sometimes be seen at the athletic fields in foul weather. A flock of Bonaparte's gulls inhabits the park in winter. Farther inland, orange-crowned warblers, white-winged crossbills and red crossbills have been reported. Other birds found in the park have been white-winged gulls, little gulls, black-headed gulls, the sooty shearwater, the black-legged kittiwake, the parasitic jaeger, the vesper sparrow and the snow bunting.

In the late 19th century, Seven Presidents Park was the location of Long Branch businessman Nate Salsbury's Buffalo Bill Wild West Show, which included performers Buffalo Bill Cody, Annie Oakley and Chief Sitting Bull.

Locals have been surfing at Seven Presidents Park for decades as it was one of the first locations on the Jersey Shore that allowed surfing. The Kiernan Surfing Association, a group of local surfers, brokered a deal with the property owner so the surfers would not be pulled out of the water by the Long Branch police.
