= Long Branch, New Jersey =

City in Monmouth County, New Jersey, US

- City
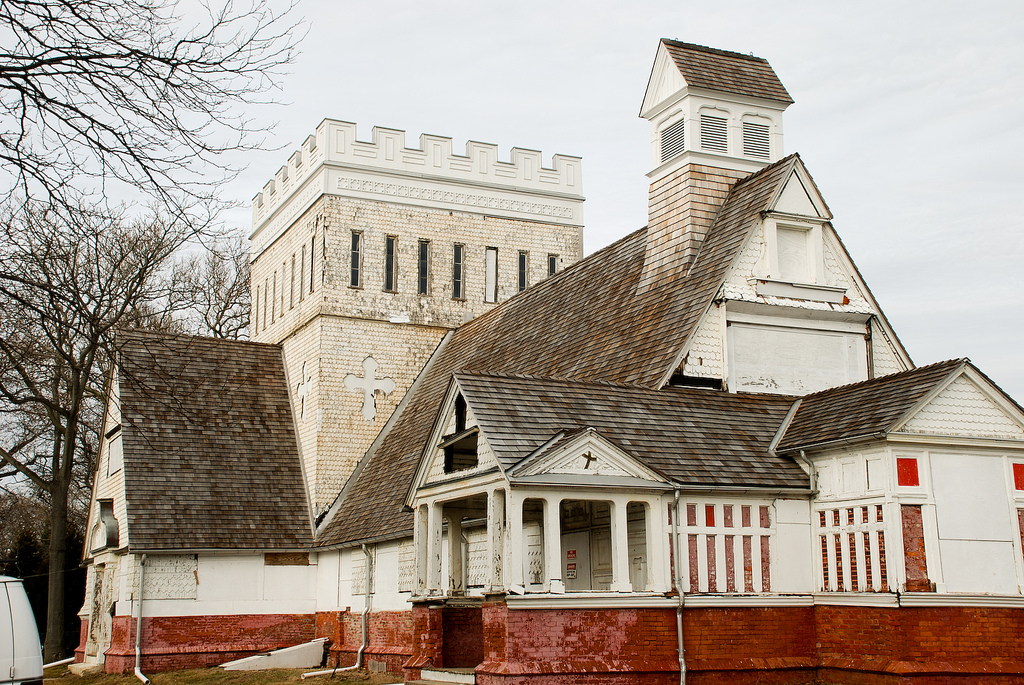
- Church of the Presidents

- Seal
- Nicknames: The First Seaside Resort, Friendly City
- Motto: Tide In
- Location of Long Branch in Monmouth County highlighted in red (left). Inset map: Location of Monmouth County in New Jersey highlighted in orange (right).

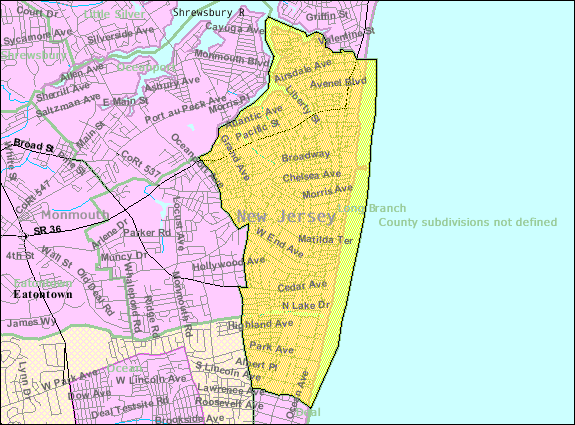
- Census Bureau map of Long Branch, New Jersey
- Interactive map of Long Branch, New Jersey
- Location in Monmouth County Location in New Jersey Location in the United States
- Coordinates: 40.295372°N 73.989899°W
- Country: United States
- State: New Jersey
- County: Monmouth
- Incorporated: April 11, 1867 (as Long Branch Commission)
- Reincorporated: April 8, 1903 (as city)
- Named for: location on the "long branch" of the Shrewsbury River

Government
  - Type: Faulkner Act (mayor–council)
  - Body: City Council
  - Mayor: John Pallone (term ends June 30, 2030)
  - Administrator: Lindsay DeAngelis (acting)
  - Municipal clerk: Amanda Caldwell

Area
  - Total: 6.29 sq mi (16.28 km^{2})
  - Land: 5.12 sq mi (13.27 km^{2})
  - Water: 1.16 sq mi (3.01 km^{2}) 18.49%
  - Rank: 250th of 565 in state 17th of 53 in county
- Elevation: 23 ft (7.0 m)

Population (2020)
  - Total: 31,667
  - Estimate (2023): 32,745
  - Rank: 74th of 565 in state 6th of 53 in county
  - Density: 6,180.1/sq mi (2,386.1/km^{2})
  - Rank: 86th of 565 in state 9th of 53 in county
- Time zone: UTC−05:00 (Eastern (EST))
  - Summer (DST): UTC−04:00 (Eastern (EDT))
- ZIP Code: 07740
- Area codes: 732/848
- FIPS code: 3402541310
- GNIS feature ID: 0885285
- Website: www.longbranch.org

Long Branch is a beachside city in Monmouth County, in the U.S. state of New Jersey. As of the 2020 United States census, the city's population was 31,667, an increase of 948 (+3.1%) from the 2010 census count of 30,719, which in turn reflected a decline of 621 (−2.0%) from the 31,340 counted in the 2000 census. As of the 2020 census, it was the 6th-most-populous municipality in Monmouth County and had the 74th-highest population of any municipality in New Jersey.

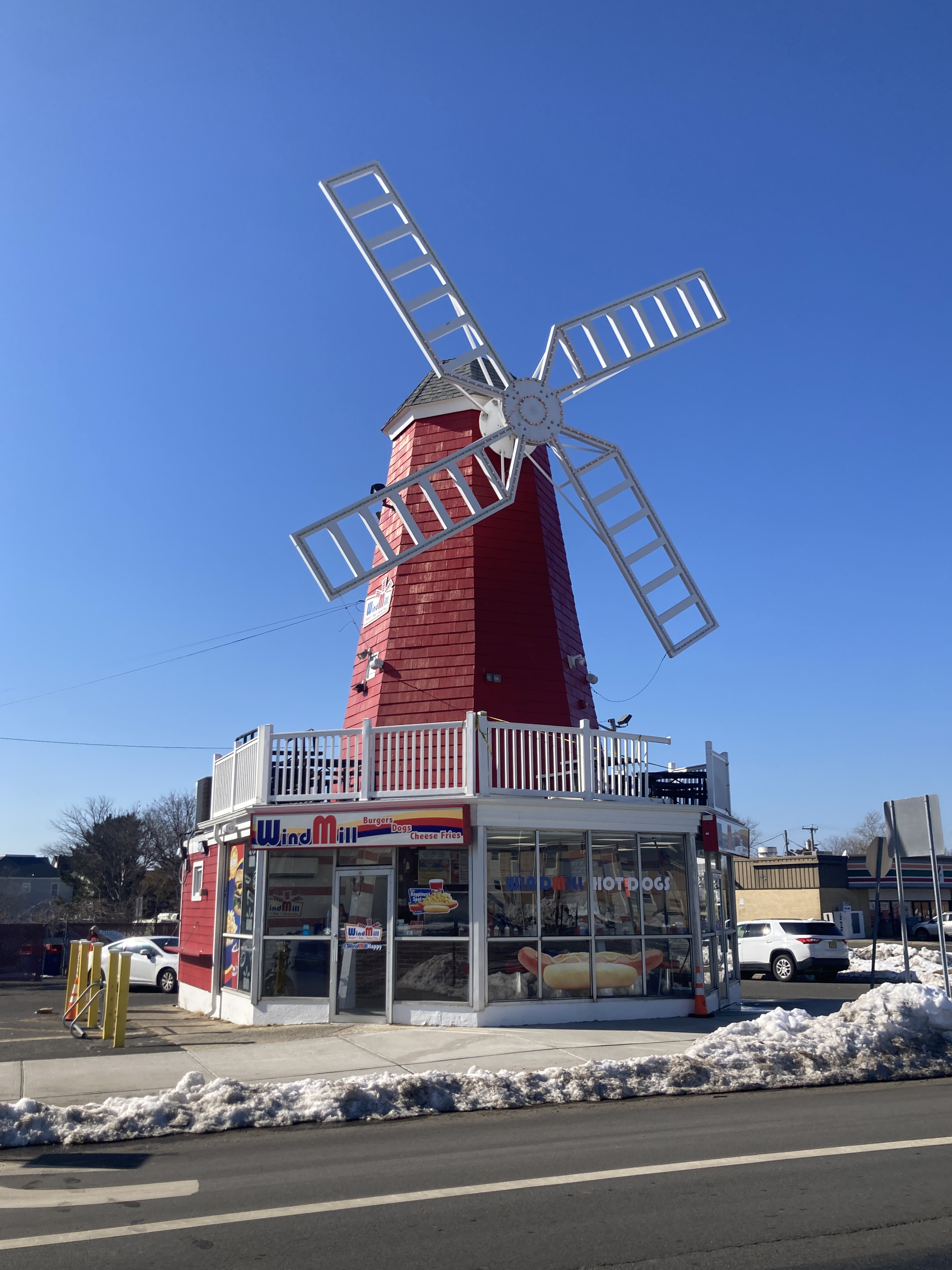
The Windmill Cafe on Ocean Avenue.

Long Branch was formed on April 11, 1867, as the Long Branch Commission, from portions of Ocean Township. Long Branch was incorporated as a city by an act of the New Jersey Legislature on April 8, 1903, based on the results of a referendum, replacing the Long Branch Commission.

== History ==
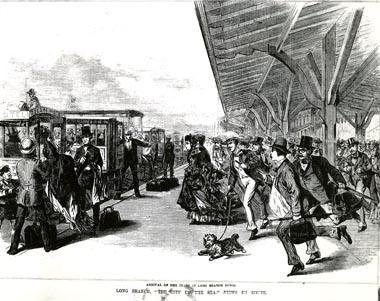
Long Branch station, 1873

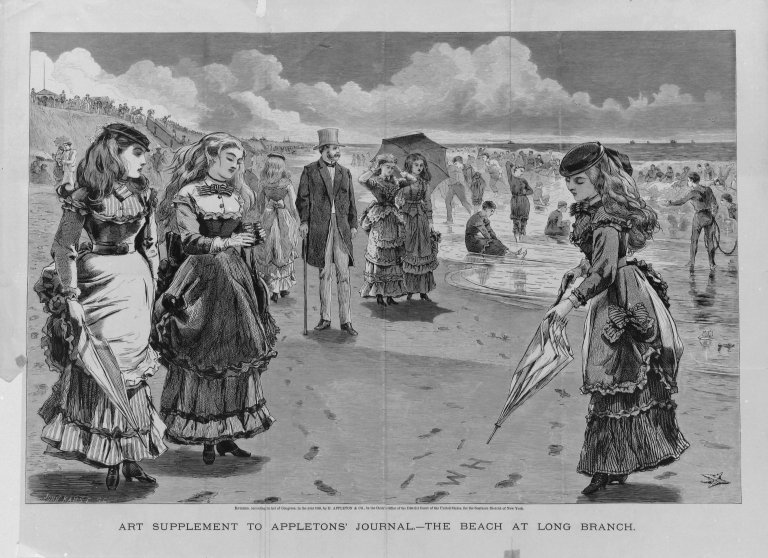
The Beach at Long Branch, an 1869 wood cut illustration by Winslow Homer

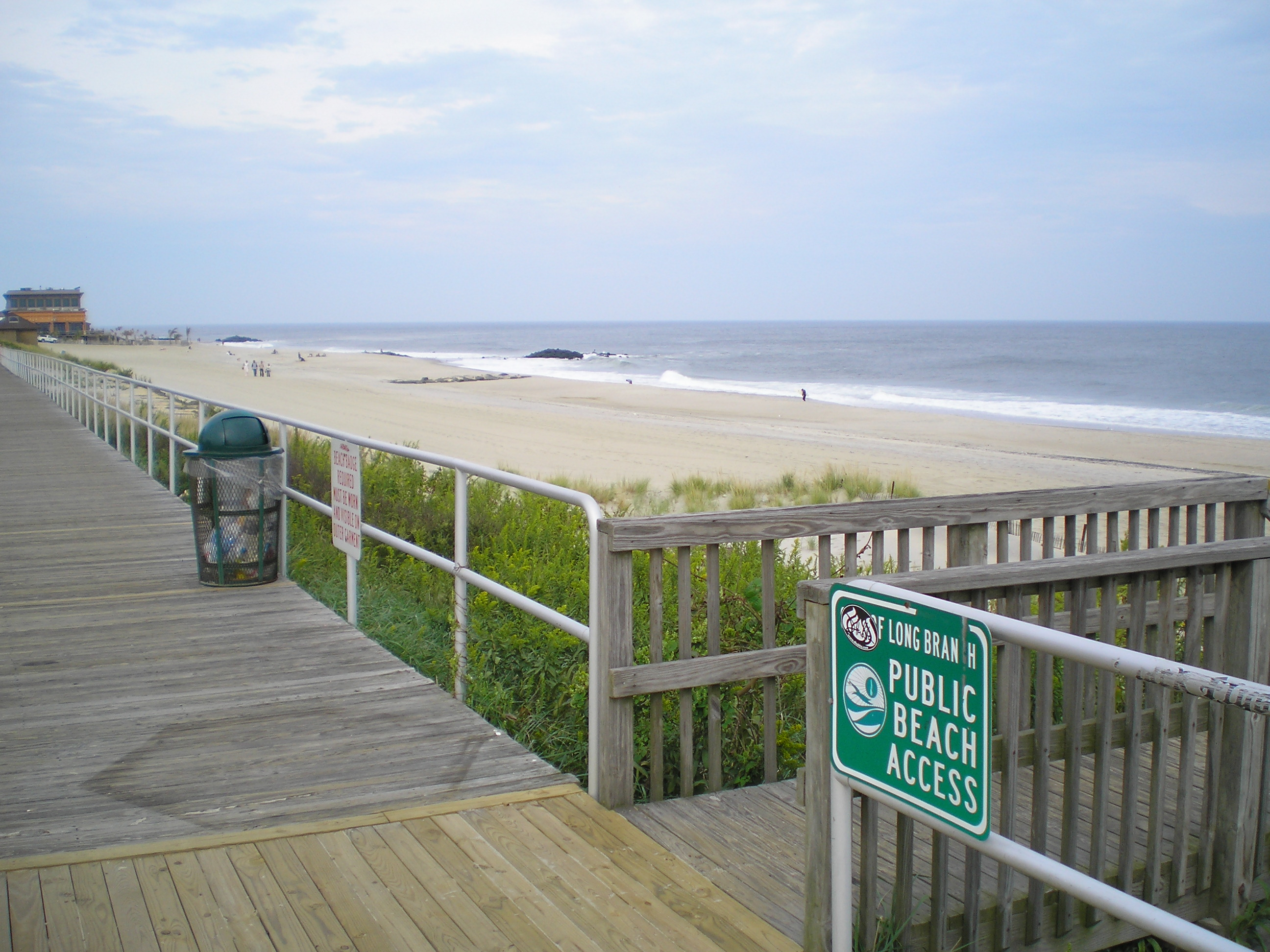
Long Branch Beach

Long Branch emerged as a beach resort town in the late 18th century, named for its location along a branch of the South Shrewsbury River. In the 19th century, theatrical performers of the day often gathered and performed there. It was visited by many Presidents during the Gilded Age, including Chester A. Arthur, James A. Garfield, Ulysses S. Grant, Benjamin Harrison, Rutherford B. Hayes, William McKinley, and Woodrow Wilson, along with President Donald Trump in the modern era. Seven Presidents Park, a park near the beach, is named in honor of the visits of the first seven of these presidents. The Church of the Presidents, where these same seven presidents worshiped, is the only structure left in Long Branch associated with them.

President Grant and his family summered at their beachfront cottage in Long Branch the first year of his presidency in 1869 and for most of the rest of Grant's life. During this time, Long Branch came to be called the "summer capital". President James A. Garfield was brought to Long Branch in the hope that the fresh air and quiet might aid his recovery after being shot on July 2, 1881, an incident that left the assassin's bullet lodged in his spine. He died here on September 19, 1881, at age 49. The Garfield Tea House, constructed from railroad ties that had been laid to carry Garfield's train, is in Elberon.

The famous Long Branch Saloon of the American Old West, located in Dodge City, Kansas, was given its name by its first owner, William Harris, who had moved west from Long Branch, New Jersey, his hometown.

Originally a resort town with a few hotels and large estates and many farms in the early 20th century, Long Branch grew in population. Italian, Irish and Jewish immigrants settled in during this period. During the 1930s, the city used government policies to enforce racial segregation against Blacks at local beaches, assigning all black applicants for beach passes to a single, segregated beach.

By the 1950s, Long Branch like many other towns had developed new residential spots and housing to make room for the growing population. Many of the former farms of Long Branch were transformed into residential suburbs. Many of the estates and a few old historic resorts (with the addition of many new ones) still remain.

In the early 20th century, Long Branch lost much of its activity as a theater spot. In addition, the opening of the Garden State Parkway in the mid-1950s allowed shore visitors to access points further south, which added to Long Branch's decline. The civil unrest of the 1960s caused riots in neighboring Asbury Park, and many fled the shore cities for the suburban towns west of the beach. Decades later, the older, more dilapidated parts of the resort town were condemned and redeveloped, in part by using eminent domain legislation.

Long Branch continues to be a popular resort area. Many people from New York City travel or settle into the area to escape the crowded city and enjoy Long Branch's beaches.

=== Hurricane Sandy ===
On October 29, 2012, Long Branch was one of many shore communities that were devastated by Hurricane Sandy. Although Sandy's winds were powerful, Long Branch's position between Long Beach Island and Sea Bright gave Long Branch a much larger wall of security because it could not be engulfed by surrounding waters. Despite this mainland advantage, there were still several instances of flooding in Long Branch during the storm. Many residents went without electricity for as long as two weeks. The boardwalk was destroyed; the city began rebuilding it in 2015, and it reopened in April 2016, making it the last boardwalk damaged by Sandy to be rebuilt.

== Geography ==
Long Branch takes its name from the "long branch" or south branch of the Shrewsbury River.

According to the U.S. Census Bureau, the city had a total area of 6.29 square miles (16.28 km^{2}), including 5.12 square miles (13.27 km^{2}) of land and 1.16 square miles (3.01 km^{2}) of water (18.49%).

The city borders the Monmouth County communities of Deal, Monmouth Beach, Ocean Township, Oceanport and West Long Branch.

=== Neighborhoods ===
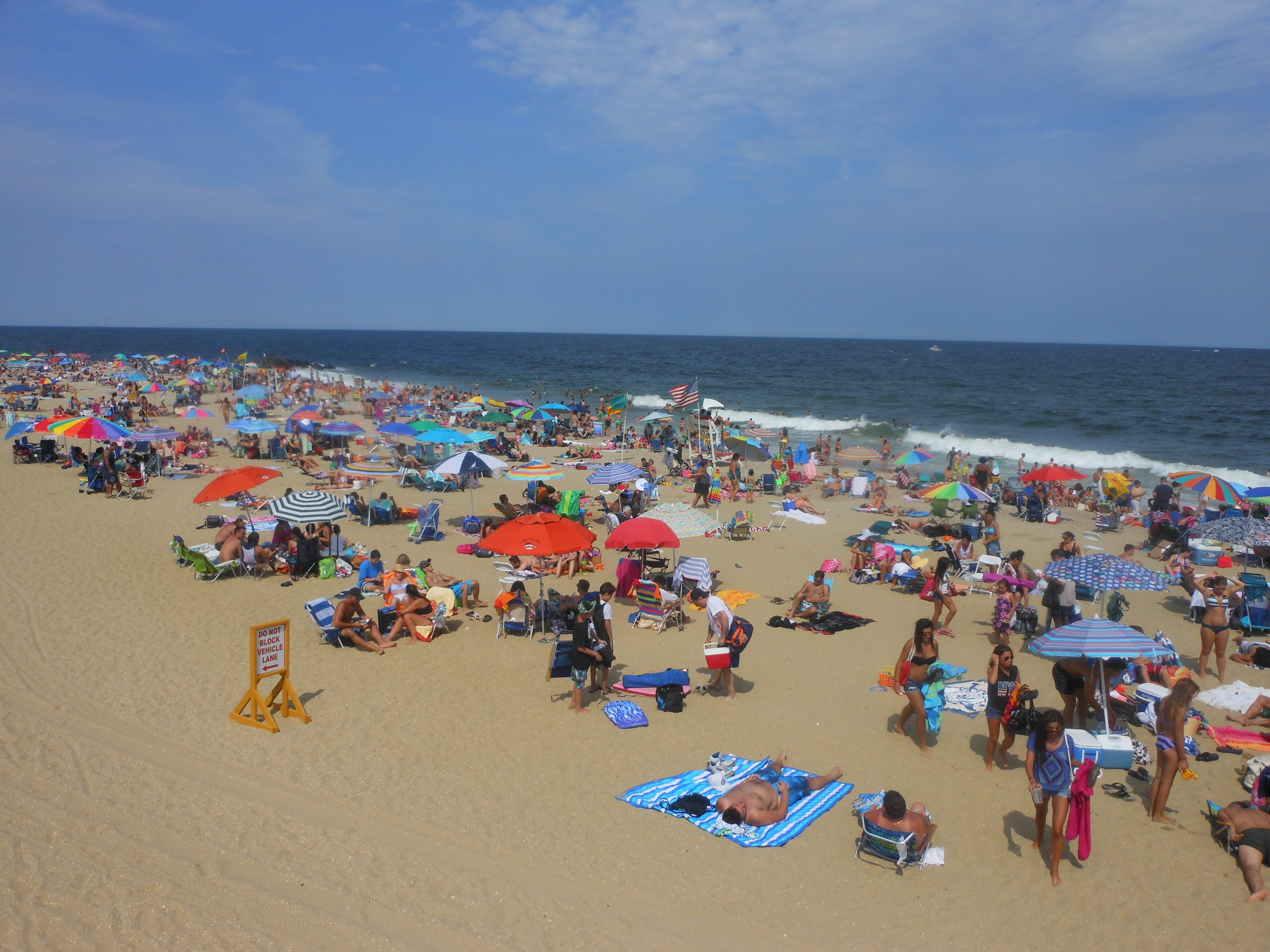
Long Branch Beach

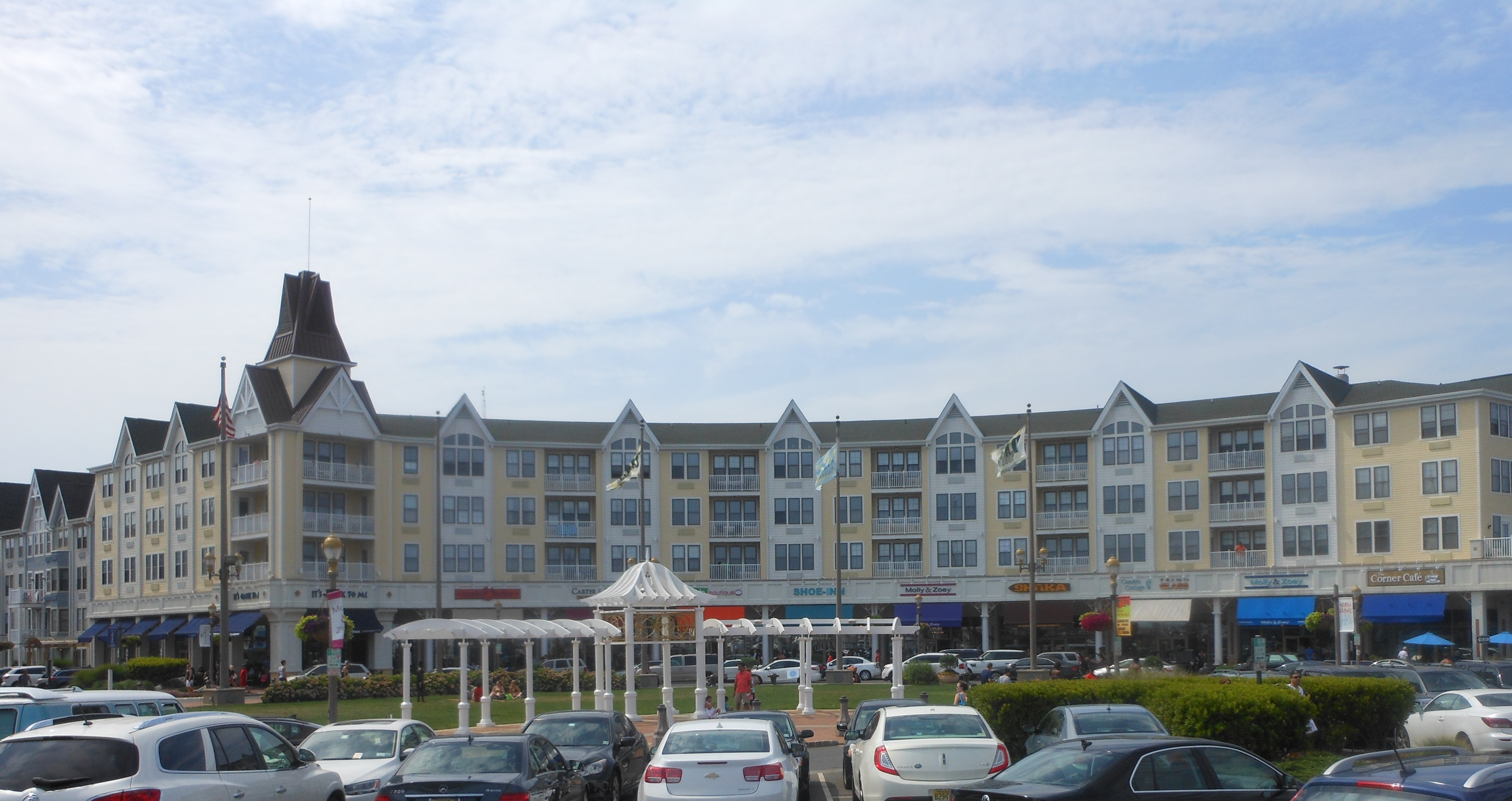
Pier Village at Long Branch

There are several distinct neighborhoods and areas in the City of Long Branch, each with its own character. Unincorporated communities, localities and place names located partially or completely within the city include Branchport, East Long Branch, Elberon (served as ZIP Code 07740), Hollywood, Kensington Park, North Long Branch, Pleasure Bay and West End. Other areas include North End (once known as "Atlanticville"), Beachfront North and South (including Pier Village, adjacent to the site of the former Long Branch Pier at the foot of Laird Street), Downtown and Uptown. As the city's redevelopment initiatives continue to expand, the lower Broadway area (a portion of the city's Downtown) will become an Arts District.

In years past, Long Branch was a major destination for beachgoers, along with Asbury Park, and enjoyed an upscale connotation with tourists. Long Branch is home to Seven Presidents Oceanfront Park, named for the United States presidents who visited the fashionable resort town, including Ulysses S. Grant, Chester A. Arthur, Rutherford Hayes, Benjamin Harrison, William McKinley, Woodrow Wilson and James Garfield.

Long Branch's fame as the Nation's First Seaside Resort waned in the years following World War II. The defining moment marking the end of this era occurred on June 8, 1987, when the largest fire in the history of the city destroyed the landmark amusement pier and adjoining Haunted Mansion, "Kid's World" Amusement Park and other businesses.

=== Climate ===
According to the Köppen climate classification system, Long Branch has a humid subtropical climate (Cfa). Cfa climates are characterized by all months having an average temperature above 32.0 °F (0.0 °C), at least four months with an average temperature at or above 50.0 °F (10.0 °C), at least one month with an average temperature at or above 71.6 °F (22.0 °C) and no significant precipitation difference between seasons. Although most summer days are slightly humid with a cooling afternoon sea breeze in Long Branch, episodes of heat and high humidity can occur with heat index values above 104 °F (40 °C). Since 1981, the highest air temperature was 100.6 °F (38.1 °C) on August 9, 2001, and the highest daily average mean dew point was 77.7 °F (25.4 °C) on August 13, 2016, and July 19, 2019. July is the peak in thunderstorm activity and the average wettest month is August. Since 1981, the wettest calendar day was 5.82 inches (148 mm) on August 27, 2011. During the winter months, the average annual extreme minimum air temperature is 3.9 °F (−15.6 °C). Since 1981, the coldest air temperature was −5.9 °F (−21.1 °C) on January 22, 1984. Episodes of extreme cold and wind can occur with wind chill values below −6 °F (−21 °C). The average seasonal (November–April) snowfall total is 18 to 24 inches (46 to 61 cm) and the average snowiest month is February which corresponds with the annual peak in nor'easter activity.

Climate data for Long Branch, New Jersey (1991–2020 normals, extremes 1907–present)
Month	Jan	Feb	Mar	Apr	May	Jun	Jul	Aug	Sep	Oct	Nov	Dec	Year
Record high °F (°C)	76 (24)	78 (26)	87 (31)	92 (33)	97 (36)	99 (37)	106 (41)	101 (38)	98 (37)	95 (35)	83 (28)	74 (23)	106 (41)
Mean daily maximum °F (°C)	41.8 (5.4)	43.1 (6.2)	49.2 (9.6)	58.9 (14.9)	68.3 (20.2)	77.8 (25.4)	83.5 (28.6)	81.8 (27.7)	76.2 (24.6)	65.5 (18.6)	55.6 (13.1)	46.9 (8.3)	62.4 (16.9)
Daily mean °F (°C)	33.3 (0.7)	34.5 (1.4)	40.8 (4.9)	50.0 (10.0)	59.5 (15.3)	69.3 (20.7)	75.1 (23.9)	73.6 (23.1)	67.6 (19.8)	56.2 (13.4)	46.4 (8.0)	38.4 (3.6)	53.7 (12.1)
Mean daily minimum °F (°C)	24.8 (−4.0)	25.9 (−3.4)	32.3 (0.2)	41.0 (5.0)	50.8 (10.4)	60.9 (16.1)	66.8 (19.3)	65.4 (18.6)	58.9 (14.9)	46.9 (8.3)	37.3 (2.9)	30.0 (−1.1)	45.1 (7.3)
Record low °F (°C)	−8 (−22)	−12 (−24)	4 (−16)	12 (−11)	29 (−2)	37 (3)	45 (7)	43 (6)	32 (0)	24 (−4)	13 (−11)	−8 (−22)	−12 (−24)
Average precipitation inches (mm)	4.20 (107)	3.31 (84)	4.33 (110)	3.91 (99)	4.13 (105)	4.34 (110)	4.40 (112)	6.27 (159)	4.33 (110)	4.71 (120)	3.82 (97)	4.78 (121)	52.53 (1,334)
Average snowfall inches (cm)	5.2 (13)	1.8 (4.6)	1.6 (4.1)	trace	0 (0)	0 (0)	0 (0)	0 (0)	0 (0)	0 (0)	0.1 (0.25)	1.6 (4.1)	10.3 (26.05)
Average precipitation days (≥ 0.01 in)	11.0	8.8	9.8	11.2	11.7	10.4	9.3	9.0	8.8	9.9	9.2	10.4	119.5
Average snowy days (≥ 0.01 in)	2	1	1	0	0	0	0	0	0	0	0	1	5
Source: NOAA

Climate data for Sandy Hook, NJ Ocean Water Temperature (16 N Long Branch)
Month	Jan	Feb	Mar	Apr	May	Jun	Jul	Aug	Sep	Oct	Nov	Dec	Year
Daily mean °F (°C)	37 (3)	36 (2)	40 (4)	46 (8)	55 (13)	62 (17)	69 (21)	72 (22)	68 (20)	59 (15)	51 (11)	43 (6)	53 (12)
Source: NOAA

=== Ecology ===
According to the A. W. Kuchler U.S. potential natural vegetation types, Long Branch would have a dominant vegetation type of Appalachian oak (104) with a dominant vegetation form of Eastern Hardwood Forest (25). The plant hardiness zone is 7a with an average annual extreme minimum air temperature of 3.9 °F (−15.6 °C). The average date of first spring leaf-out is March 23 and fall color typically peaks in early-November.

== Economy ==
Portions of the city are part of a joint Urban Enterprise Zone (UEZ) with Asbury Park, one of 32 zones covering 37 municipalities statewide. The city was selected in 1994 as one of a group of 10 zones added to participate in the program. In addition to other benefits to encourage employment and investment within the UEZ, shoppers can take advantage of a reduced 3.3125% sales tax rate (half of the 6 5/8% rate charged statewide) at eligible merchants. Established in November 1994, the city's Urban Enterprise Zone status expires in November 2025.

=== Development ===
Broadway Center is a planned entertainment and commercial hub of Long Branch, as envisioned by the City Government and Thompson Design Group, who created the Master Plan for the city. This complex is planned to offer retail shops, cafes, bars, restaurants and two performing arts theaters as well as 500 new residences sitting atop a 1,500 car parking garage. It will be designed by the architectural firms of Hellmuth, Obata and Kassabaum (HOK).

In June 2013, the city approved designation of the area around its train station as a transit village, which can bring incentives for revitalization and denser development.

There are several mid-rise buildings lining the oceanfront. In December 2013 another 12-story residential project was approved.

The Broadway Arts Center project stalled and sat in limbo for nearly twenty years. The project was taken over by Kushner Companies.

== Demographics ==
Historical population
Census	Pop.	Note	%±
1880	3,833		—
1890	7,231		88.7%
1900	8,872		22.7%
1910	13,298		49.9%
1920	13,521		1.7%
1930	18,399		36.1%
1940	17,408		−5.4%
1950	23,090		32.6%
1960	26,228		13.6%
1970	31,774		21.1%
1980	29,819		−6.2%
1990	28,658		−3.9%
2000	31,340		9.4%
2010	30,719		−2.0%
2020	31,667		3.1%
2023 (est.)	32,745		3.4%
Population sources: 1880–1920 1880–1890; 1890–1910 1880–1930; 1940–2000 2000; 2010 2020

=== 2020 census ===
As of the 2020 census, Long Branch had a population of 31,667. The median age was 37.3 years. 22.0% of residents were under the age of 18 and 15.4% of residents were 65 years of age or older. For every 100 females there were 99.2 males, and for every 100 females age 18 and over there were 95.7 males age 18 and over.

100.0% of residents lived in urban areas, while 0.0% lived in rural areas.

There were 12,391 households in Long Branch, of which 29.3% had children under the age of 18 living in them. Of all households, 37.5% were married-couple households, 22.3% were households with a male householder and no spouse or partner present, and 32.2% were households with a female householder and no spouse or partner present. About 32.6% of all households were made up of individuals and 13.0% had someone living alone who was 65 years of age or older.

There were 14,944 housing units, of which 17.1% were vacant. The homeowner vacancy rate was 2.3% and the rental vacancy rate was 6.2%.

Racial composition as of the 2020 census
Race	Number	Percent
White	14,501	45.8%
Black or African American	3,403	10.7%
American Indian and Alaska Native	444	1.4%
Asian	612	1.9%
Native Hawaiian and Other Pacific Islander	14	0.0%
Some other race	7,388	23.3%
Two or more races	5,305	16.8%
Hispanic or Latino (of any race)	10,332	32.6%

=== 2010 census ===
The 2010 United States census counted 30,719 people, 11,753 households, and 6,876 families in the city. The population density was 5,824.4 per square mile (2,248.8/km^{2}). There were 14,170 housing units at an average density of 2,686.7 per square mile (1,037.3/km^{2}). The racial makeup was 65.30% (20,060) White, 14.21% (4,364) Black or African American, 0.55% (170) Native American, 2.13% (655) Asian, 0.08% (24) Pacific Islander, 13.24% (4,067) from other races, and 4.49% (1,379) from two or more races. Hispanic or Latino of any race were 28.07% (8,624) of the population.

Of the 11,753 households, 26.3% had children under the age of 18; 36.2% were married couples living together; 15.6% had a female householder with no husband present and 41.5% were non-families. Of all households, 31.0% were made up of individuals and 9.6% had someone living alone who was 65 years of age or older. The average household size was 2.60 and the average family size was 3.23.

21.7% of the population were under the age of 18, 12.2% from 18 to 24, 31.1% from 25 to 44, 23.8% from 45 to 64, and 11.3% who were 65 years of age or older. The median age was 33.8 years. For every 100 females, the population had 100.3 males. For every 100 females ages 18 and older there were 98.3 males.

The Census Bureau's 2006–2010 American Community Survey showed that (in 2010 inflation-adjusted dollars) median household income was $52,792 (with a margin of error of +/− $2,549) and the median family income was $56,778 (+/− $4,202). Males had a median income of $36,404 (+/− $3,363) versus $33,397 (+/− $4,036) for females. The per capita income for the borough was $30,381 (+/− $2,212). About 11.5% of families and 14.5% of the population were below the poverty line, including 26.7% of those under age 18 and 9.6% of those age 65 or over.

=== 2000 census ===
As of the 2000 United States census there were 31,340 people, 12,594 households, and 7,248 families residing in the city. The population density was 6,008.6 inhabitants per square mile (2,319.9/km^{2}). There were 13,983 housing units at an average density of 2,680.9 per square mile (1,035.1/km^{2}). The racial makeup of the city was 68.03% White, 18.66% African American, 0.36% Native American, 1.64% Asian, 0.05% Pacific Islander, 7.08% from other races, and 4.19% from two or more races. Hispanic or Latino of any race were 20.67% of the population.

There were 12,594 households, out of which 27.0% had children under the age of 18 living with them, 36.9% were married couples living together, 15.9% had a female householder with no husband present, and 42.4% were non-families. 34.1% of all households were made up of individuals, and 10.5% had someone living alone who was 65 years of age or older. The average household size was 2.47 and the average family size was 3.19.

In the city the population was spread out, with 23.8% under the age of 18, 10.2% from 18 to 24, 32.4% from 25 to 44, 20.8% from 45 to 64, and 12.9% who were 65 years of age or older. The median age was 35 years. For every 100 females, there were 94.3 males. For every 100 females age 18 and over, there were 91.6 males.

The median income for a household in the city was $38,651, and the median income for a family was $42,825. Males had a median income of $37,383 versus $27,026 for females. The per capita income for the city was $20,532. About 13.9% of families and 16.7% of the population were below the poverty line, including 23.3% of those under age 18 and 13.3% of those age 65 or over.

== Government ==
=== Local government ===
Long Branch is governed under the Mayor-Council (Plan A) form of municipal government under the Faulkner Act, enacted by direct petition as of July 1, 1966. The city is one of 71 of New Jersey's 564 municipalities that use this form of government. The governing body is comprised of the Mayor and the five-member City Council, whose members are elected at-large on a non-partisan basis in the May municipal elections to serve concurrent four-year terms of office.

As of 2026, the Mayor of Long Branch is John Pallone. Members of the City Council are Council President Glen Rassas, Council Vice President David G. Brown II, Anita Voogt, Paulo Barateiro, and Marcos Zalta. The mayor and city council members serve concurrent terms of office ending on June 30, 2030.

In February 1966, a nearly 3–1 margin of voters supported a proposal promoted by the Better Government League, which abolished the city's council-manager ward-based system that had six members from wards and three at-large and replaced it with a wholly at-large city council with a mayor-council system under the Faulkner Act and an appointed business administrator.

=== Federal, state, and county representation ===
Long Branch is located in the 6th Congressional District and is part of New Jersey's 11th state legislative district.

For the 119th United States Congress, New Jersey's 6th congressional district is represented by Frank Pallone (D, Long Branch). New Jersey is represented in the United States Senate by Democrats Cory Booker (Newark, term ends 2027) and Andy Kim (Moorestown, term ends 2031).

For the 2026–2027 session, the 11th legislative district of the New Jersey Legislature is represented in the New Jersey Senate by Vin Gopal (D, Long Branch) and in the General Assembly by Margie Donlon (D, Ocean Township) and Luanne Peterpaul (D, Long Branch).

Monmouth County is governed by a Board of County Commissioners composed of five members who are elected at-large to serve three-year terms of office on a staggered basis, with either one or two seats up for election each year as part of the November general election. At an annual reorganization meeting held in the beginning of January, the board selects one of its members to serve as director and another as deputy director.

As of 2026, Monmouth County's Commissioners are Director Thomas A. Arnone (R, Neptune City, 2028),Deputy Director Nick DiRocco (R, Wall Township, 2028), Susan M. Kiley (R, Hazlet Township, 2027), Erik Anderson (R, Shrewsbury, 2026), and Ross F. Licitra (R, Marlboro Township, 2026).

Constitutional officers elected on a countywide basis are Clerk Christine Giordano Hanlon (R, 2030; Ocean Township), Sheriff Shaun Golden (R, 2028; Howell Township) and Surrogate Maureen Raisch (R, 2026; Middletown Township).

=== Politics ===
United States presidential election results for Long Branch
Year	Republican		Democratic		Third party(ies)	
Year	No.	%	No.	%	No.	%
2024	4,673	47.00%	5,121	51.50%	149	1.50%
2020	4,375	39.78%	6,499	59.10%	123	1.12%
2016	3,641	38.34%	5,589	58.85%	267	2.81%
2012	2,897	34.49%	5,421	64.54%	81	0.96%
2008	3,600	36.48%	6,171	62.53%	98	0.99%
2004	4,001	40.73%	5,724	58.27%	99	1.01%
2000	2,593	28.84%	6,008	66.83%	389	4.33%
1996	2,414	28.03%	5,532	64.24%	666	7.73%
1992	3,361	33.42%	5,305	52.75%	1,391	13.83%

As of March 2011, there were a total of 13,442 registered voters in Long Branch, of which 4,293 (31.9%) were registered as Democrats, 1,783 (13.3%) were registered as Republicans and 7,358 (54.7%) were registered as Unaffiliated. There were 8 voters registered as Libertarians or Greens.

Gubernatorial election results for Long Branch
Year	Republican		Democratic		Third party(ies)	
Year	No.	%	No.	%	No.	%
2025	3,480	43.99%	4,370	55.24%	61	0.77%
2021	2,711	46.06%	3,107	52.79%	68	1.16%
2017	1,989	38.50%	3,079	59.60%	98	1.90%
2013	2,621	57.38%	1,876	41.07%	71	1.55%
2009	2,523	45.01%	2,714	48.42%	368	6.57%
2005	2,090	35.70%	3,504	59.86%	260	4.44%

In the 2012 presidential election, Democrat Barack Obama received 64.5% of the vote (5,421 cast), ahead of Republican Mitt Romney with 34.5% (2,897 votes), and other candidates with 1.0% (81 votes), among the 8,470 ballots cast by the city's 14,289 registered voters (71 ballots were spoiled), for a turnout of 59.3%. In the 2008 presidential election, Democrat Barack Obama received 61.2% of the vote (6,171 cast), ahead of Republican John McCain with 35.7% (3,600 votes) and other candidates with 1.0% (98 votes), among the 10,090 ballots cast by the city's 14,433 registered voters, for a turnout of 69.9%. In the 2004 presidential election, Democrat John Kerry received 58.0% of the vote (5,724 ballots cast), outpolling Republican George W. Bush with 40.5% (4,001 votes) and other candidates with 0.7% (99 votes), among the 9,870 ballots cast by the city's 14,563 registered voters, for a turnout percentage of 67.8.

In the 2013 gubernatorial election, Republican Chris Christie received 57.4% of the vote (2,621 cast), ahead of Democrat Barbara Buono with 41.1% (1,876 votes), and other candidates with 1.6% (71 votes), among the 4,677 ballots cast by the city's 14,129 registered voters (109 ballots were spoiled), for a turnout of 33.1%. In the 2009 gubernatorial election, Democrat Jon Corzine received 48.1% of the vote (2,714 ballots cast), ahead of Republican Chris Christie with 44.7% (2,523 votes), Independent Chris Daggett with 5.7% (320 votes) and other candidates with 0.9% (48 votes), among the 5,645 ballots cast by the city's 13,812 registered voters, yielding a 40.9% turnout.

United States Senate election results for Long Branch1
Year	Republican		Democratic		Third party(ies)	
Year	No.	%	No.	%	No.	%
2024	4,104	44.82%	4,803	52.46%	249	2.72%
2018	2,683	37.47%	4,246	59.29%	232	3.24%
2012	2,079	28.83%	5,012	69.50%	120	1.66%
2006	2,171	38.72%	3,303	58.91%	133	2.37%

United States Senate election results for Long Branch2
Year	Republican		Democratic		Third party(ies)	
Year	No.	%	No.	%	No.	%
2020	4,061	37.80%	6,382	59.41%	300	2.79%
2014	1,482	35.19%	2,671	63.41%	59	1.40%
2013	1,184	37.34%	1,951	61.53%	36	1.14%
2008	2,984	33.75%	5,593	63.25%	265	3.00%

== Public safety ==
Long Branch Police Department

Jurisdictional structure
- Legal jurisdiction: Municipal

Operational structure
- Headquarters: Long Branch, New Jersey
- Sworn members: 88 as of 2021
- Agency executive: Jorge Silverio, Director of Public Safety

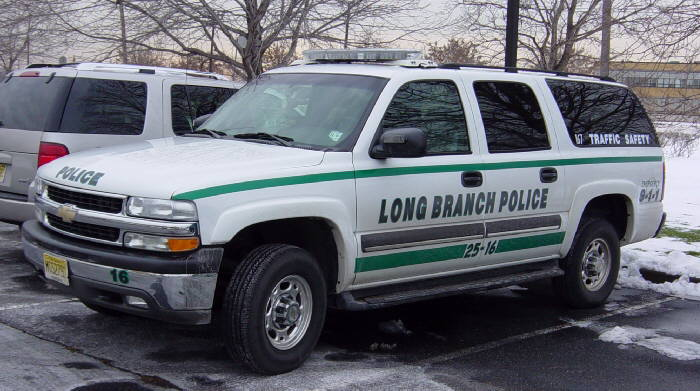
A Long Branch Police Department vehicle

The Long Branch Department of Public Safety consists of the Long Branch Police Department (LBPD), the Long Branch Fire Department and the Office of Emergency Management. The LBPD did not have a police chief between 1970 and 2017, with the Director of Public Safety being directly responsible for the department. In January of 2018, Mayor Adam Schneider appointed Jason Roebuck, the then-Public Safety Director, to the position of Chief of Police. In July 2021, the position was eliminated after Roebuck retired. Since then, the position of Public Safety Director has been restored by current Mayor John Pallone. As of October 2026, the Long Branch Director of Public Safety is Jorge Silverio.

On November 20, 1997, Long Branch Police Department Detective Sergeant Patrick A. King was killed by gunshot while ordering food at a Chinese restaurant. The killer led law enforcement on a 60-mile (97 km) chase which ended in his suicide.

== Education ==
The Long Branch Public Schools serves children in pre-kindergarten through twelfth grade. The district is one of 31 former Abbott districts statewide that were established pursuant to the decision by the New Jersey Supreme Court in Abbott v. Burke which are now referred to as "SDA Districts" based on the requirement for the state to cover all costs for school building and renovation projects in these districts under the supervision of the New Jersey Schools Development Authority. All Long Branch Public Schools are free, including the district's preschool programs which are full-day and accommodate children ages 3–5 years old. Long Branch schools offer free breakfast each morning for the students. In addition, Long Branch Public Schools provide free summer programs for most of the summer.

As of the 2022–23 school year, the district, comprised of eight schools, had an enrollment of 5,494 students and 495.0 classroom teachers (on an FTE basis), for a student–teacher ratio of 11.1:1. Schools in the district (with 2022–23 enrollment data from the National Center for Education Statistics) are Lenna W. Conrow School (with 298 students; in grades PreK–K), Joseph M. Ferraina Early Childhood Learning Center (291; PreK–K), Morris Avenue School (310; PreK–K), Amerigo A. Anastasia School (587; 1–5), George L. Catrambone Elementary School (712; 1–5), Gregory School (600; 1–5), Long Branch Middle School (1,108; 6–8), Long Branch High School (1,548; 9–12) and Audrey W. Clark School / The Academy of Alternative Programs, an alternative education program.

George L. Catrambone Elementary School was constructed at a total cost over $40 million for a facility that was designed to house 800 students in a facility covering 109,000 square feet (10,100 m^{2}) for which construction began in 2012. With the start of the 2014–2015 school year, a realignment of the district closed West End School, converted Morris Avenue School for early childhood use and repurposed Audrey W. Clark School for alternative education.

Declining attendance led the Roman Catholic Diocese of Trenton to close the K–8 Holy Trinity School in June 2006.

== Media ==
WRLB "Radio Long Branch" signed-on June 1, 1960, at 107.1 FM. Since December 1996 the call letters have been WWZY.

== Transportation ==
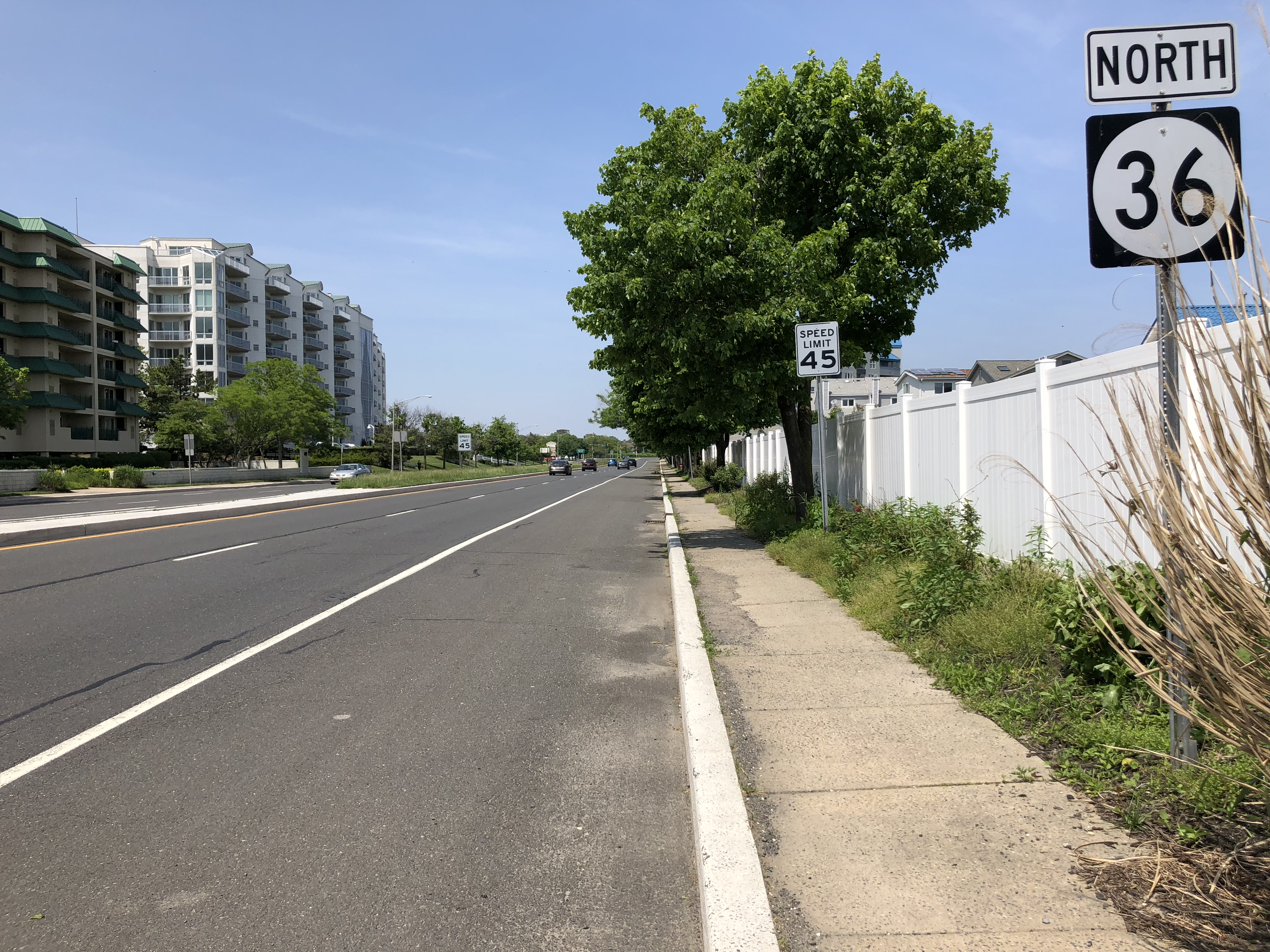
Route 36 in Long Branch

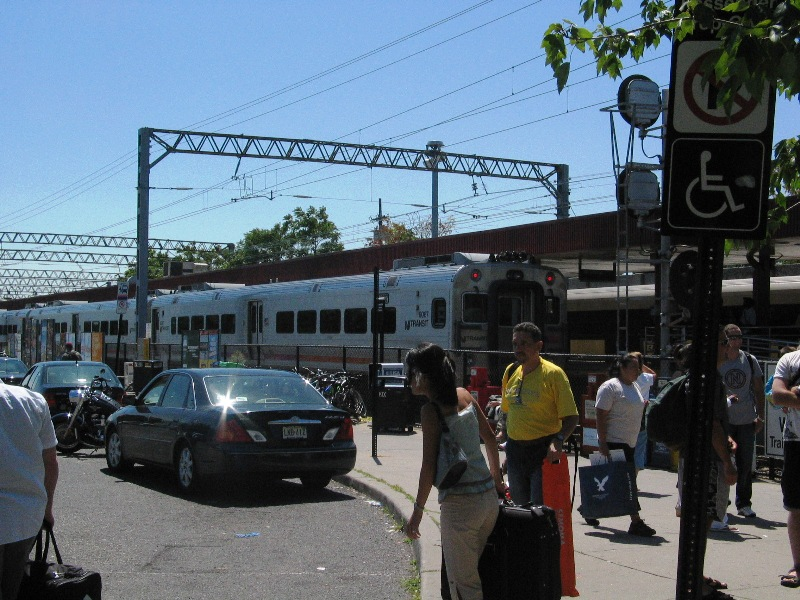
Long Branch station, which is served by NJ Transit's North Jersey Coast Line

=== Roads and highways ===
As of 2010, the city had a total of 89.49 miles (144.02 km) of roadways, of which 80.10 miles (128.91 km) were maintained by the municipality, 6.26 miles (10.07 km) by Monmouth County and 3.13 miles (5.04 km) by the New Jersey Department of Transportation.

Route 36 and Route 71 are the most significant highways that pass through the city.

=== Public transportation ===
Long Branch is connected to New York City and Northern New Jersey via NJ Transit commuter train service running on the North Jersey Coast Line. The Long Branch station located three blocks away from the beach, marks the end of electrified trackage, where passengers continuing south must change to diesel-powered trains. A second station is located at Elberon, just north of the borough of Deal. In the past there were stops in the West End neighborhood and on Broadway, but they were closed to reduce travel time to New York City.

Local bus transportation is provided by NJ Transit on the 831 and 837 routes. Transportation to New York City is provided by Academy Bus on its Route 36 and Shore Points routes.

== Notable people ==
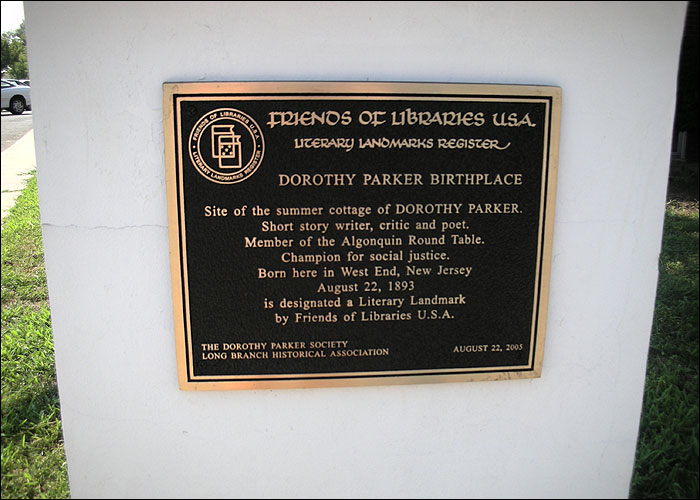
Birthplace of Dorothy Parker

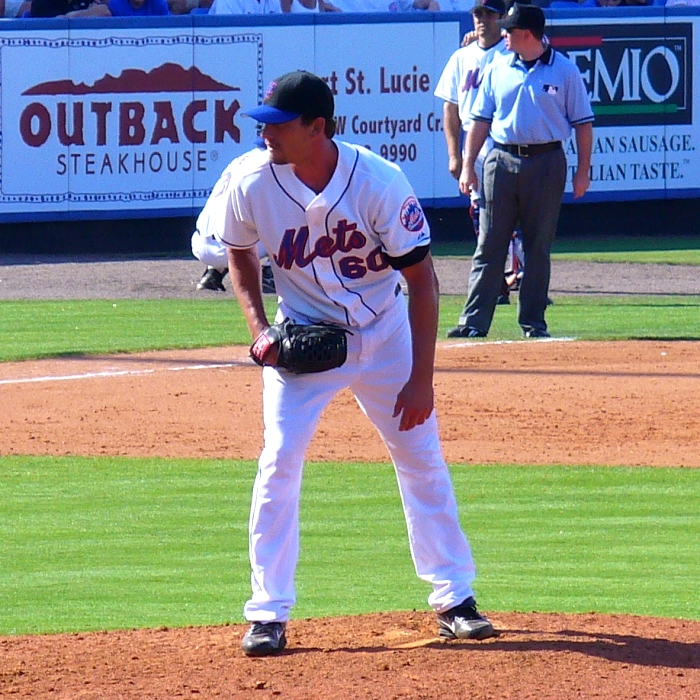
Scott Schoeneweis

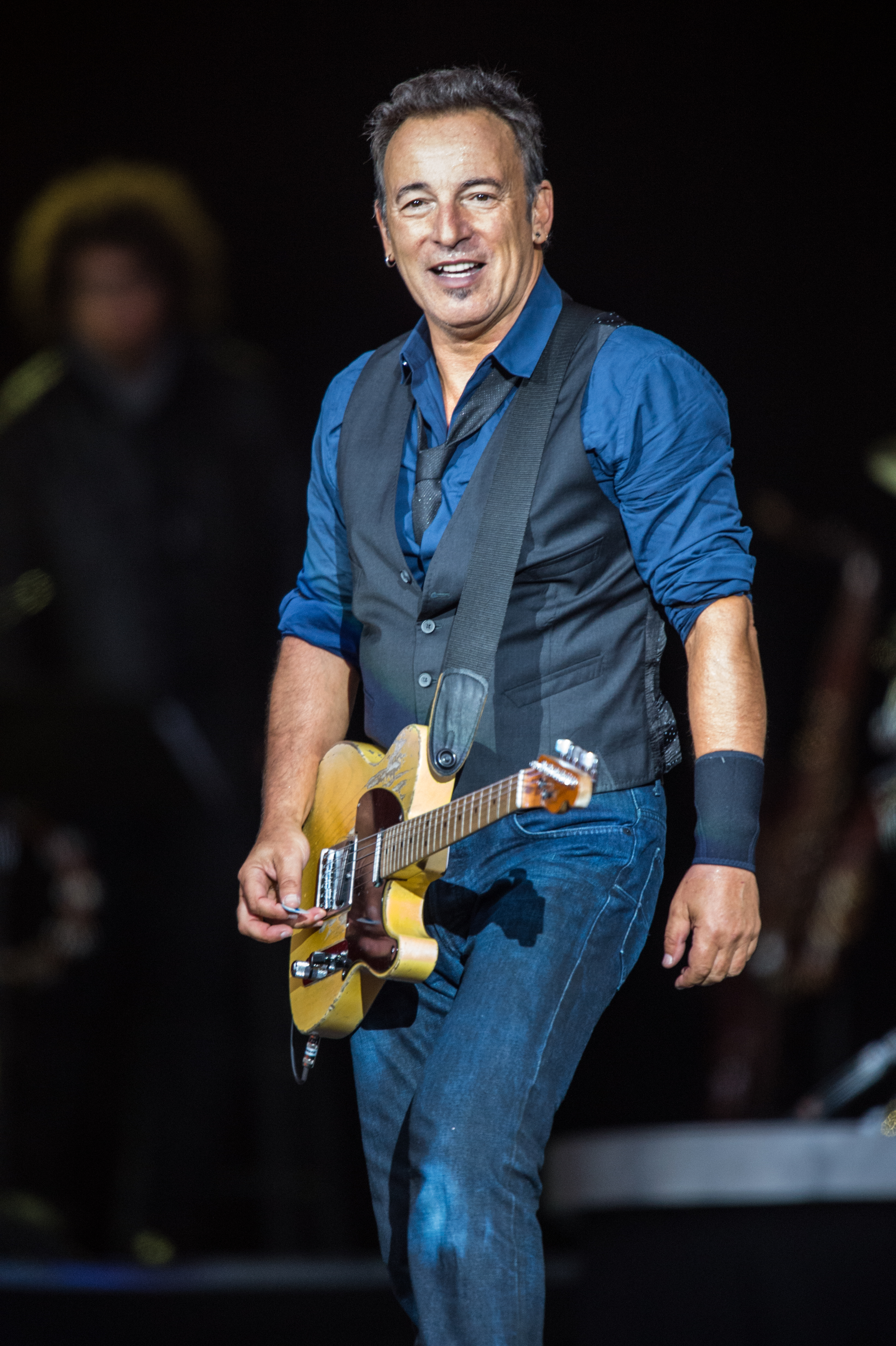
Bruce Springsteen

People who were born in, residents of, or otherwise closely associated with Long Branch include:

- M. H. Abrams (1912–2015), literary critic, known for works on romanticism
- Aida de Acosta (1884–1962), socialite and the first woman to fly a powered aircraft solo
- Louis R. Aikins (1926–1982), politician who served in the New Jersey General Assembly from 1968 to 1970
- Richard Anderson (1926–2017), best known for his role as Oscar Goldman, in both The Six Million Dollar Man and The Bionic Woman TV series and subsequent TV movies
- Paul Baerwald (1871–1961), banker and philanthropist
- John Beake (born 1938), retired American football executive who served as general manager of the Denver Broncos of the National Football League from 1985 to 1998
- Arthur Hornbui Bell (1891–1973), attorney who was the Grand Dragon of the Ku Klux Klan in New Jersey
- Joe Benning (born 1956), member of the Vermont Senate who has represented the Caledonia District since 2011
- Clint Black (born 1962), country music performer
- Jeff Blumenkrantz (born 1965), actor, composer and lyricist
- Clara Bloodgood (1870–1907), stage actress
- Dorothy Borg (1902–1993), historian specializing in American-East Asian relations
- Joe Bravo (born 1971), thoroughbred racing jockey
- MarShon Brooks (born 1989), basketball player for the Brooklyn Nets
- Frank Budd (1939–2014), wide receiver in the NFL for the Philadelphia Eagles and the Washington Redskins who once held the world record in the 100-yard dash
- John Cannon (born 1960), former defensive end who played nine seasons for the Tampa Bay Buccaneers
- Rick Cerone (born 1954), former Yankee catcher who played for eight major league baseball teams, and was part of the New York Yankees for seven years
- Jo Champa (born 1968), actress, producer and model
- June Clark (born 1900), jazz trumpeter who later managed boxer Sugar Ray Robinson
- Connor Clifton (born 1995), ice hockey defenseman for the Boston Bruins of the NHL
- Paul Cohen (1934–2007), awarded the Fields Medal for developing forcing to show the independence of the continuum hypothesis and the axiom of choice in axiomatic set theory
- James M. Coleman (1924–2014), politician who served in the New Jersey General Assembly and as a judge in New Jersey Superior Court
- Tom Constanten (born 1944), musician, former keyboardist for the Grateful Dead
- Ken Croken (born 1950), member of the Iowa House of Representatives
- John D'Amico Jr. (born 1941), who served on the Monmouth County Board of Chosen Freeholders and served in the New Jersey Senate in 1988 and 1989
- Phil Daly Sr. (1835–1910), gambling house operator
- Herbert Dardik (1935–2020), vascular surgeon who served as the chief of vascular surgery at Englewood Hospital and Medical Center
- Bob Davis (born 1945), former NFL quarterback whose career included three seasons with the New York Jets
- Sean Davis (born 1993), professional soccer player for the New York Red Bulls of Major League Soccer
- David Doubilet (born 1946), underwater photographer
- Frederick Douglass (1818–1895), lived in Long Branch for a short period of time until his home burnt down
- Barnett A. Elzas (1867–1936), rabbi and historian who served as rabbi at Beth Miriam Congregation in Long Branch
- Samuel Feltman (1899–1951), computer scientist and weaponry expert
- Mel Ferrer (1917–2008), actor, director and producer
- Joan Field (1915–1988), concert violinist
- Tom Fleming (1951–2017), distance runner who won the 1973 and 1975 New York City Marathon
- Ryan Fournier (born 1995), conservative activist and political commentator best known as the co-founder of Students for Trump
- Waldo Frank (1889–1967), novelist, historian, political activist and literary critic
- James A. Garfield (1831–1881), 20th President of the United States, died in Long Branch
- David Garrison (born 1952), actor most noted for playing Steve Rhoades on the sitcom Married... with Children
- Richard T. Gill (1927–2010), Harvard University economist who became an opera singer at midlife
- Vin Gopal (born 1985), politician who represents the 11th Legislative District in the New Jersey Senate
- Elizabeth Gorcey (born 1962), filmmaker, actor and writer, best known for her leading role in the movie Footloose (1984)
- Sonny Greer (1895–1982), jazz drummer, best known for his work with Duke Ellington
- John Faucheraud Grimké (1752–1819), father of abolitionists Sarah Grimké and Angelina Grimké
- Sarah Moore Grimké (1792–1873), abolitionist and women's rights activist, briefly lived in Long Branch while caring for her father
- Harry Frank Guggenheim (1890–1971), businessman, diplomat, publisher, philanthropist, aviator and horseman
- Lahav Harkov, journalist who serves as the senior contributing editor and diplomatic correspondent of The Jerusalem Post
- Garret Hobart (1844–1899), 24th Vice President of the United States, under William McKinley
- Winslow Homer (1836–1910), stayed in Long Branch in 1869, while he produced paintings of Victorian women strolling the boardwalks
- Deborah Lee James (born 1958), 23rd Secretary of the United States Air Force
- Jim Jeffcoat (born 1961), professional football player for the Dallas Cowboys and the Buffalo Bills from 1983 to 1997
- Mamie Johnson (1935–2017), professional baseball player who was one of three women, and the first female pitcher, to play in the Negro leagues
- Ed Jones (born 1952), former defensive back for the Edmonton Eskimos of the Canadian Football League from 1976 to 1984, who won five Grey Cups for the Eskimos and was a CFL All-Star from 1979 to 1981
- Julius Katchen (1926–1969), concert pianist, best known for his recordings of Johannes Brahms's solo piano works
- Raja Feather Kelly (born 1986/87), choreographer best known for his work on Off-Broadway shows which combine "pop and queer culture"
- Jim Kerwin (1941–2021), retired basketball player and college coach
- Tom Kerwin (born 1944), professional basketball forward who played in the American Basketball Association for the Pittsburgh Pipers
- Thomas G. Labrecque (1938–2000), business executive who served as president, CEO, and COO of Chase Manhattan Bank
- Connie Lawn (1944–2018), independent broadcast journalist who, at the time of her death, was the longest-serving White House correspondent
- Sigurd Lucassen (1927–2001), carpenter and labor leader who served as president of the United Brotherhood of Carpenters and Joiners of America
- Norman Mailer (1923–2007), novelist
- Jonathan Maslow (1948–2008), author who wrote extensively about nature, with a focus on obscure and little understood animals
- Karen McCloskey (born 1951), rower who competed in the women's quadruple sculls event at the 1976 Summer Olympics
- Walter Mebane (born 1958), University of Michigan professor of political science and statistics and an expert on detecting electoral fraud
- Sam Mills (1959–2005), linebacker who played 12 seasons in the NFL for the New Orleans Saints and Carolina Panthers
- Julian Mitchell (1854–1926), director of the Ziegfeld Follies
- John Montefusco (born 1950), Major League Baseball pitcher 1974 to 1986 for the San Francisco Giants, Atlanta Braves, San Diego Padres and New York Yankees
- Denise Morrison (born 1954), business executive who served as president and chief executive officer of Campbell's from 2011 through 2018
- Frank Pallone (born 1951), member of the United States House of Representatives since 1988, who served on the Long Branch city council from 1982 to 1988
- Dorothy Parker (1893–1967), writer and storied member of the Algonquin Round Table, whose birthplace at 732 Ocean Avenue has been designated as a National Literary Landmark
- Luanne Peterpaul, politician, lawyer, and former judge serving as a member of the New Jersey General Assembly for the 11th legislative district since January 2024
- George R. Pettit (1929–2021), chemist and researcher in the field of natural anticancer compounds
- Robert Pinsky (born 1940), Poet Laureate of the United States from 1997 to 2000
- Anthony Portantino (born 1961), politician who serves in the California State Senate, where he represents the 25th Senate District
- Elizabeth Clare Prophet (1939–2009), spiritual leader, author, orator and writer
- Brian Pulido (born 1961), founder of Chaos! Comics and writer of comics books such as Lady Death, Evil Ernie and Purgatori
- Paris Qualles (born 1951), screenwriter and television producer
- Jim Quirk (born c. 1940), NFL on-field official from 1988 to 2008
- Priscilla Ransohoff (1912–1992), military education specialist and advocate for women in science and federal employment
- Harry Ray (born 1946), R&B vocalist who was a member of the groups "The Moments" and "Ray, Goodman, & Brown"
- Charles Rembar (1915–2000), attorney best known as a First Amendment rights lawyer
- Jason Ryan (born 1976), pitcher who played two seasons for Minnesota Twins
- Melanie Safka (1947–2024), singer-songwriter
- Adam Sarafian (born 1986), geologist who has advanced theories about the origin of water on Earth and pole vaulter who won the national championship in 2004
- Fred Schneider (born 1951), singer, songwriter, arranger and musician, best known as the frontman of the rock band the B-52's, of which he is a founding member
- Scott Schoeneweis (born 1973), a relief pitcher who played for the New York Mets, among other teams
- Rubby Sherr (1913–2013), nuclear physicist who co-invented a key component of the first nuclear weapon while participating in the Manhattan Project
- John W. Slocum (1867–1938), lawyer, county judge, President of the New Jersey Senate
- Bruce Springsteen (born 1949), born in Long Branch and raised in Freehold Borough, New Jersey, wrote "Born to Run", "Thunder Road" and "Backstreets" in a cottage at 7 1/2 West End Court
- John Strollo (born 1954), college football coach
- Danny Stubbs (born 1965), who won multiple National Championships with University of Miami and two Super Bowls with the San Francisco 49ers as a defensive tackle
- Norman Tanzman (1918–2004), politician who served in the New Jersey General Assembly from 1962 to 1968 and in the New Jersey Senate from 1968 to 1974
- Yvonne Thornton (born 1947), obstetrician-gynecologist, musician and author, best known for her memoir, The Ditchdigger's Daughters
- Meghan Tierney (born 1997), snowboarder who represented the United States at the 2018 Olympics and at the 2022 Olympics
- Army Tomaini (1918–2005), American football tackle who played for the New York Giants in 1945
- Johnny Tomaini (1902–1985), professional football player who played in the NFL for the Orange Tornadoes, Newark Tornadoes and Brooklyn Dodgers
- Ivy Troutman (1884–1979), Broadway actress
- John Henry Turpin (1876–1962), one of the first African-American Chief Petty Officers in the United States Navy; also notable for surviving the catastrophic explosions of the USS Maine in 1898 and USS Bennington in 1905
- Chase Untermeyer (born 1946), United States Ambassador to Qatar
- Anthony M. Villane (1929–2022), dentist and politician who was elected to serve seven terms in the New Jersey General Assembly from 1976 to 1988
- John Villapiano (born 1951), former professional football player who played in the World Football League and politician who served on the Monmouth County, New Jersey Board of Chosen Freeholders and the New Jersey General Assembly from 1988 to 1992
- Phil Villapiano (born 1949), former NFL linebacker who played in four Pro Bowls and was a part of the Oakland Raiders Super Bowl XI winning team
- Maggie Wilderotter (born 1955), former chief executive officer of Frontier Communications
- Constance H. Williams (born 1944), politician who served from 2001 to 2009 in the Pennsylvania State Senate
- Earl Wilson (born 1958), NFL and CFL player
- Morris Wood (1882–1967), champion speed skater during the early 1900s
- Bernie Worrell (1944–2016), keyboardist and founding member of Parliament-Funkadelic
- Mike Zapcic, podcaster and cast member of the AMC reality TV show Comic Book Men with Kevin Smith

== In popular culture ==
- The AXS TV reality series, Bikini Barbershop, is set in Long Branch, at Bikini Barbers located on Ocean Boulevard.
- In the HBO series, The Sopranos, Long Branch is the setting for Adriana La Cerva's nightclub, the Crazy Horse (see "The Telltale Moozadell"). In the episode "The Blue Comet", the house in which Tony Soprano hides out towards the end of the series is near the beach in North Long Branch.

== See also ==
- Long Branch, Toronto

Preceded by Monmouth Beach	Beaches of New Jersey	Succeeded by Deal
