= Ocean Township High School =

High school in Monmouth County, New Jersey, US

Location
- 550 West Park Avenue; Ocean Township, Monmouth County, New Jersey 07755; United States; 40.268294°N 74.030285°W

Information
- Type: Public high school
- Established: 1965
- School district: Ocean Township School District
- NCES School ID: 341206004058
- Principal: Dawn Kaszuba
- Faculty: 98.4 FTEs
- Grades: 9-12
- Enrollment: 996 (as of 2023–24)
- Student to teacher ratio: 10.1:1
- Colors: Red white and royal blue
- Athletics conference: Shore Conference
- Team name: Spartans
- Newspaper: Spartan Spirit
- Yearbook: Sandpiper
- Website: oths.oceanschools.org

Ocean Township High School (OTHS) is a four-year comprehensive public high school located in the Oakhurst section of Ocean Township, in Monmouth County, in the U.S. state of New Jersey, operating as the lone secondary school in the Ocean Township School District. OTHS serves residents of all neighborhoods within Ocean Township, including Oakhurst, Wanamassa, Wayside and West Allenhurst.

As of the 2023–24 school year, the school had an enrollment of 996 students and 98.4 classroom teachers (on an FTE basis), for a student–teacher ratio of 10.1:1. There were 212 students (21.3% of enrollment) eligible for free lunch and 61 (6.1% of students) eligible for reduced-cost lunch.

As of the 2013–14 school year there were 18 Advanced Placement (AP) courses offered. In conjunction with Monmouth University, Ocean Township High School offers a dual credit program called MODEL to AP students. The school's average graduation rate for the past two years is 99% and 97% of students go on to post secondary education.

The school's Family and Consumer Science kitchens, for culinary instruction, were remodeled in 2005. Over 93% of Ocean's teachers are at or above intermediate skill levels in the use of technology.

== History ==
Ocean Township's students leaving eighth grade had the option to attend either Asbury Park High School or Long Branch High School as part of sending/receiving relationships, with most Ocean Township students choosing to head to Asbury Park. By 1962, Ocean Township students accounted for a majority of the student body at an overcrowded Asbury Park High School. Ocean Township was unwilling to commit to the long-term sending relationship that would allow Asbury Park to justify an expansion project. Voters in Ocean Township approved a 1962 referendum allocating $3 million (equivalent to $31.9 million in 2025) towards the construction of a high school facility. The school opened in September 1965, serving more than 1,300 students in grades 7–11, which included students in grades 10 and 11 who had previously been sent out of the district for high school. Ocean Township shifted 600 students from Asbury Park to the new high school, with about 300 Ocean Township seniors completing their final year at Asbury Park High School.

The school graduated its first class in 1967. Over time, the 7th and 8th grade students were moved to other schools. Beginning in the 1975–76 school year, with the opening of the then 7-9 Ocean Township Intermediate School, the school only served 10–12, with the freshman class returning to OTHS for the 1978–79 school year.

At the end of the 2016–17 school year, Loch Arbour left the Ocean Township district after getting approval from the New Jersey Department of Education and following the overwhelming passage of a referendum. With 14 public school students and school property taxes of $2 million, Loch Arbour had been paying an average of $143,000 per pupil, while Ocean Township taxpayers only paid approximately $16,000 per pupil. The Loch Arbour cost per student was significantly reduced under new sending/receiving relationships established with the West Long Branch Public Schools for PreK-8 and Shore Regional High School for 9–12, under which Loch Arbour pays tuition to each district based on the number of students. Ocean Township opposed the changes as the subsidy funded approximately 20 staff positions.

== Awards, recognition, and rankings ==
In the 2011 "Ranking America's High Schools" issue by The Washington Post, the school was ranked 55th in New Jersey and 1,637th nationwide. In Newsweek's May 22, 2007, issue, ranking the country's top high schools, Ocean Township High School was listed in 838th place, the 21st-highest ranked school in New Jersey.

In its 2013 report on "America's Best High Schools," The Daily Beast ranked the school 856th in the nation among participating public high schools and 64th among schools in New Jersey.

The school was the 84th-ranked public high school in New Jersey out of 339 schools statewide in New Jersey Monthly magazine's September 2014 cover story on the state's "Top Public High Schools," using a new ranking methodology. The school had been ranked 95th in the state of 328 schools in 2012, after being ranked 64th in 2010 out of 322 schools listed. The magazine ranked the school 97th in 2008 out of 316 schools. The school was ranked 69th in the magazine's September 2006 issue, which surveyed 316 schools across the state. Schooldigger.com ranked the school tied for 148th out of 381 public high schools statewide in its 2011 rankings (a decrease of 31 positions from the 2010 ranking) which were based on the combined percentage of students classified as proficient or above proficient on the mathematics (83.8%) and language arts literacy (93.7%) components of the High School Proficiency Assessment (HSPA).

== Extracurricular activities ==
=== Athletics ===
The Ocean Township High School Spartans compete in Division B North of the Shore Conference, an athletic conference comprised of public and private high schools in Monmouth and Ocean counties along the Jersey Shore. The conference operates under the jurisdiction of the New Jersey State Interscholastic Athletic Association (NJSIAA). With 820 students in grades 10–12, the school was classified by the NJSIAA for the 2019–20 school year as Group III for most athletic competition purposes, which included schools with an enrollment of 761 to 1,058 students in that grade range. The school was classified by the NJSIAA as Group III South for football for 2024–2026, which included schools with 695 to 882 students.

The school participates as the host school / lead agency in a joint ice hockey team with Monmouth Regional High School and Shore Regional High School. The co-op program operates under agreements scheduled to expire at the end of the 2023–24 school year.

The field hockey team won the Central Jersey Group III state sectional championship in 1980, 1985, 1997 and 2001. The field hockey team was the runner-up in the 2020 COVID-19 Regional Championship, behind Rumson-Fair Haven High School.

The 1980 boys' tennis team won the Group III state championship, defeating Moorestown High School 3 1/2-1 1/2 and Millburn High School 4–1.

The 1985 baseball team finished the season with a 24–6 record after defeating Montville Township High School in the championship game by a score of 3–0 to win the Group III state title in a game played at Princeton University.

The girls cross country running team won the Group III state championship in 1992 and 1993.

The football team won the Central Jersey Group III state sectional championships in 1993, 2000 and 2005. After losing all four of its previous state finals, the 1993 team finished the season with an 11–0 record after winning the Central Jersey Group III state sectional title in front of more than 6,000 spectators with a 20–12 victory against a Long Branch High School team that came undefeated into the championship game. As the tournament's seventh seed, Ocean Township High School defeated Nottingham High School (Hamilton High School North) by a score of 41–20 in the 2005 Central Jersey Group III sectional final.

The softball team won the Group III state title in 1993, defeating Ramsey High School by a score of 5–3 in the championship game to finish the season with a record of 25–4.

The boys' soccer team won the Group III state championship in 1996 (defeating Scotch Plains-Fanwood High School in the tournament final) and 2018 (vs. Millburn High School). The 1996 team finished the season with a 16–6 record after defeating Scotch Plains-Fanwood by a score of 2–0 in the Group III championship game. In 2018, the team won the Shore Conference Tournament with a 1–0 overtime win against Christian Brothers Academy and won the program's second Group III title by a score of 1–0 against Millburn in the championship game to finish the season 21-3-1.

The boys' wrestling team won the Central Jersey Group III state sectional championship 2004–2008, 2012, 2019 and 2020.

The boys' bowling team won the Group II state championship in 2011.

== Administration ==
The school's principal is Dawn Kaszuba. Her core administration team includes an assistant principal.

== Notable alumni ==
- Lane Bess (born 1961, class of 1979), venture capitalist known for his work in technology
- Michelle Davidson (born 1970, class of 1989), masters swimmer and a long distance, open water swimmer who accomplished the Triple Crown of Open Water Swimming, which includes crossing the English Channel and Catalina Channel, and circumnavigating Manhattan Island
- Caroline Elkins (born 1969, class of 1987), Pulitzer-prize winning historian and Harvard University professor
- Trent Hindman (born 1995), racing driver who won the 2014 Continental Tire Sports Car Challenge in the GS class
- Robert Legato (born 1956), Academy Award Winner for Visual Effects in 1998 for Titanic and in 2012 for Hugo
- Oren Liebermann (born 1982, Class of 2000), journalist who works as the Pentagon correspondent for CNN
- Susan Littenberg (born 1967, class of 1985), film editor
- Chris Malachowsky (born 1959, class of 1976), electrical engineer who was one of the founders of the computer graphics company Nvidia
- Eric Nies (born 1971), model and reality television personality
- John Nies (born 1967), former NFL punter who played for the Buffalo Bills
- Trebor Pena (born 2002, class of 2020), college football wide receiver for the Syracuse Orange
- Radia Perlman (born 1951, class of 1969), inventor of the Spanning Tree Protocol
- Kenny Pickett (born 1998), Super Bowl winning American football quarterback for the Las Vegas Raiders
- Adam Sarafian (born 1986), geologist who has advanced theories about the origin of water on Earth and pole vaulter who won the national championship in 2004
- Michael Uslan (born 1951), writer and producer of the Batman film franchise
- John Villapiano (born 1951) former professional football player who played in the World Football League and politician who served on the Monmouth County, New Jersey Board of Chosen Freeholders and the New Jersey General Assembly from 1988 to 1992
- Phil Villapiano (born 1949), former NFL linebacker who played in four Pro Bowls and was a part of the Oakland Raiders Super Bowl XI winning team
- Wendy Williams (born 1964), radio and television host
