= Jarecki =

Jarecki (Polish pronunciation: [jaˈrɛt͡ski]; feminine: Jarecka; plural: Jareccy) is a surname of Polish-language origin. It may refer to:

- Andrew Jarecki (born 1963), American filmmaker
- Bogusław Jarecki (born 1957), Polish equestrian
- Christopher Jarecki (born 1976), American musician and radio show host
- Carol Jarecki (1935–2021), American chess organizer and arbiter
- Dariusz Jarecki (born 1981), Polish footballer
- Eugene Jarecki (born 1969), American filmmaker
- Franciszek Jarecki (1931–2010), Polish pilot
- Henry Jarecki (born 1933), American psychiatrist
- Nicholas Jarecki (born 1979), American filmmaker
- Piotr Jarecki (born 1955), Polish prelate
- Richard Jarecki (1931–2018), German-American physician and professional gambler
