= Ocean Township School District (Monmouth County, New Jersey) =

Place in Monmouth County, New Jersey, US

Township of Ocean School District

Address
- 163 Monmouth Road Oakhurst, Monmouth County, New Jersey, 07755; United States
- Coordinates: 40.263626°N 74.012729°W

District information
- Grades: PreK-12
- Superintendent: Kelly E. Weldon
- Business administrator: Geoffrey Hastings
- Schools: 5

Students and staff
- Enrollment: 3,263 (as of 2023–24)
- Faculty: 333.7 FTEs
- Student–teacher ratio: 9.8:1

Other information
- District Factor Group: FG
- Website: www.oceanschools.org
Ind.	Per pupil	District spending	Rank (*)	K-12 average	%± vs. average
1A	Total Spending	$19,963	73	$18,891	5.7%
1	Budgetary Cost	15,888	79	14,783	7.5%
2	Classroom Instruction	9,668	86	8,763	10.3%
6	Support Services	2,155	44	2,392	−9.9%
8	Administrative Cost	1,521	66	1,485	2.4%
10	Operations & Maintenance	1,923	78	1,783	7.9%
13	Extracurricular Activities	463	103	268	72.8%
16	Median Teacher Salary	65,390	56	64,043
Data from NJDoE 2014 Taxpayers' Guide to Education Spending. *Of K-12 districts with more than 3,500 students. Lowest spending=1; Highest=103

The Ocean Township School District (formally known as the Township of Ocean School District) is a comprehensive community public school district serving students in pre-kindergarten through twelfth grade from Ocean Township, in Monmouth County, in the U.S. state of New Jersey.

As of the 2023–24 school year, the district, comprised of five schools, had an enrollment of 3,263 students and 333.7 classroom teachers (on an FTE basis), for a student–teacher ratio of 9.8:1.

== History ==
In 1834, land was purchased by the trustees of the Deal School District and a two-room schoolhouse was built. It served the students until 1885 when the school had 156 students and a larger building was needed. (This school is currently located on Monmouth Road, Oakhurst)

The Poplar Road School, since demolished, was located between Deal Road and West Park Avenue in the Poplar section of town, this school was used from 1864 until 1911 when the students were sent to the new Oakhurst School.

The first Wayside School was located on the Tinton Falls side of Hope Road it was used until 1911, when pupils were sent to the new Oakhurst School, at this time however all high school students traveled to Long Branch High School by stagecoach.

The Oakhurst School was built in 1900. It accommodated all students from Wayside and Oakhurst in grades one to eight from 1900 until 1958. From 1959 to 1975, it was used as a K-4 and K-5 facility. Principals included Ralph Busch, Charles J. Strahan, Frank Parker, Jesse Love, Harry Patterson, Estelle Voorhees, Ernest Smith, Richard Randall, John D.W. Rasp, Donald Vineburg, and Glen Morgan. Since 1975, the building has been used as the school district's administrative offices.

The Wanamassa School, opened in 1930 to serve all students in Wanamassa. Before that, students walked to the Bradley School in Asbury Park. The school is still used to this day for grades PK-4 and Special Education Disabilities Classes. Principals included Victoria Green, Edward German, J. Anthony Covino, Joseph Palaia, Douglas Deicke, Camille Tighe, Margaret Grilli, Justine Salvo, and current Victor Milano.

The Ocean Township Elementary School on Dow Avenue opened in 1958 as a middle school, serving grades five to eight. Upper-grade teachers from Wanamassa and Oakhurst Schools moved to the new school with their principal J. Anthony Covino. In 1984, Cavino retired and Mrs. Villapiano, assistant principal, took over. At her retirement in 2002, William Galatro took over and served until 2007. Doreen O. Ryan served as principal until the 2020s. From there, Melissa Lopusznick took over and still is principal. The school currently houses Grades PK-4 and Special Education Disabilities Classes.

The Wayside Elementary School opened on January 5, 1970. It houses grades PK-4. John D.W. Rasp was the first principal until 1988. Other principals have included Douglas Deicke, Thomas Pagano, David Enderly, and currently Denise Palaia.

Before the Ocean Township High School opened in 1965, students from the district were bused to Long Branch High School or Asbury Park High School. The principals were Charles Scott, Douglas Fredricks, Robert Mahon, Gardner Atlee, John Crews, John Connelly, John Tighe, Margaret Morgan, John Lysko, William Cohee, Julia Davidow, and currently Kelly E. Weldon.

The Township of Ocean Intermediate School was opened in 1975 to house grades seven, eight, and nine. It now houses grades five, six, seven, and eight.

In April 2017, more than 95% of Loch Arbour voters participating in a referendum chose to leave the Ocean Township district and to begin sending students for elementary school to the West Long Branch Public Schools and then move on to attend Shore Regional High School, under the terms of sending/receiving relationships with the two districts by which Loch Arbour would be charged on a per-pupil basis. The average cost to Loch Arbour taxpayers of educating students in the sending districts would be $16,000 per student, a significant drop from the $126,000 was paying in property taxes per student under its relationship as part of the Ocean Township School District.

The district had been classified by the New Jersey Department of Education as being in District Factor Group "FG", the fourth-highest of eight groupings. District Factor Groups organize districts statewide to allow comparison by common socioeconomic characteristics of the local districts. From lowest socioeconomic status to highest, the categories are A, B, CD, DE, FG, GH, I and J.

=== Laramie Project controversy ===
In August, 2007 the high school received international attention when its principal, Julia Davidow, backed by superintendent of schools Thomas Pagano decided to prohibit West Park Players, the school's drama club, from staging the play The Laramie Project. The play, an account of the 1998 murder of gay Wyoming student Matthew Shepard, had a pro-LGBT and pro-tolerance message that the two administrators felt would offend conservative community values, Davidow stating "I do not want to draw a line between those who think homosexuality is right and those who think it is wrong. I have a school community to run here and I must protect everyone involved." In the wake of widespread outrage at Pagano's and Davidow's act and calls for their disciplining, the play was reinstated.

== Schools ==
Schools in the district (with 2023–24 enrollment data from the National Center for Education Statistics) are:

Elementary schools

- Ocean Township Elementary School with 392 students in grades PreK–4 (located in Oakhurst)
  - Melissa Lopusznick, principal
- Wanamassa Elementary School with 357 students in grades PreK–4 (Wanamassa)
  - John Bosmans Jr., principal
- Wayside Elementary School with 590 students in grades PreK–4 (Wayside)
  - Denise T. Palaia, principal

Middle school

- Ocean Township Intermediate School with 861 students in grades 5–8 (Wayside)
  - Christopher Amato, principal

High school

- Ocean Township High School with 996 students in grades 9–12 (Oakhurst)
  - Dawn Kaszuba, principal

== Special education ==
The district provides a Free Appropriate Public Education for all students with disabilities between the ages of 3 and 21 in the least restrictive environment. All children 3 through 21, who reside in the Township of Ocean School District are provided with access to some kind of special education.

== Administration ==
Core members of the district's administration are:

- Kelly E. Weldon, superintendent
- Geoffrey Hastings, business administrator and board secretary

== Board of education ==
The district's board of education, comprised of nine members, sets policy and oversees the fiscal and educational operation of the district through its administration. As a Type II school district, the board's trustees are elected directly by voters to serve three-year terms of office on a staggered basis, with three seats up for election each year held (since 2012) as part of the November general election. The board appoints a superintendent to oversee the district's day-to-day operations and a business administrator to supervise the business functions of the district.
