= Alcohol: Clinical & Experimental Research =

- Discipline: Alcoholism
- Language: English
- Edited by: Henry Kranzler

Publication details
- Former names: Alcoholism: Clinical and Experimental Research
- History: 1977–present
- Publisher: Wiley-Blackwell
- Frequency: Monthly
- Impact factor: 3.455 (2020)

Standard abbreviations
- ISO 4: Alcohol: Clin. Exp. Res.
- NLM: Alcohol Clin Exp Res

Indexing
- CODEN: ACRSDM
- ISSN: 0145-6008 (print); 1530-0277 (web)
- LCCN: 77640782
- OCLC no.: 02777940

Links
- Journal homepage; Online access; Online archive

Alcohol: Clinical & Experimental Research is a scientific journal covering research concerning alcohol abuse and its treatment. It is published by Wiley-Blackwell on behalf of the Research Society on Alcoholism and the International Society for Biomedical Research on Alcoholism. It was established as Alcoholism: Clinical and Experimental Research in 1977, and acquired its current name in 2023.

== Abstracting and indexing ==
The journal is abstracted and indexed in Academic Search, Current Awareness in Biological Sciences, Biological Abstracts, BIOSIS Previews, CAB Abstracts, CAB HEALTH, CABDirect, CSA Biological Sciences Database, Current Contents, EMBASE, EMBiology, Index Medicus/MEDLINE/PubMed, Neuroscience Citation Index, Psychological Abstracts/PsycINFO, Science Citation Index, and Scopus. According to the Journal Citation Reports, the journal has a 2020 impact factor of 3.455, ranking it 12th out of 21 journals in the category "Substance Abuse".
