= Shore Regional High School =

High school in Monmouth County, New Jersey, US

Address
- 132 Route 36 West Long Branch, Monmouth County, New Jersey, 07764; United States
- Coordinates: 40.30497°N 74.014183°W

District information
- Grades: 9-12
- Superintendent: Lisa J. English
- Business administrator: Andrew Polo
- Schools: 1

Students and staff
- Enrollment: 573 (as of 2024–25)
- Faculty: 52.0 FTEs
- Student–teacher ratio: 11.0:1

Other information
- District Factor Group: FG
- Website: www.shoreregional.org
Ind.	Per pupil	District spending	Rank (*)	9-12 average	%± vs. average
1A	Total Spending	$26,492	45	$18,891	40.2%
1	Budgetary Cost	18,020	40	15,592	15.6%
2	Classroom Instruction	9,672	36	8,807	9.8%
6	Support Services	2,796	36	2,294	21.9%
8	Administrative Cost	1,589	18	1,592	−0.2%
10	Operations & Maintenance	2,282	38	1,954	16.8%
13	Extracurricular Activities	1,523	46	873	74.5%
16	Median Teacher Salary	65,800	20	71,726
Data from NJDoE 2014 Taxpayers' Guide to Education Spending. *Of 9-12 districts with any number of students. Lowest spending=1; Highest=47

Shore Regional High School

Information
- Type: Public high school
- Motto: "Shore Pride"
- Established: 1962
- School district: Shore Regional High School District
- NCES School ID: 341494004100
- Principal: Vincent DalliCardillo
- Faculty: 52.0 FTEs
- Grades: 9-12
- Enrollment: 556 (as of 2024–25)
- Student to teacher ratio: 10.7:1
- Colors: Royal blue and white
- Athletics conference: Shore Conference
- Team name: Blue Devils
- Accreditation: Middle States Association of Colleges and Schools

Shore Regional High School is a regional public high school and school district serving students from four communities in Monmouth County, in the U.S. state of New Jersey. The high school serves students from the constituent municipalities of Allenhurst, Interlaken, Loch Arbour, Monmouth Beach, Oceanport, Sea Bright and West Long Branch, where the school is located. The school is the only facility of the Shore Regional High School District.

Students from Interlaken attend public school in the West Long Branch Public Schools for K-8 and Shore Regional High School for grades 9–12, as part of sending/receiving relationships with the districts in which students attend on a tuition basis, having ended a longstanding relationship with the Asbury Park Public Schools, as do students from Loch Arbour, who began attending schools in West Long Branch for K-8 and Shore Regional for 9–12 starting in the 2017–18 school year, after leaving the Ocean Township School District. Students from Deal attended the Deal School District for K-8 and then attend Shore Regional following the termination of its previous agreement with Asbury Park.

Shore Regional High School has been an IB World School since April 2007, offering students the IB Diploma Programme. The school is accredited until July 2026 and has been accredited by the Middle States Association of Colleges and Schools Commission on Elementary and Secondary Schools since 1969; The school's accreditation status was extended for seven years in Fall 2018.

As of the 2024–25 school year, the school had an enrollment of 556 students and 52.0 classroom teachers (on an FTE basis), for a student–teacher ratio of 10.7:1. There were 76 students (13.7% of enrollment) eligible for free lunch and 8 (1.4% of students) eligible for reduced-cost lunch.

== History ==
Although a regional district had previously been discussed, the efforts to create the high school gained momentum after the four districts were notified by the Long Branch Public Schools that its students could not be accepted at Long Branch High School after 1965. Voters in all four municipalities approved a March 1960 referendum to establish the district. The "Shore Regional High School" name was adopted in June 1960, though the public was reassured that the name could be updated "if it is found unsatisfactory".

By a 70%-30% margin, voters approved a March 1961 referendum that allocated $2.2 million (equivalent to $23.7 million in 2025) towards the costs of construction of a facility that would accommodate 1,000 students for the 1962-63 school year.

The high school opened in September 1962 for grades 9-11, with seniors remaining at Long Branch High School, which was able to end double sessions.

The district had been classified by the New Jersey Department of Education as being in District Factor Group "FG", the fourth-highest of eight groupings. District Factor Groups organize districts statewide to allow comparison by common socioeconomic characteristics of the local districts. From lowest socioeconomic status to highest, the categories are A, B, CD, DE, FG, GH, I and J.

=== Budgetary issues ===
The $12.1 million budget for the 2006–07 school year failed to pass after it was turned down by voters in Oceanport and Sea Bright. By a more than 5–2 margin, voters in all four districts rejected a $49.8 million bond referendum that would have been used for renovations to the school building. Officials from all four sending districts agreed to $300,000 in cuts from the district's $11.65 million budget for the 2004–05 school year after it was rejected by voters. Voters rejected the district's $11.1 million budget for 2003–04, which was ultimately cut by $161,000 by the New Jersey Commissioner of Education.

== Awards, recognition and rankings ==
The school was the 61st-ranked public high school in New Jersey out of 339 schools statewide in New Jersey Monthly magazine's September 2014 cover story on the state's "Top Public High Schools", using a new ranking methodology. The school had been ranked 134th in the state of 328 schools in 2012, after being ranked 111th in 2010 out of 322 schools listed. The magazine ranked the school 94th in 2008 out of 316 schools. The school was also ranked 94th in the magazine's September 2006 issue, which surveyed 316 schools across the state. Schooldigger.com ranked the school 108th out of 381 public high schools statewide in its 2011 rankings (a decrease of 3 positions from the 2010 ranking) which were based on the combined percentage of students classified as proficient or above proficient on the mathematics (86.6%) and language arts literacy (95.9%) components of the High School Proficiency Assessment (HSPA).

In its 2013 report on "America's Best High Schools", The Daily Beast ranked the school 814th in the nation among participating public high schools and 59th among schools in New Jersey.

In 2009, six members of the Senior class were named recipients of the Edward J. Bloustein Distinguished Scholar award.

== Athletics ==
The Shore Regional High School Blue Devils compete in Division A Central of the Shore Conference, an athletic conference comprised of public and private high schools in Monmouth and Ocean counties along the Jersey Shore. The league operates under the jurisdiction of the New Jersey State Interscholastic Athletic Association (NJSIAA). With 504 students in grades 10–12, the school was classified by the NJSIAA for the 2019–20 school year as Group II for most athletic competition purposes, which included schools with an enrollment of 486 to 758 students in that grade range. The school was classified by the NJSIAA as Group I South for football for 2024–2026, which included schools with 185 to 482 students.

The school participates with Monmouth Regional High School in a joint ice hockey team in which Ocean Township High School is the host school / lead agency. The co-op program operates under agreements scheduled to expire at the end of the 2023–24 school year.

The school was the winner of the 2014–15 ShopRite Cup for Group I, finishing with 68 points. The school repeated as Group I ShopRite champion in 2015–16 with first-place finishes in girls tennis, field hockey, girls soccer and football, a second-place finish in girls lacrosse plus points for having no disqualifications in the winter and spring seasons.

Shore Regional's most successful men's program has been the football team. Consistent contenders in small-school (Group I/II) play, the football team won the NJSIAA state sectional championships in Central Jersey Group II in 1981, 1982 and 1988, and in Central Jersey Group I in 1997, 2010, 2014 and 2016. Undefeated seasons include 8-0-1 in 1964, 9–0 in both 1978 and 1984, 11–0 in 1981 and 12–0 in 2015. The 1981 team was the Central Jersey Group III champion, defeating Asbury Park High School by a score of 35–0 in the finals to finish 11–0. With a 9–0 win in the tournament final, the 1988 team won the Central Jersey Group II sectional title and finished the season at 9–2. The 2010 team finished the season with an 11–1 record after winning the Central Jersey Group I sectional title with a 30–6 win against Dunellen High School in the championship game. The team won the Central Jersey Group I state title in 2015 with a 56–28 win against Palmyra High School. The school has had a longstanding football rivalry with Point Pleasant Beach High School, and leads the series with an overall record of 30-12 through the 2017 season, including the games in which the two teams faced each other in the Central Jersey Group I championship game in both 2013 and 2014. NJ.com listed the rivalry at 29th on their 2017 list "Ranking the 31 fiercest rivalries in N.J. HS football".

The boys' wrestling team won its first sectional championship and 8th overall divisional championship in 2019 with a 45–19 win over rival Point Pleasant Beach in the Central Jersey Group I finals. Nine wrestlers on that team also qualified for the region 5 tournament and four wrestlers were crowned as district champions including Jack Maida who would go on to finish 6th in the state at 106 lbs and Al De Santis who would place 7th in the state the following year at 138 lbs. The team was also ranked 8th in the Shore Conference that year, its highest ranking ever, and placed 5th in the Shore Conference Tournament. Head Coach Dave Porta, who has been the Blue Devils head coach since 2010, was named District 20 Coach of the Year, Region 5 Coach of the Year, and Shore Conference Wrestling Coach of the year by numerous media outlets including the Asbury Park Press, NJ.com, and Shoresportsnetwork.com. Assistant Coach Rich Santangelo was also named the District 20 Assistant Coach of the Year as well as the Jersey Shore Interscholastic Wrestling Association Assistant Coach of the year that season. Since 2010, the team has crowned 12 district champions including Luke Bush, Derek Arnette, Austin Cannon, Jack Maida, Taylor Sousa, Mike McGhee and Al De Santis. All 10 of the Blue Devils 100 match winners have come from 2010 and on as well.

With the emergence of women's lacrosse in the Shore Conference, Shore Regional now has two premier state-recognized women's programs.

The field hockey team has enjoyed great success for decades, with Coach Nancy Williams having won 700 games in 37 years coaching, making her the winningest coach in the nation. The field hockey team won the Central Jersey Group II sectional title in 1979, 1980, 1983, 1984, 1986, 1987, 1989, 1991–1995 and 2000, won the Central Jersey Group I title in 1996–1999, 2001 and 2002, and won the South Jersey Group I title in 2007, 2009, 2011, 2013, 2014, 2015, 2018 and 2019. The team won the Group II state championship in 1979, 1980, 1986, 1992–1994 and won the Group I championship in 1996, 1998, 1999, 2002, 2009, 2011, 2013–2015, 2018, 2019, 2021, 2024, and 2025. The program's 20 state championships are the third-most of any school in the state. The 1980 team finished the season 20-0 and extended their winning streak to 41 games after winning the Group II title with a 1–0 win against Vernon Township High School in the tournament final at Mercer County Park. In 2007, the field hockey team won the North II, Group I state sectional championship with a 2–1 win over Pingry School in the tournament final.

The 1988 softball team finished the season with a record of 31-2 after winning the Group II state title, defeating Whippany Park High School by a score of 2–0 on a two-hitter in the championship game. NJ.com / The Star-Ledger ranked Shore as their number-one softball team in the state in 1988.

The baseball team won the Group II state championship in 1993 (vs. Rutherford High School in the finals) and won the Group I title in 2014 (vs. Ridgefield Memorial High School). The 1993 team defeated defending-champion Rutherford High School by a score of 5–1 in the tournament final to finish the season 23–5. The program won its second title with a 7–1 win against Ridgefield in the Group I final.

Shore Regional won its first state title in men's cross country during the 2001 season and went on to repeat as Group I state champions in 2002. The women's cross country team won their first state title in 2001 season. That team went on to repeat as state champions in 2002 in Group I, and again in both 2003 and 2004 in Group II.

The boys' track team won the Group I indoor relay state championship in 2005 and 2006.

The 2006 girls' lacrosse team made Shore Regional and Shore Conference history by winning the Group B state championship against West Essex High School. This win enabled the team to advance to the state final against Moorestown High School, the furthest any team from Shore Regional team in the history of the lacrosse program has ever advanced this far. The girls lacrosse won the 2007 South, Group I state sectional championship, edging Holy Cross High School 10–9 in the tournament final. The team moved on to win the Group I state championship with a 9–7 win vs. Mountain Lakes High School.

The girls' soccer team won the Group I state title in 2013 (as co-champion with Glen Ridge High School), 2015-2017 (vs. Glen Ridge each of the three seasons), 2021 (vs. Mountain Lakes High School) and 2025 (vs. Verona High School). The program's six state championships are tied for eighth-most in the state.

== Shore Players ==
Shore Players, the Shore Regional theatre department, has focused mainly on musicals and has performed productions such as West Side Story, Fiddler on the Roof, Grease, Seussical, Evita, one of their largest productions yet, Beauty and the Beast (which won several Count Basie Awards, including Overall Musical, Outstanding Choreography, Set Design and Chorus), Over Here!, and Gypsy (in which a few students won Count Basie and Papermill Awards).

== Music Performance ==
In the music performance program, there are several subdivisions such as chorus, jazz band, concert band, and marching band.

== Notable alumni ==
- Holly Black (born 1971, class of 1990), co-author of The Spiderwick Chronicles, which was made into a feature film in 2008
- John Farrell (born 1962, class of 1980), former manager of the Boston Red Sox, previously manager of the Toronto Blue Jays
- Henry Kranzler (born 1950), psychiatrist and researcher in the genetic and pharmacological aspects of alcoholism and other substance use disorders
- Fred Schneider (born 1951, class of 1969), frontman and founding member of the rock band The B-52's
- Chris Vaughn (born 1976), filmmaker, songwriter and producer, who made the documentary Jerseyboy Hero, which features appearances by Bruce Springsteen and Nick Vallelonga
- Jordan Woolley (born 1981, class of 1999), actor who has appeared on television and film, including on As the World Turns
- Jeff Wulkan (born 1983), entrepreneur, CEO of Bikini Barbers and reality TV star of Bikini Barbershop
- Jack Yonezuka (born 2003, class of 2021), judoka who competed in the 2024 Summer Olympics

== Administration ==
Core members of the district / school administration are:

- Lisa J. English, superintendent of schools
- Andrew Polo, business administrator and board secretary
- Vincent DalliCardillo, principal

== Board of education ==
The district's board of education, comprised of nine members, sets policy and oversees the fiscal and educational operation of the district through its administration. As a Type II school district, the board's trustees are elected directly by voters to serve three-year terms of office on a staggered basis, with three seats up for election each year held (since 2012) as part of the November general election. The board appoints a superintendent to oversee the district's day-to-day operations and a business administrator to supervise the business functions of the district. Seats on the board of education are allocated based on the population of the constituent municipalities, with four assigned to West Long Branch, three to Oceanport, and one each from Monmouth Beach and Sea Bright.
