= Yeiser =

Yeiser is a surname. Notable people with the surname include:

- Idabelle Yeiser (born c.1897), African-American poet and writer
- Jimmie Yeiser, American educator
- Sarah Yeiser Mason (1896–1980), American screenwriter and script supervisor

== See also ==
- David Yeiser House
