= John Nies =

American football player (born 1967)

- Born: February 13, 1967 (age 58); Jersey City, New Jersey, U.S.
- Modeling information
- Height: 6 ft 2 in (188 cm)

John Nies (born February 13, 1967) was a sixth round (154th overall) pick in the 1990 NFL draft out of University of Arizona to the Buffalo Bills, where he played for one year as a punter. Along with his younger brother Eric Nies (later of MTV's The Real World fame), John Nies subsequently became a fashion model, actor and host of numerous ESPN programs.

John was inspired to start "The Power Center" after a paradigm shifting experience with a Kung Fu Grandmaster and founded The Power Center in early 2000. Finally bringing his passion to life in an intense personal and group fitness training facility. His trademark training style "East West Chi" is a fusion of Eastern health and wellness philosophies and more contemporary Western training techniques that serve as a model for living a fully integrated life mentally, physically and spiritually. John is the owner of The Power Center in Red Bank, New Jersey, a group fitness and personal training facility. At his fitness center and through speaking engagements John Nies focuses on prevention of illness, sport-specific training program for athletes, the cultivation of personal discipline, as well as helping clients overcome substance abuse, food addictions, insomnia, depression, fear and anxiety, low energy levels, and other related complaints related to physical and mental health.

Nies is a fitness ambassador with Lululemon, a contributor to the newly published book, "Beauty Pearls for Chemo Girls", as an expert on fitness and the power of using your mind and visualization as a tool for healing during chemotherapy for cancer patients. In addition, he is part of the Hollywood Heroes campaign as a spokesperson for Kids Kicking Cancer, a non-profit organization dedicated to helping children with cancer through mind-body training in the martial arts.

== Family ==
John and Eric Nies are the sons of Jack Nies "one of the longest running referees in NBA history", and Anna May, a pre-school teacher. Nies was raised in Ocean Township, Monmouth County, New Jersey. He attended Red Bank Catholic High School but hazing from older students led him to transfer to Ocean Township High School.

Nies has two sons Mikey and Jack, who also play football. Also he has two daughters named Juliet and Nicole.
