= Asbury Park High School =

High school in Monmouth County, New Jersey, US

Location
- 1003 Sunset Avenue; Asbury Park, Monmouth County, New Jersey 07712; United States; 40.227847°N 74.013208°W

Information
- Type: Public high school
- Motto: Building a Brighter Future
- Established: 1926
- School district: Asbury Park Public Schools
- NCES School ID: 340093003732
- Principal: Perry J. Medina
- Faculty: 32.5 FTEs
- Grades: 7-12
- Enrollment: 379 (as of 2024–25)
- Student to teacher ratio: 11.7:1
- Colors: Columbia Blue and Black
- Athletics conference: Shore Conference
- Team name: Bishops
- Rivals: Neptune HS; Long Branch HS
- Website: aphs.asburypark.k12.nj.us

Asbury Park High School is a comprehensive, community public high school serving students in seventh through twelfth grades. It is in a landmark building in Asbury Park, in Monmouth County, in the U.S. state of New Jersey, that was constructed as a model high school campus. It is part of the Asbury Park Public Schools, an Abbott District serving children in pre-kindergarten through twelfth grade. The current school building opened to students in September 1926.

As of the 2024–25 school year, the school had an enrollment of 379 students and 32.5 classroom teachers (on an FTE basis), for a student–teacher ratio of 11.7:1. There were 241 students (63.6% of enrollment) eligible for free lunch and 15 (4.0% of students) eligible for reduced-cost lunch.

As part of a reconfiguration of district schools announced in July 2019, students in grades 7 and 8 began attending classes in the high school in September 2020.

Students from Deal attend the high school as part of a sending/receiving relationship. Students from Belmar attend either Asbury Park High School or Manasquan High School.

== History ==
Constructed at a cost of $1 million (equivalent to $18.2 million in 2025), the school building opened in September 1926 for 800 students, though the auditorium had not yet been completed when the building opened for the year.

Students from Ocean Township, Monmouth County, New Jersey had been sent to Asbury Park and by 1962 accounted for a majority of students in an increasingly overcrowded high school. Ocean Township voters approved a referendum to cover the cost of construction of Ocean Township High School, which opened in September 1965 for students through 11th grade, with 12th graders completing their education in Asbury Park.

Students from Allenhurst and Interlaken had attended the district's schools as part of sending/receiving relationships that have since been terminated. Interlaken received permission of the Commissioner New Jersey Department of Education in July 2014 to terminate its sending agreement with Asbury Park, which was replaced with a new relationship with the West Long Branch Public Schools for grades K-8 and with Shore Regional High School for grades 9-12. In July 2017, the DoE's Acting Commissioner approved a plan by Allenhurst to end its sending relationship with Asbury Park and join Interlaken in sending to West Long Branch and Shore Regional. The nearly 40 public school students from Allenhurst would start transitioning to the new sending districts as the relationship with Asbury Park is severed.

== Awards, recognition and rankings ==
The school was the 313th-ranked public high school in New Jersey out of 339 schools statewide in New Jersey Monthly magazine's September 2014 cover story on the state's "Top Public High Schools", using a new ranking methodology. The school had been ranked 177th in the state of 328 schools in 2012, after being ranked 280th in 2010 out of 322 schools listed. The magazine ranked the school 281st in 2008 out of 316 schools. The school was ranked 296th in the magazine's September 2006 issue, which surveyed 316 schools across the state. Schooldigger.com ranked the school 379th out of 381 public high schools statewide in its 2011 rankings (a decrease of 12 positions from the 2010 ranking) which were based on the combined percentage of students classified as proficient or above proficient on the mathematics (16.7%) and language arts literacy (46.6%) components of the High School Proficiency Assessment (HSPA).

== Athletics ==
The Asbury Park High School Bishops compete in Division B Central of the Shore Conference, an athletic conference comprised of public and private high schools in Monmouth and Ocean counties along the Jersey Shore. The league operates under the jurisdiction of the New Jersey State Interscholastic Athletic Association (NJSIAA). With 324 students in grades 10-12, the school was classified by the NJSIAA for the 2019–20 school year as Group I for most athletic competition purposes, which included schools with an enrollment of 75 to 476 students in that grade range. The school was classified by the NJSIAA as Group I South for football for 2022–2024, which included schools with 185 to 482 students.

The boys basketball team won the Group IV title in 1936 vs. Emerson High School, in 1941 vs. West New York Memorial High School, in 1943 vs. Trenton Central High School, won Group II titles in 1978 vs. Lodi High School and in 1987 vs. Orange High School, and won Group I titles in 2011 vs. Jonathan Dayton High School and in 2012 vs. University High School. A crowd of 3,500 watched the 1941 team win the Group IV state title with a 35-32 win against West New York in the championship game played at the Elizabeth Armory. The 2011 team defeated Jonathan Dayton by a score of 64-50 in the Group I tournament final.

The boys cross country team won the Group IV state title in 1950 (as co-champion) and won the Group II title in 1990 and 1993.

The boys' tennis team was the state overall co-champion in 1950 with Millville High School, the first year that the state title was determined by playoffs.

The girls' basketball team won the Group III state titles in 1976 and 1977, defeating Paramus Catholic High School in the playoff finals in both years and won the Group II state championship in 1984 vs. Whippany Park High School. The 1977 team finished the season 31-1 after winning the Group III state title with a 70-47 victory against Paramus Catholic in the championship game. The team won the Group II title in 1984 with a 61-39 finals win against Whippany Park.

The boys track team won the indoor / winter track championship in Group III in 1977 and 1980, won the Group II title in 1978, 1983-1985 and 1989–1996, and won the Group I title in 1988; the 15 state championship won by the boys program is tied for second-most in the state. The girls track team won the Group I title in 1988 and the Group II title in 1990, 1993, 1994; The four championships won by the girls program is tied for tenth-most statewide.

The boys track team won the indoor relay championship in Group III in 1977, in Group II in 1978 and 1981–1985, and won the Group I title in 1988–1995; the 15 championships won by the boys program are the third-most in the state and the streak of eight titles from 1988 to 1995 is one of two of that length statewide and the five consecutive titles from 1981 to 1985 is the state's fourth-longest. The girls team won the Group I/II title in 1981, won the Group II title in 1992, 1993.

The boys track team won the spring / outdoor track state championship in Group III in 1977, in Group II in 1978, 1982, 1983, 1985, 1993 and 1995, and won in Group I in 1988.

The school's football team won the Central Jersey Group II title in both 1980 and 1984, before winning the Central Jersey Group I state sectional championship in 2007–2009, 2011 and 2016. The 2007 football team won the Central Jersey, Group I state sectional championship with a 32–18 win over Keansburg High School in a game played at Rutgers Stadium, finishing the season with an 11–1 record and earning its first state title in more than 20 years. The team won the Central Jersey Group I title in 2011 with a 42–18 win against Florence Township Memorial High School in the playoff finals. The program won its seventh playoff-era title in 2016, when the team defeated Keyport High School by a score of 26–17 in the tournament final of the Central Jersey Group I state sectional championships.

The girls spring track team was the Group II state champion in 1993.

== Administration ==
The school's principal is Perry J. Medina.

== Notable alumni ==
- Dave Aron (born 1964), recording engineer, live and studio mixer, record producer and musician
- Brute Force (stage name of Stephen Friedland; born 1940, class of 1957), singer and songwriter
- Frank Budd (1939–2014), world class sprinter, and later wide receiver in the NFL for the Philadelphia Eagles and the Washington Redskins
- James M. Coleman (1924–2014, class of 1942), politician who served in the New Jersey General Assembly and as a judge in New Jersey Superior Court
- Linda Deutsch (1943–2024), journalist who worked for the Associated Press
- Robert B. Duffield (1917-2000), radiochemist who headed the Argonne National Laboratory
- Les Dugan (1921–2002), American football coach who was the first head football coach at Buffalo State College, serving from 1981 to 1985
- Harry Hammond Hess (1906–1969, class of 1923), geologist and a United States Navy officer in World War II who is considered one of the "founding fathers" of the unifying theory of plate tectonics
- Stephen L. Hoffman (born 1948, class of 1966), physician-scientist, tropical medicine specialist and vaccinologist
- Robert C. Holub (1949–2023), germanist, university professor and administrator who served as chancellor of the University of Massachusetts Amherst
- James J. Howard (1927–1988), politician who represented New Jersey's 3rd congressional district in the United States House of Representatives from 1965 to 1988
- Carol Jarecki (1935–2021), chess organizer, an International Arbiter and a chess writer
- Richard Jarecki (1931-2018), physician who won more than $1 million from a string of European casinos after cracking a pattern in roulette wheels
- Joli Quentin Kansil (born 1943, class of 1960), games inventor of 36 card games, word games, board games and dice games
- Dave Rible (born 1967), politician who represented the 30th Legislative District in the New Jersey General Assembly and has served as Director of the New Jersey Division of Alcoholic Beverage Control
- Harry Rockafeller (1894–1978), All-American football player, head coach and athletic director at Rutgers University
- Ednah Root (1907–1987), painter, sculptor, textile artist, and philanthropist
- Cesar Romero (1907–1994), actor, singer, dancer, voice artist and comedian who played the Joker in the Batman television series
- John F. Russo (1933–2017), attorney and politician who served in the New Jersey Senate from 1974 to 1992 and was Senate President
- Patti Scialfa (born 1953), singer-songwriter and musician, wife of Bruce Springsteen
- Thomas S. Smith (1917–2002), politician who served in the New Jersey General Assembly from 1992 until his death
- E. Donald Sterner (1894-1983), politician who served in both houses of the New Jersey Legislature
- George Stetter (born 1945), retired Canadian football player who played for the Montreal Alouettes and Ottawa Rough Riders
- Johnny Tomaini (1902–1985), professional football player who played in the NFL for the Orange Tornadoes, Newark Tornadoes and Brooklyn Dodgers
- Phil Villapiano (born 1949), former NFL linebacker who played in four Pro Bowls and was a part of the Oakland Raiders Super Bowl XI winning team, he attended Asbury Park HS through his sophomore year, before transferring to Ocean Township High School when it opened in 1965
- Lenny Welch (1938–2025), pop singer
- Idabelle Yeiser (c. 1900-1954), poet, writer, and educator, who was part of the New Negro Movement in Philadelphia
