= Jeff Wulkan =

American businessman (born 1983)

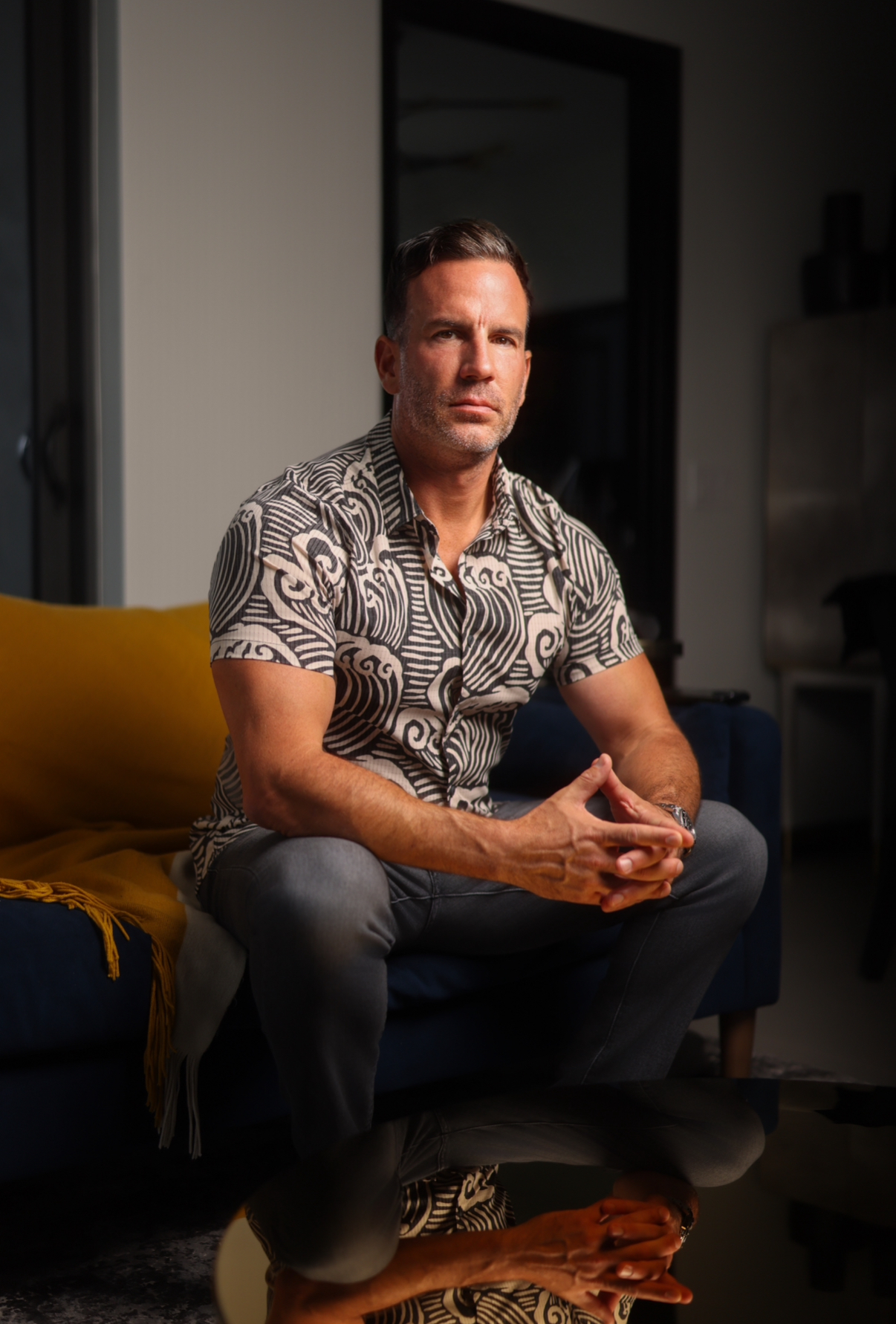
- Born: Jeffrey Michael Wulkan; June 11, 1983 (age 43); Red Bank, New Jersey, U.S.
- Occupations: Entrepreneur, Pilot
- Years active: 2011–present
- Television: Bikini Barbershop

Jeffrey Michael Wulkan (born June 11, 1983) is an American entrepreneur, commercial pilot, author and reality television personality. He starred in the AXS TV show Bikini Barbershop, which first aired February 19, 2012. Wulkan is also featured in HBO's The Rehearsal Season 2, Episode 2. Wulkan founded Mile High Wines, an aviation-themed wine company.

== Early life ==
Wulkan was born in Red Bank, New Jersey and grew up in nearby Oceanport, New Jersey. He attended Shore Regional High School. He went on to achieve a Bachelor's Degree in Aerospace Science at Utah Valley University.

== Career ==
=== Aviation ===
Wulkan earned his commercial pilot license in 2004.

=== Business ===
Bikini Barbers flagship shop opened in February 2011, in Long Branch, New Jersey. In January 2019, Wulkan established Mile High Wines.

In December 2020, Wulkan founded tech company HowTu, an online portal that connects users with qualified instructors with co-founder Angie Romasanta.

In May 2021, Wulkan co-founded Lighten Up a Little, an e-commerce site for apparel and accessories.

=== Television ===
Bikini Barbershop, starring Wulkan, aired for the first time in February 2012. It ran for 14 episodes.

In April 2025, he appeared in the second and third episodes of season 2 of The Rehearsal on HBO.

=== Author ===
In 2024, Wulkan published a memoir entitled Catch Flights Not Feelings. The book is a memoir of his career in aviation and business.
