= Phil Villapiano =

American football player (born 1949)

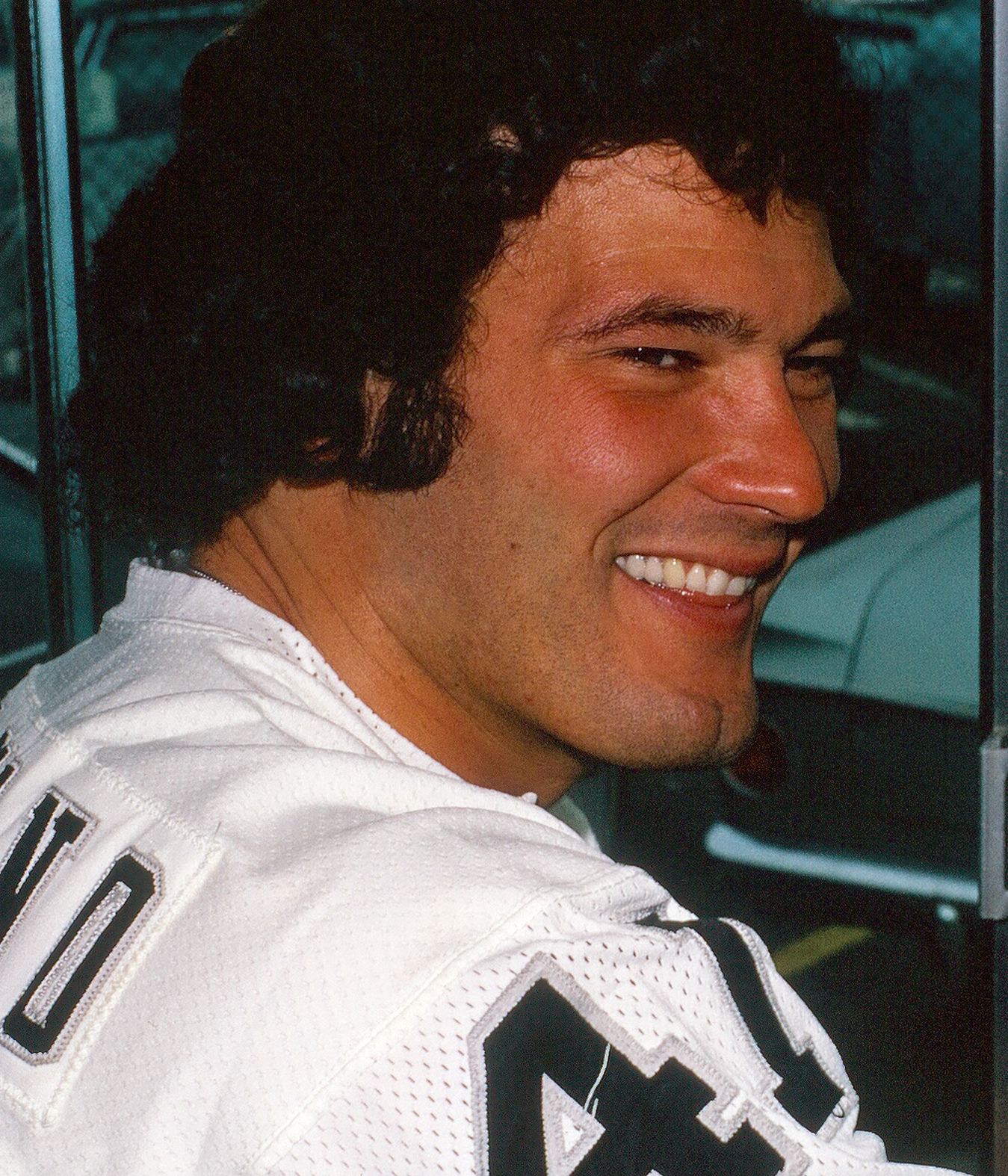

No. 41
- Position: Linebacker

Personal information
- Born: February 26, 1949 (age 77); Long Branch, New Jersey, U.S.
- Listed height: 6 ft 2 in (1.88 m)
- Listed weight: 225 lb (102 kg)

Career information
- High school: Ocean Township (Ocean Township, New Jersey)
- College: Bowling Green (1967–1970)
- NFL draft: 1971: 2nd round, 45th overall pick

Career history
- Oakland Raiders (1971–1979); Buffalo Bills (1980–1983)

Awards and highlights
- Super Bowl champion (XI); 2× First-team All-Pro (1975, 1976); 4× Pro Bowl (1973–1976)

Career NFL statistics
- Interceptions: 11
- Touchdowns: 1
- Stats at Pro Football Reference

Philip James Villapiano (born February 26, 1949) is an American former professional football player who was a linebacker for 13 seasons in the National Football League (NFL). He played college football for the Bowling Green Falcons.

== Early life and college ==
Villapiano played high school football at both Asbury Park High School and Ocean Township High School in Monmouth County, New Jersey. He played college football at Bowling Green State University, and while there was selected as Mid-America Conference Player of the Year.

== Professional career ==
Villapiano was known for his pass coverage and his long friendship with Pittsburgh Steelers Hall of Fame inductee Franco Harris and was a defender in one of the top plays in the history of the NFL, in 1972, a play known as the "Immaculate Reception". Villapiano was the linebacker assigned to cover Franco Harris during that play on December 23, 1972.

One of the fastest linebackers of his era, Villapiano specialized in making big plays - none bigger than his momentum changing goal-line tackle against the Minnesota Vikings in Super Bowl XI, where he forced the fumble that was recovered by Willie Hall.

In March 2018, Villapiano was inducted into the Reese's Senior Bowl Hall of Fame. The next month he was voted as the Jersey Shore's Greatest Sports Personality Winner. He was also selected as a 2019 Senior Class candidate for the Pro Football Hall of Fame.

== Personal life ==
Villapiano has three children; Andrea, Phil, and Michael. Michael was a quarterback at Brown University. His wife, Susan, died of breast cancer on November 22, 2016.

His nephew, Joe Villapiano, is a college football coach and has been the offensive coordinator at Cornell University since 2017.

== Activities after playing career ==
In January 2018, Villapiano was recognized as a candidate for the Pro Football Hall of Fame in Canton, Ohio. In March, he was named to the Hall of Fame for the College Senior Bowl in Mobile, AL. Later in the summer, he was named the Greatest Sports Personality for the Jersey Shore. As a 2019 Senior Class candidate for the Pro Football Hall of Fame, Villapiano has achieved acknowledgement as a solid finalist and is considered a strong candidate for future induction.

In March 2018, Villapiano joined with former NFL stars Harry Carson and Nick Buoniconti to support a parent initiative called Flag Football Under 14, which recommends no tackle football below that age out of a concern for the brain health of the young players. He said, "At some point, those of us who have had success in this game must speak up to protect both football players and the future of the game, and supporting 'Flag Football Under 14' is our best way to do that."

He was inducted into the Italian Hall of Fame and is a candidate for induction into the NJ State Hall of Fame.

The Villapiano Fan Club consists of members all across the country run by his family and close friends, are always hosting events during Raiders season.

Villapiano has also been actively involved in many philanthropic causes such as Save the Jersey Shore post Hurricane Sandy, an executive in the Jimmy V foundation, and numerous programs in his local community of Rumson, NJ and at his alma mater, Bowling Green State University. In recognition of the 100th anniversary of Bowling Green State University Football, Villapiano and nine other former BGSU football players were inducted into the university's Cast of Honor, recognizing the "Best of the Best" by hanging their names and numbers in Doyt L. Perry Stadium.
