= Bob Davis (quarterback) =

American football player (born 1945)

No. 12, 15
- Position: Quarterback

Personal information
- Born: September 15, 1945 (age 81); Long Branch, New Jersey, U.S.
- Listed height: 6 ft 2 in (1.88 m)
- Listed weight: 205 lb (93 kg)

Career information
- High school: Neptune (Neptune Township, New Jersey)
- College: Virginia
- NFL draft: 1967: 2nd round, 30th overall pick

Career history
- Houston Oilers (1967–1969); New York Jets (1970–1972); New Orleans Saints (1973); Florida Blazers (1974); Philadelphia Bell (1975)

Awards and highlights
- Virginia Cavaliers Jersey No. 12 retired; ACC Player of the Year (1966); 3× First-team All-ACC (1964, 1965, 1966)

Career NFL/AFL statistics
- Passing attempts: 324
- Passing completions: 137
- Completion percentage: 42.3%
- TD–INT: 14–23
- Passing yards: 1,553
- Passer rating: 42.1
- Stats at Pro Football Reference

Robert Ellerslie Davis, Jr. (born September 15, 1945) is an American former professional football player who was a quarterback in the American Football League (AFL) and National Football League (NFL). He played college football for the Virginia Cavaliers. Davis played for the AFL's Houston Oilers, for the NFL's New York Jets and New Orleans Saints, and in the World Football League (WFL) in 1974 and 1975 for the Florida Blazers and Philadelphia Bell. 1974 was his best season as he completed 232 of 413 passes for 2977 yards with 21 touchdowns and 23 interceptions.

Davis played high school football at Neptune High School.

Davis was a resident of the Wayside section of Ocean Township, Monmouth County, New Jersey.

== See also ==
- List of American Football League players
