= Oren Liebermann =

American journalist

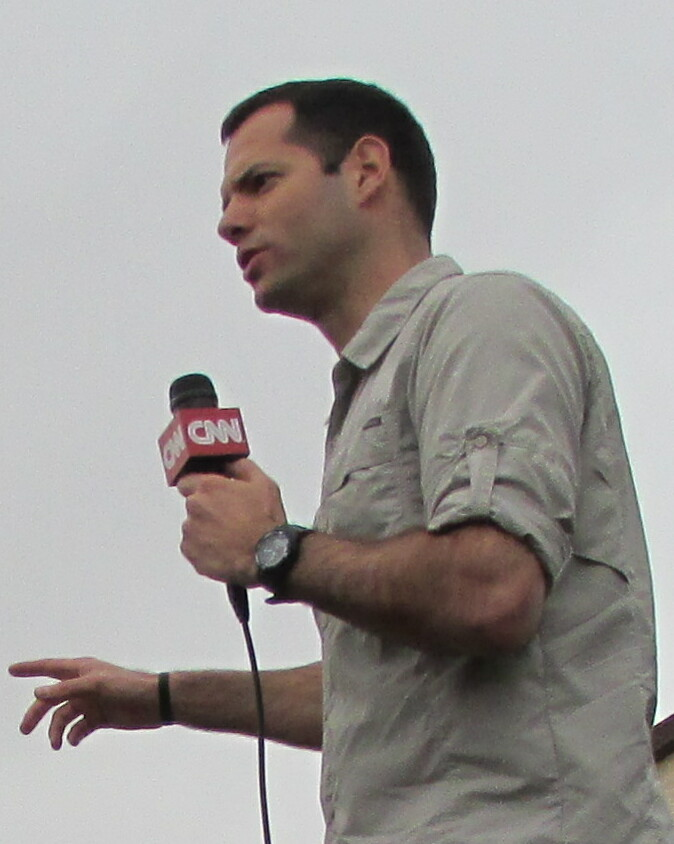
- Liebermann in 2017
- Born: 1982 or 1983 (age 42–43)
- Education: B.A. University of Virginia; M.A. Syracuse University
- Occupation: Journalist
- Spouse: Cassie Kramer

Oren Liebermann is an American journalist who serves as the Jerusalem bureau chief for CNN, and was formerly a Pentagon correspondent for the network.

== Biography ==
Liebermann was born in Virginia on October 13, 1982. He spent his childhood in Virginia and Israel until he was raised in the Wayside section of Ocean Township, Monmouth County, New Jersey, where he attended Ocean Township High School. He speaks English in addition to his first language Hebrew. He graduated with a B.S. from the University of Virginia informational technology and marketing and a M.A. in Broadcast Journalism from Syracuse University. After school, he began his career in radio working as a sports reporter for WINA-AM in Charlottesville, Virginia before moving to television as a reporter for WBOC-TV in Salisbury, Maryland; the Washington, D.C. reporter for WYOU-TV of Scranton, Pennsylvania; and in 2007, he joined WAVY-TV in Norfolk, Virginia. In 2010, he worked as a general assignment reporter for CBS 3 in Philadelphia. In 2015, he joined CNN as their Jerusalem correspondent. During his time as a journalist, he has won two Emmys and three Associated Press awards. He served as a Pentagon correspondent for CNN, and is currently the network’s Jerusalem Bureau Chief.

== Personal life ==
In 2012, he married Allentown-native Cassandra "Cassie" Kramer in an interfaith ceremony. They met while both were working as reporters at WBOC in Maryland. He lives with his wife, daughter and son in Virginia. He has Type 1 Diabetes which only manifested when he was about 30 years old and hiking in Southeast Asia. He serves as an advocate for those who have the condition and has authored a book detailing his experience entitled "The Insulin Express."
