= Bridgette (game) =

Game

Bridgette is a two-player bridge game that has been popular since 1970. It features a 55-card deck: the regular pack of 52 cards plus three extra cards called "colons". These special cards separate the pack into three groups: aces (A) with the grand colon (represented by ••), picture cards (JQK) with the royal colon (represented by •º), and spot cards (2—10) with the common colon (represented by ºº). On an opponent's lead, the colon from the corresponding group may be played instead of following suit. The colon so played loses, but forces the opponent to lead one of the other three suits to the next trick. The colons' skill is quite subtle and the addition of these cards makes up for there being only two cards to a trick, instead of four cards as in the game of standard bridge.

According to an article in the July 1970 issue of the magazine The Bridge World (pp. 14–16), Bridgette was invented by Joel D. Gaines, a teacher at Punahou School in Honolulu. The article, written by Waldemar von Zedtwitz, a famous bridge player, goes on to qualify that responsibility: Bridgette "was streamlined and polished in the course of several years, with the writer's assistance."

However, Gaines changed his name to Joli Quentin Kansil, and is the designer of 36 card games, word games, board games and dice games, and published through his company Gamut of Games, Inc. (later Xanadu Leisure, Ltd.). In 1986, Bridgette was added to GAMES Magazine's Hall of Fame. The magazine's stated criteria for the Hall of Fame encompass "games that have met or exceeded the highest standards of quality and play value and have been continuously in production for at least 10 years; i.e., classics."

In 2002, Kansil completed work on a variation of Bridgette called 'Bridgette Showdown', and this game was introduced to the public in 2004. Bridgette Showdown uses additional equipment, notably bidding boards, dice, dice cups, and chips. All Bridgette games sold today contain both the Showdown variation and the classic game.

== Reviews ==
- Games #30
- 1983 Games 100
- 1984 Games 100
- Games & Puzzles
