= Adam Sarafian =

American geologist (born 1986)

Adam Sarafian (born March 26, 1986) is an American geologist who has advanced theories about the origin of water on Earth. As a pole vaulter, he set the New Jersey state high school record and won the national championship in 2004.

== Sport ==
A native of Ocean Township, Monmouth County, New Jersey and student at Ocean Township High School, Sarafian won the national championship in the pole vault with a jump measuring 16 ft 0 3/4 in (4.89 m), which he accomplished after three jumps at the 2004 Adidas Outdoor Track and Field Championships in Raleigh, North Carolina. Sarafian won the pole vault competition at the Golden West Invitational in 2004 with a vault of 16 ft 10 1/4 in (5.13 m). In May 2004, Sarafian had a jump of 17 ft 4 1/2 in (5.29 m) at the Shore Conference track and field championship, which was the highest of any American that year and the 20th-highest jump by any jumper from the United States to that point. The jump also set the New Jersey state record, breaking a mark of 16 ft 6 in (5.02 m) that had been set in 1980. As of August 2021, Sarafian still holds the state high school record.

== Science ==
A resident of Long Branch, New Jersey, he chose geology as his major at the University of Georgia, which he attended on an athletic scholarship. Sarafian has published a theory that has appeared in Science that the water on Earth is derived from asteroid impacts from 4 Vesta shortly after the formation of the Solar System during a time when the Earth was far smaller and hotter that it is now and some 135 million years before previous theories had believed the planet's water had arrived. Sarafian's theory contrasts with theories that had posited that the Earth's water was derived from comet impacts. Sarafian has noted that the chemical composition of water in comets is inconsistent with what is found on Earth and that the deuterium in water in Earth is consistent with the signatures found in asteroids from Vesta fragments that have struck Earth in recent centuries. Sarafian earned a PhD from the Massachusetts Institute of Technology.
