= Joli Quentin Kansil =

American game inventor (1943–2023)

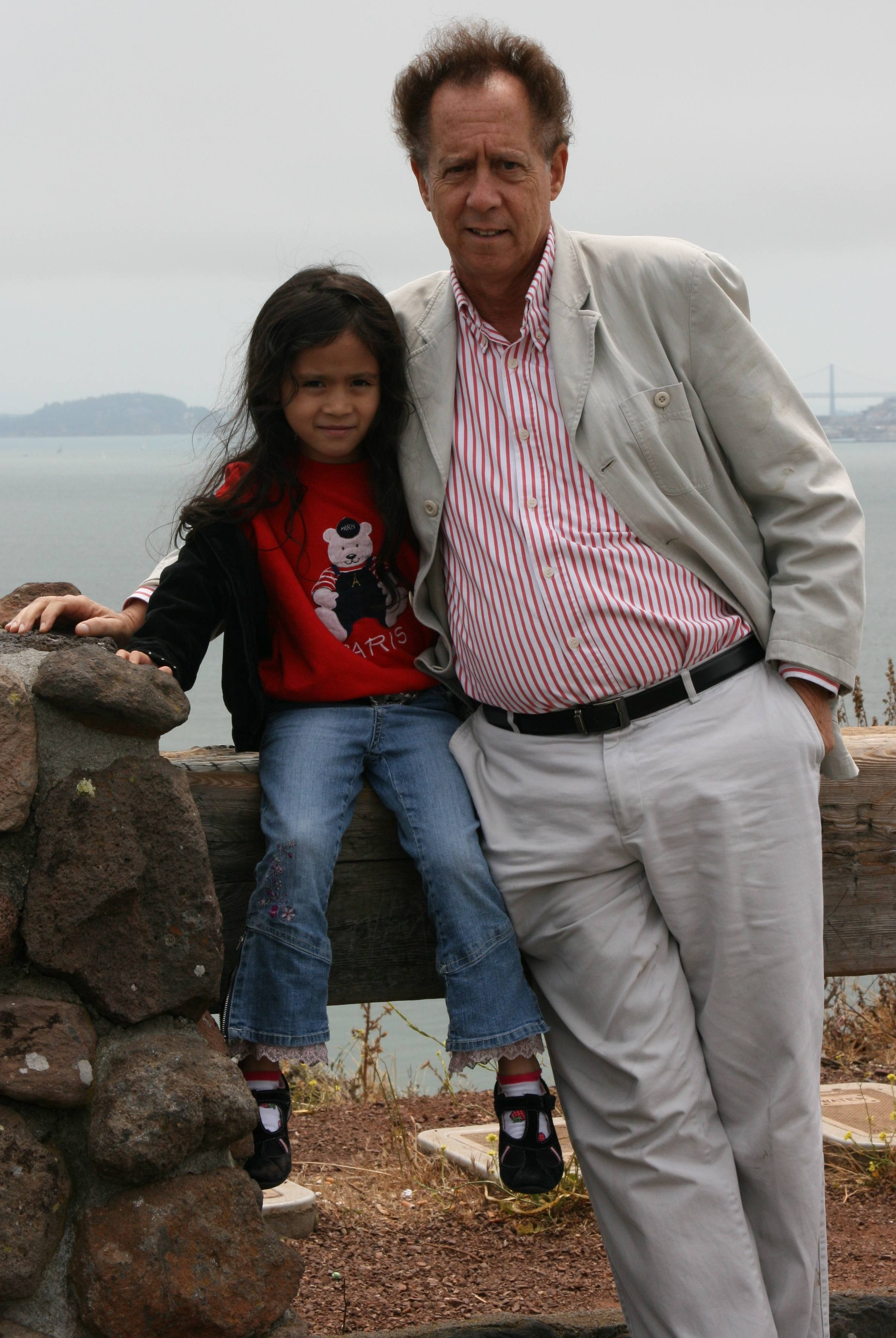
- Kansil (right) at the Golden Gate Bridge, San Francisco, July 3, 2008
- Born: January 27, 1943; Manhattan, New York
- Died: March 27, 2023 (aged 80); Manila, Philippines
- Occupations: Game inventor; Writer; Teacher
- Children: Melanie Quintana Kansil (b. 1976); Zane Quincy Kansil (b. 1992); Xantia Que Kansil (b. 2002)

Joli Quentin Kansil (born Joel Dennis Gaines January 27, 1943 – March 27, 2023) was the inventor of 36 card games, word games, board games, and dice games, and the author of five books. His most famous game is Bridgette, a two-player bridge game. He was also a teacher in Hawaii, Thailand, Vietnam, and Singapore.

== Early life and education ==
Kansil was born in Manhattan and lived much of his childhood at the Jersey Shore, graduating Asbury Park High School in 1960 and Rutgers University in 1964. His first job was as personal assistant to Albert Hodges Morehead, a writer, lexicographer, and the first bridge editor of The New York Times. In 1965 Kansil moved to Mexico City, where he earned an MA degree in Latin American history from la Universidad de las Americas.

== Career ==
After Mexico, he moved to Honolulu, Hawaii and worked as a full-time English teacher at Punahou School. During these years, he began his many travels to Central America, the Caribbean, South Pacific, South East Asia, and other places including Mongolia, Wallis and Futuna Islands, Antarctica and Greenland. In all, he has been to 230 countries and colonies.

=== Games career ===
In 1969, Kansil founded Gamut of Games, Inc. (later Xanadu Leisure, Ltd.) to produce and distribute the games that he and his associate, Philip Orbanes, designed; the games included Bridgette, My Word, Marrakesh, Itinerary, Krakatoa, Knock-on-Word, Montage and others. Through Morehead, Kansil met many famous bridge players including Waldemar von Zedtwitz, a former business partner of Morehead, who played over 30,000 deals of Bridgette and who contributed the funds needed to start Gamut of Games, Inc.

Kansil was honored as Game Inventor of the Year in 1992 at the annual Game Fair in Essen, Germany, and earlier, in 1986, Bridgette was added to GAMES Magazine's Hall of Fame.

In 1973, Kansil co-founded the Hawaii Backgammon Club (now called the Aloha State Backgammon Club), and he promoted this game by organizing many tournaments. He won the Hawaii State Backgammon Championships twice (1973, 2000), and he placed in the top 16 bracket in Macau (1977), Monte Carlo (1979), St. Moritz, Switzerland (1986) and Tokyo, Japan (also 1986). Another famous bridge player, Oswald Jacoby, called Joli Quentin Kansil 'the best combination game inventor/game player in the world'.

== Author ==
Kansil is the author of The Backgammon Quiz Book (Playboy Press, 1979), and he is the editor of the Official Rules of Card Games (U. S. Playing Card Co., 1999). His MA thesis on John Quincy Adams was published in 1983. In 2012 Conversations with Opa was published in New York by Prometheus Books. 'The book covers a wide range of topics, notably the origin of the Universe and life on Earth, the conflict between science and religion, the 10 greatest human accomplishments, contentment, and forecasts for the future.

In the 1970s, Kansil wrote many crossword puzzles for The New York Times, and he was the backgammon editor for Games Magazine (1978 to 1983). A member of the Explorers Club, he was the journalist on the Zancudo-Cocha expedition in Ecuador in 1987, and he made a rare visit to Pitcairn Island in the South Seas that same year. He wrote articles about both trips for the Explorers Club Journal magazine.

== Later years ==
Kansil had three children and was residing in Makati, a prominent city near Manila, in the Philippines, where he was a writer and frequent tournament bridge player. Besides his work in the field of games, he was active as a member of the board of directors of ASH (Action on Smoking and Health) for 17 years, and he designed a modernized spelling system and a reform calendar.

Kansil died on March 27, 2023.
