= Lincoln Township, New Jersey =

Coordinates: 40.254°N 74.050°W

- Township
- Township of Lincoln
- Interactive map of Lincoln Township, New Jersey
- Country: United States
- State: New Jersey
- County: Monmouth
- Incorporated: March 6, 1867
- Dissolved: May 1, 1868

Government
  - Type: Township
- Time zone: UTC-5 (Eastern (EST))
  - Summer (DST): UTC-4 (Eastern (EDT))

Lincoln Township was a short-lived township that existed in Monmouth County, New Jersey, United States, from 1867 until 1868.

The Township of Lincoln was formally incorporated as a township by an act of the New Jersey Legislature on March 6, 1867, from the western portions of Ocean Township.

By another act of the Legislature, effective on May 1, 1868, the township was reannexed to Ocean. Lincoln Township was dissolved after slightly over one year of existence.
