= Asbury Park Public Schools =

School district in Monmouth County, New Jersey, US

Asbury Park School District

Address
- 910 Fourth Avenue Asbury Park, Monmouth County, New Jersey, 07712; United States
- Coordinates: 40.216699°N 74.006661°W

District information
- Grades: PreK to 12
- Superintendent: Mark J. Gerbino (interim)
- Business administrator: Ivy Brown
- Schools: 4
- Affiliation: Former Abbott district

Students and staff
- Enrollment: 1,482 (as of 2024–25)
- Faculty: 147.5 FTEs
- Student–teacher ratio: 10.1:1

Other information
- District Factor Group: A
- Website: www.asburypark.k12.nj.us
Ind.	Per pupil	District spending	Rank (*)	K-12 average	%± vs. average
1A	Total Spending	$30,845	68	$18,891	63.3%
1	Budgetary Cost	28,120	68	14,783	90.2%
2	Classroom Instruction	14,488	68	8,763	65.3%
6	Support Services	6,817	68	2,392	185.0%
8	Administrative Cost	1,824	60	1,485	22.8%
10	Operations & Maintenance	3,942	68	1,783	121.1%
13	Extracurricular Activities	706	67	268	163.4%
16	Median Teacher Salary	69,175	57	64,043
Data from NJDoE 2014 Taxpayers' Guide to Education Spending. *Of K-12 districts with 1,800-3,500 students. Lowest spending=1; Highest=68

Asbury Park Public Schools is a comprehensive community public school district headquartered in Asbury Park, in Monmouth County in the U.S. state of New Jersey, serving children in pre-kindergarten through twelfth grade. The district is one of 31 former Abbott districts statewide that were established pursuant to the decision by the New Jersey Supreme Court in Abbott v. Burke which are now referred to as "SDA Districts" based on the requirement for the state to cover all costs for school building and renovation projects in these districts under the supervision of the New Jersey Schools Development Authority.

As of the 2024–25 school year, the district, comprised of four schools, had an enrollment of 1,482 students and 147.5 classroom teachers (on an FTE basis), for a student–teacher ratio of 10.1:1.

Students from Allenhurst, Deal and Interlaken had all attended the Asbury Park schools through sending/receiving relationships that ended by the 2017–18 school year.

== History ==
In 2009, the board of education voted to rename Bangs Avenue Elementary School in honor of President Barack Obama.

In March 2011, the state monitor overseeing the district's finances ordered that Barack Obama Elementary School be closed after the end of the 2010–11 school year, citing a 35% decline in enrollment in the district during the prior 10 years. Students then attending the school would be reallocated to the district's two other elementary schools, with those going into fifth grade assigned to attend middle school. In 2014, the Barack Obama Elementary School reopened, and Asbury Park Middle School, later renamed Dr. Martin Luther King Jr. Middle School, reverted to serving students only from grade 6–8.

The district had been classified by the New Jersey Department of Education as being in District Factor Group "A", the lowest of eight groupings. District Factor Groups organize districts statewide to allow comparison by common socioeconomic characteristics of the local districts. From lowest socioeconomic status to highest, the categories are A, B, CD, DE, FG, GH, I and J.

In July 2014, the New Jersey Department of Education approved a request by Interlaken under which it would end its sending relationship with the Asbury Park district and begin sending its students to the West Long Branch Public Schools through eighth grade and then onto Shore Regional High School. Loch Arbour and Allenhurst followed Interlaken out of Asbury Park schools and over to West Long Branch and Shore Regional.

Students from Deal had attended the district's high school as part of a sending/receiving relationship that was terminated after the Deal district filed in petition in 2016 and after it was approved was replaced with an agreement with Shore Regional.

With an annual cut in aid of $3.4 million for the 2019-20 school year and more cuts expected in subsequent years, the district was considering a reconfiguration of the district under which Obama Elementary School would be closed, the two remaining elementary schools would serve PreK-3, the middle school would serve grades 4-6 and the high school would cover grades 7-12. The district, which was spending a total cost per pupil of $42,382 in 2017–18, was the subject of an audit in 2019 which found that the district had a capacity to serve 3,095, but an enrollment of 1,862 in 2017–18, a decline from 2,132 nearly a decade earlier. A 2019 audit

Obama Elementary was closed again in 2020 due to a lack of students.

== Schools ==
Schools in the district (with 2024-25 enrollment data from the National Center for Education Statistics) are:

Elementary schools

- Bradley Elementary School with 443 students in grades PreK–2
  - Zakiya Del Orbe, principal
- Thurgood Marshall Elementary School with 345 students in grades 3–5
  - Lauren Schulze, principal

Middle school

- Dr. Martin Luther King Jr. Middle School with 195 students in grades 6–8
  - Kenya Moncur, principal

High school

- Asbury Park High School with 379 students in grades 9–12
  - Perry J. Medina, principal

== Administration ==
As of the 2025–26 school year, the core members of the district's administration are:

- Mark J. Gerbino, acting superintendent of schools
- Ivy Brown, business administrator and board secretary
- Carole Morris, State Monitor

In 2014, interim superintendent Robert Mahon resigned, expressing his frustration with the direction of the district after the board of education had been unable to hire a permanent superintendent; he was one of four superintendents that the district had gone through in a six-year period. Gregory Allen was chosen in July 2014 to succeed Mahon as interim superintendent at that time. Lamont Repollet served as superintendent from October 2014 to January 2018, when he was named to serve as commissioner of the New Jersey Department of Education. In May 2020, Repollet was named president of Kean University in Union, New Jersey.

== Board of education ==
The district's board of education is comprised of nine members who set policy and oversee the fiscal and educational operation of the district through its administration. As a Type II school district, the board's trustees are elected directly by voters to serve three-year terms of office on a staggered basis, with three seats up for election each year held (since 2012) as part of the November general election. The board appoints a superintendent to oversee the district's day-to-day operations and a business administrator to supervise the business functions of the district.
