= Bikini Barbershop =

American reality TV series

- Genre: Reality
- Created by: Dave Goldberg, Rob Cea, Jordan Berman
- Starring: Jeff Wulkan
- Country of origin: United States
- Original language: English
- No. of seasons: 1
- No. of episodes: 14

Production
- Executive producers: Dave Goldberg, Rob Cea, Jordan Berman
- Production location: New Jersey
- Running time: 50 minutes
- Production companies: Killer Bunny Entertainment, Sugar Hit Entertainment, Shorn Industries

Original release
- Network: AXS TV (Formerly HDNET)
- Release: February 19 – September 28, 2012

Bikini Barbershop (Also known as Bikini Barbershop: Jersey) is an American reality show which originally ran on AXS TV during 2012. It featured Jeff Wulkan, a man who ran a hair salon/barber shop in Long Branch, New Jersey called "Bikini Barbers". It mainly consisted of female hair stylists, at work, wearing only bikinis. Following Hurricane Sandy, a drop in business forced the closure of the shop.

== Main characters ==
- Jeff – The owner and CEO of Bikini Barbers. Although he is unfair to his workers and massively sexist, he is extremely focused and single minded. This extends to other aspects of his life including his relentless, and at times, cringe-worthy pursuit of the opposite sex. However he has a clear desire for business success and is very ambitious.
- Ariana – Manager/Hair Stylist. The show focuses a lot on her conflict with Jeff. Ariana, although she comes across as rude and obnoxious at times, is strong and independent. However, Jeff finds her all round attitude highly distasteful. Their constant clashing forms the centerpiece of the show.
- Natalie - Hair Stylist. Attractive and likeable, she is Jeff's favorite employee for her agreeable nature and aesthetic qualities.
- Alissa - Hair Stylist. Somewhat "ditzy" but attractive to look at and inoffensive in nature. She undergoes a breast augmentation procedure during one of the shows.
- Lauren - Hair Stylist. Also undergoes a breast augmentation during the series.
- Kim - Hair Stylist.

== Episodes ==
No.	Title	Original release date
1	"Open for Business"	February 19, 2012
2	"Self Defense"	February 23, 2012
3	"Bachelor Party"	March 1, 2012
4	"Bikini Contest"	March 8, 2012
5	"Ariana"	March 15, 2012
6	"Date Breaker"	March 22, 2012
7	"Atlantic City"	March 29, 2012
8	"Sugar Daddy"	April 5, 2012
9	"Boob Job"	April 12, 2012
10	"Hostile Takeover"	April 19, 2012
11	"Wax On Wax Off"	April 26, 2012
12	"Investor Invasion"	May 3, 2012
13	"Party Crasher"	May 10, 2012
14	"Best of: Jeff"	September 28, 2012
