= Ocean Township, Monmouth County, New Jersey =

Township in Monmouth County, New Jersey, US

Ocean Township, New Jersey
- Township
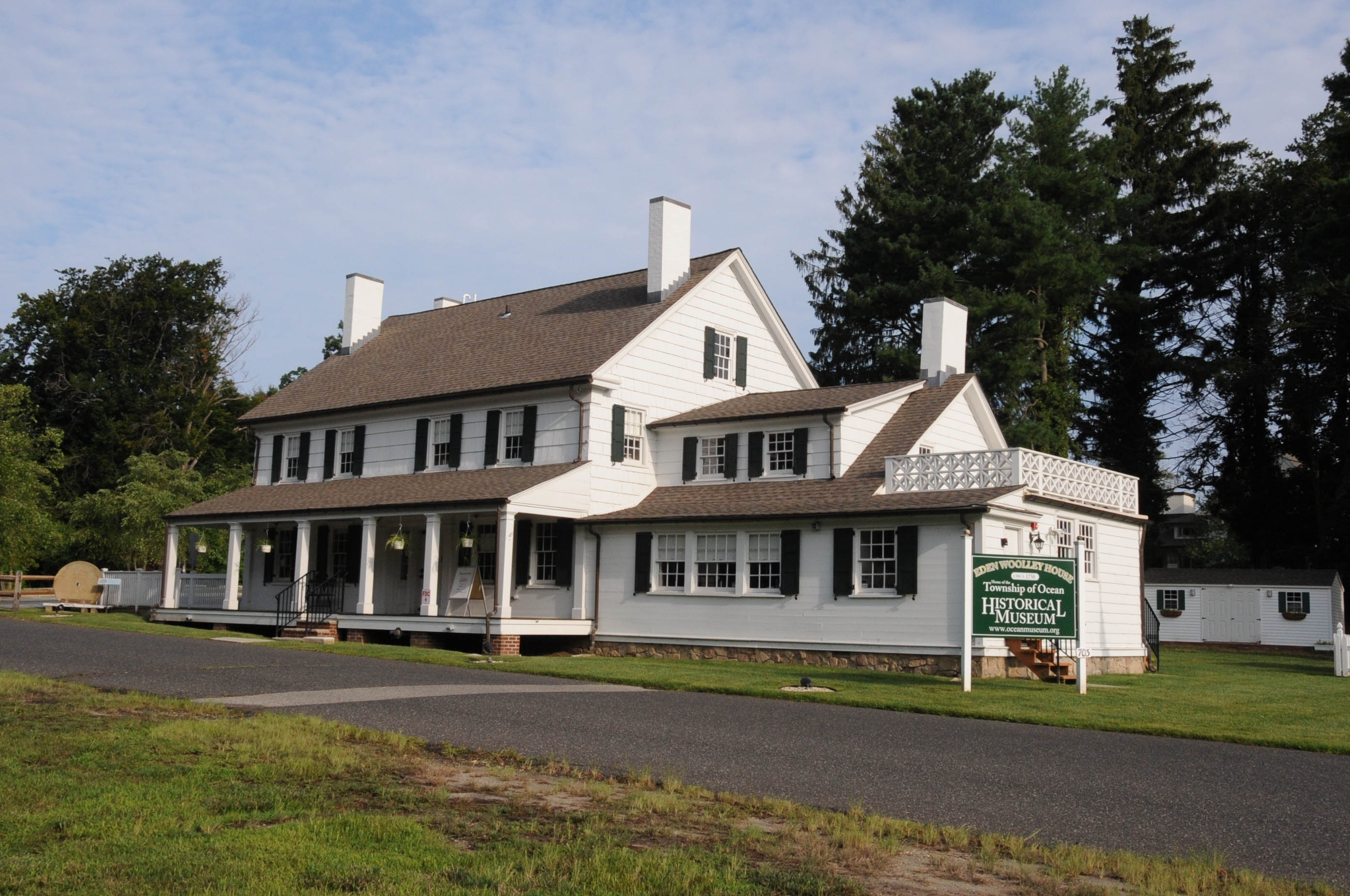
- Township of Ocean Historical Museum in Oakhurst

- Seal
- Motto: The Community of Gracious Living
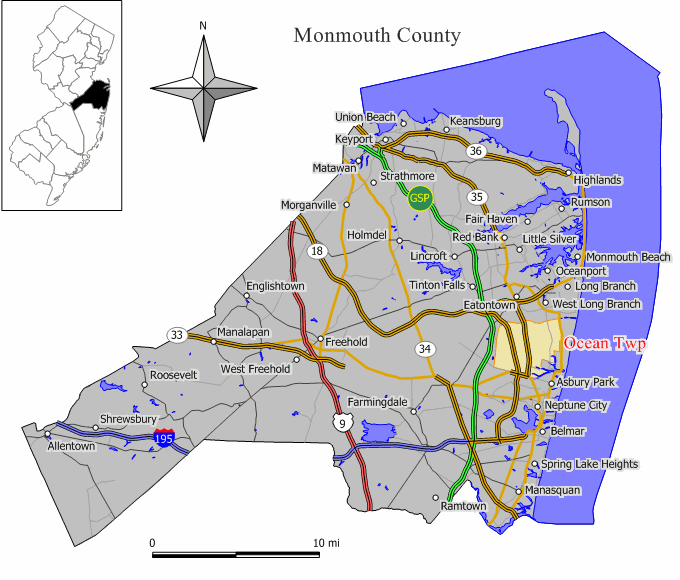
- Location of Ocean Township in Monmouth County highlighted in yellow (right). Inset map: Location of Monmouth County in New Jersey highlighted in black (left).

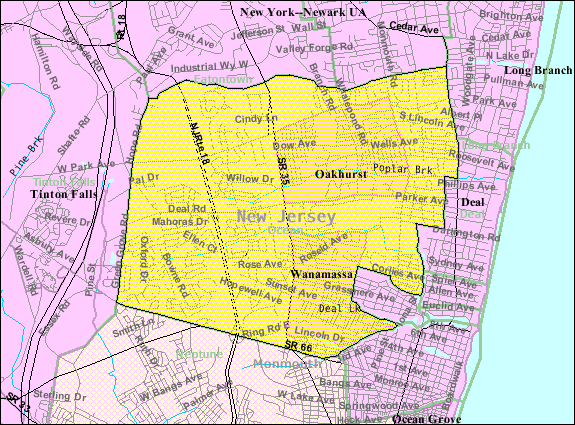
- Census Bureau map of Ocean Township, Monmouth County, New Jersey

- Location in Monmouth County Location in New Jersey Location in the United States
- Coordinates: 40.254412°N 74.031937°W
- Country: United States
- State: New Jersey
- County: Monmouth
- Incorporated: February 21, 1849

Government
  - Type: Faulkner Act (council–manager)
  - Body: Township Council
  - Mayor: John P. Napolitani Sr. (term ends June 30, 2027)
  - Administrator: David G. Brown II
  - Municipal clerk: Jessie M. Joseph

Area
  - Total: 10.99 sq mi (28.47 km^{2})
  - Land: 10.87 sq mi (28.15 km^{2})
  - Water: 0.12 sq mi (0.32 km^{2}) 1.14%
  - Rank: 202nd of 565 in state 13th of 53 in county
- Elevation: 66 ft (20 m)

Population (2020)
  - Total: 27,672
  - Estimate (2023): 27,796
  - Rank: 90th of 565 in state 8th of 53 in county
  - Density: 2,546.4/sq mi (983.2/km^{2})
  - Rank: 248th of 565 in state 30th of 53 in county
- Time zone: UTC−05:00 (Eastern (EST))
  - Summer (DST): UTC−04:00 (Eastern (EDT))
- ZIP Code: 07712 - Ocean Township; 07755 - Oakhurst
- Area code: 732
- FIPS code: 3402554270
- GNIS feature ID: 0882601
- Website: www.oceantwp.org

Ocean Township is a township situated on the Jersey Shore in east central Monmouth County, within the U.S. state of New Jersey. Ocean Township has no central downtown and consists of three main unincorporated communities: Oakhurst, Wanamassa, and Wayside. The township is divided into two ZIP codes, 07755 (Oakhurst) and 07712 (Wanamassa and Wayside). Small portions have Allenhurst (07711), Deal (07723) and Long Branch (07740) ZIP codes.

As of the 2020 United States census, the township's population was 27,672, its highest decennial count ever and an increase of 381 (+1.4%) from the 27,291 recorded at the 2010 census, which in turn reflected an increase of 332 (+1.2%) from the 26,959 counted in the 2000 census.

== History ==
The township was created by an act of the New Jersey Legislature on February 21, 1849, from portions of Shrewsbury Township, at which time the newly formed township stretched from the Shrewsbury River to the southern tip of Avon-by-the-Sea. Portions of the township were since taken to form Lincoln Township (March 6, 1867; reannexed to Ocean Township effective May 1, 1868), Long Branch (April 11, 1867), Eatontown (April 4, 1873), Asbury Park (March 26, 1874), Neptune Township (February 26, 1879), Sea Bright (March 21, 1889), Allenhurst (April 26, 1897), Deal (March 7, 1898), Monmouth Beach (March 9, 1906), Interlaken (March 11, 1922), and Loch Arbour (April 23, 1957). The township derives its name from its original seaside location.

== Geography ==
According to the U.S. Census Bureau, the township had a total area of 10.99 square miles (28.47 km^{2}), including 10.87 square miles (28.15 km^{2}) of land and 0.13 square miles (0.32 km^{2}) of water (1.14%).

Oakhurst (2020 Census population of 4,069) and Wanamassa (4,344) are unincorporated communities and census-designated places (CDPs) located within Ocean Township.

Other unincorporated communities, localities and place names located partially or completely within the township include Cold Indian Spring Lake, Colonial Terrace, Deal Lake, Deal Park, Dogs Corners, Edgemere, Elberon Park, Green Grove, Indian Springs, Oakhurst Manor, Poplar, Shadow Lawn Manor, Wayside, Wertheins Corner, West Allenhurst and West Deal.

Deal Lake covers 158 acres (64 ha) and is overseen by the Deal Lake Commission, which was established in 1974. Seven municipalities border the lake, accounting for 27 miles (43 km) of shoreline, also including Allenhurst, Asbury Park, Deal, Interlaken, Loch Arbour and Neptune Township.

The township is bordered by the Monmouth County municipalities of Eatontown and West Long Branch on the north; Long Branch, Deal, Allenhurst and Interlaken on the east; Neptune and Asbury Park on the south; and Tinton Falls on the west.

== Demographics ==
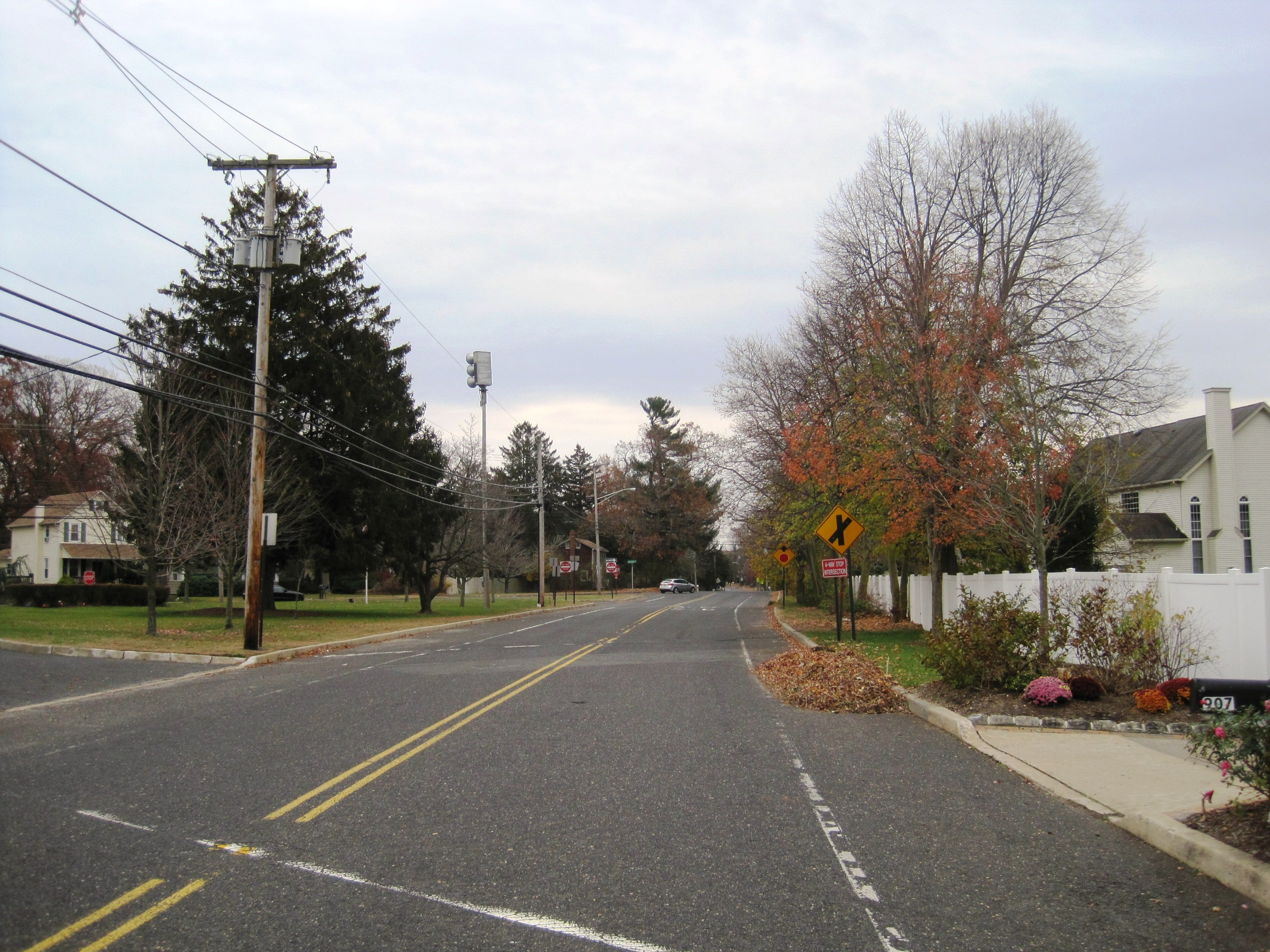
The Wayside residential neighborhood. Located on the border of Ocean and Tinton Falls.

Historical population
Census	Pop.	Note	%±
1850	3,768		—
1860	4,346		15.3%
1870	6,189	*	42.4%
1880	2,194		−64.6%
1890	2,978	*	35.7%
1900	4,251		42.7%
1910	1,377	*	−67.6%
1920	1,581		14.8%
1930	2,892		82.9%
1940	4,200		45.2%
1950	6,734		60.3%
1960	11,622	*	72.6%
1970	18,643		60.4%
1980	23,570		26.4%
1990	25,058		6.3%
2000	26,959		7.6%
2010	27,291		1.2%
2020	27,672		1.4%
2023 (est.)	27,796		0.4%
Population sources: 1850–1920 1850–1870; 1850 1870 1880–1890; 1890–1910 1910–1930; 1940–2000 2000; 2010 2020 * = Lost territory in previous decade.

=== 2010 census ===
The 2010 United States census counted 27,291 people, 10,611 households, and 7,417 families in the township. The population density was 2,509.1 per square mile (968.8/km^{2}). There were 11,541 housing units at an average density of 1,061.1 per square mile (409.7/km^{2}). The racial makeup was 80.66% (22,013) White, 7.96% (2,173) Black or African American, 0.20% (54) Native American, 6.56% (1,791) Asian, 0.05% (13) Pacific Islander, 2.13% (582) from other races, and 2.44% (665) from two or more races. Hispanic or Latino of any race were 8.99% (2,453) of the population.

Of the 10,611 households, 30.1% had children under the age of 18; 54.8% were married couples living together; 10.9% had a female householder with no husband present and 30.1% were non-families. Of all households, 24.9% were made up of individuals and 10.0% had someone living alone who was 65 years of age or older. The average household size was 2.57 and the average family size was 3.09.

22.7% of the population were under the age of 18, 7.7% from 18 to 24, 23.1% from 25 to 44, 31.3% from 45 to 64, and 15.3% who were 65 years of age or older. The median age was 42.8 years. For every 100 females, the population had 93.2 males. For every 100 females ages 18 and older there were 89.7 males.

The Census Bureau's 2006–2010 American Community Survey showed that (in 2010 inflation-adjusted dollars) median household income was $78,806 (with a margin of error of +/− $6,218) and the median family income was $100,682 (+/− $8,339). Males had a median income of $66,774 (+/− $6,581) versus $42,216 (+/− $5,707) for females. The per capita income for the borough was $40,432 (+/− $2,161). About 4.0% of families and 5.9% of the population were below the poverty line, including 3.8% of those under age 18 and 5.8% of those age 65 or over.

=== 2000 census ===
As of the 2000 U.S. census, there were 26,959 people, 10,254 households, and 7,341 families residing in the township. The population density was 2,443.3 inhabitants per square mile (943.4/km^{2}). There were 10,756 housing units at an average density of 974.8 per square mile (376.4/km^{2}). The racial makeup of the township was 84.48% White, 5.67% African American, 0.15% Native American, 6.27% Asian, 0.07% Pacific Islander, 1.58% from other races, and 1.92% from two or more races. Hispanic or Latino people of any race were 4.51% of the population.

There were 10,254 households, out of which 35.4% had children under the age of 18 living with them, 58.3% were married couples living together, 10.3% had a female householder with no husband present, and 28.4% were non-families. 24.0% of all households were made up of individuals, and 8.4% had someone living alone who was 65 years of age or older. The average household size was 2.63 and the average family size was 3.14.

In the township, the population was spread out, with 25.5% under the age of 18, 6.7% from 18 to 24, 29.8% from 25 to 44, 25.9% from 45 to 64, and 12.1% who were 65 years of age or older. The median age was 38 years. For every 100 females, there were 92.9 males. For every 100 females age 18 and over, there were 89.6 males.

The median income for a household in the township was $62,058, and the median income for a family was $74,572. Males had a median income of $52,376 versus $35,439 for females. The per capita income for the township was $30,581. About 3.6% of families and 5.0% of the population were below the poverty line, including 6.1% of those under age 18 and 5.0% of those age 65 or over.

== Parks and recreation ==
Ocean Township has five named parks. The largest, Joe Palaia Park (formerly the Deal Test Site), is the site of the Township's July 4 celebration, and the Italian American Association of the Township of Ocean's annual five-day festival. Joe Palaia Park features many notable amenities, including a disc golf course and a playground. During the COVID-19 pandemic in 2020, the park became known for hosting a Drive-in theater for the community to enjoy, which took place at a small theater located within the park. Ocean Township also contains Weltz Park, an undeveloped parcel of the Monmouth County Park System. Other parks within Ocean Township include Dave Dahrouge Park, which features tennis courts and softball fields, along with Wayside Park, which has basketball courts for public use.

Ocean Township maintains a membership-based pool and tennis club for residents, with the pool open during the summer from Memorial Day to Labor Day.

The township also offers a variety of public buildings for the community to rent out, including the Oakhurst Park Meeting Room. Such facilities provide supplies for a wide variety of events, including appliances and tables.

Ocean Township's Municipal Gym is another notable facility, which features basketball courts on the inside and sports fields on the outside.

== Government ==
=== Local government ===
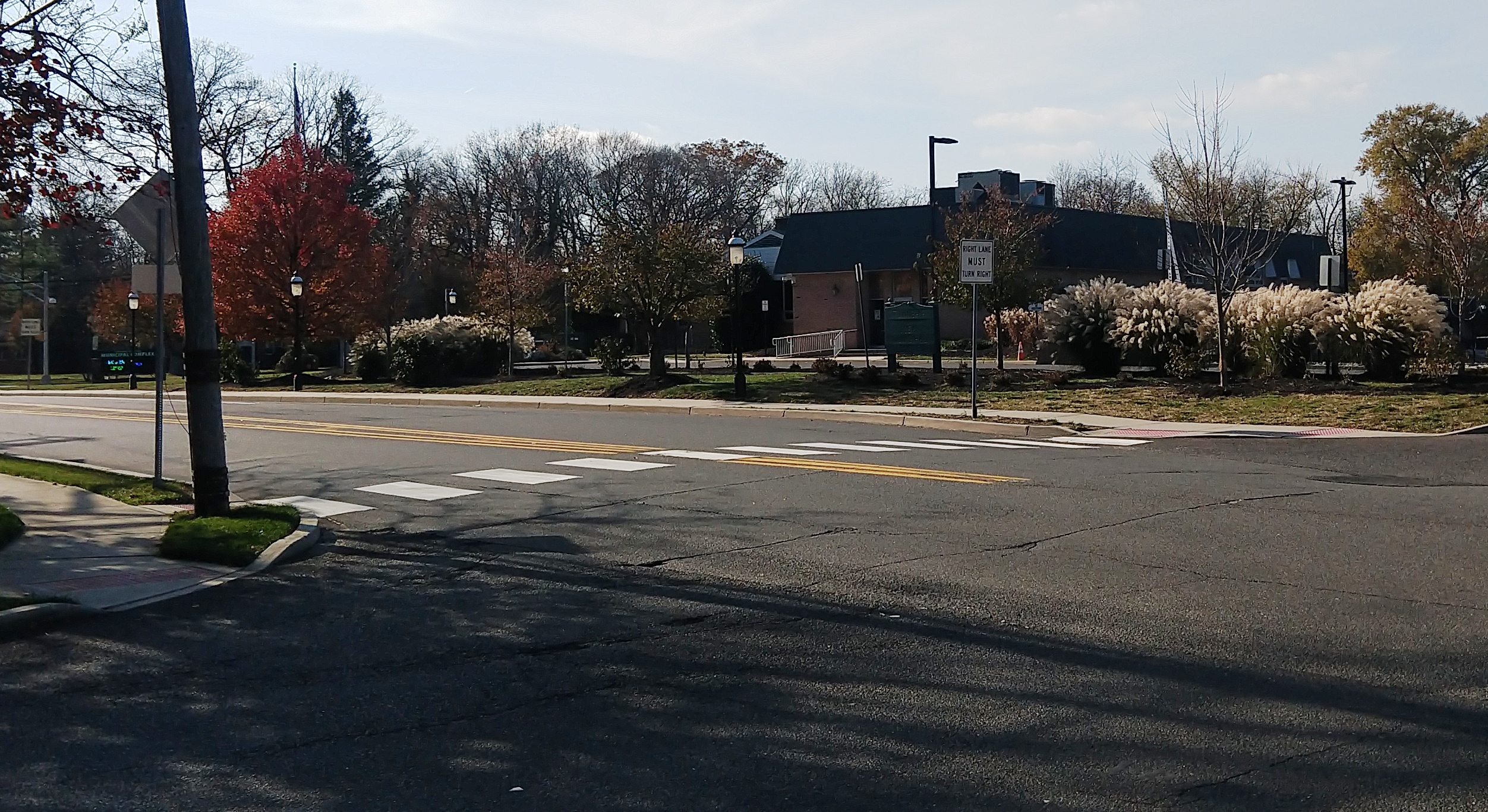
Ocean Township municipal complex

Ocean Township operates within the Faulkner Act (formally known as the Optional Municipal Charter Law) under the Council-Manager form of government (Plan A), implemented based on the recommendations of a Charter Study Commission as of July 1, 1963. The township is one of 42 municipalities (of the 564) statewide that use this form of government. The Township Council is comprised of five members who are chosen at-large by the voters on a non-partisan basis to serve concurrent four-year terms of office in elections held as part of the May municipal election. At an annual reorganization meeting, the Township Council selects one of its members to serve as Mayor. The five-member Council sets policy and adopts local ordinances while the Council-appointed Township Manager oversees the day-to-day administration of the Township. The Mayor presides over the Council and, as a member, has a voice and a vote in its proceedings.

As of 2025, members of the Township Council are Mayor John P. Napolitani Sr., Robert V. Acerra Sr., David J. Fisher, Gitta D. Kaplan (elected to serve an unexpired term) and Jeffrey Weinstein (appointed to an unexpired term), all serving concurrent terms of office ending on June 30, 2027.

In February 2025, Board of Education trustee Jeffrey Weinstein was selected to fill the seat expiring in December 2025 that became vacant when Kelly Terry stepped down from office the previous month. Weinstein will serve on an interim basis until the November 2025 general election, when voters will choose a candidate to serve the balance of the term of office.

Gitta Kaplan was appointed in January 2024 to fill the seat vacated by Margie Donlon after she resigned to take office in the New Jersey General Assembly. In November 2024, Kaplan was elected to serve the balance of the term of office.

Christopher P. Siciliano stepped down as mayor in October 2022 after receiving confirmation as the Monmouth County superintendent of elections. John Napolitani was chosen to fill the vacant mayoral seat and Kelly Terry was sworn in to fill the vacancy on the Township Council the following month.

In January 2017, John Napolitani was chosen to fill the seat vacated by Deputy Mayor William Garofalo when he resigned from office in December 2016; Napolitani will serve on an interim basis until the November 2017 general election, when voters will select a candidate to serve the balance of the term of office.

In the May 2015 municipal election, the One Ocean slate won, with incumbents William Garofalo, Richard Long, Donna Schepiga and Christopher P. Siciliano winning re-election together with Robert Acerra, who won his first term of office.

At its January 1, 2015, meeting, the Township Council chose Christopher Siciliano to fill the position of mayor that was vacated when William Larkin resigned from office the previous November after 24 years on the council and the previous 12 years as mayor. The council appointed Richard Long to fill Larkin's vacant council seat.

In October 2002, former mayor Terrance D. Weldon, who was also the city manager of Asbury Park, pleaded guilty in United States District Court for the District of New Jersey in Newark to taking $64,000 in bribes from developers. His arrest was part of the first phase of a federal investigation known as Operation Bid Rig. On August 25, 2007, after almost five years, Weldon was sentenced to 58 months of prison and assessed a fine of $20,000 by Senior U.S. District Judge William H. Walls.

=== Federal, state and county representation ===
Ocean Township is located in the 4th Congressional District and is part of New Jersey's 11th state legislative district.

For the 119th United States Congress, New Jersey's 4th congressional district is represented by Chris Smith (R, Manchester Township). New Jersey is represented in the United States Senate by Democrats Cory Booker (Newark, term ends 2027) and Andy Kim (Moorestown, term ends 2031).

For the 2026–2027 session, the 11th legislative district of the New Jersey Legislature is represented in the New Jersey Senate by Vin Gopal (D, Long Branch) and in the General Assembly by Margie Donlon (D, Ocean Township) and Luanne Peterpaul (D, Long Branch).

Monmouth County is governed by a Board of County Commissioners composed of five members who are elected at-large to serve three-year terms of office on a staggered basis, with either one or two seats up for election each year as part of the November general election. At an annual reorganization meeting held in the beginning of January, the board selects one of its members to serve as director and another as deputy director.

As of 2025, Monmouth County's Commissioners are Director Thomas A. Arnone (R, Neptune City, 2025), Susan M. Kiley (R, Hazlet Township, 2027), Erik Anderson (R, Shrewsbury, 2026), Nick DiRocco (R, Wall Township, 2025), and Deputy Director Ross F. Licitra (R, Marlboro Township, 2026).

Constitutional officers elected on a countywide basis are Clerk Christine Giordano Hanlon (R, 2025; Ocean Township), Sheriff Shaun Golden (R, 2025; Howell Township) and Surrogate Rosemarie D. Peters (R, 2026; Middletown Township).

=== Politics ===
United States presidential election results for Ocean Township
Year	Republican		Democratic		Third party(ies)	
Year	No.	%	No.	%	No.	%
2024	7,377	49.69%	7,231	48.70%	239	1.61%
2020	7,422	45.54%	8,681	53.27%	193	1.18%
2016	6,759	49.30%	6,848	49.95%	103	0.75%
2012	6,326	48.34%	6,621	50.59%	140	1.07%
2008	6,737	47.58%	7,287	51.47%	134	0.95%
2004	6,941	50.39%	6,721	48.79%	112	0.81%
2000	4,792	40.14%	6,681	55.97%	464	3.89%
1996	4,135	37.25%	6,030	54.31%	937	8.44%
1992	4,618	41.09%	4,773	42.47%	1,848	16.44%

As of March 2011, there were a total of 18,379 registered voters in Ocean Township, of which 4,936 (26.9%) were registered as Democrats, 3,813 (20.7%) were registered as Republicans and 9,621 (52.3%) were registered as Unaffiliated. There were 9 voters registered as Libertarians or Greens.

In the 2012 presidential election, Democrat Barack Obama received 50.6% of the vote (6,621 cast), ahead of Republican Mitt Romney with 48.3% (6,326 votes), and other candidates with 1.1% (140 votes), among the 13,185 ballots cast by the township's 19,049 registered voters (98 ballots were spoiled), for a turnout of 69.2%. In the 2008 presidential election, Democrat Barack Obama received 50.7% of the vote (7,278 cast), ahead of Republican John McCain with 46.9% (6,737 votes) and other candidates with 0.9% (134 votes), among the 14,364 ballots cast by the township's 19,444 registered voters, for a turnout of 73.9%. In the 2004 presidential election, Republican George W. Bush received 50.3% of the vote (6,941 ballots cast), outpolling Democrat John Kerry with 48.7% (6,721 votes) and other candidates with 0.6% (112 votes), among the 13,791 ballots cast by the township's 18,237 registered voters, for a turnout percentage of 75.6.

Local political issues in Ocean Township have included concerns about governmental transparency, debates over the use of the township's open space fund, infrastructure maintenance, management of the growing deer population, and overdevelopment. Several community organizations have been established in response to these issues, including Complete Streets Ocean Township established by local Maura Gtz, which advocates for improved road safety, and Ocean Township Action, founded by resident Jonah Blumenfeld to address overdevelopment and promote transparency in local government.

Gubernatorial election results for Ocean Township
Year	Republican		Democratic		Third party(ies)	
Year	No.	%	No.	%	No.	%
2025	5,761	47.86%	6,212	51.61%	63	0.52%
2021	5,250	50.81%	4,981	48.21%	101	0.98%
2017	4,240	49.30%	4,219	49.06%	141	1.64%
2013	5,335	67.58%	2,456	31.11%	103	1.30%
2009	5,314	57.00%	3,324	35.66%	684	7.34%
2005	4,216	46.79%	4,456	49.46%	338	3.75%

In the 2013 gubernatorial election, Republican Chris Christie received 67.6% of the vote (5,335 cast), ahead of Democrat Barbara Buono with 31.1% (2,456 votes), and other candidates with 1.3% (103 votes), among the 7,995 ballots cast by the township's 19,142 registered voters (101 ballots were spoiled), for a turnout of 41.8%. In the 2009 gubernatorial election, Republican Chris Christie received 56.7% of the vote (5,314 ballots cast), ahead of Democrat Jon Corzine with 35.4% (3,324 votes), Independent Chris Daggett with 6.7% (625 votes) and other candidates with 0.6% (59 votes), among the 9,377 ballots cast by the township's 18,743 registered voters, yielding a 50.0% turnout.

United States Senate election results for Ocean Township1
Year	Republican		Democratic		Third party(ies)	
Year	No.	%	No.	%	No.	%
2024	6,723	48.00%	6,991	49.91%	293	2.09%
2018	5,495	48.38%	5,509	48.50%	354	3.12%
2012	6,055	49.24%	6,032	49.05%	210	1.71%
2006	4,022	47.45%	4,270	50.38%	184	2.17%

United States Senate election results for Ocean Township2
Year	Republican		Democratic		Third party(ies)	
Year	No.	%	No.	%	No.	%
2020	7,407	46.10%	8,386	52.19%	275	1.71%
2014	3,214	49.39%	3,198	49.14%	96	1.48%
2013	2,433	47.42%	2,653	51.71%	45	0.88%
2008	6,127	47.04%	6,596	50.64%	302	2.32%

== Education ==
Public school students in pre-kindergarten through twelfth grade in Ocean Township are served by the Ocean Township School District. As of the 2023–24 school year, the district, comprised of five schools, had an enrollment of 3,263 students and 333.7 classroom teachers (on an FTE basis), for a student–teacher ratio of 9.8:1. Schools in the district (with 2023–24 enrollment data from the National Center for Education Statistics) are Ocean Township Elementary School with 392 students in grades PreK–4 (located in Oakhurst), Wanamassa Elementary School with 357 students in grades PreK–4 (Wanamassa), Wayside Elementary School with 590 students in grades PreK–4 (Wayside), Ocean Township Intermediate School with 861 students in grades 5–8 (Wayside) and Ocean Township High School with 996 students in grades 9–12 (Oakhurst). According to U.S. News & World Report, overall academic performance placed Ocean Township High School at the 183rd ranking for high schools in the state for the 2023–2024 school year.

== Transportation ==
=== Roads and highways ===
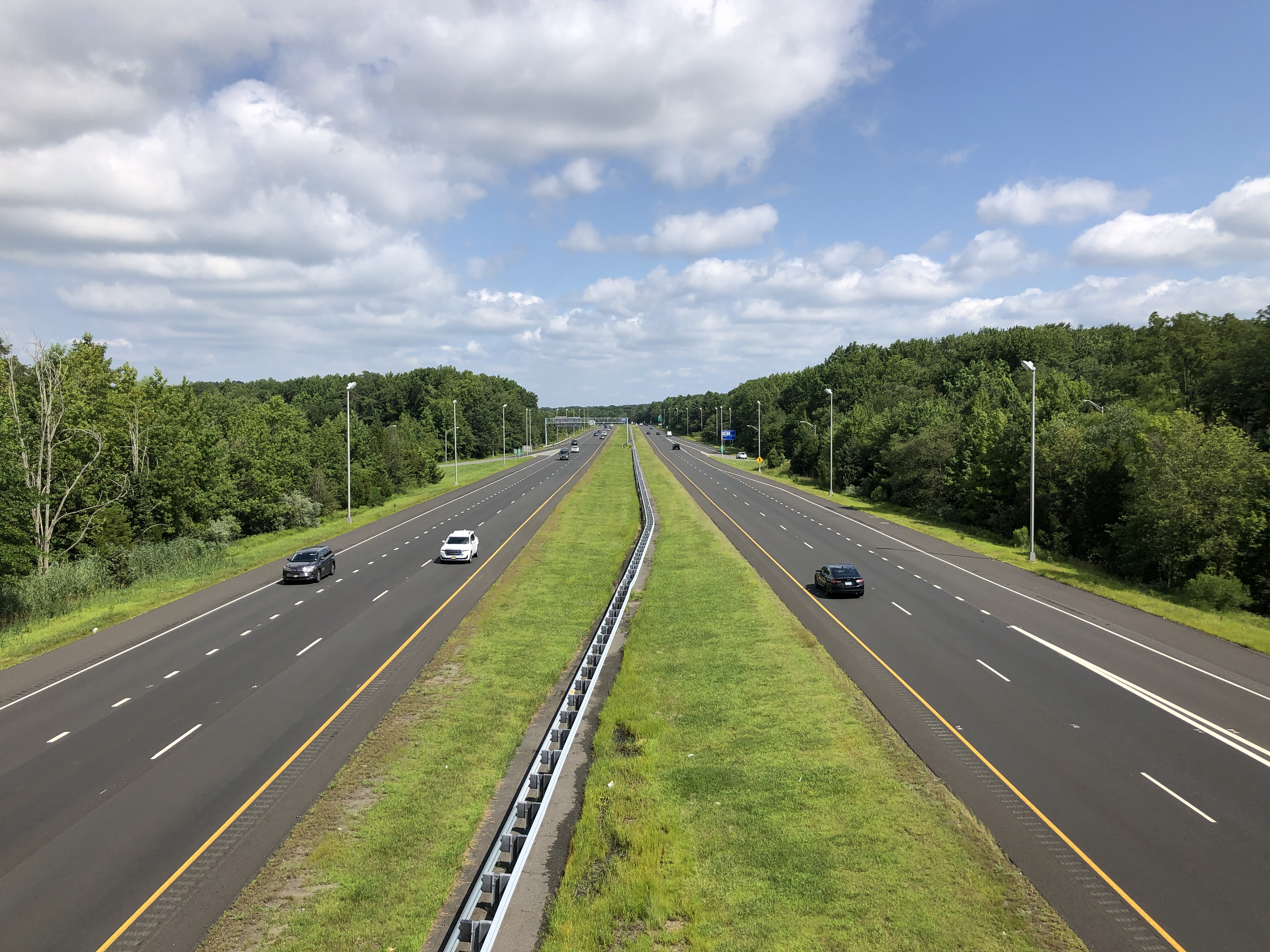
Route 18 northbound in Ocean Township

As of May 2010, the township had a total of 131.98 miles (212.40 km) of roadways, of which 119.74 miles (192.70 km) were maintained by the municipality, 4.56 miles (7.34 km) by Monmouth County and 7.68 miles (12.36 km) by the New Jersey Department of Transportation.

Ocean Township is accessible by several major roads. The Route 18 freeway traverses the western part while Route 35 passes through in the east. Route 66 runs along the southern border with Neptune and Route 71 straddles the eastern border with Deal, West Long Branch, and Long Branch. The Garden State Parkway is located west of Ocean in neighboring Tinton Falls.

Many of Ocean Township's businesses and commercial activities are located on these major roads, including Ocean Commons on Route 35, which features businesses such as Wawa, Inc. Other notable commercial areas located on these major roads include the Seaview Shopping Center (formerly Seaview Square Mall), which is located off of Route 66 and features businesses like a Costco and HomeGoods.

=== Public transportation ===
A brief stretch of NJ Transit's North Jersey Coast Line passes through in the eastern part of the township, but the closest stations are at Allenhurst and Elberon. Commuter service is available on the North Jersey Coast Line south to Point Pleasant Beach and Bay Head or north to points such as Belmar, Long Branch, Newark, Hoboken Terminal and New York Penn Station in Midtown Manhattan.

NJ Transit provides local bus transportation on the 832 and 837 routes.

Ferry service is available through the SeaStreak service in Highlands, a trip that involves about a 25–30 minute drive from Ocean Township (depending on the section of town) to reach the departing terminal. SeaStreak offers ferry service to New York City with trips to Pier 11 (on the East River at Wall Street) and East 35th Street in Manhattan. The ferry service also offers seasonal travel, such as to the public beaches on Sandy Hook, baseball games at Yankee Stadium and Citi Field, trips to Broadway matinees, Martha's Vineyard in Massachusetts, college football games at West Point, fall foliage in the Hudson Valley, and to the Macy's Thanksgiving Day Parade, among other excursions.

== Notable people ==
People who were born in, residents of, or otherwise closely associated with Ocean Township include:

- Mary Pat Angelini (born 1954), member of the New Jersey General Assembly from the 11th Legislative District from 2008 to 2016
- Lou Barbaro (1916–1976), professional golfer
- Marie Castello (1915–2008), fortune teller known as Madam Marie who became widely known after being mentioned in Bruce Springsteen's 1973 song "4th of July, Asbury Park (Sandy)"
- Claude Dauphin (1903–1978), French actor
- Michelle Davidson (born 1970), masters swimmer and a long distance, open water swimmer who accomplished the Triple Crown of Open Water Swimming, which includes crossing the English Channel and Catalina Channel, and circumnavigating Manhattan Island
- Bob Davis (born 1945), former NFL quarterback whose career included three seasons with the New York Jets
- Margie Donlon, former Ocean Township councilmember who represents the New Jersey General Assembly for the 11th legislative district
- Kathleen Dorsett (born 1974), schoolteacher who was convicted of the August 2010 murder of her ex-husband
- Solomon Dwek (born c. 1973), real estate investor who became an FBI informant as part of Operation Bid Rig
- Norma Eberhardt (1929–2011), actress whose films included Live Fast, Die Young and The Return of Dracula
- Caroline Elkins (born 1969), Pulitzer Prize-winning historian and Harvard University professor
- Frank J. Esposito (born 1941), historian and college professor who ran as the lieutenant governor running mate of Christopher Daggett in the New Jersey gubernatorial election, 2009
- Edward J. Hart (1893–1961), represented New Jersey's 14th congressional district, 1935–1955
- Trent Hindman (born 1995), racing driver who won the 2014 Continental Tire Sports Car Challenge in the GS class
- Stephen L. Hoffman (born 1948), physician-scientist, tropical medicine specialist and vaccinologist
- Rowland Hughes (1896–1957), Director of the Office of Management and Budget, 1954–1956
- Oren Liebermann (born 1982/83), journalist who works as the Pentagon correspondent for CNN
- Chris Malachowsky (born 1959), electrical engineer who was a founder of the computer graphics company Nvidia
- Gloria Monty (1921–2006), television producer best known for her work in the field of soap operas, most notably her tenure at General Hospital
- Eric Nies (born 1971), actor, male fashion model, dancer, and singer, best known for being a cast member in the first season of MTV's The Real World
- Jack Nies (born 1937), retired National Basketball Association referee
- John Nies (born 1967), former NFL punter for the Buffalo Bills
- Joseph A. Palaia (1927–2016), member of the New Jersey General Assembly, 1982–1989; member of the New Jersey Senate, 1989–2008
- Paul Palmieri (born 1970), entrepreneur and business leader in the mobile telecommunications and digital advertising industries
- Kenny Pickett (born 1998), American football quarterback who was drafted by the Pittsburgh Steelers
- Sally Priesand (born 1946), first woman ordained by a rabbinical seminary in the United States
- Adam Sarafian (born 1986), national champion pole vaulter in 2004
- Bruce Springsteen (born 1949), musician
- George Stetter (born 1945), Canadian football player who played for the Montreal Alouettes and Ottawa Rough Riders
- Richard R. Stout (1912–1986), politician who served in the New Jersey Senate from 1952 to 1974
- Ashley Tisdale (born 1985), actress, Disney's The Suite Life of Zack & Cody and High School Musical
- Lew Tucker (born 1950), computer scientist, open source advocate and industry executive
- Tommy Tucker (1903–1989), bandleader best known for "I Don't Want to Set the World on Fire"
- Jeffrey K. Tulis (born 1950), political scientist known for work that conjoins the fields of American politics, political theory, and public law
- Michael Uslan (born 1951), originator and executive producer of the Batman movies
- John Villapiano (born 1951), former professional football player who played in the World Football League; politician who served on the Monmouth County, New Jersey Board of Chosen Freeholders and the New Jersey General Assembly
- Phil Villapiano (born 1949), NFL linebacker who played for the Oakland Raiders
- Brett Wigdortz (born 1973), founder and CEO of Teach First
- Wendy Williams (born 1964), talk show host and author host of The Wendy Williams Show
