= Henry Kranzler =

American psychiatrist

- Born: February 11, 1950 (age 76); Newark, New Jersey, U.S.
- Education: Monmouth University (BA); Rutgers University (MA, MD)
- Known for: Research on addiction medicine
- Children: 3
- Awards: James H. Tharp Award for Alcoholism Research from the American Society of Addiction Medicine (2014)
- Scientific career
- Fields: Psychiatry
- Institutions: University of Connecticut; University of Pennsylvania

Henry Richard Kranzler (born February 11, 1950) is an American psychiatrist who serves as a professor of psychiatry and Director of the Center for Studies of Addiction at the Perelman School of Medicine of the University of Pennsylvania, where he has worked since 2010. He previously was Professor of Psychiatry and Genetics and Developmental Biology at the University of Connecticut. His research focuses on addiction medicine, especially genetic and pharmacological aspects of alcohol use disorder and other substance use disorders. From 2014 to 2024, he was the editor-in-chief of Alcohol: Clinical and Experimental Research, the official journal of the Research Society on Alcohol and the International Society of Biomedical Research on Alcoholism.

== Early life and education ==
Born in Newark, New Jersey, Kranzler attended Shore Regional High School in West Long Branch, New Jersey, and went on to earn a Bachelor of Arts from Monmouth University and a Master of Arts from Rutgers University before earning an MD from Robert Wood Johnson Medical School.
