= Kids Kicking Cancer =

US non-profit organization

Kids Kicking Cancer is an organization devoted to helping children overcome the pain of cancer. It was founded in 1999 by Rabbi Elimelech Goldberg, a black belt in the martial arts and the former rabbi of congregation Young Israel of Southfield, Michigan. The goal of the organization is to teach children to cope with cancer through martial arts and spiritual training.

After a two-year break, their annual golf outing is back At the golf outing there is a silent auction.

== Program goals ==
Kids Kicking Cancer partners with existing local hospitals in different communities to provide individual and group instruction, in the martial arts for children with serious acute and chronic illness – including cancer and sickle cell disease. As a way of making patients feel heroic, they are given martial arts uniforms to wear during treatment. During weekly class sessions, children are taught stretching, breathing exercises, guided imagery and meditation, as well as traditional karate moves. The breathing and guided imagery and meditation techniques have proved to be very effective in reducing a child's anxiety, pain, and discomfort during difficult clinic and hospital procedures.

In March 2012, Goldberg was featured in People magazine in their "Heroes Among Us" feature. In August 2013, Kids Kicking Cancer was featured on Good Morning America. In 2014 Rabbi Goldberg was nominated for the CNN heroes program and as of October 2014 he was a top 10 finalist.

Participating hospitals can be found in California, New York, Florida, Michigan, Ontario, Israel, Italy, and South Africa.
