= Richard Jarecki =

German-born American physician (1931–2018)

Richard Wilhelm Jarecki (December 1, 1931 – July 25, 2018) was a German-born American physician who won more than $1 million from a string of European casinos after cracking a pattern in roulette wheels.

== Early life and education ==
Jarecki was born on December 1, 1931, in Stettin, Germany, now the city of Szczecin in Poland, the son of Gerda (Kunstmann) and Dr. Max Jarecki, a dermatologist. He escaped Nazi Germany with his Jewish family and emigrated to the United States in the late 1930s. He was raised in Asbury Park, New Jersey and attended Asbury Park High School. He attended Duke University and earned a medical degree at Heidelberg University in his native Germany. He married Carol Fuhse, a nursing student at Jersey Shore Medical Center, while he was completing his residency there. The couple moved to Germany where he continued his studies at the University of Heidelberg and began gambling at casinos.

== Gambling ==
In the 1960s and 1970s, Jarecki started visiting casinos across Europe and began working with his wife Carol and others to keep track of tens of thousands of spins of roulette wheels, often over the course of a month. After analyzing the results, Jarecki was able to determine that some wheels had a subtle bias that made it more likely to land on certain numbers due to imperfections and wear, though he created a cover story that he had used a computer at the University of London to crack the games. He preferred to target European casinos, as they used wheels with 37 numbers (unlike the 38-slot wheels prevalent in the United States) and the casinos there were less likely than their American counterparts to cut off a gambler on a winning streak. On occasion, casinos attempted to ban Jarecki from gambling on their premises. After several profitable streaks at the Sanremo Casino in the late 1960s, its managing director described him as "a menace to every casino in Europe" and hoped that Jarecki "never returned to my casino". Even when wheels were changed, Jarecki was able to recognize the unique characteristics of each wheel by sight. The casinos finally caught on to Jarecki's methods and began switching roulette wheels more frequently and worked with manufacturers to make wheels with finer tolerances that were less likely to have the types of imperfections that could lead to exploitable circumstances for Jarecki.

== Later life and death ==
After winning more than $1.2 million using his technique, he returned to the United States in the mid-1970s to become a commodities trader trading in gold and silver, as well as dabbling in blackjack and roulette in casinos in Atlantic City, New Jersey and Las Vegas. A resident of Manila, Philippines, for more than 20 years, Jarecki died there of pneumonia at the age of 86 on July 25, 2018. He was survived by his wife, as well as by two daughters, a son and six grandchildren. His brother, Henry Jarecki, is a physician who became a billionaire trading commodities.
