= Carol Jarecki =

American chess player (1935–2021)

- Born: Carol Fuhse; February 13, 1935; Neptune, New Jersey, U.S.
- Died: June 13, 2021 (aged 86)
- Education: University of Pennsylvania School of Nursing
- Occupations: Chess organizer; chess writer
- Spouse: Richard Jarecki (m. 1964; died 2018)
- Children: 3

Carol H. Jarecki (née Fuhse; February 13, 1935 – June 13, 2021) was an American chess organizer, an International Arbiter, and a chess writer. She served as director or deputy director of many national and international tournaments, including the women’s division of the 40th Chess Olympiad in 2012; the Women’s World Chess Championship 2013; and the U.S. Chess Championship in 2009, 2010, 2011, 2013, 2016 and 2017. She was the arbiter and referee for the 1997 match between Garry Kasparov and the IBM supercomputer program Deep Blue.

== Early life ==
Jarecki was born in Neptune, New Jersey, on February 13, 1935. Her parents owned a chicken farm. After graduating from Asbury Park High School, Jarecki studied anesthesia at the University of Pennsylvania, then became a nurse in New Jersey.

== Chess career ==
Jarecki first became involved with chess as a "ChessMom", taking her son John to chess events across the country; John became the youngest ever chess master in U.S. at the age of 12 in 1981 (a record soon surpassed by a slightly younger Stuart Rachels). She later started working at those tournaments, eventually obtaining certification as a tournament director at the highest National Tournament Director level. She continued directing tournaments after her son retired from competition during his teenage years. Jarecki directed many prestigious chess events: she served as Head Tournament Director at several U.S. Chess Championships, SuperNational Scholastic Championships, National Elementary Championships, and World Opens in Philadelphia, as well as many other national tournaments large and small. She was the chief arbiter at the Bermuda International Open and associated invitationals for over 20 years.

Jarecki was recognized as an International Arbiter by the World Chess Federation (FIDE) in 1984. She regularly worked at the World Chess Olympiad, sometimes as the Head Arbiter. She also served as the Delegate from the British Virgin Islands to the FIDE Congress.

Jarecki was the Chief Arbiter at the PCA World Chess Championship match in 1995 between World Chess Champion Garry Kasparov and challenger Viswanathan Anand, which was held in New York City at the top of the World Trade Center. Jarecki was the arbiter and referee for the second match between Kasparov and the IBM supercomputer program Deep Blue in 1997 in New York City, as well as the two Intel Grand Prix matches held there. She was the head arbiter for the HB Global Chess Challenge, Minneapolis 2005, which had the richest prize fund ($500,000) for an Open tournament in chess history.

== Personal life and death ==
Jarecki was married to physician Richard Jarecki from 1964 until his death in 2018. They had three children: John, Divonne, and Lianna. In the 1970s, she and her husband became known for a very successful run of roulette winnings. They played in casinos in Monte Carlo and Sanremo, using a system on roulette wheels they found biased by mechanical imperfections. The couple won more than $1.2 million (more than $8 million adjusted for inflation in 2021) before a Sanremo casino discovered their scheme and had them barred from returning to Italy. This ban was later overturned.

Jarecki was a licensed pilot, revealing at one point that she had flown for a cumulative total of over 4,200 hours. She lived in Las Vegas and Boulder, Colorado.

Jarecki announced in December 2020 that she had been diagnosed with pancreatic cancer. She died six months later on June 13, 2021, at age 86.

== Books ==
- Official Rules of Chess (Fourth Edition) ISBN 0-8129-2217-4 (with Bill Goichberg and Ira Lee Riddle)
