= Idabelle Yeiser =

American poet and writer

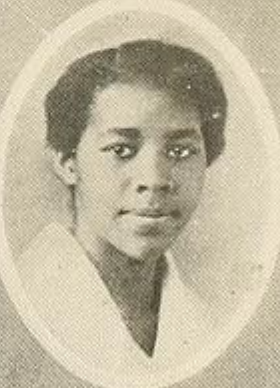
- Idabelle Yeiser, from the 1920 yearbook of Montclair State Normal School
- Born: about 1900
- Died: September 24, 1954
- Occupations: Educator, college professor, writer, poet

Idabelle Yeiser (born c. 1900, died 24 September 1954) was an American woman poet, writer, and educator, who was part of the New Negro Movement in Philadelphia.

== Early life and education ==
Yeiser was the daughter of John G. Yeiser, a pastor in the African Methodist Episcopal Church. She graduated from Asbury Park High School in 1918, and from the New Jersey State Normal School at Montclair in 1920. She earned a bachelor's degree at the University of Pennsylvania, with further studies in Paris and Madrid. In 1940, she earned a doctorate in education at Teachers College, Columbia University. Yeiser was a member of Alpha Kappa Alpha sorority.

== Career ==
Yeiser taught school and private language classes in Camden, New Jersey, and in Philadelphia. She was known for teaching with puppets. She was an education professor at Dillard University from 1943 to 1946, was a professor of education at Cheyney College in 1950, and was an assistant professor of education at Brooklyn College in the 1950s.

In the 1930s, Yeiser was a prize-winning horsewoman in Philadelphia. She was an interviewer with the Mississippi Health Project, working with Melva L. Price and Dorothy Boulding Ferebee, among others. In 1945, she was a consultant to the Oklahoma City Negro Teachers' Institute.

Yeiser was active in the peace movement. She was a member of the Philadelphia chapter of the Women's International League for Peace and Freedom, and in the early 1930s had a newspaper column in the Philadelphia Tribune, titled "Peace Corner." In summer 1947, she was one of six American representatives at a UNESCO seminar in France.

== Works ==
- —— (August 1926). "Echoes of Toulouse, France". The Crisis. 32: 191–192 – via Internet Archive.
- —— (1937). Moods: A Book of Verse. Philadelphia: Colony Press Publishers. OCLC 9358247.
- —— (1939). "The Why and How of Teaching French to Little Children". The Modern Language Journal. 23 (8): 591–593. doi:10.1111/j.1540-4781.1939.tb02850.x. ISSN 1540-4781.
- —— (1943). The Curriculum as an integrating force for ethnic variations. Cambridge, MA: Harvard University. OCLC 494910512.
- —— (1944). "The Teacher Beyond the Textbook". The Southwestern Journal.
- —— (1947). Lyric and Legend. Boston: Christopher Publishing House. OCLC 8926715.
- —— (1949). "Notes on a UNESCO Conference". The Journal of Education. 132 (2): 44–47. doi:10.1177/002205744913200207. ISSN 0022-0574. JSTOR 42749618. S2CID 189044265.
- —— (December 1953). "Two Student Teaching Programs". Journal of Teacher Education. 4 (4): 300–302. doi:10.1177/002248715300400413. ISSN 0022-4871. S2CID 145488427.
- —— (May 1953). "An Essay on Creativity". Arts and Activities. 33: 36–37, 49 – via Internet Archive.

== Personal life ==
Yeiser died in 1954.
