= West Long Branch Public Schools =

School district in Monmouth County, New Jersey, US

Address
- 135 Locust Avenue West Long Branch, Monmouth County, New Jersey, 07764; United States
- Coordinates: 40.289266°N 74.017785°W

District information
- Grades: PreK-8
- Superintendent: Christina Egan
- Business administrator: Corey Lowell
- Schools: 2

Students and staff
- Enrollment: 551 (as of 2021–22)
- Faculty: 61.5 FTEs
- Student–teacher ratio: 9.0:1

Other information
- District Factor Group: FG
- Website: www.wlbschools.com
| Ind. | Per pupil | District spending | Rank (*) | K-8 average | %± vs. average |
|---|---|---|---|---|---|
| 1A | Total Spending | $19,251 | 41 | $18,891 | 1.9% |
| 1 | Budgetary Cost | 15,168 | 40 | 14,159 | 7.1% |
| 2 | Classroom Instruction | 8,947 | 37 | 8,659 | 3.3% |
| 6 | Support Services | 2,313 | 36 | 2,167 | 6.7% |
| 8 | Administrative Cost | 1,813 | 44 | 1,547 | 17.2% |
| 10 | Operations & Maintenance | 1,763 | 46 | 1,612 | 9.4% |
| 13 | Extracurricular Activities | 236 | 57 | 104 | 126.9% |
| 16 | Median Teacher Salary | 58,645 | 27 | 61,136 |
Data from NJDoE 2014 Taxpayers' Guide to Education Spending. *Of K-8 districts with 401-750 students. Lowest spending=1; Highest=64

The West Long Branch Public Schools is a community public school district that serves students in pre-kindergarten through eighth grade from West Long Branch, in Monmouth County, in the U.S. state of New Jersey. Students from Interlaken attend the district as part of a sending/receiving relationship in which students attend on a tuition basis, as do students from Loch Arbour, New Jersey, who began attending schools in West Long Branch starting in the 2017–18 school year, after leaving the Ocean Township School District and those from Allenhurst, after a 2017 decision that terminated a relationship with the Asbury Park Public Schools.

As of the 2021–22 school year, the district, comprising two schools, had an enrollment of 551 students and 61.5 classroom teachers (on an FTE basis), for a student–teacher ratio of 9.0:1.

The district is classified by the New Jersey Department of Education as being in District Factor Group "FG", the fourth-highest of eight groupings. District Factor Groups organize districts statewide to allow comparison by common socioeconomic characteristics of the local districts. From lowest socioeconomic status to highest, the categories are A, B, CD, DE, FG, GH, I and J.

For ninth through twelfth grades, public school students attend Shore Regional High School, a regional high school located in West Long Branch that also serves students from the constituent districts of Monmouth Beach, Oceanport and Sea Bright, together with out-of-district students who pay tuition to attend the school. As of the 2021–22 school year, the high school had an enrollment of 613 students and 55.7 classroom teachers (on an FTE basis), for a student–teacher ratio of 11.0:1.

== Schools ==
Schools in the district (with 2021–22 enrollment data from the National Center for Education Statistics) are:

- Betty McElmon Elementary School with 330 students in pre-Kindergarten through fourth grade
  - James J. Erhardt, principal
- Frank Antonides School with 214 students in fifth through eighth grades
  - Allyson Winter, principal

== Administration ==
Core members of the district's administration are:

- Christina Egan, superintendent
- Corey Lowell, business administrator and board secretary

== Board of education ==
The district's board of education, comprised of nine members, sets policy and oversees the fiscal and educational operation of the district through its administration. As a Type II school district, the board's trustees are elected directly by voters to serve three-year terms of office on a staggered basis, with three seats up for election each year held (since 2012) as part of the November general election. The board appoints a superintendent to oversee the district's day-to-day operations and a business administrator to supervise the business functions of the district.
