= Wayside, New Jersey =

Populated place in Monmouth County, New Jersey, US

- Unincorporated community
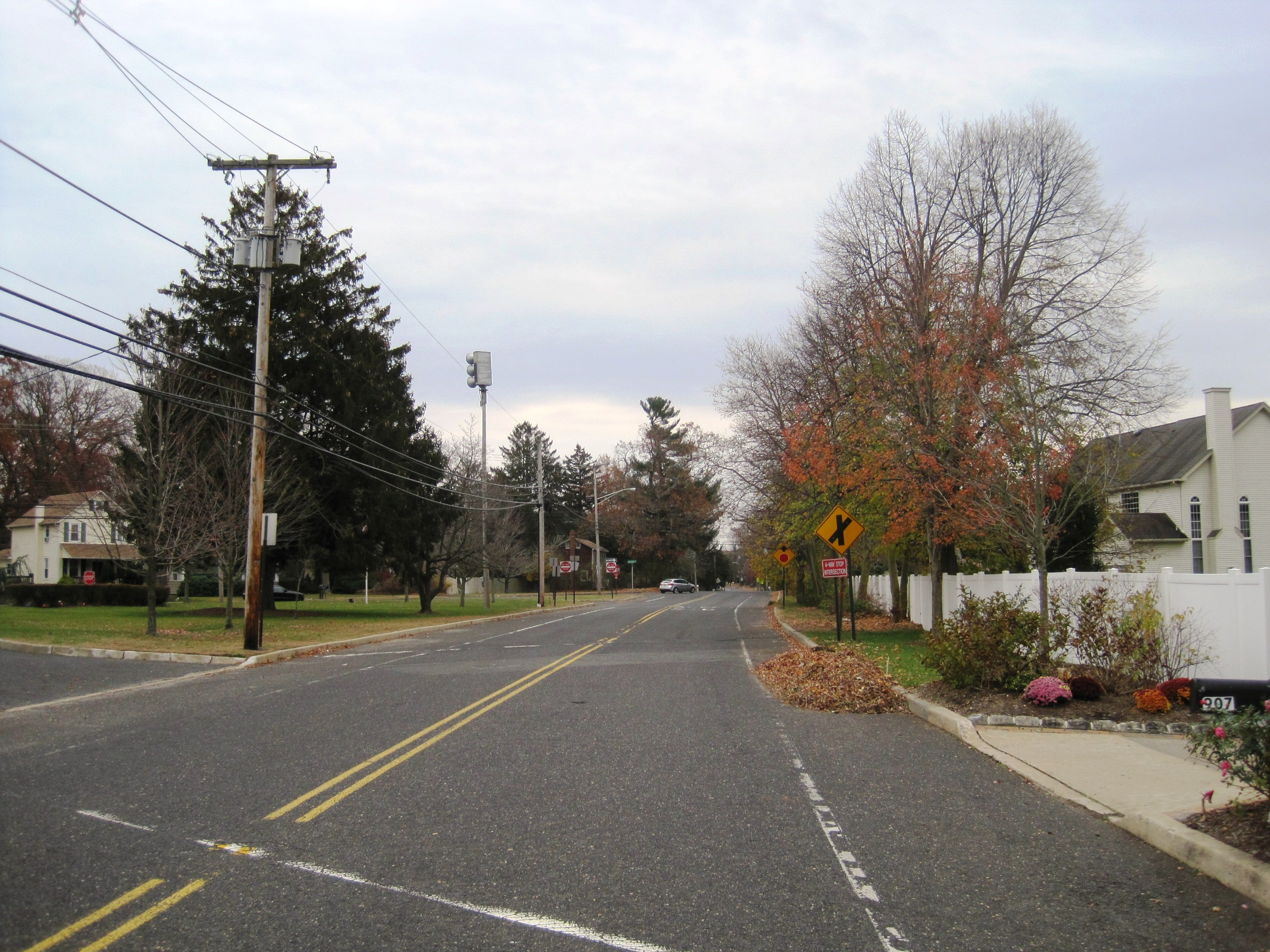
- Along Wayside Road (CR 38)

- Location of Wayside in Monmouth County Inset: Location of county within the state of New Jersey Wayside (New Jersey) Wayside (the United States)
- Coordinates: 40°15′24″N 74°04′29″W
- Country: United States
- State: New Jersey
- County: Monmouth
- Borough and Township: Tinton Falls and Ocean
- Elevation: 128 ft (39 m)
- Time zone: UTC−05:00 (Eastern (EST))
  - Summer (DST): UTC−04:00 (EDT)
- ZIP Code: 07712
- GNIS feature ID: 882591

Wayside is an unincorporated community located along the border of Tinton Falls Borough and Ocean Township in Monmouth County, in the U.S. state of New Jersey. The community is largely residential though some churches, parks, and schools are located in the area. The main arterial roads in the community are Hope Road (through which the Tinton Falls–Ocean Township municipal line runs), Wayside Road (County Route 38 in Tinton Falls), and West Park Avenue. Access to New Jersey Route 18 is available via nearby interchanges with Deal Road, West Park Avenue, and Wayside Road; the Garden State Parkway's exit 105 is also located north of Wayside. The building that once housed the 16-lane Wayside Bowl-O-Drome is still in use, now as an office building.

== Notable people ==
People who were born in, residents of, or otherwise closely associated with Wayside include:

- Bob Davis (born 1945), former NFL quarterback whose career included three seasons with the New York Jets.
- Trent Hindman (born 1995), racing driver who won the 2014 Continental Tire Sports Car Challenge in the GS class.
- Oren Liebermann, CNN International Jerusalem correspondent
- Wendy Williams (born 1964), media personality and former radio jock host of The Wendy Williams Show.
