= St. Peter's Episcopal Church (Freehold Borough, New Jersey) =

Historic church in New Jersey, United States

- U.S. National Register of Historic Places
- New Jersey Register of Historic Places
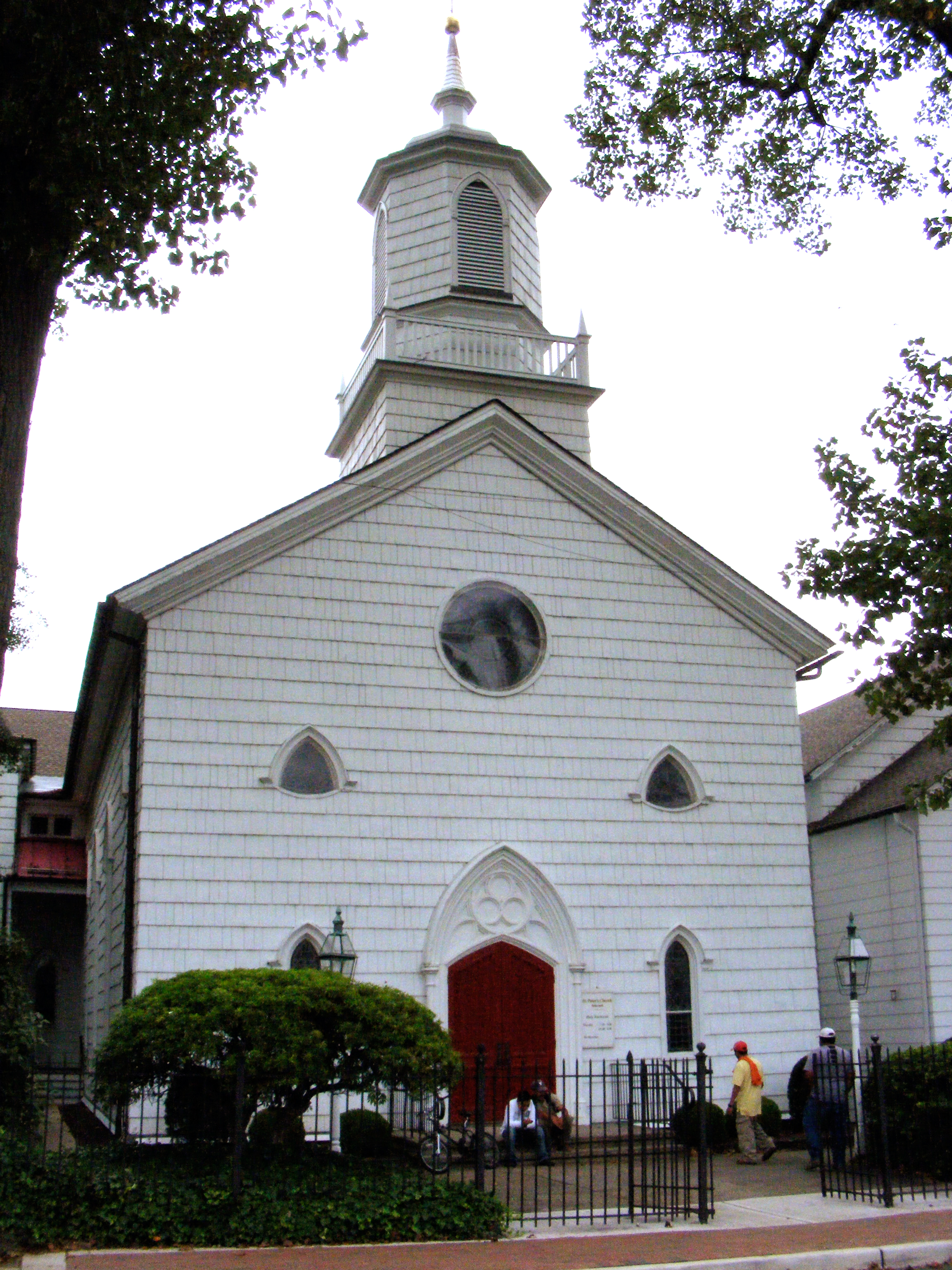

- Location within Monmouth County, New Jersey Location within New Jersey Location within the United States
- Location: 31 Throckmorton Street, Freehold Borough, New Jersey
- Coordinates: 40°15′34″N 74°16′34″W
- Built: 1771
- Architect: Robert Smith
- Architectural style: Georgian, Gothic Revival
- NRHP reference No.: 98000256
- NJRHP No.: 3344

Significant dates
- Added to NRHP: March 19, 1998
- Designated NJRHP: December 22, 1997

St. Peter's Episcopal Church is a historic Episcopal church building located at 31 Throckmorton Street in Freehold Borough in Monmouth County, New Jersey, United States. The building was constructed in 1771 and features Georgian and Gothic Revival elements. The church was added to the National Register of Historic Places on March 19, 1998, for its significance in architecture and religion.

== History and description ==
The congregation was founded in 1702 at the Quaker meeting house in Topanemus, led by George Keith. Thomas Boels bequeathed the meeting house to the congregation. Both Keith and Boels converted to Anglicanism. By 1771, the congregation decided to build a new church building in Freehold. It was designed by the architect Robert Smith, who also designed Nassau Hall at Princeton University.

== See also ==
- National Register of Historic Places listings in Monmouth County, New Jersey
