= Court Street School =

- U.S. National Register of Historic Places
- New Jersey Register of Historic Places
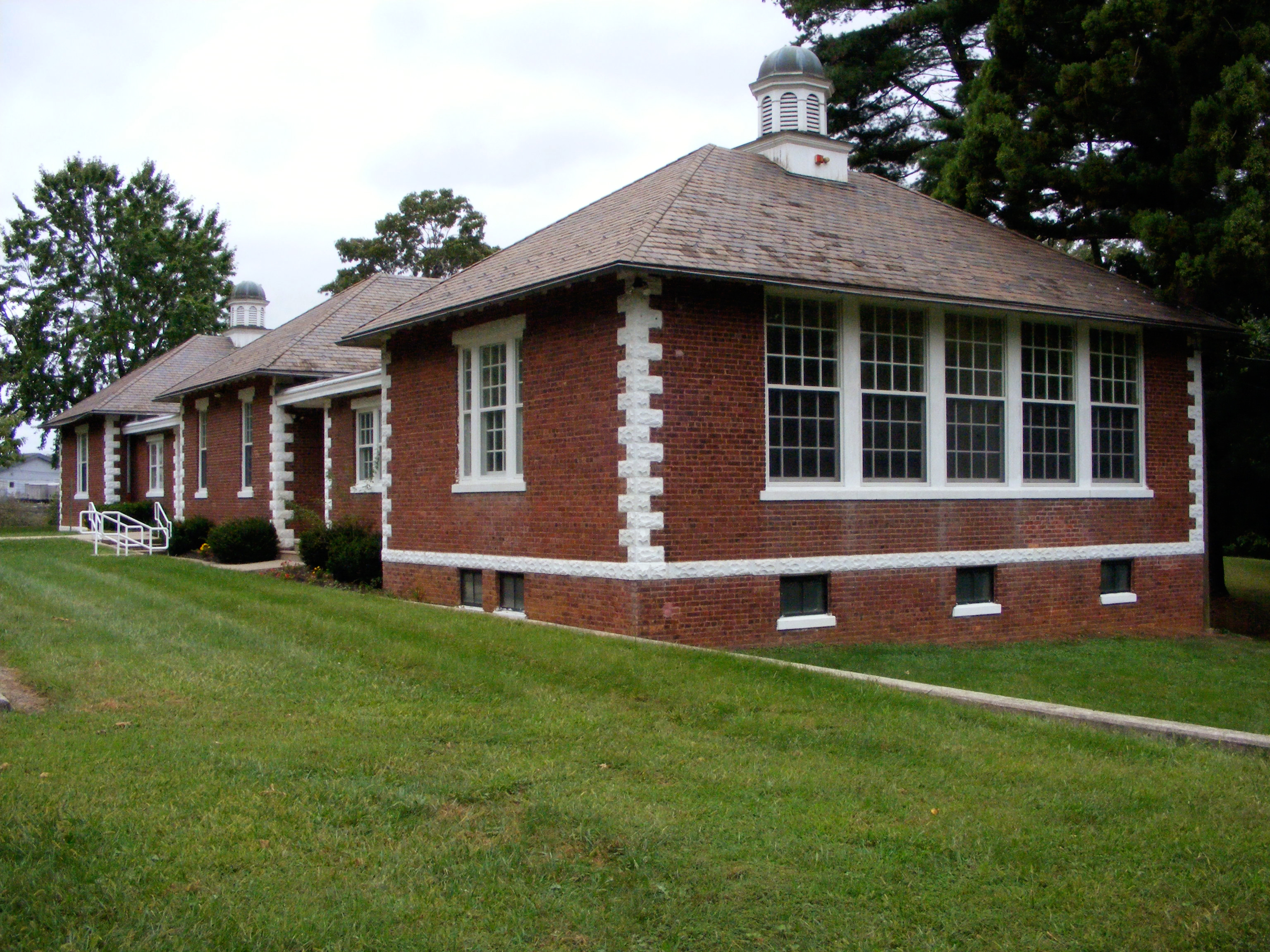

- Location within Monmouth County, New Jersey Location within New Jersey Location within the United States
- Location: Junction of Court Street and Holmes Terrace, Freehold, New Jersey
- Coordinates: 40°15′58″N 74°17′1″W
- Area: 2.3 acres (0.93 ha)
- Built: 1921
- Architect: Cover, Warren H.; Soden Brothers
- Architectural style: Colonial Revival
- NRHP reference No.: 95001003
- NJRHP No.: 1975

Significant dates
- Added to NRHP: August 4, 1995
- Designated NJRHP: June 15, 1995

The Court Street School is located in Freehold Borough, Monmouth County, New Jersey, United States. The original school was organized in 1915 as an African American-only school by the Freehold Board of Education as a one-room wooden building. The existing school building was built in two phases, in 1920 and 1926. All African Americans in Freehold were educated at this school from kindergarten through eighth grade. During World War 2, the school was used as an air raid shelter and a ration station.

Due to pressure from wartime veterans, a court ordered that the school be racially integrated, where it reopened to serve kindergarten through third grade in 1949. The school eventually closed in 1974. In 1990, the school became an education community center and historic landmark for African American history. The building was added to the National Register of Historic Places on August 4, 1995.

== See also ==
- National Register of Historic Places listings in Monmouth County, New Jersey
