= National Register of Historic Places listings in Monmouth County, New Jersey =

Location of Monmouth County in New Jersey

List of the National Register of Historic Places listings in Monmouth County, New Jersey

Contents: Counties and communities in New Jersey
Atlantic – Bergen (Closter, Franklin Lakes, Ridgewood, Saddle River, Wyckoff) – Burlington – Camden – Cape May – Cumberland – Essex – Gloucester – Hudson – Hunterdon – Mercer – Middlesex – Monmouth – Morris – Ocean – Passaic – Salem – Somerset – Sussex – Union – Warren

This is intended to be a complete list of properties and districts listed on the National Register of Historic Places in Monmouth County, New Jersey. Latitude and longitude coordinates of the sites listed on this page may be displayed in an online map.

This National Park Service list is complete through NPS recent listings posted October 23, 2026.

	Name on the Register	Image	Date listed	Location	City or town	Description
1	PS Alexander Hamilton (steamship)	PS Alexander Hamilton (steamship)	March 25, 1977 (#77000887)	Off NJ 36; 40°25′19″N 74°02′06″W	Atlantic Highlands	1924 steamer that sunk in 1977 near Naval Weapons Station Earle
2	All Saints' Memorial Church Complex	All Saints' Memorial Church Complex	February 15, 1974 (#74001179)	Navesink Ave. and Locust Rd. 40°23′53″N 74°01′13″W	Navesink	1864 Gothic-style Episcopal church
3	Allaire Village	Allaire Village	January 11, 1974 (#74001174)	3 miles (4.8 km) southeast of Farmingdale on NJ 524; 40°09′31″N 74°07′44″W	Farmingdale	18th-19th century living history museum
4	Allen House	Allen House	May 8, 1974 (#74001180)	Broad St. and Sycamore Ave. 40°19′26″N 74°03′44″W	Shrewsbury	1710 tavern operating as a historic house museum, part of the Shrewsbury Historic District
5	Allenhurst Railroad Station	Allenhurst Railroad Station	September 17, 1980 (#80002504)	Main St. 40°14′14″N 74°00′25″W	Allenhurst	1897 historic active railroad station
6	Allenhurst Residential Historic District	Allenhurst Residential Historic District	June 18, 2010 (#10000353)	Roughly bounded by the Atlantic Ocean, Main Street, Cedar Avenue, Hume Street, and Elberon Avenue; 40°14′10″N 74°00′02″W	Allenhurst	Historic district including 412 contributing properties
7	Allentown Historic District	Allentown Historic District	June 14, 1982 (#82003284)	Portions of North and South Main streets, Church, Pearl and Hamilton streets, Lakeview Drive and Yardville Road; 40°10′36″N 74°35′14″W	Allentown	Historic district including 219 contributing buildings, including Allentown Mill
8	Allentown Mill	Allentown Mill	February 14, 1978 (#78001774)	42 S. Main Street; 40°10′34″N 74°35′13″W	Allentown	Historic gristmill
9	Allgor–Barkalow Homestead	Allgor–Barkalow Homestead	June 21, 1984 (#84002748)	New Bedford Road; 40°10′30″N 74°03′52″W	Wall Township	Old Wall Historical Society museum
10	Arburtus Cottage	Arburtus Cottage	August 18, 2015 (#15000003)	508 4th Avenue; 40°13′25″N 74°00′25″W	Asbury Park	Stephen Crane House, Asbury Park Historical Society museum
11	Asbury Park Commercial Historic District	Asbury Park Commercial Historic District	September 30, 2014 (#14000536)	Roughly bounded by 500, 600, 700 blocks, of Bond St., Cookman & Mattison Aves. between Lake & Bangs Aves. 40°12′59″N 74°00′43″W	Asbury Park	Encompasses most of downtown Asbury Park
12	Asbury Park Convention Hall	Asbury Park Convention Hall	March 2, 1979 (#79001512)	Ocean Ave. 40°13′22″N 73°59′56″W	Asbury Park	Actively used 1928 convention center located on the boardwalk
13	Audenried Cottage	Audenried Cottage	March 8, 1991 (#91000117)	21 Tuttle Ave. 40°09′31″N 74°01′21″W	Spring Lake	Part of the Spring Lake as a Coastal Resort Multiple Property Submission (MPS)
14	Bell Laboratories-Holmdel	Bell Laboratories-Holmdel	June 26, 2017 (#16000223)	101 Crawfords Corner Rd. 40°21′54″N 74°10′02″W	Holmdel Township	Former research and development facility now used as a mixed use living and working space known as Bell Works
15	Bradley Beach Free Public Library	Bradley Beach Free Public Library	December 24, 2013 (#13000976)	511 4th Ave. 40°12′01″N 74°00′58″W	Bradley Beach	Actively used
16	Bradley Beach Station	Bradley Beach Station	June 22, 1984 (#84002749)	Between LaReine and Brimley Avenues; 40°12′13″N 74°01′09″W	Bradley Beach	part of the Operating Passenger Railroad Stations TR
17	Brielle Road Bridge over the Glimmer Glass	Brielle Road Bridge over the Glimmer Glass	April 25, 2008 (#08000336)	Brielle Rd. over The Glimmer Glass; 40°06′43″N 74°02′45″W	Brielle and Manasquan	1938 bascule bridge
18	Brookdale Farm Historic District	Brookdale Farm Historic District	November 9, 2020 (#100004105)	805 Newman Springs Road, Lincroft; 40°19′58″N 74°08′32″W	Middletown Township	1786 horse farm part of Thompson Park
19	Maj. John Burrowes Mansion	Maj. John Burrowes Mansion	September 29, 1972 (#72000803)	94 Main St. 40°25′00″N 74°13′46″W	Matawan	1723 mansion site to a 1778 clash between British and Patriots
20	Camp Evans Historic District	Camp Evans Historic District	March 26, 2002 (#02000274)	2201 Marconi Rd. (Wall Township) • Boundary increase and decrease (listed August 21, 2012, refnum 12000076): 2201 Marconi Rd. (Wall Township); 40°11′06″N 74°03′28″W	Wall Township	Former military installation
21	The Carlton Theatre	The Carlton Theatre	December 18, 2009 (#09001100)	99 Monmouth St. 40°20′56″N 74°04′13″W	Red Bank	1926 theater now known as Count Basie Theatre
22	Chauncy Jerome Jr. Shipwreck Site	Chauncy Jerome Jr. Shipwreck Site	March 1, 1996 (#96000205)	Address Restricted	Long Branch City	Mid 19th century packet ship
23	Christ Church	Christ Church	November 12, 1971 (#71000511)	92 Kings Highway; 40°23′38″N 74°07′05″W	Middletown Township	1744 historic church
24	Christ Church (Episcopal), Shrewsbury	Christ Church (Episcopal), Shrewsbury	October 25, 1995 (#95001184)	Jct. of Broad St. and Sycamore Ave. 40°19′25″N 74°03′42″W	Shrewsbury	1769 historic church, part of the Shrewsbury Historic District
25	Church of the Presidents	Church of the Presidents	November 7, 1976 (#76001169)	1260 Ocean Ave. 40°15′48″N 73°59′27″W	Long Branch	Former church that seven presidents attended
26	Clarksburg Methodist Episcopal Church	Clarksburg Methodist Episcopal Church	February 5, 1999 (#99000084)	512 Cty Rd. 524; 40°11′29″N 74°27′05″W	Millstone Township	1845 historic church
27	Clarksburg School	Clarksburg School	November 12, 1999 (#99001316)	524 Stagecoach Rd. (Millstone Township); 40°11′28″N 74°26′33″W	Clarksburg	1925 historic school
28	Dr. Robert W. Cooke Medical Office	Dr. Robert W. Cooke Medical Office	January 18, 2011 (#10001145)	67 McCampbell Road; 40°20′44″N 74°10′20″W	Holmdel	1823 medical office, Holmdel Historical Society museum
29	Court Street School	Court Street School	August 4, 1995 (#95001003)	Jct. of Court St. and Holmes Terr. 40°15′58″N 74°17′01″W	Freehold	1921 historic school
30	Coward-Smith House	Coward-Smith House	July 6, 1989 (#89000804)	Burlington Path Rd. 40°08′32″N 74°28′28″W	Upper Freehold	Circa 1750 historic house
31	Coward-Hendrickson House	Coward-Hendrickson House	March 21, 1985 (#85000594)	Address Restricted	Cream Ridge	1728 historic house
32	Dempsey Pump House	Dempsey Pump House	April 11, 2024 (#100010171)	55 Hamilton Avenue, Leonardo; 40°25′06″N 74°03′33″W	Middletown Township	
33	First Presbyterian Church of Rumson	First Presbyterian Church of Rumson	March 3, 2010 (#09000132)	4 E. River Rd. 40°22′34″N 74°00′35″W	Rumson	1885 historic church
34	Frederic A. Duggan First Aid and Emergency Squad Building	Frederic A. Duggan First Aid and Emergency Squad Building	September 18, 1998 (#98001177)	311 Washington Ave. 40°09′19″N 74°01′45″W	Spring Lake	Oldest first aid squad in the country, built in 1934
35	Fisk Chapel	Fisk Chapel	October 29, 1975 (#75001146)	Cedar Ave. 40°21′38″N 74°02′28″W	Fair Haven	1882 African-American historic church
36	Fort Hancock and the Sandy Hook Proving Ground Historic District	Fort Hancock and the Sandy Hook Proving Ground Historic District	April 24, 1980 (#80002505)	NJ 36; 40°26′55″N 73°59′40″W	Sandy Hook	Part of the Gateway National Recreation Area, one of 5 sites operated by the National Park Service in New Jersey
37	Fort Hancock U.S. Life Saving Station	Fort Hancock U.S. Life Saving Station	November 30, 1981 (#81000080)	North of Highlands on Sandy Hook; 40°25′36″N 73°59′04″W	Middletown Township	1894 structure part of the Fort Hancock and the Sandy Hook Proving Ground Historic District
38	Fort Monmouth Historic District	Fort Monmouth Historic District	March 12, 2014 (#13000764)	Oceanport Ave. 40°18′50″N 74°02′42″W	Oceanport	Former army fort installation being readapted as a mixed used development
39	T. Thomas Fortune House	T. Thomas Fortune House	December 8, 1976 (#76001171)	94 W. Bergen Pl. 40°20′29″N 74°04′26″W	Red Bank	19th century historic house
40	Gregory Primary School	Gregory Primary School	October 24, 2012 (#12000880)	157 N. 7th Ave. 40°18′30″N 73°59′47″W	Long Branch	Historic school now used as senior housing
41	Grover House	Grover House	October 10, 2002 (#02001121)	940 W. Front Street; 40°20′41″N 74°06′15″W	Middletown Township	1730 historic house
42	Murry Guggenheim House	Murry Guggenheim House	March 28, 1978 (#78001778)	Cedar and Norwood Avenues; 40°16′56″N 74°00′12″W	West Long Branch	Also known as the Guggenheim Library, at Monmouth University
43	Hankinson–Moreau–Covenhoven House	Hankinson–Moreau–Covenhoven House	May 1, 1974 (#74001175)	150 W. Main Street; 40°15′07″N 74°17′19″W	Freehold	1752 historic house known for being used by Henry Clinton during the American Revolution
44	Holmdel Dutch Reformed Church	Holmdel Dutch Reformed Church	October 22, 1980 (#80002506)	41 Main St. 40°20′43″N 74°11′04″W	Holmdel	1838 historic church
45	Holmes–Hendrickson House	Holmes–Hendrickson House	April 26, 1978 (#78001776)	Longstreet Road, adjacent to Holmdel Park; 40°22′20″N 74°11′09″W	Holmdel	1754 farmhouse
46	Holy Trinity Episcopal Church	Holy Trinity Episcopal Church	March 8, 1991 (#91000116)	Jct. of Monmouth and Third Aves. 40°08′46″N 74°01′52″W	Spring Lake	Part of the Spring Lake as a Coastal Resort MPS
47	Horn Antenna	Horn Antenna	December 20, 1989 (#89002457)	Off Garden State Parkway in Crawford Hill Facility; 40°23′29″N 74°11′07″W	Holmdel	1960s horn antenna known for discovering cosmic microwave background radiation
48	House at 364 Cedar Avenue	House at 364 Cedar Avenue	November 1, 1979 (#79001514)	364 Cedar Avenue; 40°16′53″N 74°00′04″W	Long Branch	Demolished c. 2009
49	Imlaystown Historic District	Imlaystown Historic District	January 3, 1985 (#85000032)	Roughly Imlaystown-Davis Station Rd., and Imlaystown-Red Valley Rd. 40°09′50″N 74°30′41″W	Imlaystown	Historic district with 29 contributing properties, including Salter's Mill
50	Jersey Homesteads Historic District	Jersey Homesteads Historic District	December 5, 1983 (#83004053)	All that area within the corporate boundaries of the Borough of Roosevelt; 40°13′17″N 74°28′26″W	Roosevelt	New Deal era planned community
51	Kovenhoven	Kovenhoven	April 26, 1974 (#74001176)	North of Holmdel off NJ 34; 40°21′56″N 74°11′43″W	Holmdel	1699 historic house
52	Laird & Company Distillery Historic District	Laird & Company Distillery Historic District	October 31, 2024 (#100010927)	1 Laird Road, Scobeyville; 40°17′55″N 74°08′33″W	Colts Neck Township	
53	Lauriston	Lauriston	March 8, 2002 (#02000134)	91 Rumson Road; 40°21′40″N 73°59′43″W	Rumson	Historic mansion demolished in 2023
54	Little Silver Station	Little Silver Station	June 22, 1984 (#84002754)	Sycamore and Branch Aves. 40°19′35″N 74°02′28″W	Little Silver	part of the Operating Passenger Railroad Stations TR
55	Longstreet Farm	Longstreet Farm	November 29, 1979 (#79003255)	Longstreet Road at Roberts Road, Holmdel Park; 40°22′08″N 74°11′02″W	Holmdel	18th century historic living history farm
56	MacGregor-Tallman House	MacGregor-Tallman House	September 5, 1985 (#85002003)	407 Monmouth Rd. 40°16′52″N 74°01′09″W	West Long Branch	18th century historic house
57	MacLeod–Rice House	MacLeod–Rice House	December 3, 2018 (#100003203)	900 Leonardville Road, Leonardo; 40°24′39″N 74°03′18″W	Middletown Township	
58	Martin Maloney Cottage	Martin Maloney Cottage	October 26, 1992 (#91000115)	101 Morris Avenue; 40°09′05″N 74°01′29″W	Spring Lake	Part of the Spring Lake as a Coastal Resort MPS
59	Manasquan Friends Meetinghouse and Burying Ground	Manasquan Friends Meetinghouse and Burying Ground	July 22, 1992 (#91000902)	NJ 35 at Manasquan Circle; 40°07′58″N 74°03′53″W	Wall Township	1884 meeting house
60	Matawan Station	Matawan Station	June 22, 1984 (#84002756)	Between Main and Atlantic Avenues; 40°25′12″N 74°13′27″W	Matawan	part of the Operating Passenger Railroad Stations TR
61	Merino Hill House and Farm	Merino Hill House and Farm	February 11, 1988 (#87002561)	Allentown-Clarksburg Rd., CR 524; 40°11′08″N 74°30′06″W	Wrightsville	Actively used 1735 farm
62	Middletown Village Historic District	Middletown Village Historic District	May 3, 1974 (#74001177)	Irregular pattern on both sides of Kings Highway, south and west of NJ 35; 40°23′38″N 74°06′48″W	Middletown Township	Historic district containing 15 contributing properties, including Christ Church
63	Monmouth Battlefield	Monmouth Battlefield	October 15, 1966 (#66000467)	Northwest of Freehold on NJ 522, west of Rte. 9; 40°16′23″N 74°18′50″W	Freehold Township and Manalapan Township	Site of the Battle of Monmouth on June 28, 1778, during the American Revolutionary War; includes Monmouth Battlefield State Park and Old Tennent Church
64	Monmouth Boat Club	Monmouth Boat Club	August 16, 1994 (#94000857)	Union St. east of Boat Club Ct. 40°21′12″N 74°04′01″W	Red Bank	Actively used 1879 historic boat club building
65	Navesink Historic District	Navesink Historic District	September 5, 1975 (#75001148)	Roughly triangular area including both sides of Monmouth and Locust Avenues to the junction with Hillside and Grand Avenues; 40°24′00″N 74°02′08″W	Navesink	Historic district containing 96 contributing properties
66	Navesink Light Station	Navesink Light Station	February 17, 2006 (#06000237)	100 Government-Lighthouse Road; 40°23′46″N 73°59′09″W	Highlands	1862 non-operational dual lighthouse, also known as Navesink Twin Lights
67	Navesink Military Reservation Historic District	Navesink Military Reservation Historic District	October 13, 2015 (#15000011)	Grand Tour Road and Portland Road, Hartshorne Woods Park; 40°23′26″N 73°59′20″W	Middletown Township	Former military installation located within Hartshorne Woods Park
68	North Long Branch School-Primary No. 3	North Long Branch School-Primary No. 3	July 28, 1999 (#99000906)	469 Church St. 40°19′15″N 73°58′44″W	Long Branch	1891 historic school
69	North Shrewsbury Ice Boat and Yacht Club	North Shrewsbury Ice Boat and Yacht Club	October 31, 2019 (#08000179)	9 Union St. 40°21′10″N 74°04′00″W	Red Bank	Longest standing active iceboat club in the world, established in 1880
70	Ocean Grove Camp Meeting Association District	Ocean Grove Camp Meeting Association District	April 12, 1976 (#76001170)	Bounded by Fletcher Lake, NJ 71, Lake Wesley, and the Atlantic Ocean; 40°12′34″N 74°00′47″W	Ocean Grove	Consists of the entire unincorporated community of Ocean Grove, a late 19th century Christian resort town
71	Old Kentuck	Old Kentuck	November 6, 1973 (#73001118)	Pleasant Valley Road, Pleasant Valley; 40°21′58″N 74°13′12″W	Marlboro	1770 historic house, Asher Holmes House
72	Old Mill at Tinton Falls	Old Mill at Tinton Falls	April 24, 1973 (#73001119)	1205 Sycamore Ave. 40°18′16″N 74°06′03″W	Tinton Falls	1676 historic mill now operating as an MJ's restaurant, part of the Tinton Falls Historic District
73	Old Scots Burying Ground	Old Scots Burying Ground	August 15, 2001 (#01000841)	Gordon's Corner Road; 40°20′23″N 74°15′35″W	Marlboro	1685 historic cemetery
74	Palace Amusements	Palace Amusements	November 22, 2000 (#00001406)	201-207 Lake Ave. 40°13′04″N 74°00′13″W	Asbury Park	Demolished in 2004
75	Parker Homestead	Parker Homestead	December 28, 2011 (#11000966)	235 Rumson Rd. 40°20′36″N 74°02′26″W	Little Silver	1720 historic farmstead
76	Players Boat Club	Players Boat Club	June 17, 2019 (#100004058)	925 River Rd. 40°22′07″N 74°01′48″W	Fair Haven	Active boat club dating back to 1910
77	Probasco-Dittner Farmstead	Probasco-Dittner Farmstead	February 1, 2006 (#05001564)	61 Bucks Mill Rd. 40°17′15″N 74°12′14″W	Colts Neck	Mid-late 18th century farmstead
78	Portland Place	Portland Place	December 12, 2012 (#12001033)	220 Hartshorne Rd. 40°23′25″N 74°00′21″W	Middletown Township	1720 country house on a former farmstead
79	Anthony Reckless Estate	Anthony Reckless Estate	June 3, 1982 (#82003286)	164 Broad Street; 40°20′48″N 74°03′55″W	Red Bank	1870 historic house, now operating as the Woman's Club of Red Bank
80	Red Bank Passenger Station	Red Bank Passenger Station	May 28, 1976 (#76001172)	Ridge and Monmouth Sts. 40°20′52″N 74°04′30″W	Red Bank	part of the Operating Passenger Railroad Stations TR
81	River Street School	River Street School	April 14, 1995 (#95000410)	60 River St. 40°20′35″N 74°04′36″W	Red Bank	Historic school now home to low-income apartments
82	Romer Shoal Light Station	Romer Shoal Light Station	January 24, 2007 (#06001304)	In Lower New York Bay, 3.8 miles (6.1 km) north of Sandy Hook; 40°30′46″N 74°00′50″W	Highlands Borough	part of the Light Stations of the United States MPS
83	Salter's Mill	Salter's Mill	September 29, 1980 (#80002507)	Imlaystown-Davis Station Road; 40°09′54″N 74°30′51″W	Imlaystown	1897 historic gristmill, part of the Imlaystown Historic District
84	Sandy Hook Archeological Site	Sandy Hook Archeological Site	June 26, 1998 (#98000704)	Address Restricted	Highlands	Part of Sandy Hook
85	Sandy Hook Light	Sandy Hook Light	October 15, 1966 (#66000468)	Fort Hancock Military Reservation; 40°27′42″N 74°00′09″W	Sandy Hook	Oldest working lighthouse in the United States, built in 1764, part of the Gateway National Recreation Area
86	Seabright Lawn Tennis and Cricket Club	Seabright Lawn Tennis and Cricket Club	July 9, 1991 (#91000883)	Jct. of Rumson Rd. and Tennis Court Ln. 40°21′59″N 73°59′01″W	Rumson	1877 active historic private sports club, oldest active lawn tennis club in the United States
87	Seabrook–Wilson House	Seabrook–Wilson House	October 29, 1974 (#74001178)	119 Port Monmouth Road, Port Monmouth; 40°26′21″N 74°05′35″W	Middletown Township	
88	Shadow Lawn	Shadow Lawn	March 28, 1978 (#78001780)	Cedar and Norwood Aves. 40°16′46″N 74°00′19″W	West Long Branch	Also known as Woodrow Wilson Hall, at Monmouth University
89	Shrewsbury Historic District	Shrewsbury Historic District	July 17, 1978 (#78001779)	Broad and Sycamore Streets; 40°19′23″N 74°03′49″W	Shrewsbury	Historic district encompassing 47 contributing buildings, including the Christ Church, the Allen House, and the Wardell House
90	Shrewsbury Township Hall	Shrewsbury Township Hall	December 8, 1980 (#80002508)	51 Monmouth St. 40°20′57″N 74°04′06″W	Red Bank	1892 former town hall, now used as a performing arts center for Red Bank Catholic High School
91	Squan Beach Life-Saving Station #9	Squan Beach Life-Saving Station #9	March 5, 2008 (#08000135)	Ocean & 2nd Aves. 40°07′03″N 74°02′02″W	Manasquan	1902 lifeguard station
92	St. George's-by-the-River Episcopal Church	St. George's-by-the-River Episcopal Church	February 13, 2007 (#07000045)	7 Lincoln Ave. 40°21′48″N 73°58′43″W	Rumson	1907 historic church
93	St. James Memorial Church of Eatontown	St. James Memorial Church of Eatontown	February 17, 1978 (#78001775)	69 Broad St. 40°18′22″N 74°03′26″W	Eatontown	1866 historic church
94	St. John's Episcopal Church	St. John's Episcopal Church	December 27, 1990 (#90001374)	Little Silver Point Rd. 40°20′02″N 74°01′58″W	Little Silver	1876 historic church
95	St. Peter's Episcopal Church	St. Peter's Episcopal Church	March 19, 1998 (#98000256)	31 Throckmorton St. 40°15′34″N 74°16′34″W	Freehold Borough	1771 historic church
96	Steinbach–Cookman Building	Steinbach–Cookman Building	July 8, 1982 (#82003285)	Cookman Avenue; 40°12′59″N 74°00′37″W	Asbury Park	Early 20th century former flagship store of the Steinbach department store chain, part of the Asbury Park Commercial Historic District
97	George Taylor House	George Taylor House	April 29, 1994 (#94000392)	74 Broadway; 40°16′03″N 74°16′02″W	Freehold Borough	1870 historic house
98	Tinton Falls Historic District	Tinton Falls Historic District	November 10, 1977 (#77000888)	Irregular pattern along Tinton and Sycamore Avenues; 40°18′18″N 74°05′57″W	Tinton Falls	Historic district containing the Old Mill at Tinton Falls
99	The Towers	The Towers	August 20, 2012 (#12000529)	27 Prospect Circle; 40°24′44″N 74°02′01″W	Atlantic Highlands	1894 house known as the Strauss Mansion
100	Trinity Church	Trinity Church	August 6, 2014 (#14000465)	503 Asbury Ave. 40°13′11″N 74°00′29″W	Asbury Park	1908 historic stone church
101	Turf Club	Turf Club	April 28, 2025 (#100011730)	1200 Springwood Avenue; 40°12′54″N 74°01′16″W	Asbury Park	
102	Union Schoolhouse	Union Schoolhouse	June 23, 1976 (#76001173)	West of Red Bank on Middletown-Lincroft Road; 40°21′57″N 74°07′14″W	Middletown Township	1842 historic schoolhouse, also known as the Little Red Schoolhouse
103	Upper Freehold Baptist Meeting	Upper Freehold Baptist Meeting	April 21, 1975 (#75001147)	East of Imlaystown on Yellow Meetinghouse and Red Valley roads 40°10′08″N 74°28′28″W	Upper Freehold Township	1720 historic church also known as Ye Olde Yellow Meeting House
104	Upper Meeting House of the Baptist Church of Middletown	Upper Meeting House of the Baptist Church of Middletown	December 7, 1990 (#87002573)	40 Main St. 40°20′41″N 74°11′11″W	Holmdel	1809 historic church
105	Village Inn	Village Inn	November 13, 1972 (#72000802)	Water and Main Streets; 40°17′50″N 74°21′34″W	Englishtown	1732 historic house also known as Davis Tavern and Robert Newell House
106	Walker-Combs-Hartshorne Farmstead	Walker-Combs-Hartshorne Farmstead	October 4, 1990 (#90001474)	189 Wemrock Rd. 40°14′51″N 74°18′22″W	Freehold	1686 historic farmstead
107	Walnford	Walnford	June 29, 1976 (#76001167)	South of Allentown off CR 539; 40°08′05″N 74°33′32″W	Walnford	Historic district containing 16 contributing buildings
108	Wardell House	Wardell House	July 24, 1974 (#74001181)	419 Sycamore Ave. 40°19′22″N 74°03′46″W	Shrewsbury	1764 historic house, part of the Shewsbury Historic District
109	Water Witch Club Casino	Water Witch Club Casino	August 13, 1990 (#90001219)	Junction of E. Twin Road and W. Twin Road; 40°24′01″N 73°59′36″W	Middletown Township	1905 historic clubhouse, used as a venue today, focal point of the Water Witch Club Historic District
110	Water Witch Club Historic District	Water Witch Club Historic District	March 12, 2004 (#04000147)	Roughly bounded by NJ 36, Water Witch Dr., Sea View Terrace, Park Way, Windlass Path and Serpentine Dr. 40°24′02″N 73°59′49″W	Middletown Township	Historic district containing numerous contributing buildings, including the Water Witch Club Casino
111	Robert White House	Robert White House	March 7, 2012 (#12000077)	20 South St. 40°20′45″N 74°03′43″W	Red Bank	1790s historic home, oldest in Red Bank
112	Winsor Building	Winsor Building	September 13, 1979 (#79001513)	400-420 Main St. and 715-131 Bangs Ave; 40°13′02″N 74°00′42″W	Asbury Park	1904 historic mixed-used building
113	George Wurts Summer Home	George Wurts Summer Home	December 28, 1989 (#89002162)	306 Eighth Ave. 40°13′41″N 74°00′07″W	Asbury Park	19th century summer home for

== Former listings ==
	Name on the Register	Image	Date listed	Date removed	Location	City or town	Description
1	Anderson House		May 17, 1972 (#72001498)	December 23, 1976	East of Manalapan on NJ 33	Manalapan Township	Destroyed by fire in 1975.
2	Elberon Railroad Station		June 9, 1978 (#78001777)	October 30, 1990	Lincoln Ave.	Long Branch City	Destroyed by fire on May 27, 1988.
3	Mayfair Theatre		December 2, 1974 (#74002229)	January 24, 1975	Lake Ave. and St. James Pl.	Asbury Park	Demolished on December 6, 1974.
4	North American Phalanx	North American Phalanx	September 14, 1972 (#72001499)	May 8, 1974	Phalanx Rd.	Colts Neck Township	Destroyed by fire November 15, 1972.
