= Manasquan =

Manasquan may refer to:

- Manasquan, New Jersey, a borough in Monmouth County, New Jersey, United States
- Manasquan River, a waterway in central New Jersey draining to the Atlantic Ocean
- Manasquan Reservoir
- Manasquan (NJT station)
- Manasquan Public Schools
  - Manasquan High School
- Manasquan Inlet
- USS Manasquan (AG-36)
- Manasquan Friends Meetinghouse and Burying Ground
