= Probasco-Dittmar Farmstead =

Historic house in New Jersey, United States

- U.S. National Register of Historic Places
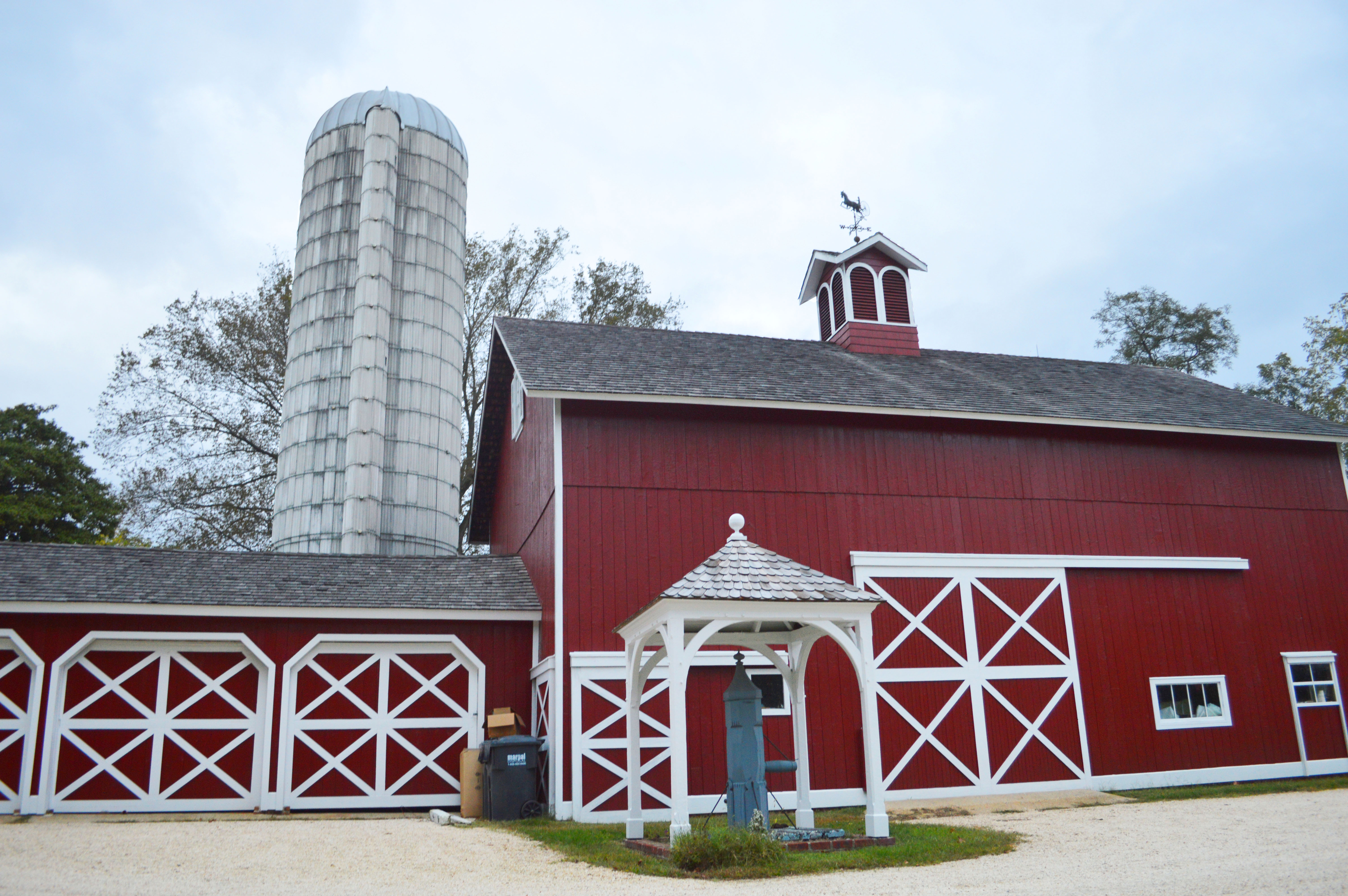

- Location within Monmouth County, New Jersey Location within New Jersey Location within the United States
- Location: 61 Bucks Mill Road; Colts Neck Township, New Jersey
- Area: 101.7 acres (41.2 ha)
- Built: 1735
- Architectural style: Colonial
- NRHP reference No.: 05001564
- Added to NRHP: February 1, 2006

The Probasco-Dittmar Farmstead, also known as Duck Hollow Farm since the 1950s, is a historic farmstead in Colts Neck Township, in Monmouth County, in the U.S. state of New Jersey. The farmstead consists of the main dwelling house and 16 outbuildings, 4 of which are historic while the remainder were added between the 1950s through the 1990s, and are not considered to be contributing properties. The farm complex showcases Dutch influence and slavery in colonial New Jersey farm life. The house is one of only a few remaining eighteenth century houses in Monmouth County that have a two-story, heavy timber Dutch frame. It has been listed on the National Register of Historic Places since February 1, 2006.

== Description ==
The main dwelling house is an Anglo-Dutch three-part wooden framed building constructed in the mid-to-late 18th century. The two-story main block of the house, located on the west side of the house, dates to the mid-18th century, while the one and one half-story middle section dates to the late eighteenth century. The oldest part of the house contains, built around 1760, also maintains its pegged and numbered rafters, rafter scabs for kick eaves, beaded clapboard on the north elevation, and original windows hi the north elevation The house contains a full basement. The interior of the house originally consisted of four rooms: two rooms on the west side, a stair hall on the east side and a room behind the stair hall. Various alterations have occurred in each section of the house throughout the 19th and 20th centuries, with major renovations occurring after the Dittmar family purchased the farm in 1949.

The main house is unique in the fact that 18th-century Dutch houses in the Mid-Atlantic are overwhelmingly one and one-half stories in height, while English builders typically constructed two-story buildings (as seen throughout much of New England). This makes the Probasco-Dittmar house unique in that it had two-stories, but was built by Dutch builders.

Other historic buildings that exist upon the purchase of the farmstead by the Dittmar family included an English barn, corncrib, chicken/duck coop, and a three-bay garage. The English barn, built in 1880, was likely used for crops instead of livestock. This barn was probably built when the farm passed out of the Probasco family holdings and was bought in a sheriffs sale by Englishman George Wilkins in 1880. The three-bay garage and corncrib date to the late 19th century, while the chicken/duck coop dates to the early 20th century.

All of the non-contributing buildings in the property were built by the Dittmars after they purchased the property in 1949. This includes the silo (1960s), root cellar (1977), summer kitchen (1978), ice house (early 1980s), spring house (late 1970s), stable/caretaker's house (early 1960s), law office (mid 1990s), smokehouse (late 1970s), garden/potting shed (1977), beehive hutch (early 1980s), woodworking shop (early 1980s), and machine shed (early 1980s). Additionally, other non-contributing structures include cucumber pump (1967), two gazebos (1977 & 1986), and the vestiges of the 1854 mill site, which were vandalized in 1967, leaving just the stone foundation.

== History ==
=== Probascos ===
The farmstead dates back to the early 18th century when a Dutch family from Long Island, Christoffel Probasco and Sara Ammerma, moved to Colts Neck in 1735 and began to construct the farmhouse. The two had a son, Abraham, who inherited the house in 1790. Abraham operated the farm, where based on inventory records, he raised various livestock and crops. Abraham owned three slaves at the time of his death in 1806. Abraham was an anti-abolitionist and major advocate for the institution of slavery. The first house expansion was under Abraham, likely around the 1780s. It is likely that the one and one-half story expansion of the house was used as slave quarters. Abraham passed on the farm to his son, Christopher, in 1804 at his death.

Christopher ran the farm successful like his father, acquiring various luxury goods. Christopher operated the gristmill and ran the farm until his death in 1845. In his will, he passed on three farms amongst his nine children. Two of his sons, Jacob Van Nest and Christopher, were given a large gristmill, near the center of the village. His other two sons Joseph Philips and Cornelius, were given the homestead farm with the accompanying grist mill.

Joseph Philips and Cornelius were both listed as owners of the property in the 1850 census, with ten people living on the farm, including two of their unmarried sisters. In 1854, the brothers rebuilt the grist mill to four stories high, making it one of the largest grist mills in the area. Cornelius died in 1852, resulting in their other brothers to sign over their portion of the property to Joseph, granting him full ownership. Joseph took out an insurance policy on the farm in 1858 with Monmouth Mutual Fire Insurance Company. Joseph died in 1865, but his children were all minors.

In 1869, Joseph's brother Christopher, the estate administrator, leased the mill and barn to Alfred C. Hulit in order to keep them mill's ownership in the family. Hulit transferred this interest to K. Reid in 1870. In October 1870 the mill and farm lots were sold separately, with the mill going to William Buck, while the buyers of the farm sold some of the property back to Elizabeth Probasco, Joseph's widow, in 1871. Elizabeth retained the property until a sheriff's sale in 1880, thus ending the 155 year-long ownership in the Probasco family. The property was sold to George Wilkins.

=== Other Owners ===
William Buck, who owned the gristmill portion of the property after the 1870 sale operated a 24 horsepower turbine rather than the mill will, where he produced various types of grain. Buck owned the gristmill until 1915, when his son Garrett sold it to his brother, Alfred, who owned the mill until 1930.

In 1920, George Wilkins sold the farm to Theodore Rowe, which was followed by the farm exchanging hands five times before it was finally sold to Florence and George Dittmar.

=== Dittmars ===
The Dittmar family purchased the property in 1949 and have preserved existing historic elements of the property since. Upon purchase, the farm only contained an English barn, corncrib, chicken/duck coop, and a three-bay garage. They renamed the farm to Duck Hollow Farm, although the farm became known as the Probasco-Dittmar Farm. The Dittmars began major renovation work shortly after moving in to restore the house. The Dittmars understood historic preservation, and worked hard to renovate the property. George Dittmar became a member of the Colts Neck Township Committee in 1956, and two terms as mayor of Colts Neck in 1958 and 1961. George went on to become president of the Monmouth County Historical Association, where he helped restore properties such as Allen House in Shrewsbury, the Covenhoven House in Freehold, and the Holmes-Hendrickson House.

The Dittmar's renovations were inspired by their interest in Colonial Williamsburg and early American architecture, and they did several changes and additions to the interior and exterior of the house. Their greatest change was the creation of a pond on the north side of the house and various outbuildings. Most of these buildings were replicas of buildings the Dittmars had seen in Colonial Williamsburg and rural Pennsylvania.

George and Florence managed to buy up the pieces of land that were sold over time to reconnect the farm. In 1963, they bought the mill lot and mill meadow lot that was owned by the Buck family. In 1967, George renovated the mill, and had a mill wheel built. The mill was destroyed in 1967 by arsonists as part of a Halloween prank. Today, the farm is owned by George and Florence's children, Trudy and George Dittmarr III.
