= Glimmerglass =

Glimmerglass may refer to:

- Otsego Lake (New York), called "Glimmerglass" in the Leatherstocking Tales of James Fenimore Cooper
- Glimmerglass Festival, formerly Glimmerglass Opera
- Glimmerglass State Park, NY, US
- Glimmerglass Lagoon, State University of New York at Oswego, Oswego NY, US
- The Glimmer Glass, a tidal Inlet with a lift bridge, on Manasquan River, NJ
- Glimmerglass Systems, manufacturer of photonic switches used in the Amsterdam Internet Exchange
- Glimmerglass Vodka, a brand of vodka made by the Cooperstown Distillery.
