= Union Schoolhouse =

- U.S. National Register of Historic Places
- New Jersey Register of Historic Places
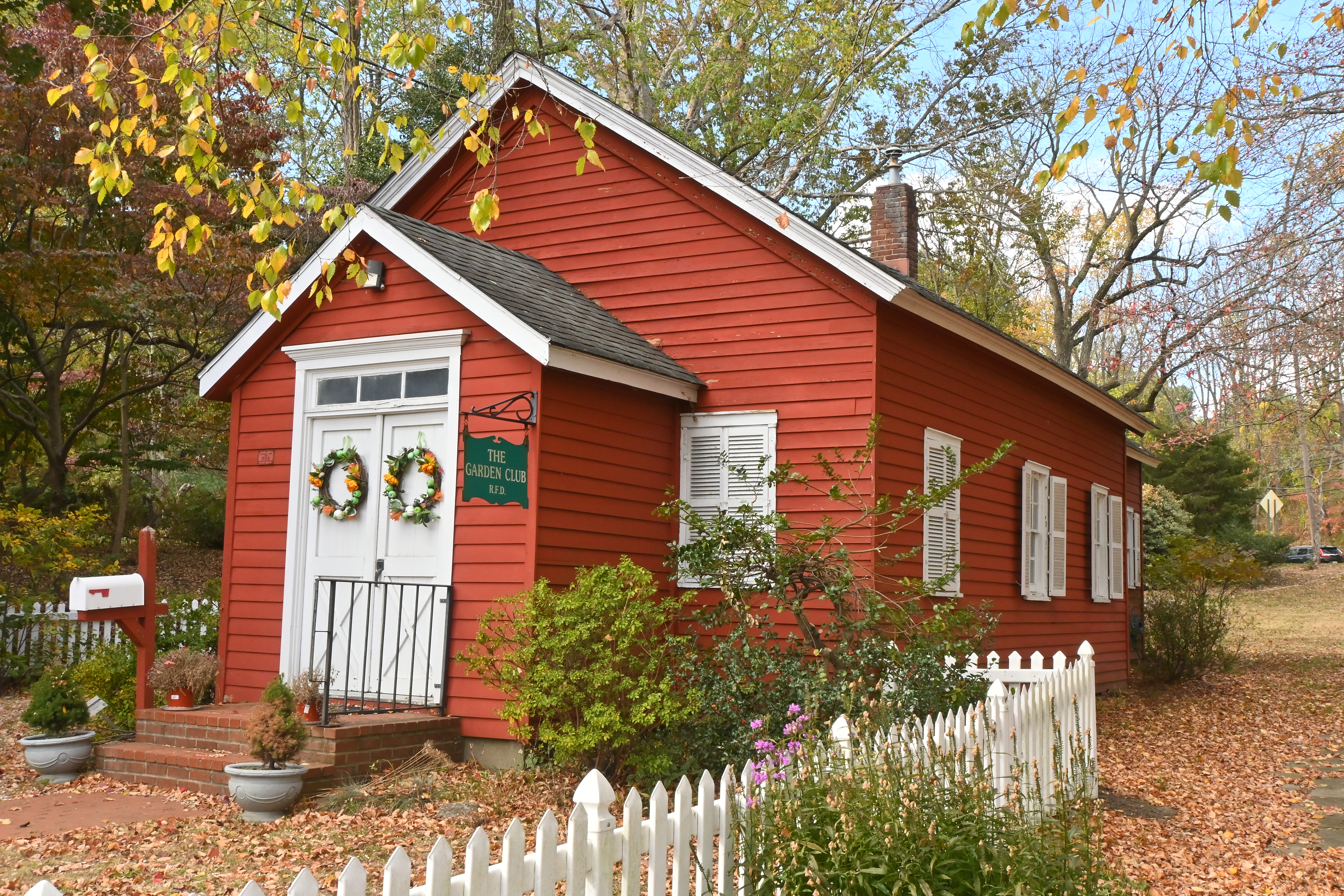
- Little Red Schoolhouse in 2024

- Location within Monmouth County, New Jersey Location within New Jersey Location within the United States
- Location: 951 Middletown-Lincroft Road, Middletown Township, New Jersey
- Coordinates: 40°21′57″N 74°7′14″W
- Built: 1842
- NRHP reference No.: 76001173
- NJRHP No.: 2034

Significant dates
- Added to NRHP: June 23, 1976
- Designated NJRHP: December 4, 1975

The Union Schoolhouse is located at 951 Middletown-Lincroft Road, west of Red Bank, in Middletown Township of Monmouth County, New Jersey, United States. The historic one-room schoolhouse, also known as the Little Red Schoolhouse, was built in 1842. It was added to the National Register of Historic Places on June 23, 1976, for its significance in education.

The schoolhouse was used for education until 1909, when a larger building was needed. It was then sold to Joseph T. Field. In 1955, the township acquired the property and has leased it to the Garden Club RFD.

== See also ==
- National Register of Historic Places listings in Monmouth County, New Jersey
