= Wardell House (Shrewsbury, New Jersey) =

Historic house in New Jersey, United States

- U.S. National Register of Historic Places
- New Jersey Register of Historic Places
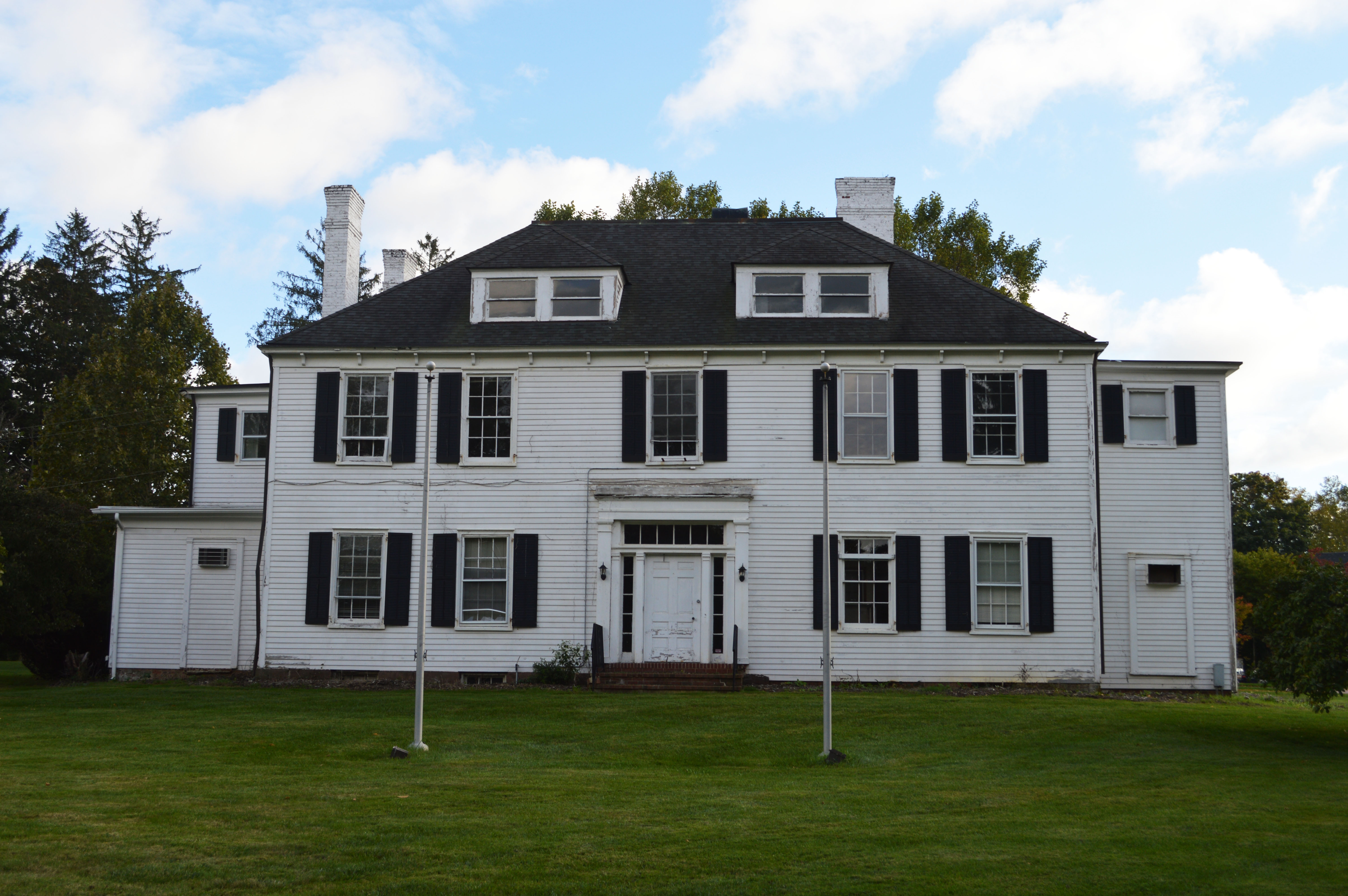

- Location within Monmouth County, New Jersey Location within New Jersey Location within the United States
- Location: 419 Sycamore Avenue, Shrewsbury, NJ 07702
- Coordinates: 40°19′22″N 74°3′46″W
- Area: 21.6 acres (8.7 ha)
- Built: 1764
- Built by: John Wardell
- Architectural style: Greek Revival
- NRHP reference No.: 74001181
- NJRHP No.: 2056

Significant dates
- Added to NRHP: July 24, 1974
- Designated NJRHP: December 20, 1973

The Wardell House is located at 419 Sycamore Avenue in the borough of Shrewsbury in Monmouth County, New Jersey, United States. The house was built in 1764 and was added to the National Register of Historic Places on July 24, 1974, for its significance in agriculture, architecture, and politics.

The two-story frame house was built by John Wardell in 1764. According to the nomination form, it was redecorated using Greek Revival style in the early 19th century, probably by William L. Lippincott, who acquired the house after confiscation.

== See also ==
- National Register of Historic Places listings in Monmouth County, New Jersey
