= Anthony Reckless Estate =

Historic house and women's club

- U.S. National Register of Historic Places
- New Jersey Register of Historic Places
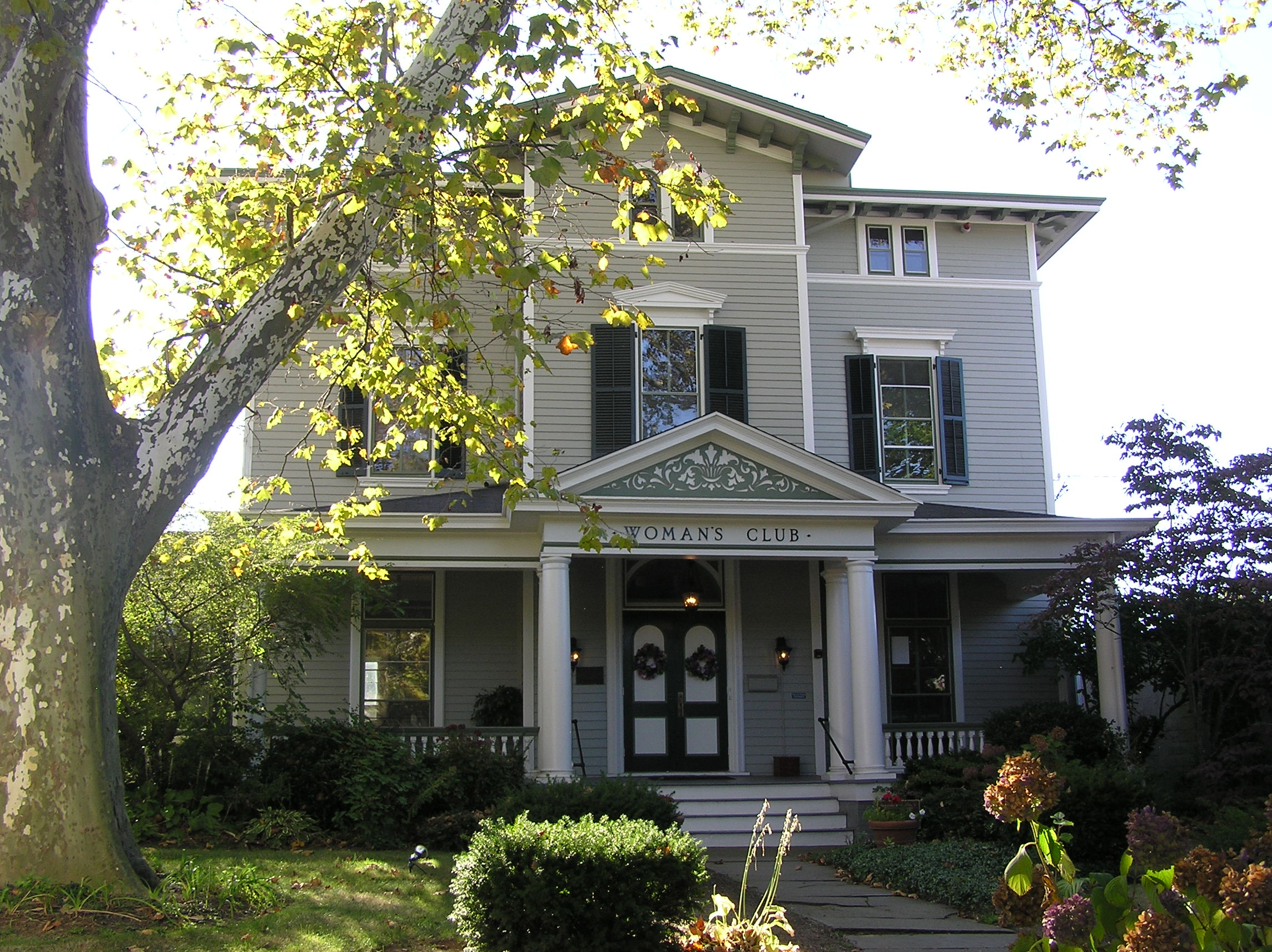
- The Woman's Club in 2013

- Location within New Jersey
- Location: 164 Broad Street, Red Bank, New Jersey 07701
- Coordinates: 40.3465402°N 74.0653189°W
- Built: 1870
- Architectural style: Italianate, Central hall plan
- NRHP reference No.: 82003286
- NJRHP No.: 2046

Significant dates
- Added to NRHP: June 3, 1982
- Designated NJRHP: February 2, 1982

The Anthony Reckless Estate, now the Woman's Club of Red Bank, is a historic house in downtown Red Bank, New Jersey. It was completed in 1870 and it was added to both the National Register of Historic Places and the New Jersey Register of Historic Places in 1982.

== History ==
Anthony Reckless was a prominent Red Bank resident who served in the New Jersey Senate from 1860 to 1865. He founded the New Jersey Standard newspaper and was president and treasurer of the New York and Long Branch Railroad.

In 1870, the house was built on what was then a much larger estate. It was relocated in 1910 to make way for a Presbyterian church. The Woman's Club of Red Bank, founded in 1917, purchased the house and converted it into a clubhouse in 1921.

During the COVID-19 shutdown in 2020, the club used the time to complete repairs. Today, it hosts a variety of programs, including book clubs, panel discussions, tango classes, and a mom's group.

== Architecture ==
The Italianate-style villa features bracketed eaves and three bays, with a central pavilion forming the projecting middle bay. The entire front of the house has a porch and the interior follows a central hall plan.

== See also ==
- List of women's clubs
- National Register of Historic Places listings in Monmouth County, New Jersey
