= North Long Branch School-Primary No. 3 =

- U.S. National Register of Historic Places
- New Jersey Register of Historic Places
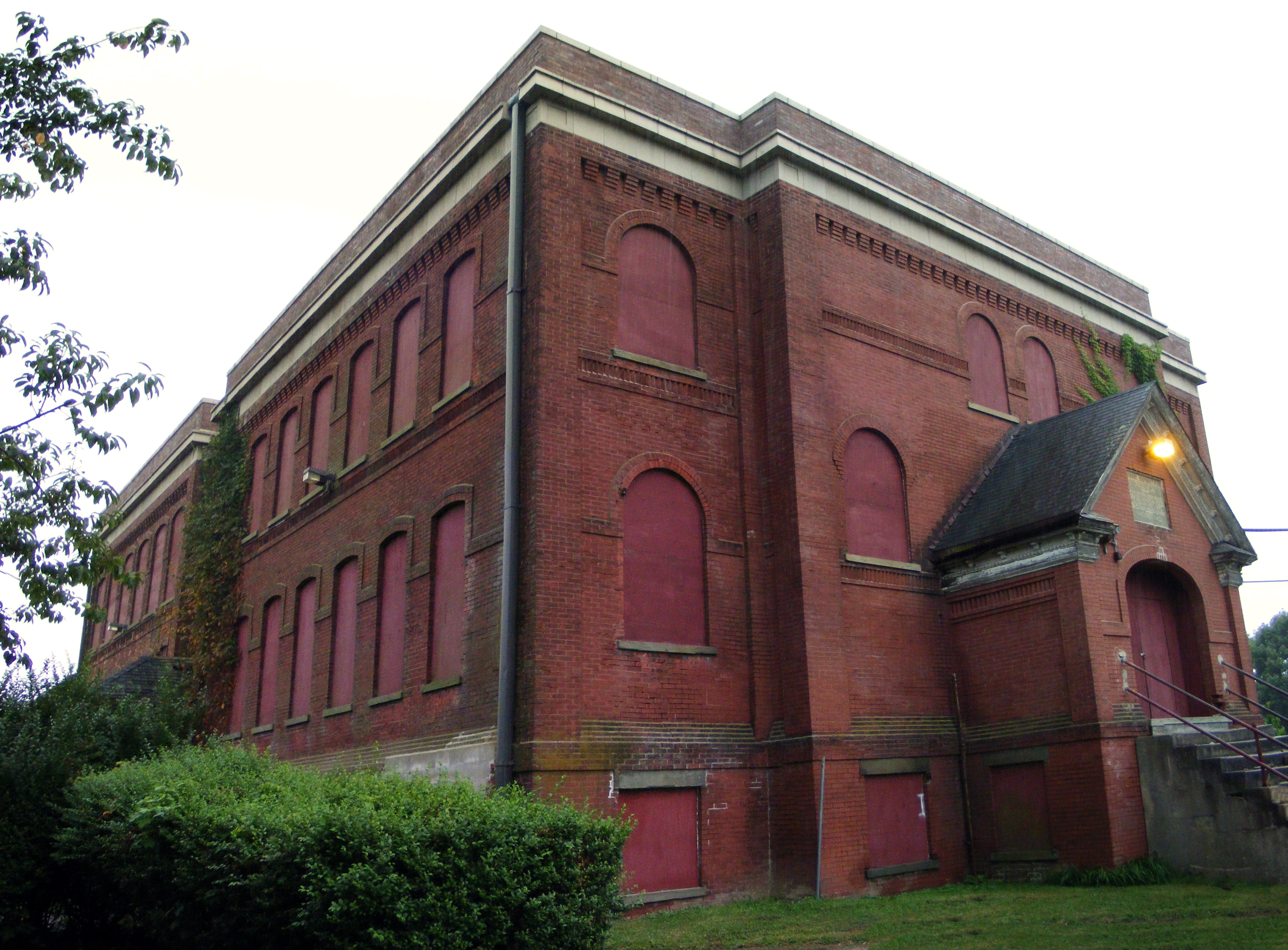

- Location within Monmouth County, New Jersey Location within New Jersey Location within the United States
- Location: 469 Church Street, Long Branch, New Jersey
- Coordinates: 40°19′15″N 73°58′44″W
- Area: 1.5 acres (0.61 ha)
- Built: 1891
- Architect: Hartwell, A.L.; Wilson, C.V.N., et al.
- Architectural style: Romanesque, Colonial Revival
- NRHP reference No.: 99000906
- NJRHP No.: 48

Significant dates
- Added to NRHP: July 28, 1999
- Designated NJRHP: May 27, 1999

The North Long Branch School-Primary No. 3 is located in Long Branch, Monmouth County, New Jersey, United States. The building was built in 1891 and added to the National Register of Historic Places on July 28, 1999.

== See also ==
- National Register of Historic Places listings in Monmouth County, New Jersey
