= Winsor Building =

- U.S. National Register of Historic Places
- New Jersey Register of Historic Places
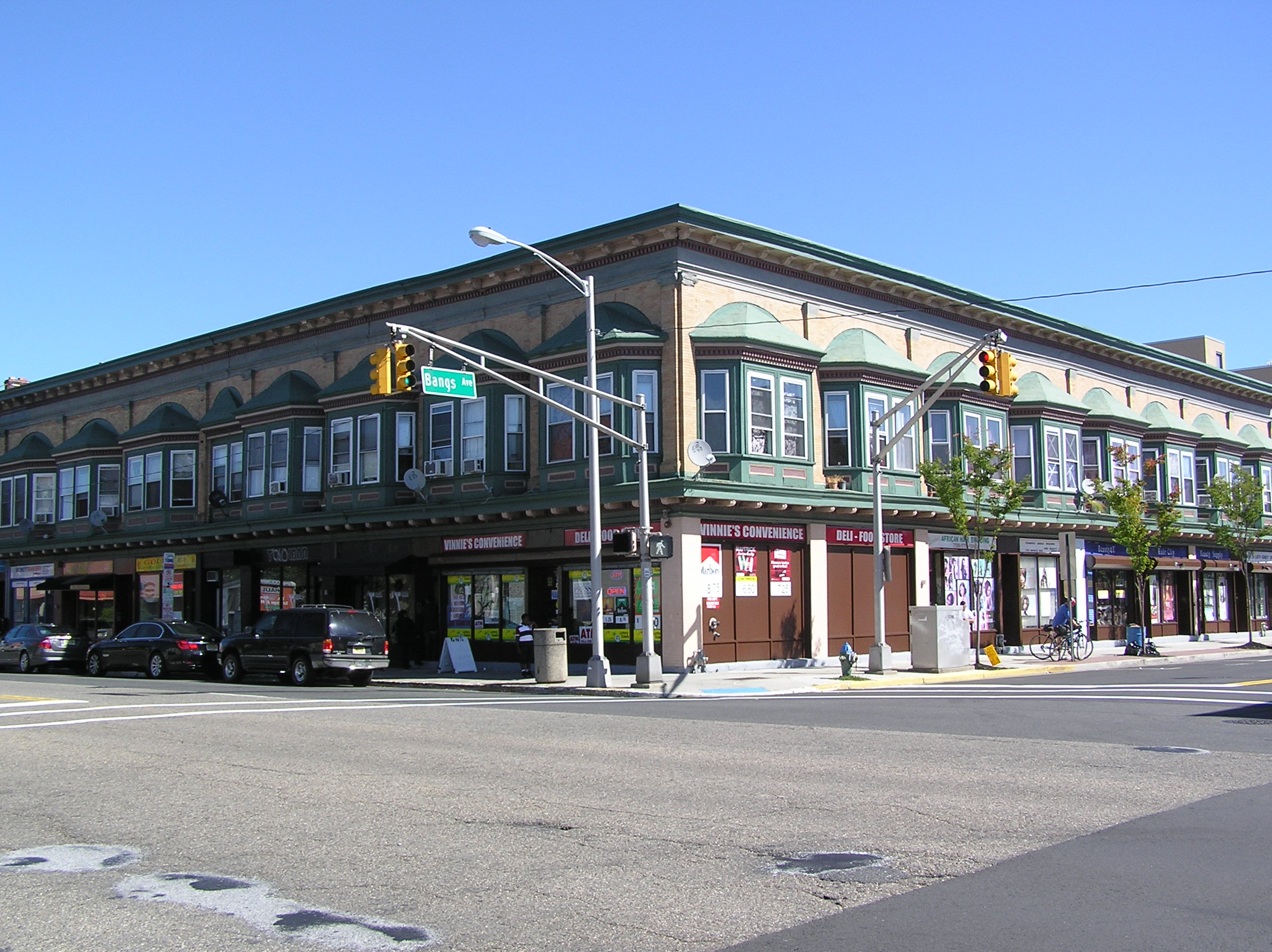

- Location within Monmouth County, New Jersey Location within New Jersey Location within the United States
- Location: 400–420 Main Street, Asbury Park, New Jersey
- Coordinates: 40°13′2″N 74°0′42″W
- Built: 1904
- Architect: William C. Cottrell
- NRHP reference No.: 79001513
- NJRHP No.: 1958

Significant dates
- Added to NRHP: September 13, 1979
- Designated NJRHP: July 5, 1979

The Winsor Building is located at 400–420 Main Street in the city Asbury Park in Monmouth County, New Jersey, United States. Built in 1904, it was added to the National Register of Historic Places on September 13, 1979, for its significance in architecture, community planning and development.

== History ==
The original Winsor Building, built in 1904, had a frontage of 67 feet on Main Street and 123 feet on Bangs Avenue. It is a two-story structure made of orange brick and galvanized iron.

On the first floor, there are nine stores fitted with show windows. Three stores face main street, alongside a tunnel driveway to the rear while the remaining six stores face Bangs Avenue. The second floor comprises 8 apartments, featuring bay windows. An additional 66' of similar store fronts and apartments were added some time after 1911, making the total length of the building along Main Street 133 feet. This addition consisted of four first floor stores and four second floor apartments and, except for one minor element mentioned elsewhere, is most difficult to tell apart from the original 1904 structure.

Bangs Avenue - 1904 section: The bottom floor of the building consists of three double sectioned large high windowed bays with common recessed entrance foyers leading either into a shop or to a stairway to the second story apartments. Each double section is separate from the other by a plain brick column. A cast iron Corinthian column is centrally located in each common entrance. Hardware items such as hinges, mail slots, door bells, speaking tubes and awning brackets are present. A bracketed sheet metal entablature separates the first and second story and is repeated at the cornice with a band of dentils below the .a The nine second story brick columns rising from the entablature are separated equally by eight sheet metal four windowed bays with wooden panels below the windows. A semi-circular brick arch caps each of the eight bays.

Main Street:

A similar façade pattern is repeated along Main Street except that 8 bay windows are present with an additional two windows in a small bay. This two window bay is assumed to be located over the 1904 tunnel entrance to the rear courtyard. The latter addition (north of the tunnel) consists of 4 second story bays. This section has no cast iron columns in the first story recessed store entrances but each entrance floor is decorated with an inlaid pattern weave of white tile with a green border. Similar hardware items, such as those mentioned before, are present. Recessed wooden panels and transoms are located in logical sequence throughout the entire façade. Some of the capitals are missing on the second story Bangs Avenue side and have been covered with flat metal sheeting.

The Winsor Building is an Excellent example of a well designed commercial apartment investment property from the early 1900's, with typical business stores on the first floor and apartments on the second floor. The façade of the building is unusual in that it has survived for 75 years with little if any changes, due possibly to the fact that the building was owned, operated and maintained by family members of the original owner-builder, Henry C. Winsor. Henry C. Winsor was President of the Asbury Park-Ocean Grove Bank and owned or was involved in many development projects in Asbury Park during the period of 1905-1920. The Winsor Building, because of its location and design qualities; continues to exert a positive influence on the downtown Asbury Park business district. The building commands an important corner in Asbury Park across from the 1912 white marble Italian Renaissance U.S. Post Office and the former railroad station area. It is also close to the central business area of Asbury Park where other similar but seriously altered early 1900 buildings are located. These two buildings - the Winsor Building and the U.S. Post Office - form the northern outer perimeter of a now redeveloping business area. The present owner of the Winsor Building is in the process of restoring the exterior to its original condition. While most downtown commercial buildings have been modernized or destroyed for parking lots, the Winsor Building remains as a testament to successful commercial structures from the early 1900's.

== See also ==
- National Register of Historic Places listings in Monmouth County, New Jersey
