= Christ Church (Middletown, New Jersey) =

Historic church in New Jersey, United States

- Christ Episcopal Church
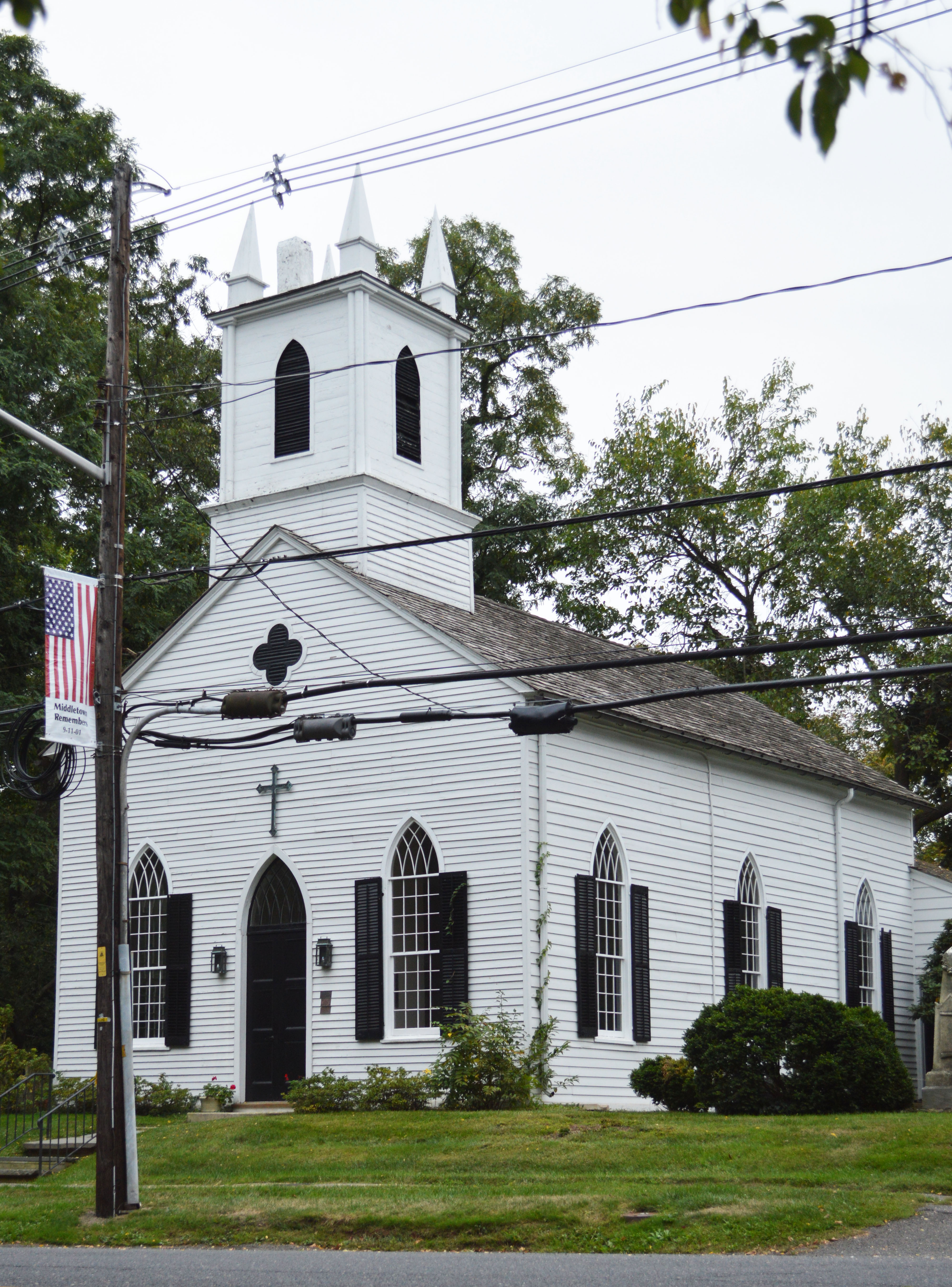

- Location within Monmouth County, New Jersey
- 40°23′38″N 74°07′04″W
- Location: Middletown Township, New Jersey
- Country: United States
- Denomination: Episcopal
- Churchmanship: Anglican Communion
- Website: christchurchmiddletown.org

History
- Status: Church
- Founded: 17 October 1702
- Dedicated: 1738
- Events: Sir Henry Clinton and Lord Cornwallis leaving the Battle of Monmouth meet at the Church corner. Some of the wounded were housed in the Church.

Architecture
- Functional status: Active
- Style: Neo-gothic
- Years built: 1744-1745
- Groundbreaking: 1744
- Completed: 1745

Specifications
- Length: 53 feet (16 m)
- Width: 40.25 feet (12.27 m)
- Height: 16.5 feet (5.0 m)
- Materials: Large, hand-shaped rough stone

Administration
- Province: Province II
- Diocese: Episcopal Diocese of New Jersey

Clergy
- Bishop: Rt. Rev. Sally French
- Christ Episcopal Church
- U.S. National Register of Historic Places
- New Jersey Register of Historic Places
- Location: Middletown Township, New Jersey
- Built: 1744
- Architectural style: Neo-gothic
- NRHP reference No.: 71000511
- NJRHP No.: 2022

Significant dates
- Designated: November 12, 1971
- Designated NJRHP: July 19, 1971

Christ Church is a historic church in Middletown Township, New Jersey built in 1744.

== History ==
=== Early years ===
Though not officially named as such, it is believed that the first Church of England services held in Middletown was in the private home of Alexander Innes, the former chaplain of the Fort of New York, as early as the 1680s. Middletown, at the time, wasn't the best place in the region due to its proximity to the shore and the perpetuation of its residents to house visiting pirates.

In 1701, New Jersey British Governor Lewis Morris wrote to the Bishop of London about the "wicked" Middletown. The letter described the Sunday Meetings (presumably church services) at the local publick house being filled with fights and running of races. By 1702 the Society for the Propagation of the Gospel in Foreign Parts arrived by way of their missionary George Keith. Along with Innes, the men formed what was to become Christ Church on October 17, 1702. For several years, services were held in private homes until 1705, when Judge John Johnson - a friend of Innes - gave over the rights to the old Monmouth Patent courts for use of a church.

In 1738, King George II granted the church an official charter that was signed by Governor William Burnet. By 1744, a building was constructed and finished the next year allowing services to being.

=== American Revolution ===
The church survived the battles unscathed despite its proximity to several battles and skirmishes. Following the Battle of Monmouth, the battle-beaten Sir Henry Clinton and Lord Cornwallis met at the corner of what is now King's Highway and Church Lane and some of the wounded were held in the Church.

Following the successful end of the War, the Church sent delegated to the first General Convention of the Protestant Episcopal Church in the United States.

== Pirates and the church ==
In 1736, William Leeds, a reputed cohort of the pirate Captain Kidd, had left a sizable glebe for the church. But the controversy over how the glebe came to be is what made the donation a topic of controversy.

Leeds, following a successful career as a pirate and profiteer, had settled, along with some of his fellow shipmates, in the Ideal Beach section of Middletown and married some of the township women. In order for him to make good after his deeds as a pirate, he set up a trust that would be given to both the Middletown and Shrewsbury Christ Churches following his death. The trust included any money and his property at Swimming River, in Leedsville (now Lincroft).

Is it believed that his sizable wealth came, most likely, as a result of is plundering since Leeds was a Society of Friends member and took no part in any piratical violence. Leeds died in 1739.
