= Grover House (Middletown, New Jersey) =

- U.S. National Register of Historic Places
- New Jersey Register of Historic Places
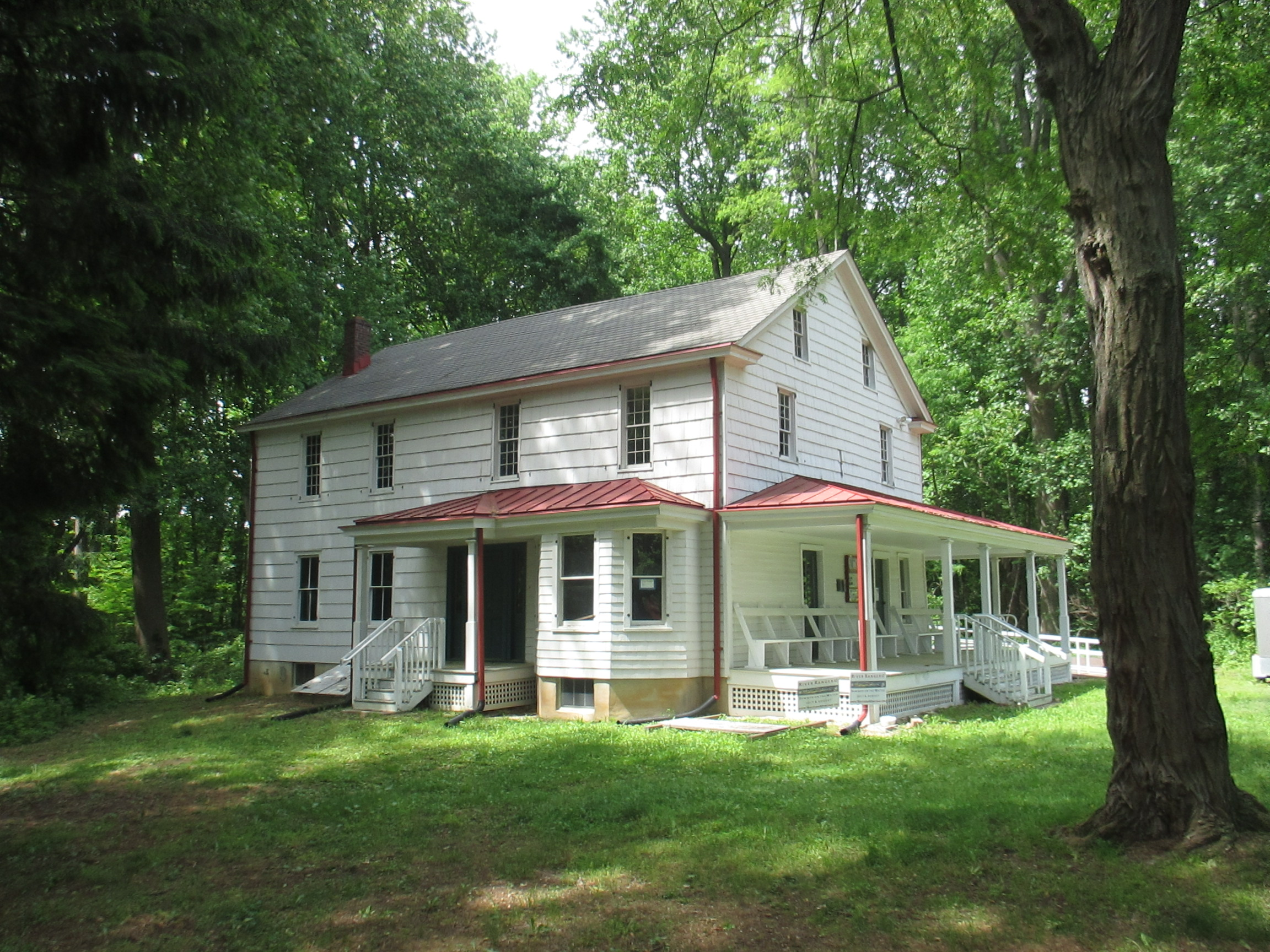

- Location within Monmouth County, New Jersey Location within New Jersey Location within the United States
- Location: 940 W. Front Street, Middletown Township, New Jersey
- Coordinates: 40°20′41″N 74°06′15″W
- Built: c. 1730
- Architectural style: Dutch Colonial
- NRHP reference No.: 02001121
- NJRHP No.: 189

Significant dates
- Added to NRHP: October 10, 2002
- Designated NJRHP: August 14, 2002

The Grover House is located at 940 W. Front Street, near Red Bank, in Middletown Township of Monmouth County, New Jersey, United States. The historic Dutch Colonial house was built around 1730 by James Grover. It was added to the National Register of Historic Places on October 10, 2002, for its significance in architecture. Since 2014, it has been the headquarters of the Navesink Maritime Heritage Association.

The house was expanded around 1820 to 1840. According to the nomination form, it is one of the few remaining two-story Dutch-framed houses in the county. It has been moved from its original location and is now in the township's Stevenson Park. It was owned by a member of the Grover family until 1983.

== See also ==
- National Register of Historic Places listings in Monmouth County, New Jersey
- List of the oldest buildings in New Jersey
