= MacLeod–Rice House =

- U.S. National Register of Historic Places
- New Jersey Register of Historic Places
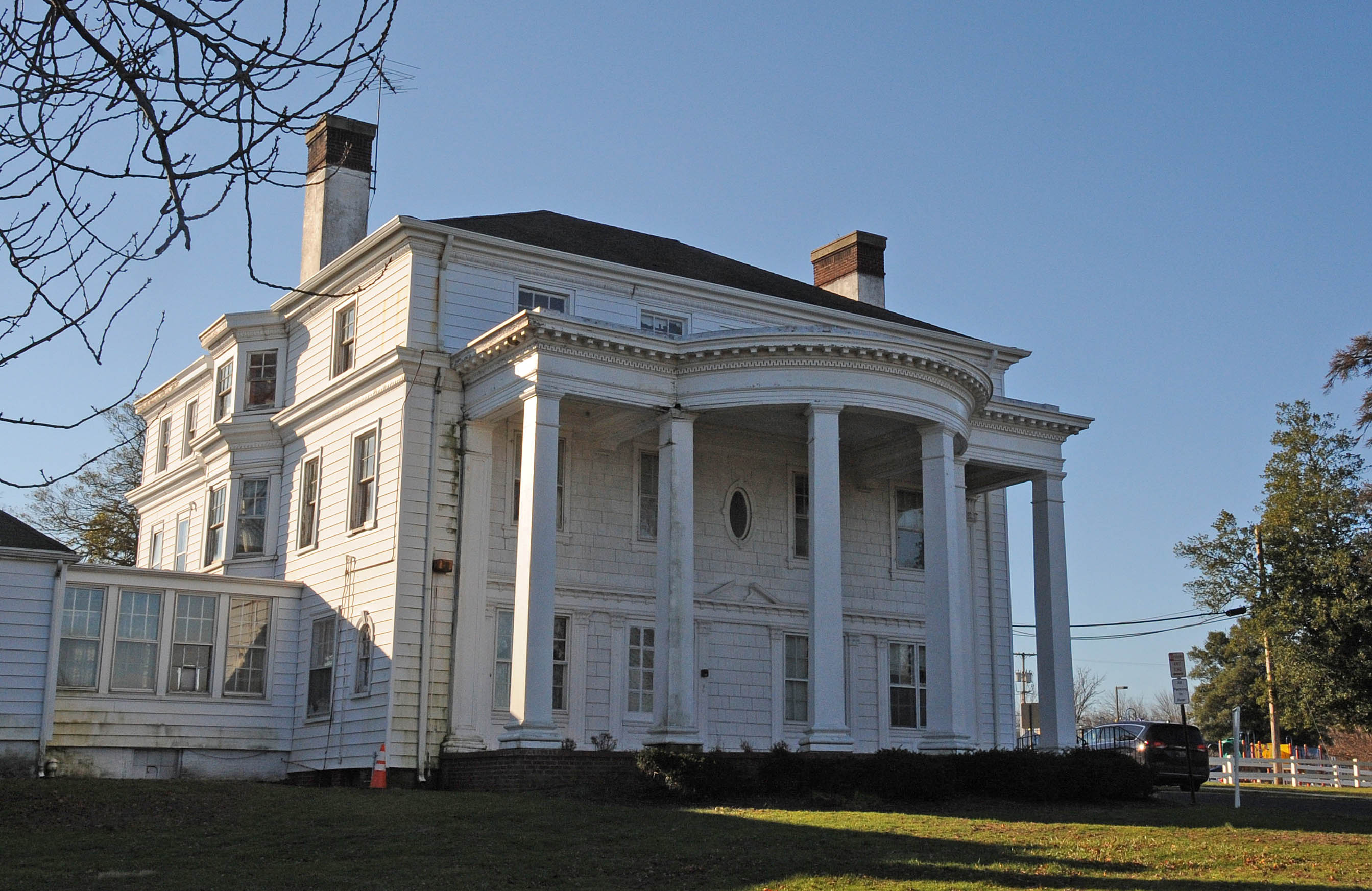

- Location within Monmouth County, New Jersey Location within New Jersey Location within the United States
- Location: 900 Leonardville Road, Middletown Township, New Jersey
- Coordinates: 40°24′38.6″N 74°03′18.4″W
- Built: 1894, 1915
- Architect: L. Jerome Aimar; Thomas Emery; Ernest A. Arend
- Architectural style: Colonial Revival
- NRHP reference No.: 100003203
- NJRHP No.: 5680

Significant dates
- Added to NRHP: December 3, 2018
- Designated NJRHP: October 10, 2018

The MacLeod–Rice House, also known as Croydon Hall, is located at 900 Leonardville Road in the Leonardo section of Middletown Township in Monmouth County, New Jersey, United States. The historic Colonial Revival house was added to the National Register of Historic Places on December 3, 2018, for its significance in architecture.

Donald W. MacLeod had the T. Burdge homestead converted to feature Queen Anne architecture by architect L. Jerome Aimar in 1894. Architect Thomas Emery designed a library addition in 1901. After MacLeod's death in 1901, Melvin A. Rice married his widow. Rice had the house design changed to feature Colonial Revival style by architect Ernest A. Arend in 1915. A large, two-story curved portico was added. In the 1940s, it was used as a school, and known as the Croydon Hall Academy.

== See also ==
- National Register of Historic Places listings in Monmouth County, New Jersey
