= Dr. Robert W. Cooke Medical Office =

- U.S. National Register of Historic Places
- New Jersey Register of Historic Places
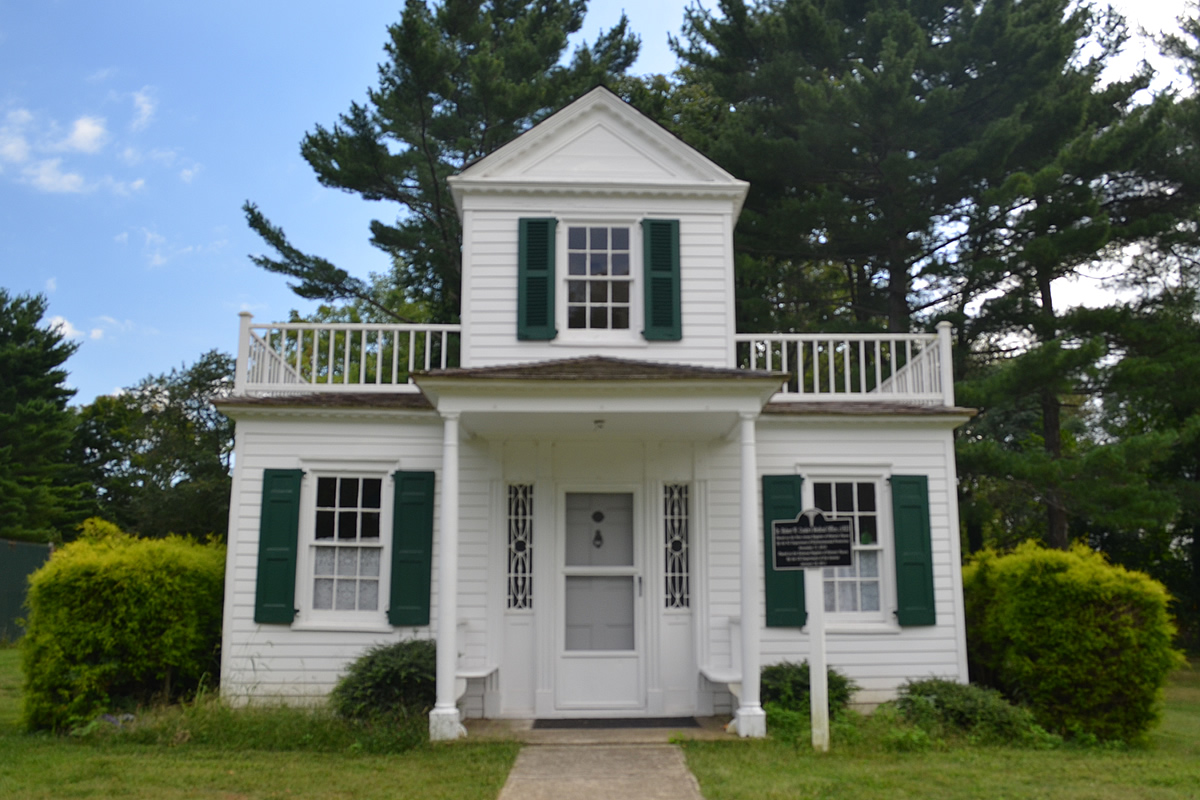

- Location within Monmouth County, New Jersey Location within New Jersey Location within the United States
- Location: 67 McCampbell Road, Holmdel Township, New Jersey
- Coordinates: 40°20′44.5″N 74°10′19.7″W
- Built: c. 1823
- Architectural style: Federal
- NRHP reference No.: 10001145
- NJRHP No.: 4972

Significant dates
- Added to NRHP: January 18, 2011
- Designated NJRHP: November 17, 2010

The Dr. Robert W. Cooke Medical Office is located at 67 McCampbell Road in Holmdel Township in Monmouth County, New Jersey, United States. Built around 1823, the historic Federal style building was documented by the Historic American Buildings Survey (HABS) in 1940. It was added to the National Register of Historic Places on January 18, 2011, for its significance in architecture and health/medicine. It is now owned by the Holmdel Historical Society.

== History and description ==
Robert W. Cooke (1797–1867) practiced medicine from this building for more than 40 years. He was also Holmdel's first postmaster. His son. Dr. Henry Gansevoort Cooke (1833–1919), practiced medicine here until 1909. THe building has been moved twice, first in 1910, and then in 1994.

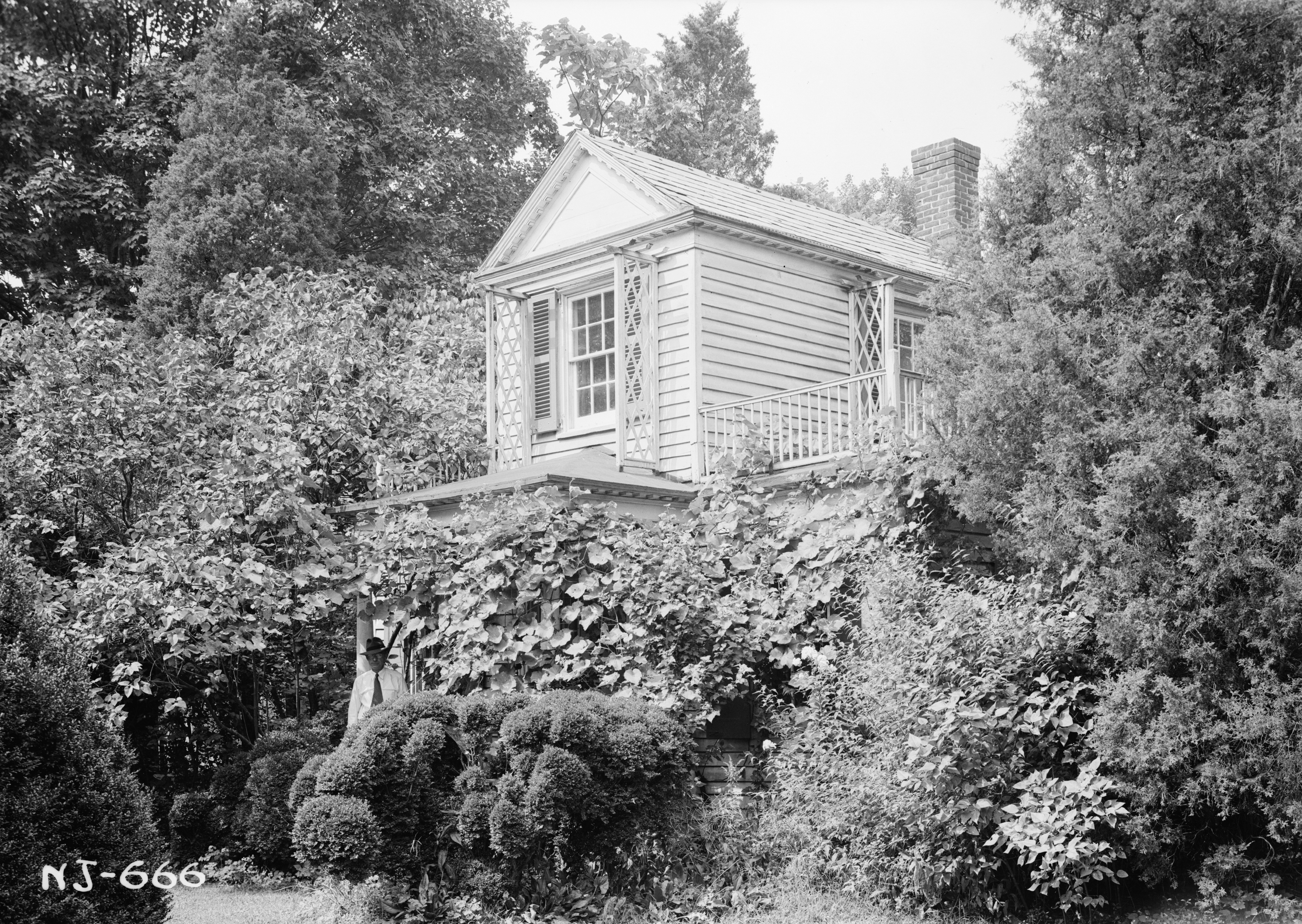
HABS photo from 1940

== See also ==
- National Register of Historic Places listings in Monmouth County, New Jersey
- List of museums in New Jersey
