= Trinity Church (Asbury Park, New Jersey) =

- U.S. National Register of Historic Places
- New Jersey Register of Historic Places
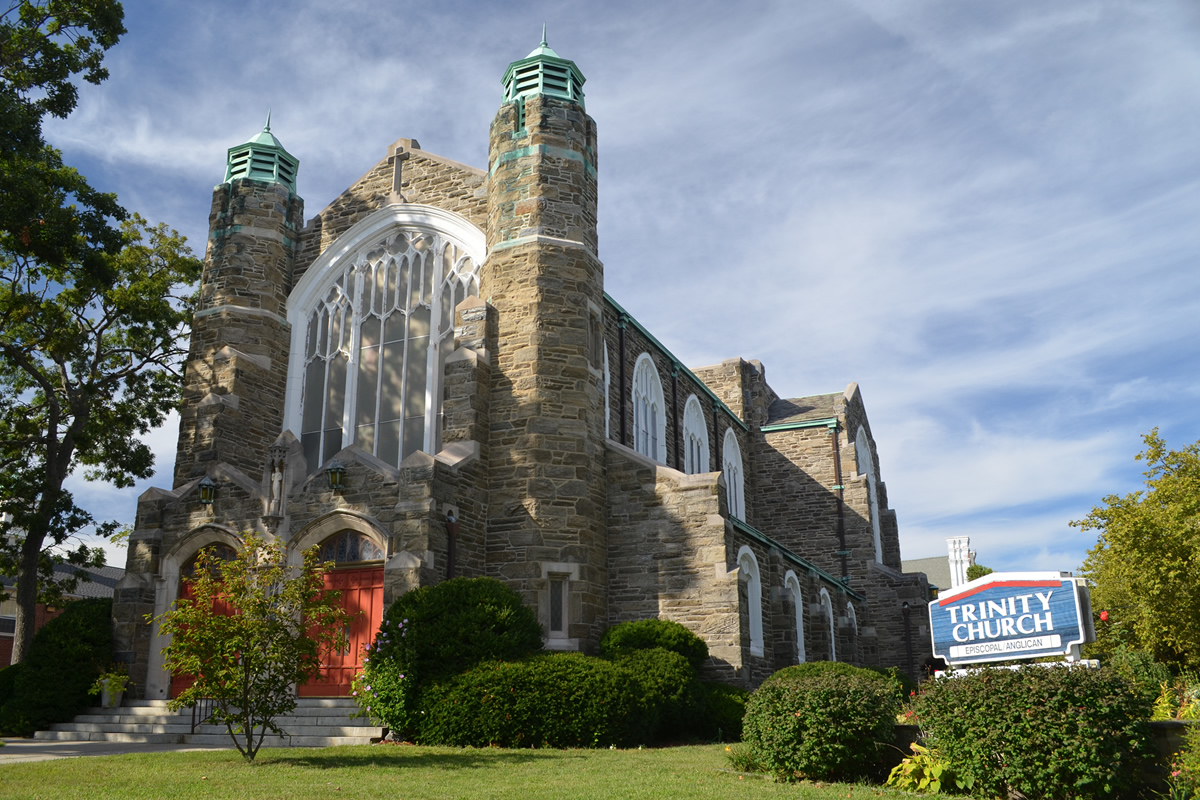

- Location within Monmouth County, New Jersey Location within New Jersey Location within the United States
- Location: 503 Asbury Avenue, Asbury Park, New Jersey
- Coordinates: 40°13′11.5″N 74°00′27.5″W
- Built: 1908–1911
- Architect: Clarence Wilson Brazer
- Architectural style: Late Gothic Revival, Colonial Revival
- NRHP reference No.: 14000465
- NJRHP No.: 5152

Significant dates
- Added to NRHP: August 6, 2014
- Designated NJRHP: May 8, 2014

Trinity Church, also known as Trinity Episcopal Church, is located at 503 Asbury Avenue in the city of Asbury Park in Monmouth County, New Jersey, United States. Built from 1908 to 1911, the historic Late Gothic Revival stone church was added to the National Register of Historic Places on August 6, 2014, for its significance in architecture. It is a parish of the Episcopal Diocese of New Jersey. The church reported 424 members in 2015 and 251 members in 2023; no membership statistics were reported in 2024 parochial reports. Plate and pledge income reported for the congregation in 2024 was $370,130 with average Sunday attendance (ASA) of 151 persons.

== History and description ==
The church was designed by the architect Clarence Wilson Brazer and features Late Gothic Revival style. He also designed the nearby St. James' Church in Long Branch. A brick school building designed by John C. Dodd with Colonial Revival style was built around 1960.

== See also ==
- National Register of Historic Places listings in Monmouth County, New Jersey
