= Frederic A. Duggan First Aid and Emergency Squad Building =

- Frederic A. Duggan, First Aid and Emergency Squad Building
- U.S. National Register of Historic Places
- New Jersey Register of Historic Places
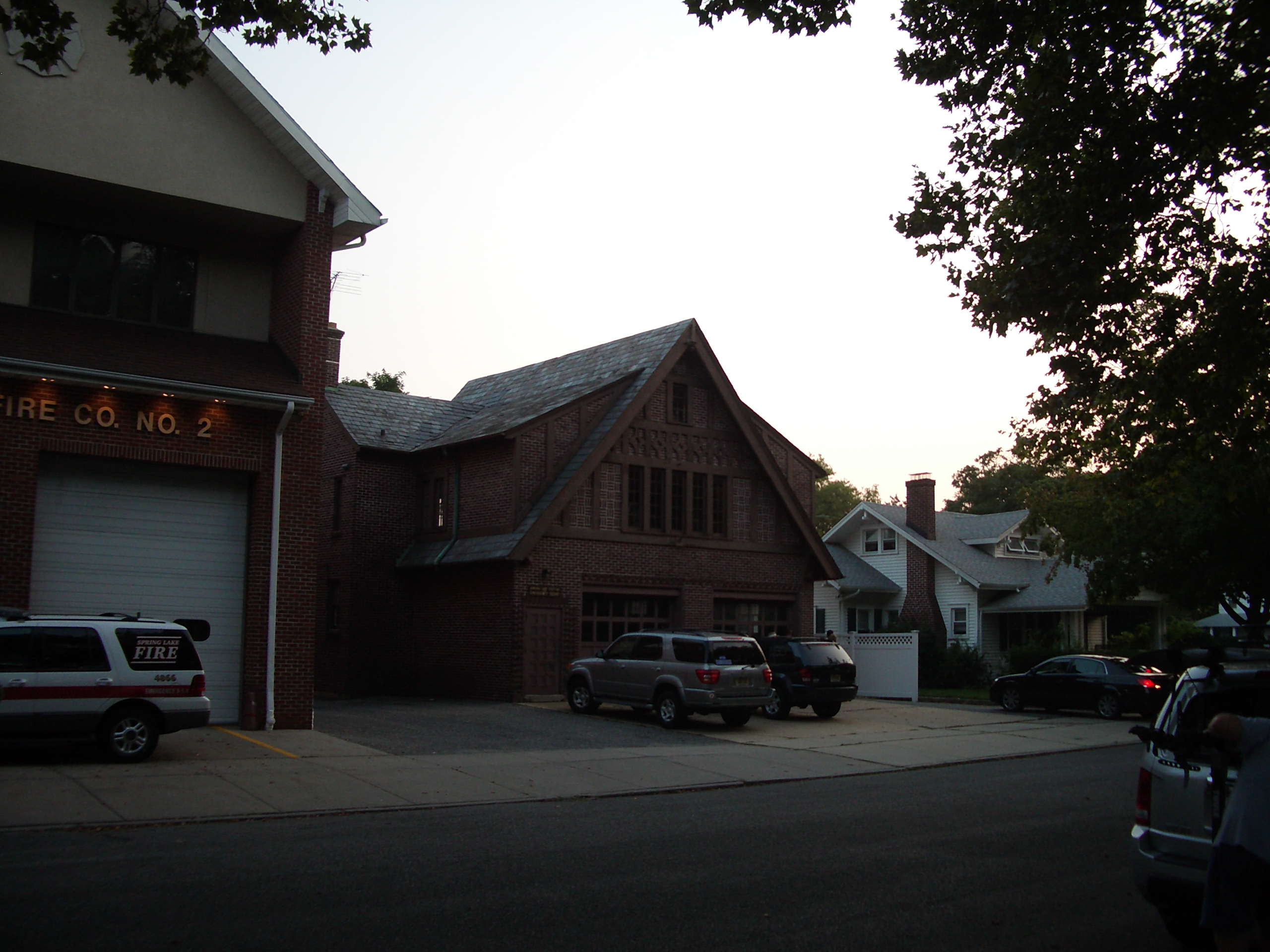

- Location within Monmouth County, New Jersey Location within New Jersey Location within the United States
- Location: 311 Washington Avenue, Spring Lake, New Jersey
- Coordinates: 40°9′19″N 74°1′45″W
- Area: less than one acre
- Built: 1934
- Architect: Schmieder, Emil Henry
- Architectural style: Tudor Revival
- NRHP reference No.: 98001177
- NJRHP No.: 3366

Significant dates
- Added to NRHP: September 18, 1998
- Designated NJRHP: June 30, 1998

The Frederic A. Duggan, First Aid and Emergency Squad Building is located in Spring Lake, Monmouth County, New Jersey, United States. The building was constructed in 1934 and added to the National Register of Historic Places on September 18, 1998.

The building was actively utilized by the Spring Lake First Aid and Emergency Squad until 2004, when the Squad moved out to a larger building in the same street. While in use, it was the oldest first aid squad building in the country. It was remodeled after being vacated, and reopened in 2015 as a community building.

== See also ==
- National Register of Historic Places listings in Monmouth County, New Jersey
