= Manasquan Friends Meetinghouse and Burying Ground =

Historic meetinghouse in New Jersey, United States

- U.S. National Register of Historic Places
- New Jersey Register of Historic Places
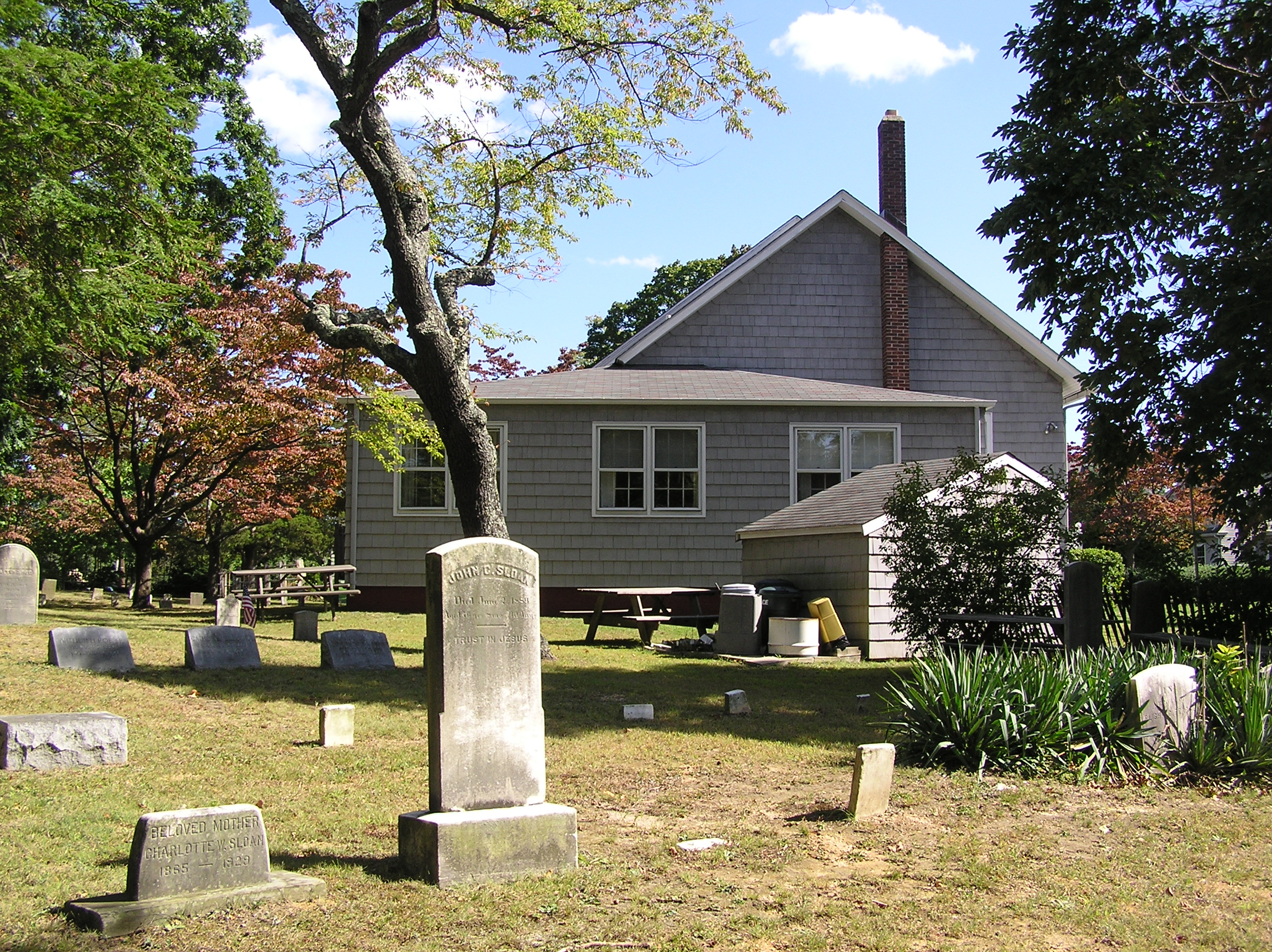

- Location within Monmouth County, New Jersey Location within New Jersey Location within the United States
- Location: NJ 35 at Manasquan Circle; Wall Township, New Jersey
- Nearest city: Manasquan, New Jersey
- Coordinates: 40°7′58″N 74°3′53″W
- Built: 1884
- Architectural style: Vernacular 19th century
- NRHP reference No.: 91000902
- NJRHP No.: 2077

Significant dates
- Added to NRHP: July 22, 1992
- Designated NJRHP: June 6, 1991

The Manasquan Friends Meetinghouse and Burying Ground, also known as the Manasquan Monthly Meeting of the Religious Society of Friends, is a historic meetinghouse and cemetery on Route 35 at the Manasquan Circle in Wall Township in Monmouth County, New Jersey, United States. Meetinghouses are generally used for "meetings for worship" and "meetings for business". Built in 1884, it was added to the National Register of Historic Places on July 22, 1992, for its significance in religion.

== See also ==
- National Register of Historic Places listings in Monmouth County, New Jersey
