= Allen House (Shrewsbury, New Jersey) =

Historic house in New Jersey, United States

- U.S. National Register of Historic Places
- New Jersey Register of Historic Places
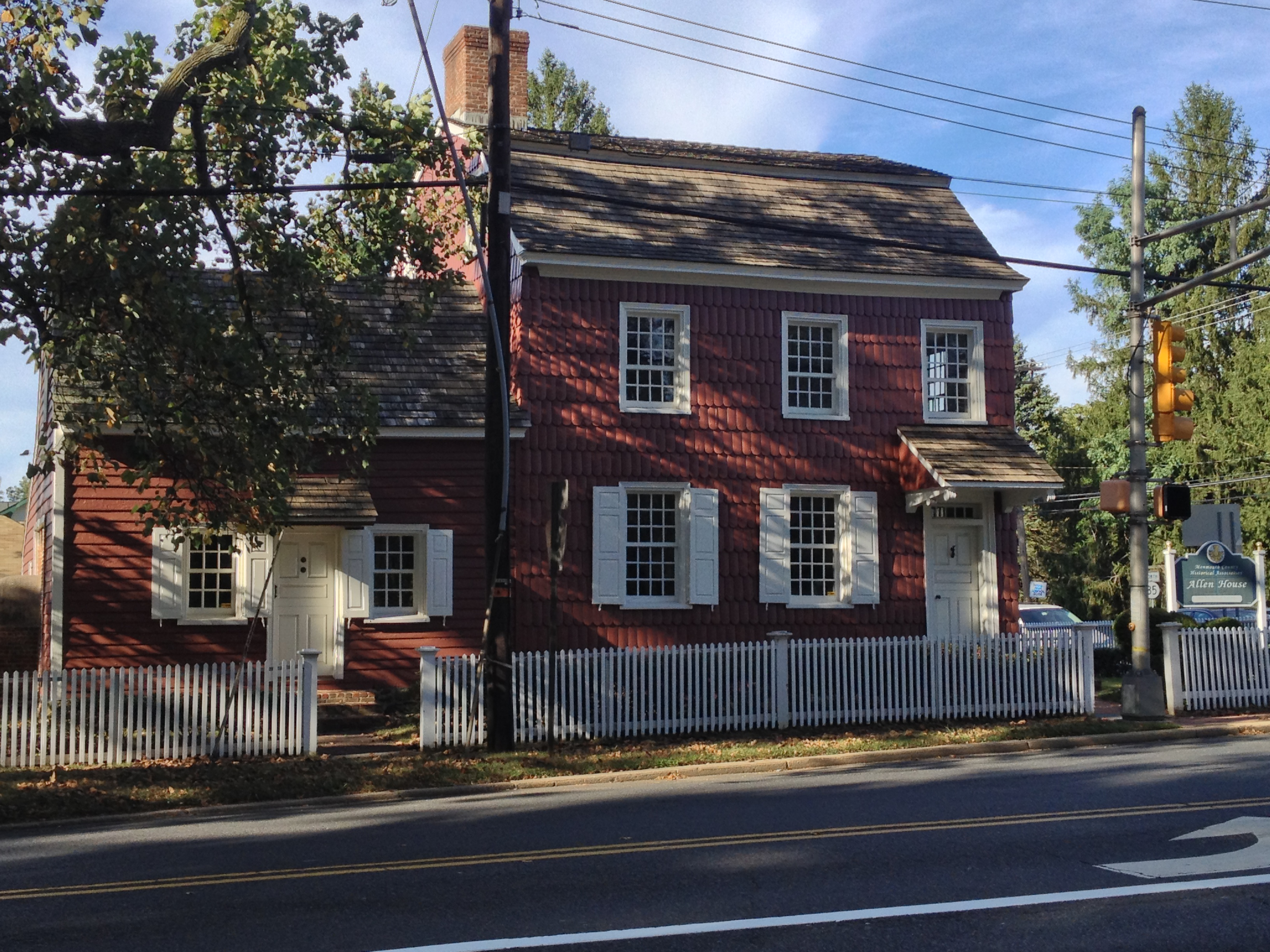

- Location within Monmouth County, New Jersey Location within New Jersey Location within the United States
- Location: Broad Street and Sycamore Avenue, Shrewsbury, New Jersey
- Coordinates: 40.32407°N 74.06178°W
- Area: 1.5 acres (0.61 ha)
- Built: c. 1710
- Architect: Judah Allen
- Architectural style: Georgian
- NRHP reference No.: 74001180
- NJRHP No.: 2054

Significant dates
- Added to NRHP: May 8, 1974
- Designated NJRHP: September 6, 1973

The Allen House is located in the borough of Shrewsbury in Monmouth County, New Jersey, United States. The historic house, which would later function as a tavern, was built around 1710 as a second residence for the Stillwell family of New York. Richard, a wealthy merchant, and his wife Mercy had eight children who were brought up primarily in Shrewsbury. By 1754, after Richard and Mercy had died, their heirs sold the property to Josiah Halstead who transformed the home into the Blue Ball Tavern, "the most noted tavern in Shrewsbury." Taverns served as community centers in the 18th century as much as places to drink and eat. The Vestry of Christ Church held meetings there as did the Shrewsbury Library Company and the Monmouth County Circuit Court.

During the American Revolutionary War in 1779, a Loyalist party raided the tavern where Continental troops were quartered. They killed 3 and captured 9 in what would become known as the Allen House Massacre. The house is furnished to reflect its use as a colonial tavern.

The tavern was added to the National Register of Historic Places on May 8, 1974, for its significance in architecture and military history.

The house is one of several houses owned and operated as a historic house museum by the Monmouth County Historical Association.

== See also ==
- National Register of Historic Places listings in Monmouth County, New Jersey
- List of museums in New Jersey
- List of the oldest buildings in New Jersey
