= Hankinson–Moreau–Covenhoven House =

Historic house in New Jersey, United States

- U.S. National Register of Historic Places
- New Jersey Register of Historic Places
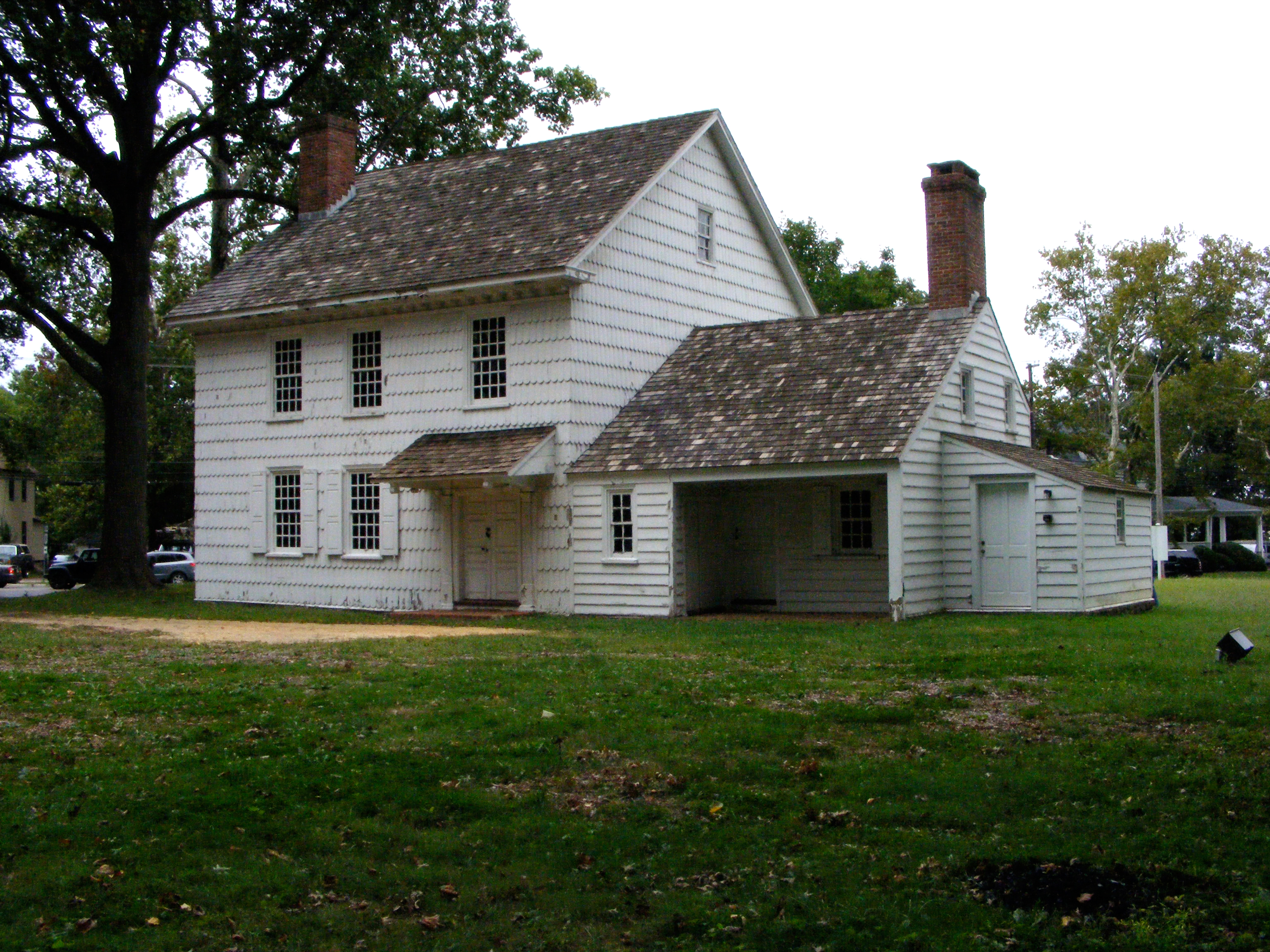

- Location within Monmouth County, New Jersey Location within New Jersey Location within the United States
- Location: 150 West Main Street, Freehold, New Jersey
- Coordinates: 40°15′7″N 74°17′19″W
- Built: c. 1752–1753
- Architect: William Covenhoven
- NRHP reference No.: 74001175
- NJRHP No.: 1976

Significant dates
- Added to NRHP: May 1, 1974
- Designated NJRHP: September 14, 1973

Covenhoven House, also known as General Clinton's Headquarters, is located at 150 West Main Street in Freehold Borough of Monmouth County, New Jersey, United States. The house was built around 1752–1753 by William and Elizabeth Covenhoven. The builder of the historic Old Tennent Church was retained for the job, and began work right after the completion of the church. In 1778, General Henry Clinton occupied this house as his headquarters from June 26 to the morning of June 28, prior to the Battle of Monmouth that day.

Clinton chose the house because it was clearly the finest home in the area. When he arrived there, he realized that Mrs. Covenhoven had already prepared for their visit. The house was devoid of the fine furnishings one would expect in such a home. The valuables had been hidden away in the woods, and the silver and china had been buried in the yard under some rose bushes. Clinton convinced Mrs. Covenhoven that her fine things would not be safe in the woods. If she returned them to the home, he said, they would be under the protection of the British army. She finally acquiesced, and the hidden wagon load was brought back to the house. According to a complaint she filed with the courthouse, she stated that once the wagon arrived, she was not allowed to bring anything inside the home. By morning, the entire wagon had been thoroughly ransacked, and virtually everything was pilfered except for a few insignificant items. One small act of mercy from Clinton was that he refrained from destroying the home; unlike the army, which had burned down several homes in the immediate area.

Covenhoven House, listed as the Hankinson–Moreau–Covenhoven House, was added to the National Register of Historic Places on May 1, 1974, for its significance in architecture, art, and military history. The house is one of several houses owned and operated as a historic house museum by the Monmouth County Historical Association.

== See also ==
- National Register of Historic Places listings in Monmouth County, New Jersey
- List of the oldest buildings in New Jersey
