= St. John's Episcopal Church (Little Silver, New Jersey) =

Historic church in New Jersey, United States

- U.S. National Register of Historic Places
- New Jersey Register of Historic Places
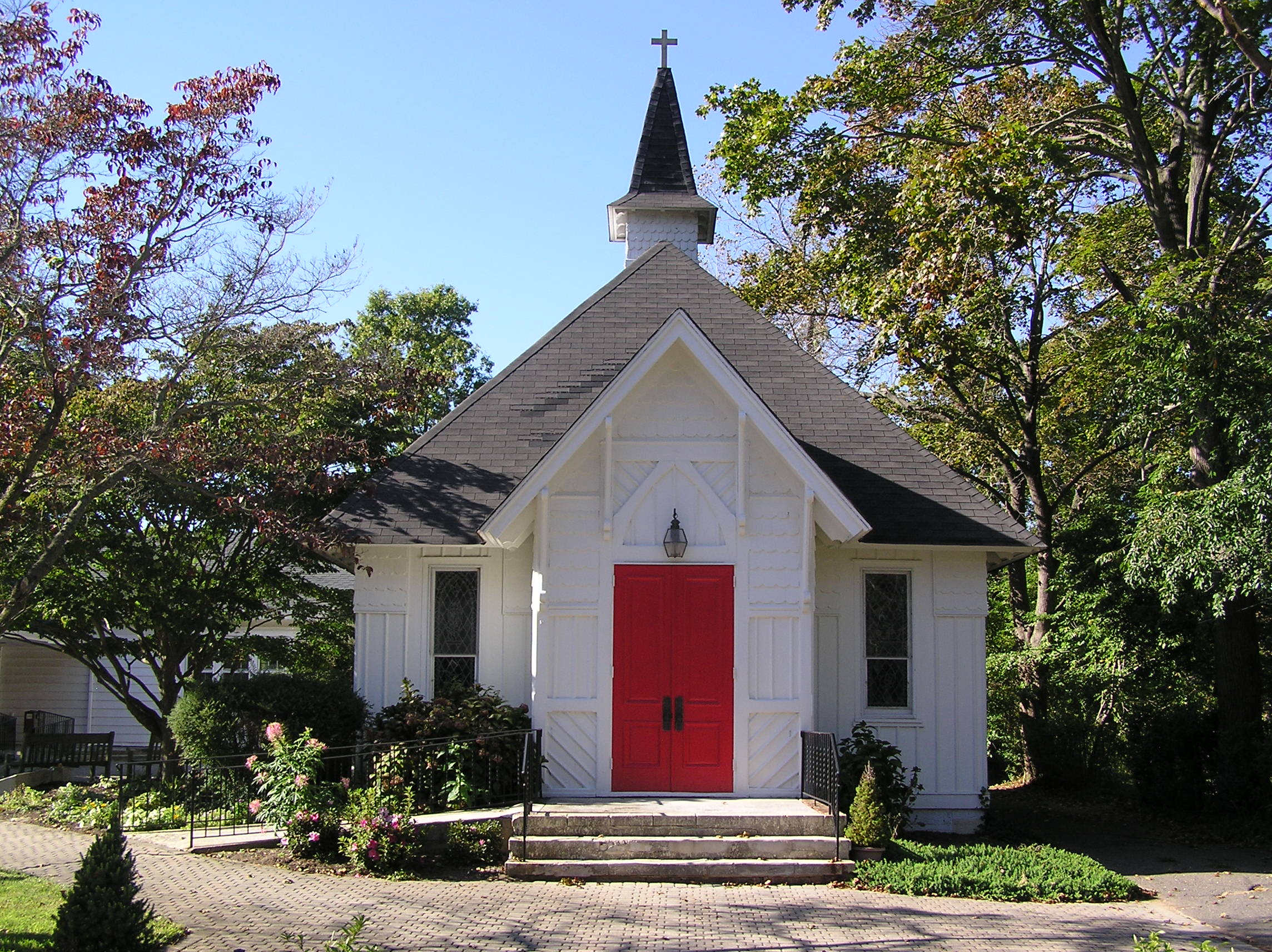

- Location within Monmouth County, New Jersey Location within New Jersey Location within the United States
- Location: Little Silver Point Rd., Little Silver, New Jersey
- Coordinates: 40°20′2″N 74°1′58″W
- Area: 0.2 acres (0.081 ha)
- Built: 1876
- Architect: Sidman, John E.
- Architectural style: Gothic Revival / Board and batten
- NRHP reference No.: 90001374
- NJRHP No.: 2001

Significant dates
- Added to NRHP: December 27, 1990
- Designated NJRHP: July 26, 1990

St. John's Episcopal Church is a historic church on Little Silver Point Road in Little Silver, Monmouth County, New Jersey. The church reported 260 members in 2015 and 139 members in 2023; no membership statistics were reported nationally in 2024 parochial reports. Plate and pledge income reported for the congregation in 2024 was $137,275. Average Sunday attendance (ASA) in 2023 was 33 people, down from a reported 70 in 2016.

It was built in 1876 and added to the National Register of Historic Places in 1990.
