= USS Manasquan =

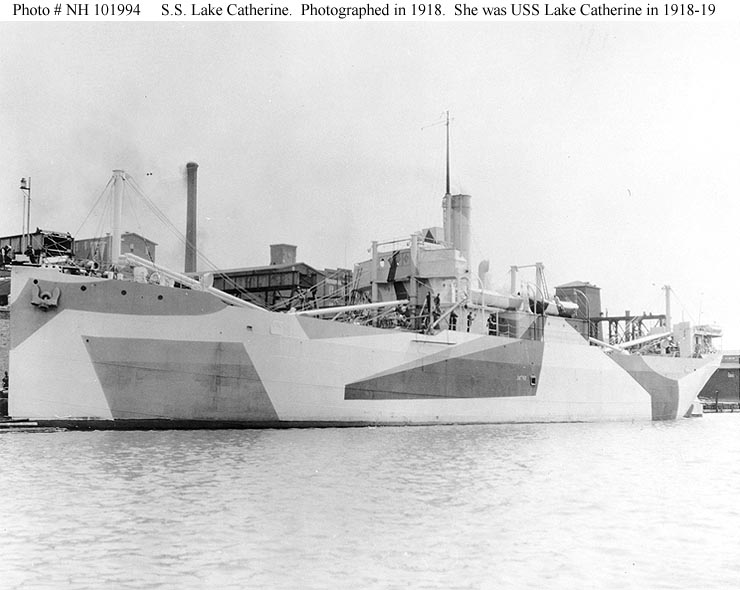

History

United States
- Name: USS Manasquan
- Namesake: Manasquan River
- Builder: Toledo Shipbuilding Company, Toledo, Ohio
- Launched: 25 May 1918
- Commissioned: 4 October 1918, as Lake Catherine (ID-3568)
- Decommissioned: 15 August 1919
- Acquired: 14 October 1941
- Recommissioned: 2 April 1942, as Manasquan (AG-36)
- Decommissioned: 22 February 1945
- Stricken: 30 October 1943
- Fate: Sold, 11 March 1946

General characteristics
- Type: Cargo ship
- Displacement: 2,580 long tons (2,621 t)
- Length: 261 ft (80 m)
- Beam: 43 ft 6 in (13.26 m)
- Draft: 18 ft 10 in (5.74 m)
- Speed: 10 knots (19 km/h; 12 mph)
- Complement: 58
- Armament: 1 × 4"/50 caliber gun; 4 × .50 cal (12.7 mm) machine guns; 2 × depth charge projectors

USS Manasquan (AG-36) was a cargo ship that served in the United States Navy at the end of World War I, and was reacquired during World War II and converted into a meteorological patrol vessel, and was also used in testing radio navigation systems.

The ship was built in 1918 as Lake Catherine by the Toledo Shipbuilding Company of Toledo, Ohio and taken over by the United States Shipping Board at New York City on 4 October 1918, and commissioned the same day for duty with the Naval Overseas Transportation Service (NOTS) as USS Lake Catherine (ID-3568).

== Service history ==
=== World War I, 1918–1919 ===
After steaming to Norfolk, Virginia and back to load cargo, Lake Catherine departed New York in convoy on 19 October and steamed to Rochefort, France, where she arrived on 10 November - one day before the Armistice ended the fighting on the Western Front.

Assigned to coaling duty, she operated between British and French ports until 24 February 1919 when she arrived Rotterdam, the Netherlands. Two days later she began service for the U.S. Food Administration. While en route to Danzig, Germany, on 3 March, she rescued nine survivors after the German trawler Berthold struck a mine and sank.

Lake Catherine continued food relief runs until 5 July when she departed Barry, Wales, for the United States. Loaded with general military cargo, she arrived New York on 8 August. She decommissioned on 15 August and was returned to the U.S. Shipping Board the same day.

=== In merchant service, 1919–1941 ===
Subsequently, Lake Catherine resumed merchant service. She was renamed Oscar J. Lingeman in 1926, and Aetna in 1937. Aetna was purchased by the Maritime Commission from her owner, Mid-West Transportation Co., Inc., Bay City, Michigan, in 1941, and transferred to the Navy on 14 October 1941. Renamed Manasquan on 15 October 1941, she was converted for use as a weather patrol ship by Bethlehem Steel Co. of East Boston, Massachusetts, and commissioned as Miscellaneous Auxiliary AG-36, under loan to the United States Coast Guard on 2 April 1942.

=== World War II, 1942–1946 ===
Manasquan served the important, but little praised weather patrol stations in the stormy, U-boat-infested North Atlantic. Equipped with special meteorological instruments, she plied her assigned patrol areas out of Boston, and Argentia, Newfoundland. Braving dangers of the sea and submarines, she operated in isolation for weeks at a time to collect valuable weather data used in forecasting weather for the Atlantic area, north Africa, and Axis-occupied Western Europe. Realizing the strategic importance of data collected by weather patrol ships such as Manasquan, the chief of the U.S. Weather Bureau wrote during World War II: "...the weather reports from these vessels were among the most vital meteorological information for war operations of the United Nations....The difficulty and hardships of service on these station vessels was fully recognized but the value of their reports more than compensated for those difficulties, and the men so serving were performing duties of high priority in the war effort."

In addition, Manasquan took part in the initial at-sea testing of LORAN (long-range navigation) system, which became of inestimable value both to naval and merchant ships and to military and commercial aircraft.

As a result of experiments conducted by MIT's Radiation Laboratory, by the Bell Telephone Laboratory, and by the National Defense Research Committee during the final months of American neutrality in 1941, the impetus for full development occurred in the hectic months after Pearl Harbor. Under Rear Admiral Julius A. Furer, coordinator of research and development for the Secretary of the Navy, the Navy provided "active and aggressive sponsorship" for the project. Capt. Lawrence M. Harding, USCG, who later coined the word LORAN, played an important role in the research aspects of its development.

By June 1942 the system was ready for environmental testing. From mid-June to mid-July Manasquan, equipped with special receiving instruments, successfully carried out the first shipboard tests which proved the feasibility and practicality of the system. As a result of these tests, construction and completion of the important seven-unit northwest Atlantic chain, which extended from Delaware to Greenland, was completed in less than a year.

Manasquan continued weather patrol duty during the remainder of World War II. She collided at dock with the USCGC Cactus, causing considerable damage to the tender. In mid-1943 she was rebuilt at the Coast Guard Yard at Curtis Bay, Maryland, as a gunnery practice ship. On 7 October 1944 she collided with the SS Edward Pearce, causing only slight damage, but destroying her sonar array. The Navy permanently transferred her to the U.S. Coast Guard on 22 October 1943, and she continued to serve as USCGC Manasquan (WAG-273). Her name was struck from the Navy List on 30 October 1943. From 29 August 1944 to 22 February 1945 she was assigned to the Coast Guard Academy and used for training duty. Following the end of the war, she was decommissioned on 22 February 1945, and was sold on 11 March 1946.
