= Glimmer Glass Bridge =

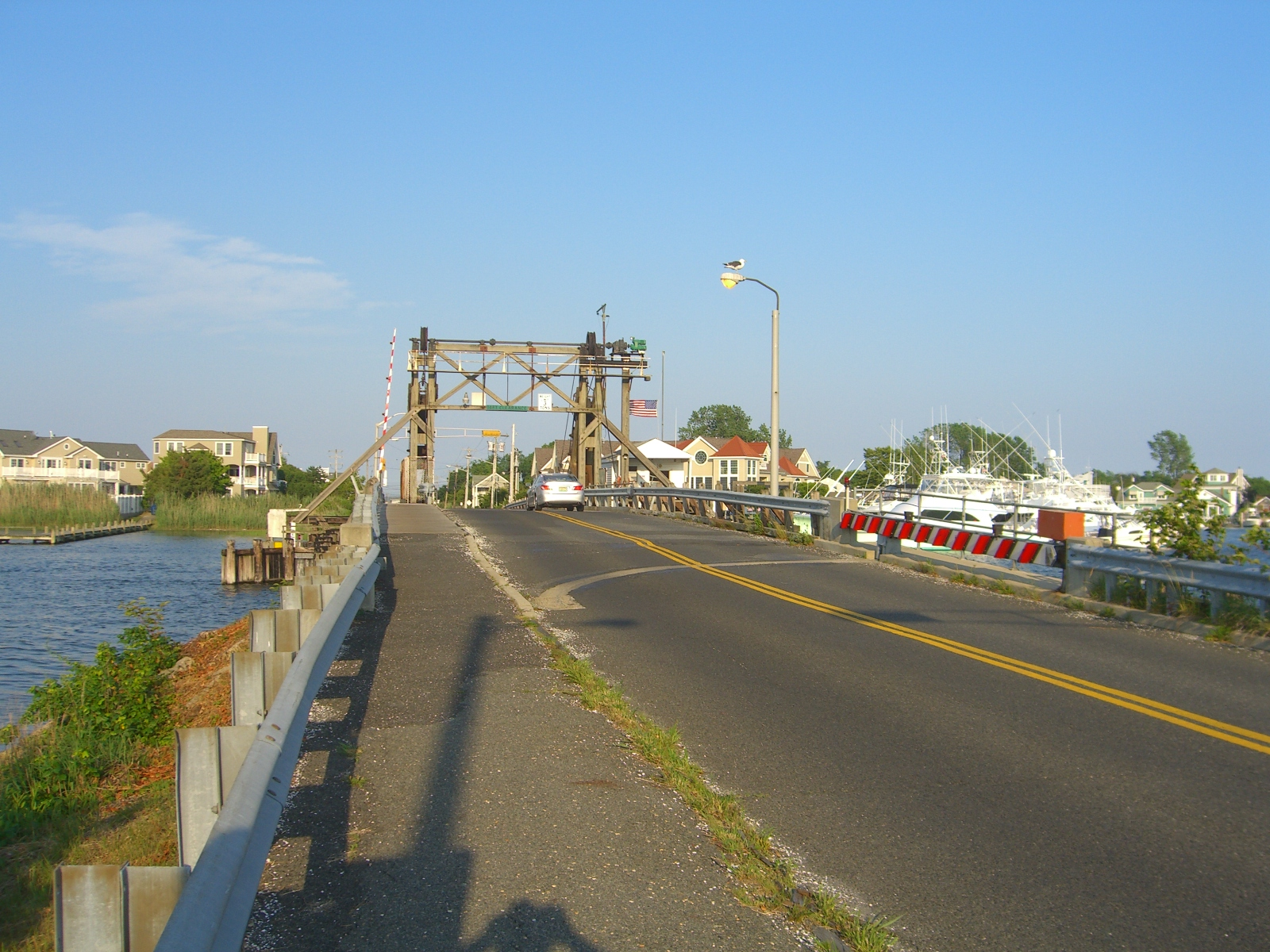
- The bridge as seen from the Brielle side
- Coordinates: 40°06′42″N 74°02′40″W
- Carries: Fisk Avenue (Brielle side); Brielle Road (Manasquan side); Green Avenue (interssction)
- Crosses: Glimmer Glass Creek
- Locale: Manasquan, New Jersey and Brielle, New Jersey
- Official name: Brielle Road Bridge over the Glimmer Glass (W-9)
- Other name: Brielle Road Bridge W-9
- Named for: Glimmer Glass Creek
- Owner: County of Monmouth
- Maintained by: Monmouth County Department of Public Works and Engineering
- NBI: 13000W9

Characteristics
- Design: Lift bascule
- Material: Steel, wrought iron, wood
- Total length: 278.9 ft (85.0 m)
- Width: 20 ft (6.1 m)
- Height: 14.1 ft (4.3 m)
- Longest span: 34.1 ft (10.4 m)
- Clearance below: 6.9 ft (2.1 m)

History
- Opened: August 13, 1938

Statistics
- Daily traffic: 6,846 (2013)
- Brielle Road Bridge over the Glimmer Glass
- U.S. National Register of Historic Places
- New Jersey Register of Historic Places
- Location within Monmouth County, New Jersey
- Coordinates: 40°06′42.61″N 74°02′41.85″W
- Built: 1938
- Architectural style: Lift bascule bridge
- NRHP reference No.: 08000336
- NJRHP No.: 4307

Significant dates
- Designated: April 25, 2008
- Designated NJRHP: February 28, 2008

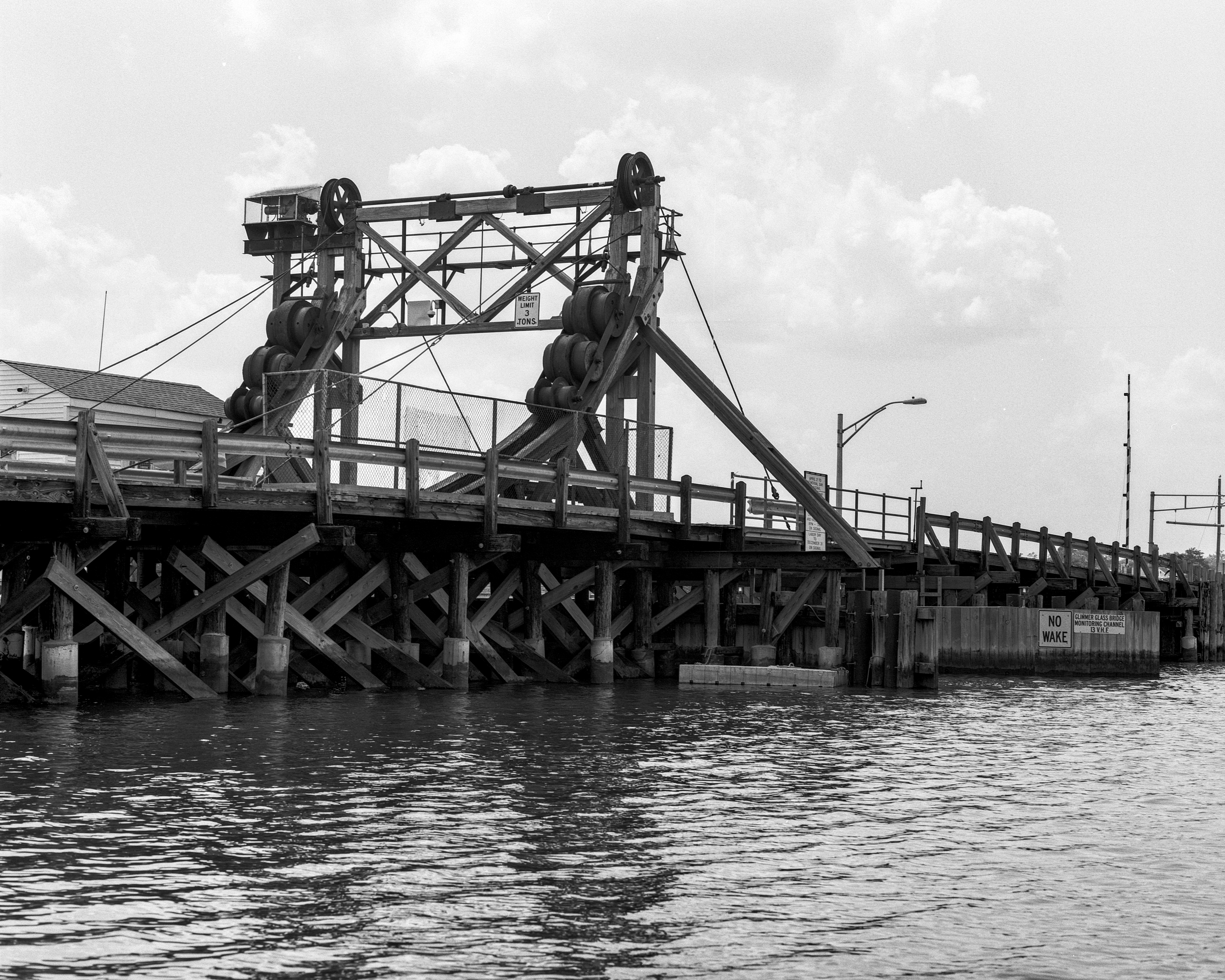
In the closed position, cylindrical counterweights rest at the top of the curved tracks

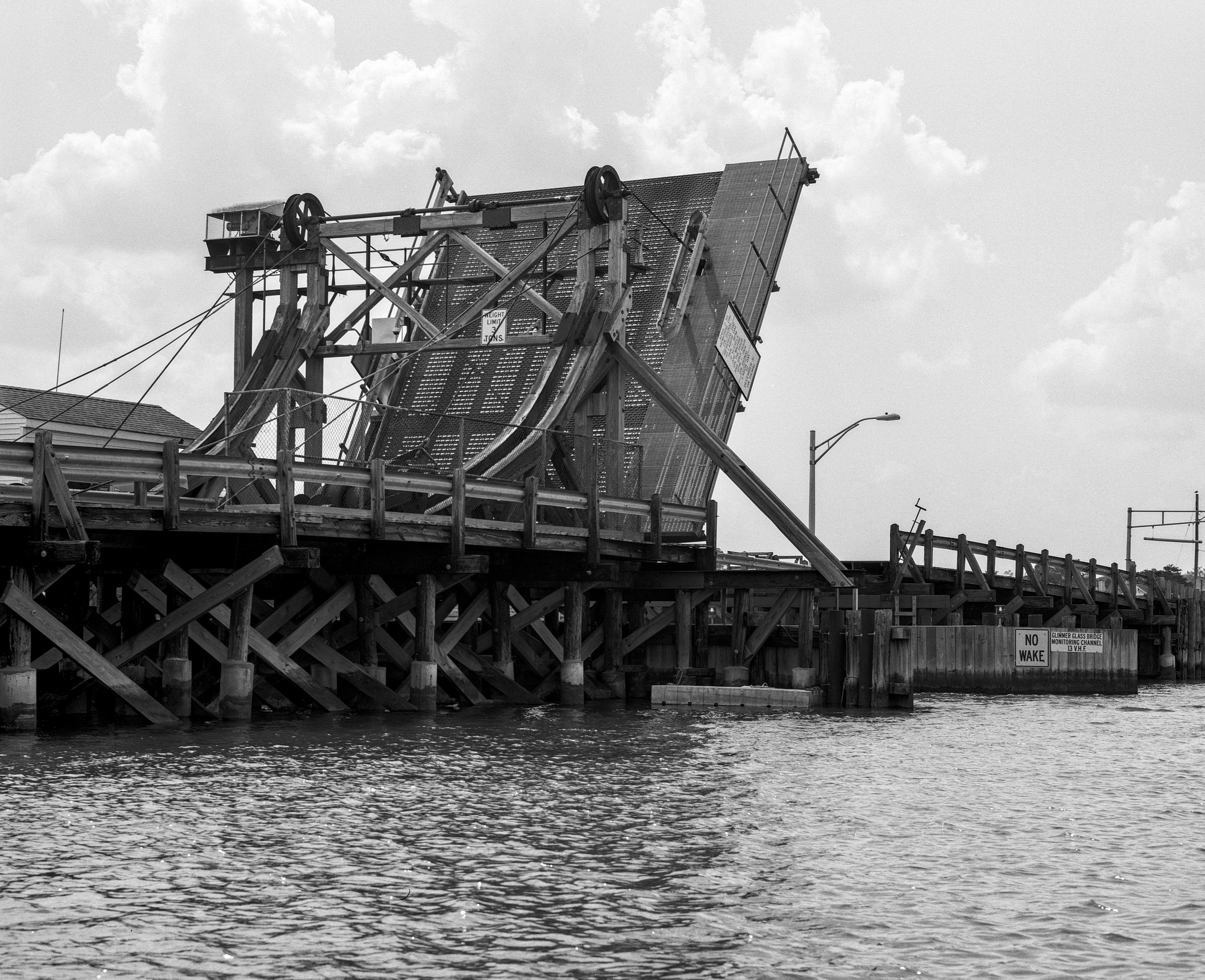
In the open position, the counterweights roll down to the bottom of the curved tracks and pull cables connected to the span

The Glimmer Glass Bridge is a county owned bridge in Monmouth County, New Jersey, United States. It carries traffic from Brielle Road over the Glimmer Glass, a navigable tidal inlet of the Manasquan River, between Manasquan and Brielle. It has also been on the National Register of Historic Places, since 2008. Due to its age, Commercial vehicles cannot be driven over it. It also allows Bicycles and pedestrians to walk on the wooden sidewalk.

== History ==
The Glimmer Glass Bridge was built in 1938 and dedicated on August 13th of that year as part of Manasquan's Big Sea Day. It was inserted into an existing fixed timber trestle constructed circa 1888 to carry Brielle Road over the salt marsh. It is a cable lift Bélidor style bascule bridge, using a rolling counterweight design and is technologically and historically significant as the only example of its type in New Jersey. It may also be the only example in the eastern half of the United States.

Scientific American in an 1896 issue described a recently completed nearby bridge on the Erie Railroad on its main line over Berrys Creek near Rutherford, New Jersey:

"...although the principle behind the design is not entirely new, the Berry's Creek Bridge is the first application of this system of counter weighing for a structure of this magnitude."

The principle is to use a curved track and rolling counterweights where the work expended in raising the leaf is equal to the energy released by the falling counterweight. The toe end of the movable span is linked by cables to cylindrical rolling counterweights. The connecting cable passes over a tower column with a curved track. Moving the counterweights along the curved track thus raises or lowers the bridge. The work expended in raising the leaf is equal to the energy released by the falling counterweight. The toe end of the moveable span is linked by cables to cylindrical rolling counterweights. The rolling counterweight single-leaf bascule bridge with a deck girder movable leaf is the only example of the late 19th-century bridge type in the state of New Jersey and possibly the entire country. It was, at the time, a popular design for railroads in New Jersey for spanning canals.

The bridge has been rebuilt several times. The wood tower column and track were redone in 1957 and 1971, and the steel grid deck on the ca. 1950 deck girder movable span was installed in 1962. However, the integrity of the original design has been maintained and it operates in the original manner.

In 2014, the bridge was damaged by an overweight truck. The county has since considered to replace it with a modern structure; the plan has been met with protest.

== Community ==
The Glimmer Glass Bridge is located in a salt marsh lowland surrounded by what was once a seasonal community of small bungalows and cottages. It connects the historic shore towns of Manasquan and Brielle on Brielle Road with the mainland over Glimmer Glass Creek/Watson Creek to Brielle by way of Fisk Avenue. In both towns, however, the structures have been modified and new homes have been built in Manasquan and neighboring Brielle, leaving the area near the bridge not eligible for historic district status as determined by the State of New Jersey.

== Closure and repairs ==
In August 2014, the bridge was closed due to significant damage to sections of the bridge deck, which appeared to have been caused by a severe overload (by a truck). The bridge had a posted three-ton limit. Initial assessments indicated that the repair work could have taken up to three weeks to complete. However, after a more detailed inspection, it was determined that the damage combined with the age of the bridge eliminated the option of a quick fix.

The Monmouth County Board of Chosen Freeholders awarded the contract to Howell-based George Harms Construction Co. to make the repairs, which local officials said included replacing its pilings and removing and replacing rotted wooden joists. The estimated price tag to replace the bridge was more than $20 million, and the county would look for federal funding for that work.

The work to repair the 279-foot bridge, which connects Brielle and Manasquan over a tidal inlet, began on October 1. Despite record cold temperatures, several winter storms and exceptional high tides, 11 weeks ahead of schedule, the bridge reopened to traffic on March 13, 2015.

Some officials have raised concerns regarding the safety and utility of the bridge. One of the main points of concern is the weight limit of 3 tons which restricts emergency vehicles from accessing the Southeastern section of the Borough of Manasquan. The monthly full moon high tide cycle often causes Main Street in Manasquan to close due to flooding which leaves emergency vehicles with only one access road to its beachfront, Ocean Road, as they exceed the weight capacity of the bridge.

However, some local residents who support the current historic bridge have formed the committee to save the Glimmer Glass Bridge, a group that seeks to preserve the structure. They assert that in addition to being a historic asset to the community, it is on the National Register of Historic Places, the cost to refurbish the existing bridge would be far less than the cost to replace it.

The Glimmer Glass Bridge will be closed for up to three months as work continues on the span, officials said.

The problem stems originally from a gearbox and motor that seized. The gearbox is 50 years old. The company that made it is still in operation "but refuses to get involved," Manasquan officials said.

Here's what the town is also saying:

- The county has to send the gearbox and motor to a company in Maine that is willing to examine the problem. The box has to be "broken" open (it is completely sealed) and the problem diagnosed and repaired if possible (part availability, etc.). The motor has to be replaced as well.
- Simultaneously, Monmouth County is considering bringing in a consultant to study the issue and determine whether a newer style gearbox might work. If so, and the old one is restored, there would be a backup so that a long outage for this cause in the future could be avoided.
- What has also been determined is that the pulleys (which are the only remaining original part on the bridge) are worn out. The top shaft that they attach to (which is undersized) and the pulleys themselves will be replaced during this period.
- Because the bridge is on the state and national historic register, the work is delayed while those offices are brought up to speed and weigh in.
- The county is "very aware of the public inconvenience and the public safety threat these circumstances present. "
