= Christ Church (Episcopal), Shrewsbury =

Historic church in New Jersey, United States

- U.S. National Register of Historic Places
- New Jersey Register of Historic Places
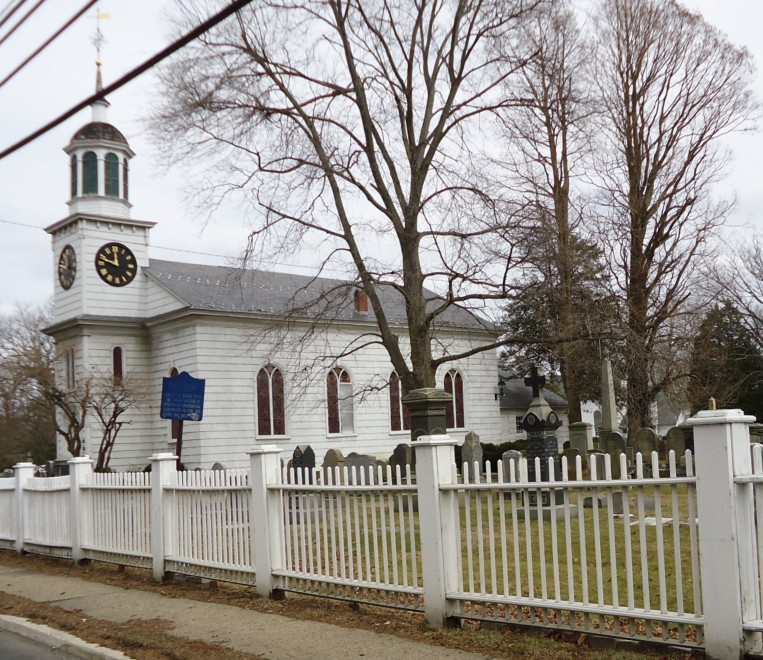

- Location within Monmouth County, New Jersey Location within New Jersey Location within the United States
- Location: Broad Street and Sycamore Avenue, Shrewsbury, NJ
- Coordinates: 40°19′25″N 74°3′40″W
- Area: 2 acres (0.81 ha)
- Built: 1769
- Architect: Smith, Robert
- Architectural style: Georgian
- NRHP reference No.: 95001184
- NJRHP No.: 2815

Significant dates
- Added to NRHP: October 25, 1995
- Designated NJRHP: September 8, 1995

Christ Church (Episcopal), Shrewsbury is an historic church building at the intersection of Broad Street and Sycamore Avenue in Shrewsbury, New Jersey. It is a parish of the Episcopal Diocese of New Jersey. The church reported 332 members in 2017 and 147 members in 2025. Plate and pledge income reported for the congregation in 2025 was $166,322 with average Sunday attendance (ASA) of 50 persons. The church building was constructed in 1769 and added to the National Register of Historic Places in 1995.
