= Asgill =

Asgill is a surname. Notable people with the surname include:

- Sir Charles Asgill, 1st Baronet (1713–1788), English banker and Lord Mayor of London
- General Sir Charles Asgill, 2nd Baronet (1762–1823), British Army general
- John Asgill (1659–1738), English writer and politician
