= Charles Asgill =

Charles Asgill may refer to:

- Sir Charles Asgill, 1st Baronet (1713–1788), merchant banker and Lord Mayor of London (1757–1758)
- Sir Charles Asgill, 2nd Baronet (1762–1823), British Army general
