= Huddy =

Huddy may refer to:

- Huddy (surname)
- Huddy, Kentucky
- Huddy Park, a park in Highlands, New Jersey
- Huddy (musician), American social media personality and musician
- Huddy, a neologism for the relationship between House and Cuddy on the television series House
- "Huddy", a 2018 song by American rapper Coi Leray
