= Asgill Affair =

1782 American Revolutionary War era controversy

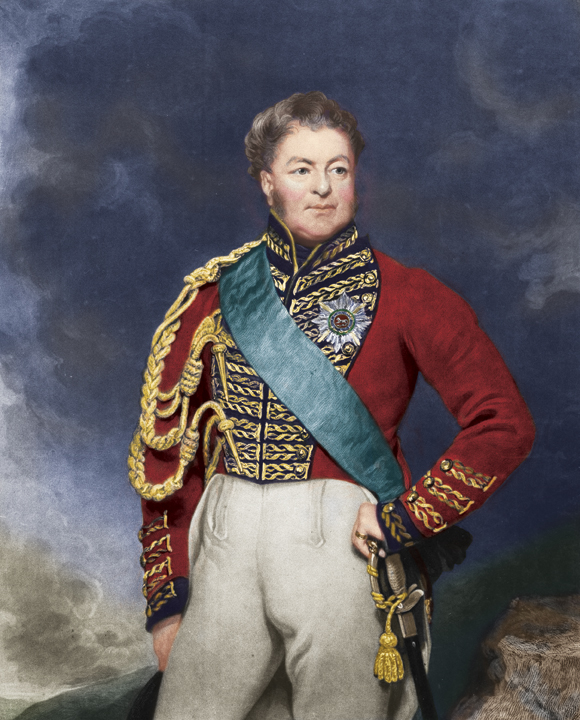
Colourised image of Charles Asgill, from a mezzotint of lost c. 1820 original by Thomas Phillips

The Asgill Affair or Huddy-Asgill Affair was a diplomatic incident during the American Revolution named after a British army officer, Captain Charles Asgill (and Captain Joshua "Jack" Huddy).

In retaliation for the execution of a Patriot officer, George Washington ordered the death of a British officer chosen by lot from prisoners; this selected Asgill. This was in direct contravention of the Articles of Capitulation signed when British forces surrendered at Yorktown which protected Asgill.

As allies to the Americans and signatories to the surrender document, the French monarchy became involved and let it be known that such measures would reflect badly on both the French and American nations, conveying the message through the French Foreign Minister, the comte de Vergennes, who wrote to Washington on 29 July 1782. After six months the Continental Congress agreed that Asgill should be released to return to England on parole.

== Background ==
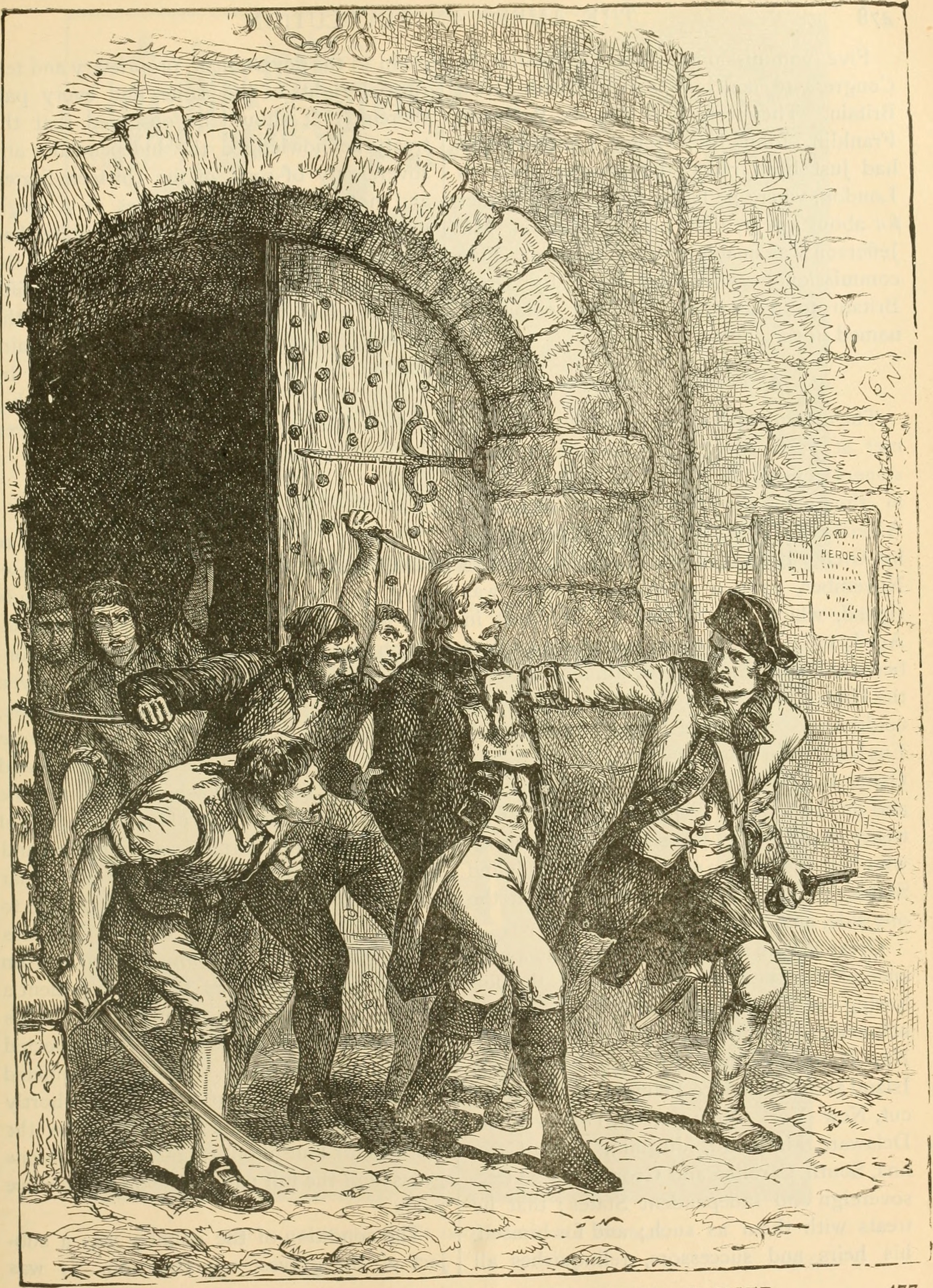
Joshua Huddy being led from prison to be hanged, early 20th century depiction

After the capitulation of the British forces at Yorktown in 1781, skirmishes and retaliatory acts between the Patriots and Loyalists continued. Loyalist Philip White was killed by Patriot militiamen in March 1782. According to The Economist, "Accounts of his death differ: his brother Aaron, captured with him, signed an affidavit attesting that he was killed while trying to escape. Aaron later recanted, claiming that his captors had threatened to kill him unless he signed; the truth, he now maintained, was that the American militiamen had executed Philip White in cold blood". Peter Henriques writes that "According to Loyalist accounts, his arms had been cut off and his legs broken and his corpse mutilated almost beyond recognition and shoveled into a makeshift grave".

In reprisal, Loyalists in Monmouth, New Jersey executed Captain Jack Huddy (who was not present when White was killed) on 12 April. Patriots in Monmouth sent General George Washington a petition demanding justice, indicating they would act if Washington did not. Huddy's execution was sanctioned by William Franklin, who signed the death warrant but was carried out by Richard Lippincott, who was eventually court martialled by the British for this crime, but was exonerated on account of him only having obeyed orders.

On 3 May 1782, Washington ordered General Moses Hazen, head of a prisoner-of-war camp in Lancaster, Pennsylvania, to select a British officer equal in rank to Huddy and not protected by any agreement with Great Britain to be hanged. Upon learning that there were no prisoners fitting this description, Washington, on 18 May, ordered Hazen to select from among protected officers. Carrying out this order put the U.S. in violation of the terms of the Yorktown surrender, which protected prisoners of war from acts of retaliation.

== Asgill's captivity ==
=== Washington's solution ===
On 27 May 1782, lots were drawn at the Black Bear Tavern, Lancaster, Pennsylvania, with Asgill's name being drawn by a drummer boy, together with the paper marked "Unfortunate", which put him under threat of execution. Asgill's fellow officer, Major James Gordon, protested in the strongest terms to both General Washington and Benjamin Lincoln, the Secretary of War, that this use of a lottery was illegal. In reporting the result to Carleton, Gordon also noted that "The delicate manner, in which General Hazen communicated his orders to the British officers, shows him to be a man of real feeling, and the mild treatment the prisoners have met with since we came to this place deserves the warmest acknowledgements of every British officer".

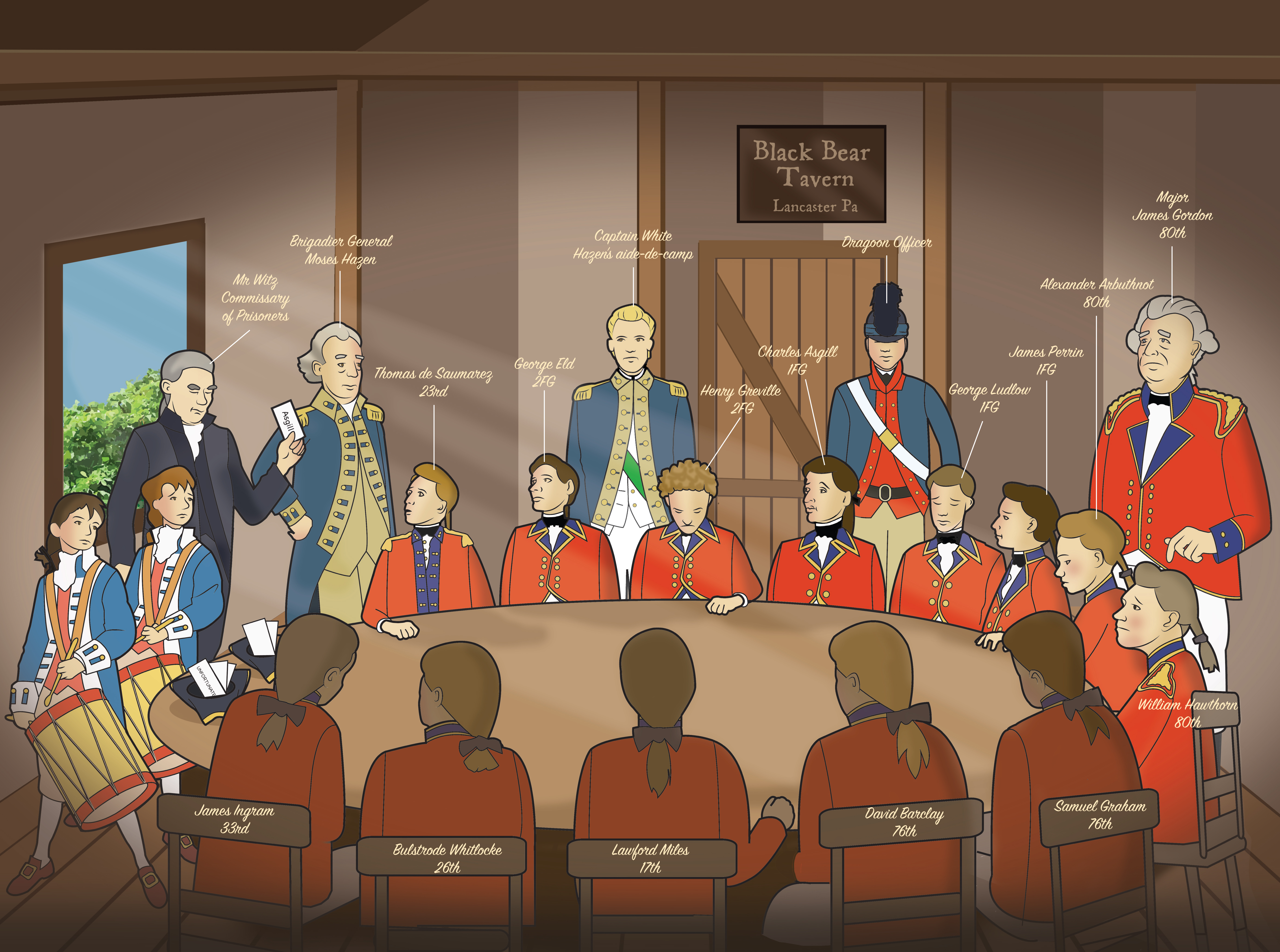
2022 depiction of the drawing of lots at the Black Bear Tavern, 27 May 1782

According to William M. Fowler, as soon as Washington had given the order to take a hostage, he realised that what he had done was morally suspect and likely illegal. While Congress endorsed Washington's actions, others disagreed and Alexander Hamilton considered them "repugnant, wanton and unnecessary". Historian Peter Henriques described it as a serious error of judgement - "Indeed the general's major error in judgment triggered the ensuing crisis."

Hazen, who had been in charge of the proceedings, wrote to Washington to inform him that as he had ordered, a young captain had been selected and was on his way to Philadelphia, accompanied by Major James Gordon, though Asgill stayed that night in Gordon's rooms and the pair did not depart until the following day. In the final paragraph of his letter, Hazen told Washington that Gordon had identified two possible unconditional prisoners, describing the potential replacements for Asgill as "of the Description which your Excellency wishes, and at first ordered". Hazen concluded: "It have [sic] fallen to my Lot to superintend this melancholy disagreeable Duty, I must confess I have been most sensible affected with it, and [do] most sincerely wish that the Information here given may operate in favour of Youth, Innocence, and Honour". There was money for the group’s expenses on the journey, and they had been given names of influential people in Philadelphia who might offer assistance. "It is reported that he even told the dragoons to follow all of Major Gordon's orders that did not affect the security of the prisoner". From Philadelphia, Asgill was sent on to Chatham, New Jersey. Asgill was initially held at the house of Elias Dayton, but subsequently at Timothy Day's Tavern.

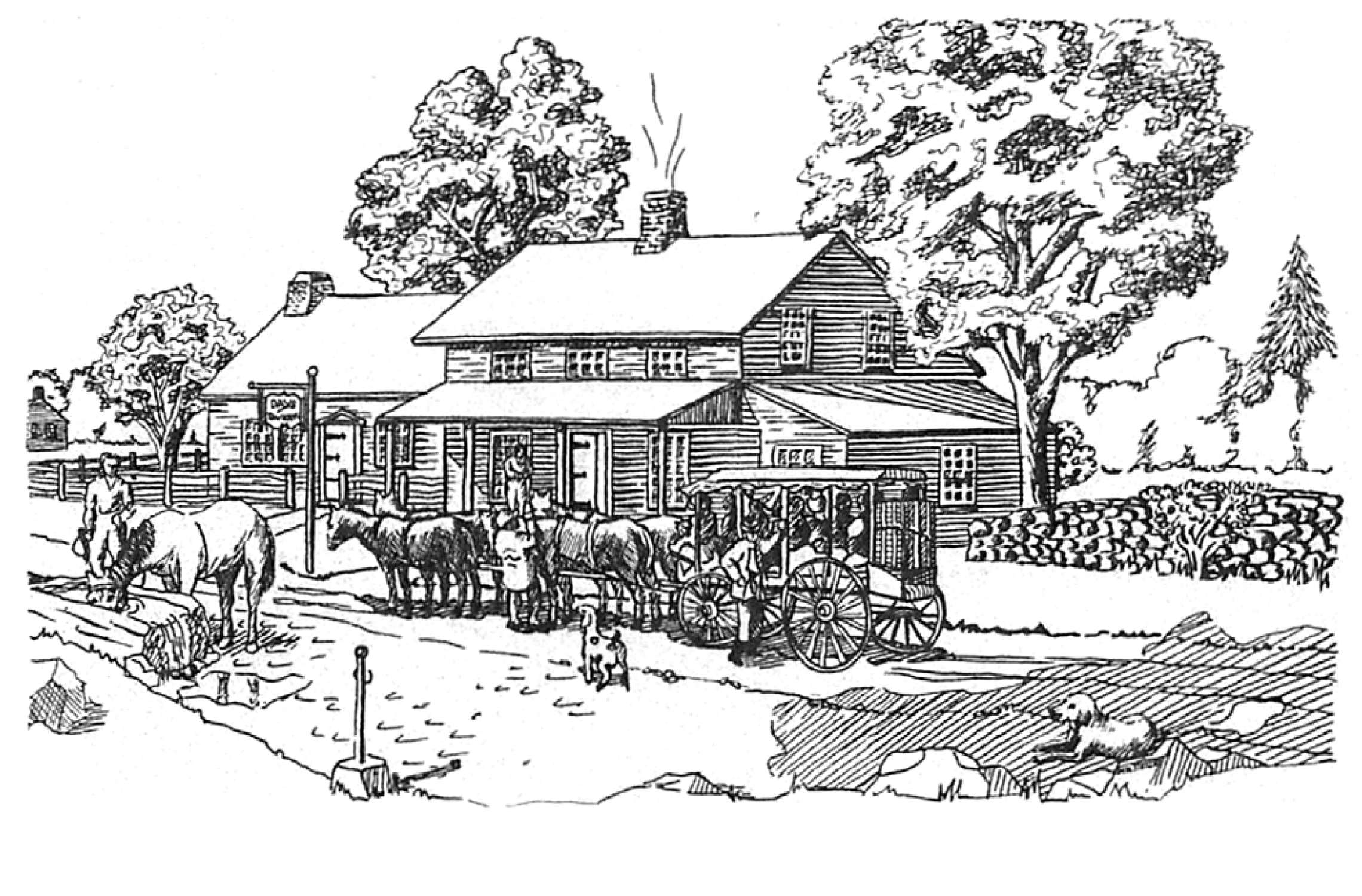
Timothy Day's Tavern, Chatham, NJ, the location of Asgill's imprisonment in 1782, 1967 drawing

Vanderpoel writes that Washington's "apparent willingness to sacrifice a capitulation prisoner in direct violation of a treaty which he himself had signed, (a willingness which English historians have declared to be the one blot upon the otherwise irreproachable character of the American hero), may be accounted for by the circumstances of the case, and his belief in the absolute necessity of retaliation; but it cannot be explained why, when he learned that the Americans had two British officers in their hands who were unconditional prisoners, he did not instantly stop all proceedings relating to Asgill, and insist that one of them should take his place".

According to T. Cole Jones, "When Washington received word of the selection, he immediately regretted it". Washington wrote to Benjamin Lincoln, admitting that "Colo. Hazen's sending an officer under the capitulation of York Town for the purpose of retaliation, has distressed me exceedingly". Cole explains Washington's quandary: "Executing Asgill would violate the treaty of capitulation and break his word to Cornwallis. On the other hand, 'if some person is not sacrificed to the Manes of poor Huddy', he thought that 'the whole business will have the appearance of a farce'".

According to A. G. Bradley, Sir Guy Carleton, 1st Baron Dorchester, Commander-in-Chief, North America, "sent the earliest remonstrances both to Washington, who truly replied that he was powerless, and to congress, who would be satisfied with nothing but the blood of either Lippincott or Asgill".

=== News reaches London ===
Lady Asgill, and her daughters, first heard the news of events in Chatham, when Captain Charles Gould, a friend of Asgill's, had been repatriated and went to call on them in Richmond. The news reached London "on or about the 13th of July."

Ministers in Whitehall, London, were becoming involved in the events taking place in America. On 10 July 1782, Sir Thomas Townshend, 1st Viscount Sydney, the British Home Secretary, wrote to Carleton, noting: "The News of that officer's being confined by Gen. Washington in direct contradiction to the Articles of Capitulation has struck every body [sic] with astonishment". Townshend wrote that "It is most probable that the current fate of this unfortunate affair will have been determined before this reaches you. But in case it should not, I can not help suggesting to your Excellency, that an application to M. de Rochambeau as a Party in the Capitulation seems to me a proper and necessary step" and that "M. de Rochambeau, and indeed Mr Washington too must expect that the execution of an officer under the circumstances of Captain Asgill must destroy all future confidence in Treatys [sic] & Capitulations of every kind, & introduce a kind of War that has ever been held in abhorrence among Civilized Nations".

On 14 August 1782, Townshend wrote to Carleton, noting that he had met King George III and that the king "cannot too highly approve of the very judicious Measure you have taken thereupon, and rests in full confidence that the footing on which it appears to have been placed by your Letter No 9 of the 17th of June, that Justice has taken its course, and that the perplexing affair has come to a final decision".

Four days later, on 18 August 1782, Carleton wrote to the Prime Minister Sir William Petty, 2nd Earl of Shelburne,: "The present Crisis I thought favourable, and I have accordingly written to General Washington and accompanyed [sic] my Letter with the Minister of the Court Martial, and such other Documents as I thought necessary for my Purposes and his Information; but what his Resolutions or those of Congress will be in this Matter I am Yet to learn."

=== King Louis XVl and Queen Marie Antoinette's role ===
On hearing of her son's impending execution, Asgill's mother, Sarah Theresa, Lady Asgill (who was of French Huguenot origin), wrote to the French court, pleading for her son's life to be spared. Arthur Dudley Pierce writes that "Enemies the monarchs of France and Britain might be, but their courts had a common stake in the preservation of privilege and a common distrust if not fear of those democratic forces which seemed to have been unleashed in America". King Louis XVI and Queen Marie Antoinette ordered the comte de Vergennes, the Foreign Minister, to convey to General Washington their desire that a young life be spared. Since France had also signed the Treaty of Capitulation, protecting prisoners of war from retaliation, they too were bound to honour the terms. Asgill was thus protected by the 14th Article of Capitulation in the document of Cornwallis's surrender, safeguarding prisoners of war. Vergennes writes to Washington on 29 July 1782:

There is one consideration, Sir, which, tho it is not decisive, may have an influence on your resolutions — Capt. Asgill is doubless [sic] your Prisoner, but he is among those whom the Arms of the King contributed to put into your hands at York Town Altho' this circumstance does not operate as a Safe Guard, it however justifies the interest I permit my self to take in this affair. If it is in your power Sir to consider & to have regard to it you will do what is agreeable to their Majesties

In her desperation, Lady Asgill sent a copy of Vergennes letter to Washington herself, by special courier, and her copies of correspondence reached Washington before the original from Paris. Washington forwarded the correspondence to the Continental Congress, where it arrived on the very day they were proposing to vote to hang Asgill. Previously, a majority of the delegates were for execution and "a motion [had been] made for a resolution positively ordering the immediate execution". The letter was read aloud before the delegates. After several days of debate, on 7 November, Congress passed an act releasing Asgill. Congress's solution was to offer Asgill's life as "a compliment to the King of France." However, Asgill did not receive his passport to leave imprisonment in Chatham, New Jersey, until 17 November 1782.

== Asgill's journey home ==
According to Ambrose Vanderpoel, Asgill left Chatham on 17 November, heading to New York with the intention of taking the first ship to sail for England. Mayo describes him as "riding for the British lines with Washington's passport in his pocket; riding, day and night, as hard as horse-flesh can bear it. And now, all breathless, all caked with the mire of the road, not pausing to make himself decent, he stands before Sir Guy Carleton".

Asgil had missed the packet boat Swallow, but was able to hire a small vessel, paying a crew to row it out to catch and allow him to board the Swallow. He reached England on 18 December.

Asgill persuaded the captain of the Swallow to accompany him to his parents' home, now known as Asgill House. Concerned that his parents would not have known whether he was dead or alive and about the impact the shock of his arrival might have on their health, Asgill asked the ship's captain to break the news by delivering them a letter informing them that he was alive and waiting to see them. Asgill hid in the bulrushes at the end of the garden. Asgill's mother was convinced that the captain was delivering bad news, and refused to leave her sickbed to take receipt of the letter. According to Mayo, the ship's captain explained that he had recently seen her son and that the situation was less bad than she imagined, and Lady Asgill then ran down to greet him.

It was reported in The Reading Mercury on 30 December 1782 that Asgill was at the levée for the first time since his arrival back in London, and that while he was in relatively good health considering how he suffered in confinement, his legs were still swollen from the chains he had been loaded with.

== Aftermath ==
During the months of Asgill's confinement at Chatham his fate drew considerable international public attention, aroused in part through the efforts of Lady Asgill. Writer and diplomat Friedrich Melchior, Baron von Grimm recorded this interest in his memoirs, stating: "The public prints all over Europe resounded with the unhappy catastrophe... [Asgill's fate] interested every feeling mind... and the first question asked of all vessels that arrived from any port in North America, was always an inquiry into the fate of that young man. Does Asgill still live?"

Lurid accounts of Asgill's experiences while imprisoned continued to circulate in the coffee houses and the press following his return to England, and French plays were written about the affair. Word reached Washington that Asgill had been complaining about the hardships he faced in New Jersey. Peter Henriques writes that "Tench Tilghman Sr., whose son had been an aide to Washington, told the general in 1786 that among other allegations Asgill apparently was telling people his captors had erected a gibbet outside his prison window as a taunt, that Washington countenanced such abusive behavior, and that only Rochambeau's intervention had saved his life".

Washington was angered that the young man did not deny these rumours, nor did he write to thank Washington for his release on parole. Henriques argues: "George Washington was notoriously thin-skinned, especially on matters involving personal honor. The general angrily responded that Asgill's statements were baseless calumnies. He described in considerable detail a generous parole he had extended Asgill and Gordon, forgetting that earlier he had tightly limited Asgill's movements. Calling his former captive 'defecting in politeness', he observed that Asgill, upon being repatriated, had lacked the grace to write and thank him". Later, Asgill would write that, at the time of his release, he "could not with sincerity return thanks," nor was he able "to give vent to reproaches."

In response to what Tilghman reported, Washington ordered that his correspondence on the Asgill Affair be made public. Colonel David Humphreys, Washington's aide-de-camp, gathered correspondence in support of him and created an article to send to Josiah Meigs and Eleutheros Dana, publishers of The New Haven Gazette and the Connecticut Magazine, where they were published on 16 November 1786. These letters excluded Washington's letter written to General Hazen on 18 May 1782, ordering him to include conditional prisoners in the selection of lots, in which he had violated the 14th Article of Capitulation. The only letter from Asgill included in Washington's account published in The New Haven Gazette and Connecticut Magazine was his letter of 17 June 1782, in which he expressed his gratitude for the treatment he had received in Chatham, but this was printed with the date of 17 May (which was before lots were drawn). When writing it, Asgill was only just three weeks into his confinement.

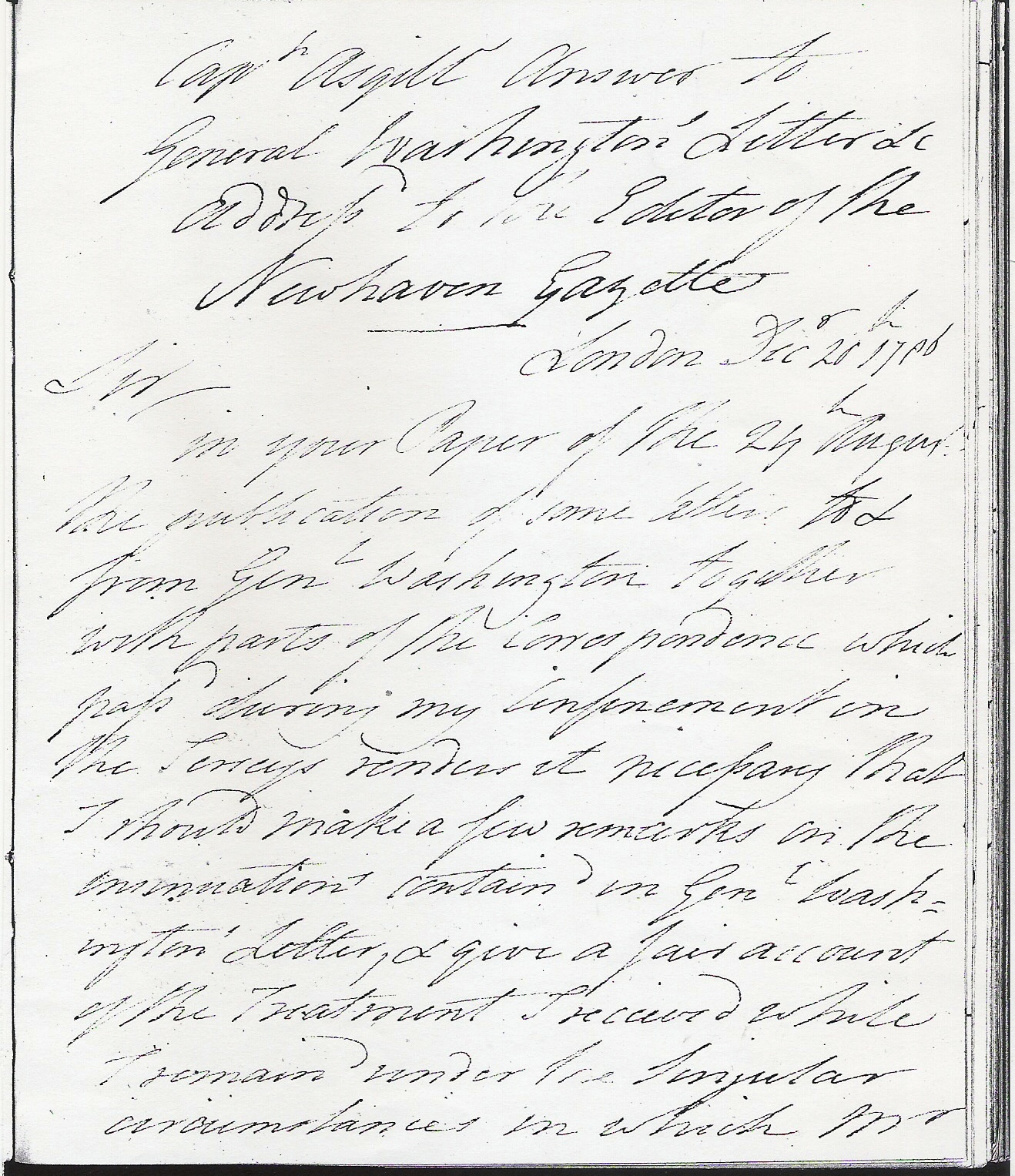
Captain Charles Asgill's letter to the Editor of the Newhaven Gazette, dated 20 December 1786

Asgill read Washington's account five weeks later, from London. He wrote an impassioned response to the editor of the New-Haven Gazette and the Connecticut Magazine, giving a detailed account of his mistreatment while he was awaiting execution and denying that he was ever taken to the gallows, but the letter was not published. In the letter, Asgill wrote:

Cap^{t} Asgill^{s} Answer to General Washington^{s} Letter &c Address^{d} to the Editor of the Newhaven Gazette

London Dec^{r} 20th 1786. Sir

In your Paper of the 24th August [Asgill made an error with the publication date; it should have read "of the 16th November"] the publication of some letters to & from Gen^{l} Washington together with parts of the Correspondence which pass^{d} during my Confinement in the Jerseys renders it necessary that I should make a few remarks on the insinuations contain^{d} in Gen^{l} Washington^{s} Letter, & give a fair account of the Treatment I received while I remain^{d} under the Singular circumstances in which Mr Washington^{s} judgment & feelings thought it justifiable & necessary to place [me] — the extreme regret with which I find myself oblg^{d} to call the attention of the publick [sic] to a subject which so peculiary [sic] if not exclusively concerns my own Character & private feelings will induce me to confine what I have to say within as narrow a Compass as possible—

In this letter Asgill also wrote: "I have ever attributed the delay of my execution to the humane, considerate & judicious conduct of S^{r} Guy Carleton, who amus^{d} Gen^{l} Washington with hopes & sooth^{d} him with the Idea that he might obtain the more immediate object of retaliation & Vengeance this Conduct of Sr Guy produced the procrastination which enabled the French Court particularly Her Majesty to exercise the characteristic humanity of that great & polish^{d} nation ..."

Asgill's unpublished letter was finally published in 2019, when a copy appeared in an issue of The Journal of Lancaster County’s Historical Society dedicated to the Asgill Affair.

== Impact on Paris peace talks ==
Historian John A. Haymond notes that some commentators on the Asgill Affair "feared the legal controversy might derail the slow steps toward a peaceful resolution to the conflict that were already underway". Haymond notes that the British prime minister, Frederick North, Lord North, "in a secret dispatch to Carleton, wrote of his concern that the matter 'not provide an obstacle in the way of accommodation'". Holger Hoock, however, attributes this quote to a letter to Carleton not from North but from William Petty, 2nd Earl of Shelburne, who became prime minister in July 1782. After defeat at Yorktown in October 1781, North had remained as prime minister in the hope of being allowed to negotiate peace in the American Revolutionary War, but following a House of Commons motion demanding an end to the war, he resigned on 20 March 1782. Peace negotiations leading to the Treaty of Paris, which eventually brought to an end the war, started in April 1782. American statesmen Benjamin Franklin, John Adams and John Jay negotiated the peace treaty with British representatives. On 12 April 1782, the day Huddy was hanged by order of William Franklin, his father Benjamin was in Paris, where he was holding preliminary negotiations with a British official, and the hanging "was to have international repercussions and threaten the peace talks".

The preliminary articles of peace were signed on 30 November 1782 and the Treaty of Paris itself, which formally ended the war, was signed on 3 September 1783. The Continental Congress ratified the Treaty on 14 January 1784. In a letter to Robert R. Livingston in January 1783, John Adams wrote: "The release of Captain Asgyll [sic] was so exquisite a Relief to my feelings, that I have not much cared what Interposition it was owing to— It would have been an [sic] horrid damp to the joys of Peace, if we had heard a disagreable [sic] account of him".

== The Asgill family visit to Paris ==
In November 1783, Asgill together with his mother (who had been too ill to travel sooner) and his two eldest sisters, went to France to thank the King and Queen for saving his life. Asgill wrote in his Service Records: "The unfortunate Lot fell on me and I was in consequence conveyed to the Jerseys where I remained in Prison enduring peculiar Hardships for Six Months until released by an Act of Congress at the intercession of the Court of France".

== In literature ==
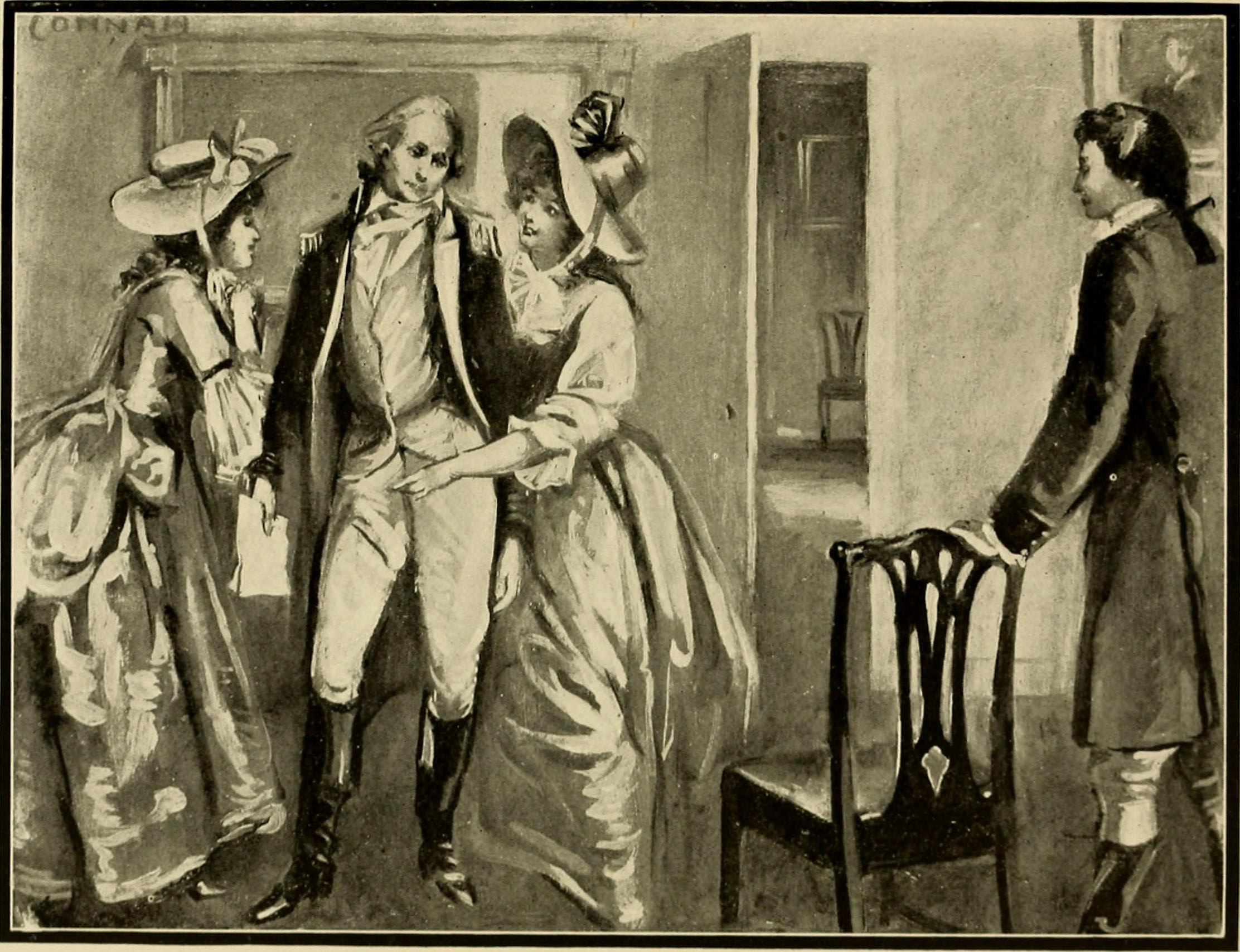
Asgill depicted in Two Girls of Old New Jersey: A School-Girl Story of '76, (1912) written by Agnes Carr Sage and illustrated by Douglas John Connah. The image's caption reads "'Clemency! For the British prisoner, your Excellency!'"

A historical novel written by Agnes Carr Sage, Two Girls of Old New Jersey: A School-Girl Story of '76, was published in 1912. It follows the events of 1782, and Asgill's impending execution. This fictionalised account introduces Asgill as a romantic hero who becomes engaged to be married to a Loyalist schoolteacher, Madeline Burnham, in Trenton, New Jersey.

French author Charles-Joseph Mayer's 1784 novel, (French: Asgill, ou les désordres des guerres civiles, lit. 'Asgill, or the Disorder of Civil Wars', also tells the story of 1782. Scholar Kristin Cook cites analysis of Mayer's book as an example of the critical attention the Asgill Affair has received, noting that "literary scholar Jack Iverson...reads the political impasse of its exposition as initially translated through two editions of Charles Joseph Mayer's 1784 French novel, Asgill, ou les désordres des guerres civiles...situating the American Affair, in relation to its French reception, as something of a dramatic Pièce de Théâtre. By introducing it as a reality-based plot that slides readily from fact into fiction, he illustrates a growing interest in the complex interconnections between 'real life' and 'imaginary conceit' among those affiliated with late eighteenth-century French print culture".

== The Asgill Affair in drama ==
- D'Aubigny, (1815) Washington or the Orphan of Pennsylvania, melodrama in three acts by one of the authors of The Thieving Magpie, with music and ballet, shown for the first time, at Paris, in the Ambigu-Comique theatre, 13 July 1815.
- J.-L. le Barbier-le-Jeune, (1785) Asgill.: Drama in five acts, prose, dedicated to Lady Asgill, published in London and Paris. According to Kenneth McKee, Asgill "was devoted almost entirely to a display of American gratitude for French intervention". The author shows Washington plagued by the cruel need for reprisal that his duty requires. Washington even takes Asgill in his arms and they embrace with enthusiasm. Lady Asgill was very impressed by the play, and, indeed, Washington himself wrote to thank the author for writing such a complimentary piece, although confessed that his French was not up to being able to read it. A copy of this play is available on the Gallica website.
- Billardon de Sauvigny, Louis-Edme, (1785) Dramatization of the Asgill Affair, thinly reset as Abdir Study of critical biography. Paris.
- De Comberousse, Benoit Michel (1795) Asgill, or the English Prisoner, a drama in five acts and verse. Comberousse, a member of the College of Arts, wrote this play in 1795. The drama, in which Washington's son plays a ridiculous role, was not performed in any theatre.
- de Lacoste, Henri, (1813) Washington, Or The Reprisal. A factual Drama, a play in three acts, in prose, staged for the first time in Paris at the Théâtre de l'Impératrice, on 5 January 1813. Henri de Lacoste was a Member of the Légion d'Honneur and l'Ordre impérial de la Réunion. In this play Asgill falls in love with Betti Penn, the daughter of a Pennsylvanian Quaker, who supports him through his ordeal awaiting death. The real William Penn (1644 – 1718) was an English writer and religious thinker belonging to the Religious Society of Friends (Quakers), and founder of the Province of Pennsylvania, a North American colony of England.
- Lambe, John Lawrence, (1911) Experiments in Play Writing, in Verse and Prose, first published by Sir Isaac Pitman & Sons, London, Bath and New York, which is a collection of plays, one of which is An English Gentleman, the story of the Asgill Affair retold (the 'English Gentleman' being George Washington). In this play Asgill declares his love for Virginia Huddy (the daughter of Captain Joshua Huddy, whose murder eventually leads to Asgill's own impending execution). The play ends with Washington's blessing on this union, when he says "Captain Asgill, it rejoices me that an unfortunate incident has terminated thus happily. (Taking his hand) May your union with this young lady symbolise the affection which I trust will ever unite the old country and the new. Sir, it has been your great happiness to win the best fortune of all, what is most adorable on earth – the love of a good and faithful woman".
- De Vivetieres, Marsollier (1793) music by Dalayrac, Asgill or The Prisoner of war – one act melodrama and prose, performed at the Opera-Comique for the first time on Thursday, 2 May 1793.

== In retrospect ==
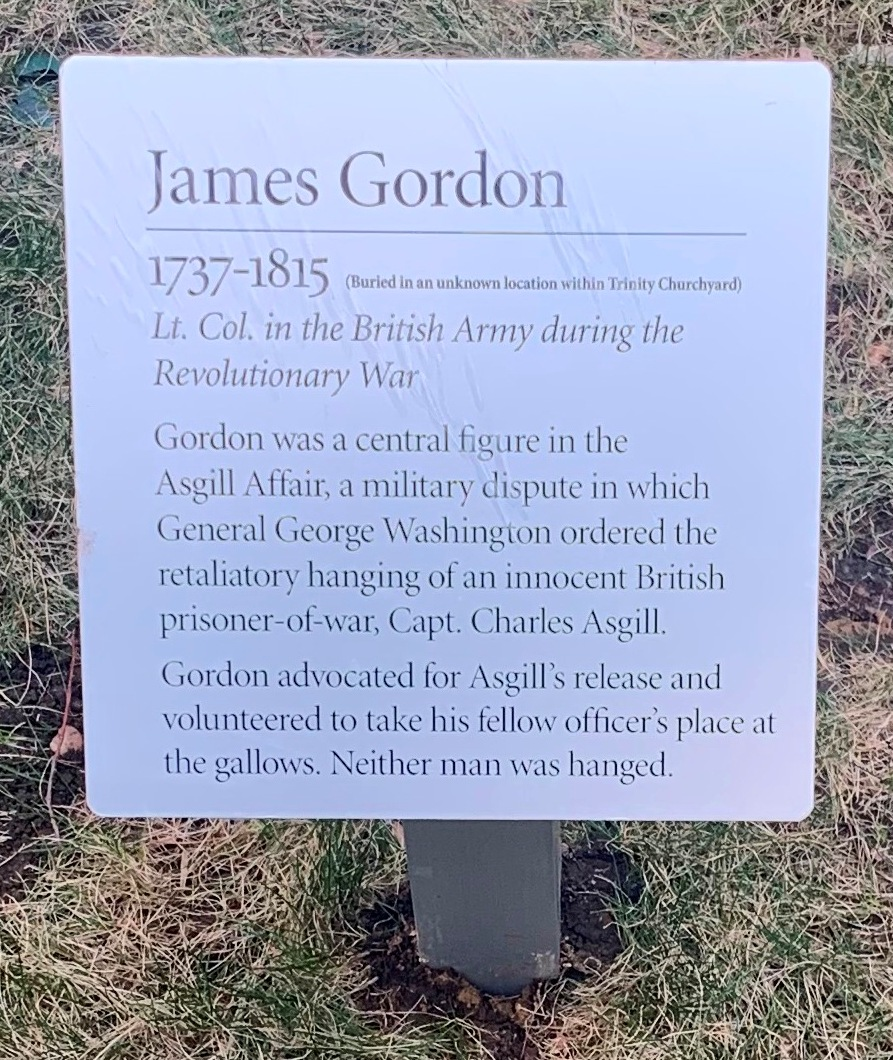
A memorial stanchion for Lieutenant Colonel James Gordon, erected at Trinity Church, New York

On 12 April 1982, a bicentennial commemorative cover for the Huddy-Asgill affair was produced.

Historian Louis Masur argues that the Huddy-Asgill affair, in particular, "injected the issue of the death penalty into public discourse" and increased American discomfort with it.

In his review of General Washington's Dilemma by Katherine Mayo, entitled "Only one hero – Major James Gordon", Keith Feiling writes that Mayo's book is, in some ways, a novel and as such deserves a hero. He maintains that the hero is neither Washington, Asgill, or Huddy, but rather James Gordon. A memorial stanchion for Gordon stands at Trinity Church, New York, mentioning his advocacy for Asgill's release.

== Bibliography ==
- Chernow, Ron (2010). Washington: A Life. New York: Penguin Press. ISBN 9781594202667.
- Henriques, Peter R. (2020). First and Always: A New Portrait of George Washington. Charlottesville: University of Virginia Press. ISBN 9780813944807.
- Mayo, Katherine (1938). General Washington's Dilemma. New York: Harcourt, Brace and Company. hdl:2027/uc1.$b61195.
- Vanderpoel, Ambrose (1921). History of Chatham New Jersey. Charles Francis Press – via archive.org.
