= James Gordon (British Army officer, died 1783) =

- Born: c. 1735; Ellon, Aberdeenshire, Scotland, Kingdom of Great Britain
- Died: 17 October 1783 (aged 48); Upper Manhattan, New York, United States
- Relatives: Father: James Gordon second Laird of Ellon (died April 1749); Mother: Elizabeth Gordon (née Glen) (1712–1792); Brother: Lieutenant-General Andrew Gordon (died 1806); Nephew: Lieutenant-General Robert Balfour, 6th of Balbirnie (1772–1837)
- Military career
- Allegiance: Great Britain
- Branch: British Army
- Rank: Lieutenant-Colonel
- Conflicts: American Revolutionary War

Lieutenant-Colonel James Gordon, the third and last Laird of the barony of Ellon, (c. 1735 – 17 October 1783) was a highly regarded British Army officer who fought in the American Revolutionary War. In 1782, he played a role in the Asgill Affair, the controversial confinement and proposed execution of British Captain Charles Asgill.

== Early life ==
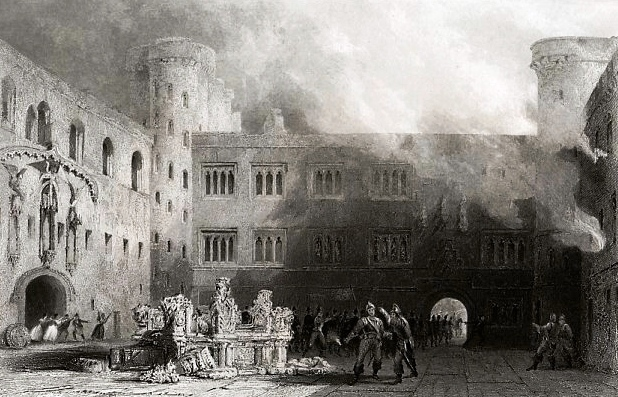
An 1839 engraving showing Elizabeth Gordon chastising the troops fleeing Linlithgow Palace.

James Gordon was born in Ellon, Aberdeenshire, Scotland, c.1735. His father was James Gordon, the second Laird of the barony of Ellon (died April 1749). His mother was Elizabeth Glen (1712–1792), daughter of Alexander Glen and sister of James Glen (1701–1777), Governor of South Carolina and keeper of the Palace of Linlithgow.

The Gordon family lived at Linlithgow Palace. On 1 February 1746, government troops, under the command of Lieutenant General Henry Hawley, were pursuing Jacobites in the area, and they left their overnight camp in the palace, rushing out leaving their campfires burning. The 320-year-old structure was badly damaged.

On 4 September 1747, the elder Gordon executed a deed (registered 23 March 1732) empowering his spouse, conjoined with others, to have full charge of his lands or to dispose of them. He died, according to his will, in April 1749. His inventory was given up by his widow, Elizabeth Glen.

Upon death of his father, Gordon inherited the barony. He did not keep Ellon long, for the lands were offered for sale on 8 April 1752. The articles of roup, in the Ellon Charter Chest, show that the upset price was £16,000 sterling, and in addition there is a stipulation that there shall be a present of 200 guineas for a gown to the said Elizabeth Glen. After a protracted competition, the lands were bought for George Gordon, 3rd Earl of Aberdeen in 1752, at £17,600, plus 200 guineas for the gown. There was an annuity of £120 to Elizabeth Glen reserved from the price".

That same year, 1752, Gordon petitioned for a writership (administrator) in the Honourable East India Company.

== Military career ==
Gordon initially served as an officer in the 115th Regiment of Foot (Royal Scotch Lowlanders) which were raised at Paisley in 1761, and disbanded in 1763, when he was placed on half pay. He was appointed major in the 80th Regiment of Foot (Royal Edinburgh Volunteers) on 16 December 1777 and accompanied the regiment on active service during the American Revolutionary War in August 1779. Gordon fought under General Charles Cornwallis, but became an American prisoner of war following capitulation after the siege of Yorktown, Virginia, in October 1781. "His soldiership during the war," writes Katherine Mayo, "earned him Cornwallis' praise – coupled once with an aside: 'When I first knew Gordon, twenty years ago, gay in gay London, who could have guessed how much lay in the man?'"

In May 1782, 13 captains under Gordon's command were compelled to draw lots to determine which one should be executed in retaliation for the earlier execution of patriot captain Joshua Huddy on orders from William Franklin, the former Royal governor of New Jersey. Charles Asgill drew the paper marked unfortunate and was put under a sentence of death. Due in large part to intervention by the French government, Asgill was released to return to England in November 1782.

== Death and legacy ==
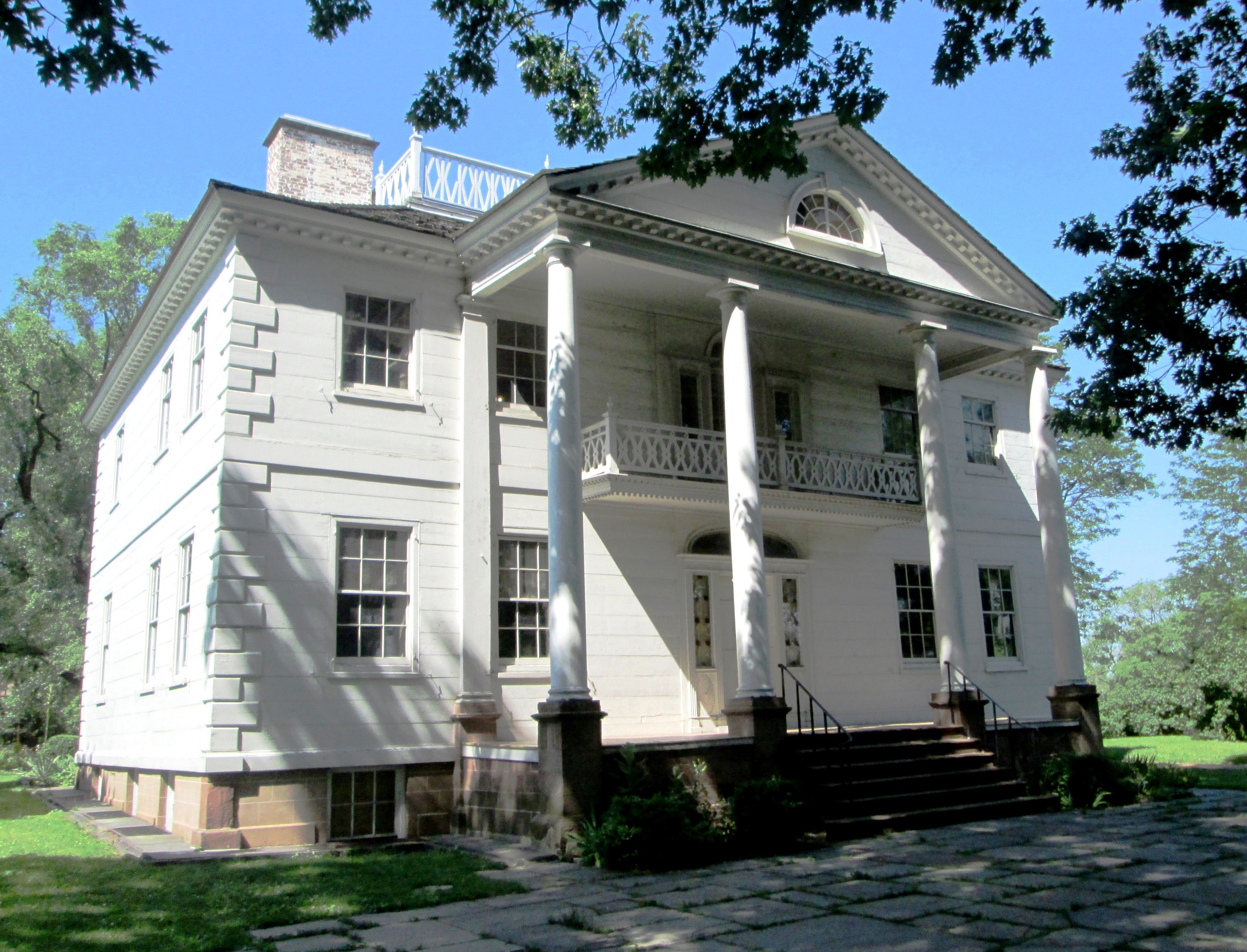
The Morris House which served as the headquarters of both the American and the British Forces during the War and in which Gordon died

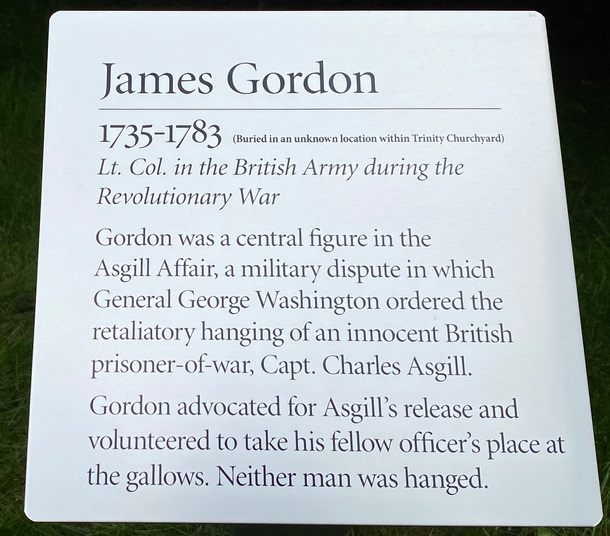
Lt. Col. James Gordon memorial stanchion

Gordon died of dropsy on 17 October 1783 at the Morris House in Kingsbridge, Upper Manhattan.

On his deathbed he was visited by Captain Samuel Graham who had served with him throughout the Revolutionary war. In his memoir, Graham stated that Gordon handed him a letter he had received from Lady Asgill (Charles Asgill's mother) in which she expresses her deepest gratitude for all that Gordon had done for her son. Another source confirms the existence of the letter, but states that it did not reach New York before Gordon died.

He was given a military funeral and was buried in an unmarked grave at Trinity Church Cemetery. At the time of his burial, Bishop Charles Inglis was the Rector of Trinity Church. On 8 March 2022, Trinity Church erected a memorial stanchion in Gordon's honour.

Following Gordon's death, Charles Asgill wrote:

… These were the attentions I received from General Washington ― I had however a comfort beyond his reach ― totally above his power to invade it was the Pride, the Consolation & Support which I derived from the exalted Friendship & Kind Compassion of Major Gordon of the 80th Regt who feeling for the distresses of a Brother Officer, [entrusted] by the best of Hearts in the cause of humanity & unwilling to leave a Youth of eighteen unadvised & unsupported to act in so peculiar & difficult a situation, sacrificed every Comfort to partake my hardships & Confinement & by the impulse of his excellent & noble Heart, felt on the [first] acquaintance all the steady & persevering Zeal that the longest & most tried Friendship could hope for or Claim he was there the whole of this transaction the partaker of my hardships the support of my Spirits, & the monitor of my conduct I am delighted at having the opportunity of proclaiming to the World his generous & benevolent attentions Tho whilst I do justice to his Memory I aggravate the sensations of regret, which I must ever retain, for the loss of him.

Gordon, who strenuously advocated on Asgill's behalf during the ordeal, suffered greatly from it. Ambrose Vanderpoel writes: "He took Asgill's misfortune keenly to heart, and his health, which previously had been somewhat delicate, was permanently impaired by the anxieties of the summer."
