= Huddy (surname) =

Huddy is a surname. Notable people with the surname include:

- Charlie Huddy (born 1959), Canadian ice hockey player and coach
- Jay Kristopher Huddy (born 1976), American artist, filmmaker, and video game designer
- Joshua Huddy (1735–1782), American captain
- Juliet Huddy (born 1969), American talk show host and radio broadcaster
- Leonie Huddy, Australian political scientist
- Ryan Huddy (born 1983), Canadian ice hockey player
- Xenophon Huddy (1876–1943), American lawyer
