= Asgill baronets =

British hereditary title

Escutcheon of the Asgill baronets of London

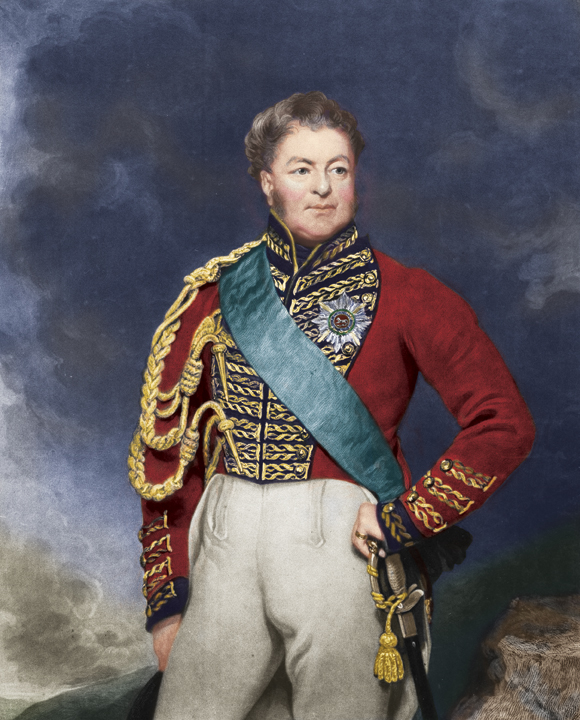
Sir Charles Asgill, 2nd Baronet

The Asgill Baronetcy, of London, was a title in the Baronetage of Great Britain. It was created on 17 April 1761 for Charles Asgill, a merchant banker and Lord Mayor of London between 1757 and 1758. The 2nd Baronet was a general in the British Army. The title became extinct on his death in 1823.

== Asgill baronets, of London (1761) ==
- Sir Charles Asgill, 1st Baronet (1713–1788)
- Sir Charles Asgill, 2nd Baronet (1762–1823)

Baronetage of Great Britain
Preceded by Watson baronets	Asgill baronets of London; 16 April 1761	Succeeded by Hesketh baronets
