= Watson baronets of Fulmer (1760) =

Watson baronets
- Escutcheon of the Watson baronets of Fulmer
- Creation date: 1760
- Status: extinct
- Extinction date: 1904
- Motto: Esto quod esse videris (Be what thou seemest to be)
- Arms: Argent, on a chevron engrailed Azure, between three martlets Sable as many crescents Or.
- Crest: A griffin's head erased Argent, ducally gorged Or

The Watson baronetcy, of Fulmer in the County of Buckingham, was created in the Baronetage of Great Britain on 22 March 1760 for Charles Watson (1751–1844), son of Admiral Sir Charles Watson (1714–1757). He was created a baronet by George II, 22 March 1760, at the age of 8 years, for the services of his father Admiral Watson, who died at Calcutta, 16 August 1757, aged 43, in command of naval forces in the East Indies.

The 1st Baronet inherited via his mother the lordship of the Devon manor of Combe Martin, which he sold before 1810.

The title became extinct on the death of the 4th Baronet in 1904.

== Watson baronets, of Fulmer (1760) ==
- Sir Charles Watson, 1st Baronet (1751–1844) The monumental inscription above his grave in the Parish Church of St Andrew's West Wratting, Cambridgeshire, reads: "To the memory of Sir Charles Watson, Bart. (whose remains are deposited in a vault beneath) Born at Bradfield, Berkshire, May 29th. O.S. or June 9th. N.S. 1751; died at Wratting Park, in this parish, August 26th. 1844."
- Sir Charles Wager Watson, 2nd Baronet (1800–1852)
- Sir Charles Watson, 3rd Baronet (1828–1888), from 1887 Watson-Copley
- Sir Walter Joseph Watson, 4th Baronet (1836–1904)

== Extended family ==
- Robert Godfrey Wolesley Bewicke-Copley, soi-disant 5th Baron Cromwell jure uxoris (1886–1923), was the son of Selina Frances Bewicke-Copley, daughter of the 3rd Baronet, one of the co-heirs of the title of Baron Cromwell, abeyant since 1497. The title was called out of abeyance in 1922 by the House of Lords in 1922, when Selina Bewicke-Copley was named a co-heir.

== Gallery ==
Watson-Copley arms

Bewicke-Copley arms

== Notes ==
Baronetage of Great Britain
Preceded by Fludyer baronets	Watson baronets of Fulmer; 22 March 1760	Succeeded by Asgill baronets
