= Colts Neck Inn =

Steakhouse in New Jersey, U.S.

- Colts Neck Inn Steakhouse at the intersection of Route 34 and County Route 537
- Interactive map of Colts Neck Inn

Restaurant information
- Established: 1717
- Owners: Mavrookas family (George Mavrookas, third generation)
- Previous owners: Lou Mavrookas (1973–2018); Ruffalo brothers (mid-1960s–1973)
- Food type: Steakhouse
- Location: 191 County Road 537, Colts Neck Township, Monmouth County, New Jersey, 07722, United States
- Coordinates: 40.2874°N 74.1756°W
- Seating capacity: ~150 (restaurant)
- Reservations: Recommended
- Other information: Historic tavern and stagecoach stop (est. 1717); adjacent
- Website: coltsneckinnsteakhouse.com

Colts Neck Inn is a historic steakhouse restaurant and an adjacent boutique hotel located at the intersection of Route 34 and County Route 537 in Colts Neck Township, Monmouth County, New Jersey. The restaurant, often referred to as the Colts Neck Inn Steakhouse, occupies a site that has hosted an inn or tavern since the early 18th century and is frequently cited as the oldest inn in New Jersey (established c. 1717) and among the oldest in the United States. Originally a colonial-era tavern and stagecoach stop, it evolved into a hotel in the 19th and 20th centuries before refocusing as a steakhouse. A separate lodging facility, the Colts Neck Inn Hotel, was built adjacent to the restaurant in 1997 to continue the inn’s hospitality tradition with modern amenities. Both the restaurant and hotel have been owned and operated by the Mavrookas family since 1973, spanning three generations as of the mid-2020s.

== History ==
=== Colonial era and 19th century ===
Local tradition holds that a tavern was first established on the site around 1717, when it was known as the Colts Neck Tavern. Due to a lack of surviving records, the exact founding date is unverified, but the inn publicly claims the 1717 origin on its signage. During the colonial period, the tavern served as a stopover for stagecoaches along the Burlington Path – an early roadway spanning from the Atlantic Coast to the Delaware River. By about 1735, the tavern was operated by Levi Hart, a Jewish immigrant from England. Hart's presence was notable enough that British military maps from the Revolutionary War labeled the Colts Neck area as Jewstown, in reference to his tavern. After Levi Hart's death in 1775, his widow Catherine Hart (née Applegate) inherited the establishment. Catherine remarried in 1778 to Captain Joshua Huddy, a patriot militia officer in the American Revolution, and for a time Huddy helped operate the tavern. A long-held local legend suggests that George Washington was once a guest at the tavern during the Revolutionary War era, although this remains unproven lore. Huddy's tenure was tumultuous, and he was frequently entangled in legal disputes, including accusations of trying to seize ownership of the tavern from his wife and evict her children. Contemporary records show that Monmouth County Sheriff Nicholas Van Brunt intervened in 1779, requiring Huddy to agree not to sell Catherine's property or dispossess her children. Huddy's involvement with the inn ended amid these disputes, and he gained renown soon after as a war hero and martyr when captured and executed by Loyalists in 1782.

Following the Revolutionary War, Jacob Hart (the son of Levi and Catherine) took over the Colts Neck tavern and ran it until 1817. In 1817, proprietorship passed to Samuel Laird. Under Laird's stewardship, the inn continued to be an important social center. Notably, Samuel Laird also established a horse-training operation on the property. He trained racehorses and his son, Joseph T. Laird, became one of the premier jockeys on the East Coast. One of their horses, a mare named Fashion, achieved national fame by winning a prominent match race in 1842 at the Union Course on Long Island. Samuel Laird served as Colts Neck's first postmaster when a local post office opened in 1824, and he continued as innkeeper until his death in 1859. The Laird family's impact extended beyond the inn itself – Samuel's father, Robert Laird, had in 1780 founded Laird & Company next door to the tavern. Laird & Company's distillery produced applejack (apple brandy) and is recognized as the oldest licensed distillery in the United States. The original Colts Neck distillery operated until it was destroyed by a fire in 1849, after which the Lairds rebuilt their distilling operations in nearby Scobeyville.

After Samuel Laird's death, his son Robert S. Laird managed the Colts Neck inn until 1869. In the late 19th century, ownership of the inn changed hands several times. By 1885, records show the inn was run by Monroe Matthews, following proprietors such as Augustus Manning and others whose names are less documented. Throughout this period, the establishment was commonly referred to as the Colts Neck Hotel as well as an inn or tavern, reflecting its offering of lodging in addition to food and drink.

=== 20th century ===
By the early 20th century, the Colts Neck Inn remained a prominent waypoint for travelers in Monmouth County. In December 1908, then-owner Frederick H. Luther sold the inn to Louis V. Snyder of Long Branch. At the time of this 1908 sale, the property included more than 25 guest rooms, stabling for 25 horses, and several acres of land. It was noted in news reports as "the only hotel between Eatontown and Freehold". Snyder took over operations in March 1909. By the mid-1960s, the business was co-owned by brothers Arthur and Joseph Ruffalo, who operated the Colts Neck Inn as a bar and restaurant.

In 1973, the Ruffalos sold the establishment to George Mavrookas, beginning the current family ownership era. George Mavrookas and his family revitalized the Colts Neck Inn and focused it on its restaurant trade, while still preserving its historic identity. Under Mavrookas ownership, the lodging functions of the old inn gradually diminished; the original building transitioned fully into a dining and banquet facility by the late 20th century. To continue offering accommodations, the family later pursued a separate hotel on the property (see Colts Neck Inn Hotel below). George Mavrookas, who had emigrated from Greece and was an experienced restaurateur, managed the inn for decades; he was also known for owning the Premium Diner in Woodbridge Township. After George Mavrookas died in 2018 at the age of 92, the Colts Neck Inn business remained in the family’s hands. His son Louis "Lou" Mavrookas and grandson (also named George Mavrookas) have continued the family legacy, with each generation actively involved in operations. The township of Colts Neck recognized the inn’s tricentennial milestone in December 2017: the Mayor and Committee issued a proclamation declaring "Colts Neck Inn Day" to celebrate the inn’s 300th anniversary, and the Mavrookas family hosted a public cocktail reception to commemorate the occasion.

=== 21st century ===
The Colts Neck Inn today operates primarily as a steakhouse restaurant, known for its rustic charm and classic American fare. The menu centers on hand-cut steaks and traditional chops, while also offering a variety of other dishes. The inn's steaks and prime rib have earned public accolades; readers of the Asbury Park Press voted the Colts Neck Inn "Best Steak House in Monmouth County" multiple times (including in 2015, 2016, and 2017) and also honored it for "Best Brunch" in the county. New Jersey Monthly magazine has likewise recognized the restaurant in its annual readers' choice rankings of New Jersey.

For most of the late 20th century and early 21st century, the establishment was branded as the "Colts Neck Inn Steak & Chop House". Live music and dancing have been a popular feature on weekend evenings, reinforcing the Colts Neck Inn's role as both a restaurant and local nightlife venue. By 2020, the third-generation management (led by George Mavrookas, grandson of the 1970s owner) sought to update the restaurant to appeal to contemporary diners while preserving its historic atmosphere.

==== Renovation (2024) ====
In mid-2024 the Colts Neck Inn Steakhouse temporarily closed its doors to undergo a comprehensive renovation – its first major overhaul in over two decades. The Mavrookas family spent approximately four months remodeling both the interior and exterior of the building. When the restaurant reopened in late 2024 (with a slightly updated name, simply "Colts Neck Inn Steakhouse"), patrons were greeted by a dramatically refreshed décor. The once "dark mahogany wood and burgundy-and-green" interiors were replaced with a modern design palette of grays, black, and gold, creating what management described as a "sexier, more modern look" for the dining rooms and bar. The renovation modernized all areas of the steakhouse – including the main dining hall, the bar and lounge, and the banquet/private event rooms – as well as furniture, place settings, and fixtures. The restaurant seats approximately 150 guests and retained its distinctive rustic building structure while introducing contemporary touches.

Since reopening, the rejuvenated Colts Neck Inn Steakhouse has been featured in local food media as a successful example of blending history with modern hospitality. Reviewers have noted that the restaurant "has been serving up history and hospitality since 1717, and now ... it's better than ever" after its facelift. The Mavrookas family has emphasized that throughout the updates, they aimed to "keep the charm alive" – preserving memorabilia and the sense of history within the building – even as they upgraded the ambiance and facilities for 21st-century patrons.

== Colts Neck Inn Hotel (1997–present) ==
In 1997, the Mavrookas family expanded the business by opening the Colts Neck Inn Hotel, a separate lodging facility built adjacent to the historic restaurant. (The hotel is located just west of the steakhouse, on the same property at Route 537.) This two-story boutique hotel was founded to carry on the inn-keeping aspect of the Colts Neck Inn’s legacy in a modern formcoltsneckinnhotel.com. According to the family, the hotel was a long-held dream of family patriarch George Mavrookas (“our papou”) as a venture that future generations could continuecoltsneckinnhotel.com. The Colts Neck Inn Hotel was incorporated as an entity distinct from the restaurant, although both are family-run and share the name and location.

The hotel offers 48 individually decorated rooms (as of 2025), including two larger “grand suites” each equipped with a jacuzzi tub. They provide amenities such as free Wi-Fi, cable television, complimentary continental breakfast, and on-site parking. Despite being a new construction in the late 1990s, the hotel’s exterior architecture and interior design were intended to complement the historic feel of the adjacent steakhouse.

The Mavrookas family notes that the hotel has emphasized personalized service and cleanliness as key to its operations. The family periodically updates the hotel to keep it up-to-date; in the early 2020s, the guest rooms and suites were renovated with new flooring and refreshed decor to maintain a high level of comfort for guests. The hotel does not have a full-service restaurant of its own; however, having the Colts Neck Inn Steakhouse and bar next door is a convenient feature for guests.
