= Xenophon Huddy =

American lawyer (1876–1943)

Xenophon Pearce Huddy (1876–1943) was an American lawyer, specializing in automobile law.

Huddy graduated from Yale University cum laude, and was admitted to the New York Bar on January 5, 1906, after which he became a senior partner in the law practice of MacHenry, Huddy & Cook with partners Charles Ainsworth MacHenry and Philip R. Cook at 309 Broadway, New York City. By 1906, he was a regular contributor to Horseless Age, and lectured before the Automobile Club of America, among others. In his legal practice, he was known for his opinions on automobile law, and argued pro-motorist cases in court. His 1906 book, The Law Of Automobiles, and writings are considered the first serious legal opinions on the philosophy of automobile law, and were important in informing later legal thinking.

He was a descendant of American Revolutionary War Capt. Joshua Huddy, and lectured on Revolutionary War topics. Evidence exists that he later became a judge.

Mrs. Xenophon Huddy testified before Congress on Prohibition.

== Selected bibliography ==
- Xenophon P. Huddy, LL.B. of the New York Bar (1906). The Law Of Automobiles. Albany, N. Y.: Matthew Bender and Co.
- Ajduk, Z. (1905). "Equity and Inequity of Corporate Taxation in the United States". Yale Law Journal. v. 14 - 1904-1905.
- "What a Lawyer Sees Amiss in the Bill". The Automobile. July 14, 1910.
