= Huddy Park =

Location in Highlands, New Jersey, USA

Coordinates: 39.95088°N 74.19774°W

Huddy Park is a location in Highlands, New Jersey. Dedicated to the patriot hero Joshua Huddy of the American Revolutionary War, who was hanged there in 1782, Huddy Park is the site of the local "Clamfest" since 1994.

This is not to be confused with the park of the same name located in downtown Toms River, New Jersey.
