= Edme-Louis Billardon de Sauvigny =

French playwright (1738–1812)

Edme-Louis Billardon de Sauvigny (born at sea near La Rochelle ca. 15 March 1738, baptised in that city and died in Paris 19 April 1812) was an 18th–19th-century French man of letters and playwright.

== Biography ==
Brother of Abbé Étienne-Louis Billardon de Sauvigny, he studied in Paris and embraced the career of arms probably followed by his father. A few pieces of verse having made him known in the society at a time when the witty minds were in favor, he was admitted in the bodyguards of Stanislas Leszczynski, King of Poland and Duke of Lorraine, but he was already no longer there in 1762, and returned to Paris, where he was the privileged poet of the comtesse du Barry.

Sauvigny had obtained a cavalry lieutenancy, and later the cross of the Order of St. Louis, but his pension and the meagre income from his dramatic works could not suffice for his existence, he worked for the booksellers, and published new productions almost every year. He owed to the protection of Louise Marie Adélaïde de Bourbon, duchess of Chartres, a royal censorship position in 1776.

In 1788, for having approved the publication of l'Almanach des honnêtes gens, by Sylvain Maréchal, he was exiled by a lettre de cachet 30 leagues from Paris, and threatened to remove from his place which the Revolution made him lose shortly afterwards. He adopted its principles with moderation and was attached, in 1789, with the title of Adjutant General, to the general staff of the national cavalry at the military academy, of which he had the provisional command in 1792. It was in this capacity that he wrote to the Paris Commune, to tell it about the disturbances caused in the Rue de Varenne on 4 November by a civic festival in which companies of this guard had taken part, against the federated Marseillais.

He was later appointed colonel of a regiment of veterans, and was not employed neither under the Consulate nor under the Empire, but he got a small job at the Ministry of the Interior. He was so forgotten in his later years that Palissot in 1803 did not know if he was still alive. The Biographie universelle by Michaud mistook him for his brother, and placed his death in 1809. Probably because of this omission, some biographers gave birth to him around 1730 in the diocese of Auxerre, others in 1734 in Paris or 1736 in La Rochelle.

We have verse compositions of him, as well as dramatic works, of which only la Mort de Socrate was successful. He was better off as a writer.

== Works ==
- 1756: Réflexions en vers sur l’héroïsme, Berlin, in-8°.
- 1756: Lettres philosophiques, par M. Sauvigny, gendarme, Bristol, chez les frères rimeurs, in-12°.
- 1756: L’Une et l’Autre, ou la Noblesse commerçante et militaire, avec des réflexions sur le commerce et les moyens de l’encourager, Mahon, Impr. française, aux dépens de W. Blakeney. Book published in the debates on the book of Father Coyer on trading nobility.
- 1757: La France vengée, poem, Paris, in-8°.
- 1758: La Prussiade, poëme nouveau en quatre chants, en vers comi-héroïques, Cassel, at the expenses of the author, in-8°.
- 1758: La Religion révélée, poëme en réponse à celui de la Religion naturelle, avec un poëme sur la cabale anti-anciclopédique, au sujet du dessein qu’ont eu les Encyclopédistes de discontinuer leurs travaux, par M. de S*******, Geneva, in-16. Book published in response to la Religion naturelle by Voltaire.
- 1759: Le Masque enchanté, farce en un acte et en vers, Geneva, in-8°.
- 1761: Voyage de Madame et de Mme Victoire, Lunéville, Messuy, s.d. in-8°.
- 1762: Odes anacréontiques, Paris, Jorry, in-16°.
- 1763: La Mort de Socrate, tragedy in 3 acts, Paris, Prault le jeune. Read online. The only one of his dramatic works to achieve success.
- 1764: Apologues orientaux dédiés à Mgr le Dauphin, Paris, Duchesne.
- 1765: Histoire amoureuse de Pierre le Long et de sa très-honorée dame Blanche Bazu, écrite par iceluy, London, in-12°. Reprinted with music by M. Philidor », London, then preceded by a Discours sur la langue françoise, London, 1768 - Paris, Ducauroy, an IV - Werdet and Lequien fils, 1819. New edition in-8° under the title: L’Innocence du premier âge en France, ou Histoire amoureuse de Pierre le Long et de Blanche Bazu, followed by La Rose ou La Fête de Salency and L’isle d’Ouessant, music by Monsigny, Paris, De Lalain, 1768, then preceded by an Essai sur les progrès de la langue française, Paris, Ruault, 1778.
- 1767: Hirza, Paris, veuve Duchesne. Tragedy created at the Théâtre Français 27 May. Reprinted in Geneva, printing press o P. Pellet and fils, 1768.
- 1770: La Rose, ou la Feste de Salency, avec un supplément sur l’origine de cette feste, Paris, Gauguery, in-8°.
- 1771: Le Persifleur, Paris, Delalain. Comedy in three acts and in verse created at the Théâtre Français 8 February.
- 1773: Parnasse des Dames, Paris, Ruault, in-8°.
- 1783: Gabrielle d’Estrées, Paris, Robustel, 1778. Tragedy in five acts created in Versailles 28 January. Reprint: Veuve Duchesne.
- 1780: A trompeur trompeur et demi, ou les Torts du sentiment, one-act comedy mingled with ariettes.
- 1782–1783: Les Après soupés de la société, petit théâtre lyrique et moral sur les aventures de la société, in Sybaris and Paris, the author, 24 cahiers in 6 vol. in-8°.
- 1783: Péronne sauvée, Paris, impr. de P. de Lormel. Opera in four acts, music by Dezède, created by the Académie royale de musique 17 May.
- 1785: Essais historiques sur les mœurs des François, ou Traduction abrégée des chroniques ou autres ouvrages des auteurs contemporains depuis Clovis jusqu’à Saint Louis, Paris, Gervais Clouzier, 2 vol. in-8°.
- 1786: Recueil de lettres écrites sous la première race de nos rois par des personnages considérables, rois, reines, grands de l’État, papes, évêques, etc. Pour servir de suite aux essais historiques sur les mœurs des François, Paris, Gervais Clouzier, in-8°. The first two volumes of the Essais historiques include the Vie de Grégoire de Tours, par lui-même, and L’Histoire de France de Grégoire de Tours et sa continuation par Fredegarius; the third contains translated letters from Recueil des historiens de Gaules et de la France by Dom Martin Bouquet, 8 vol. in-folio, 1738-1752; these three volumes, provided new title leaves, were put on sale in 1792 in Maillard Orivelle with two new volumes, containing a translation of a dozen ancient chronicles, including the Chronique de Saint Denis and the chronological and comparative analysis of 53 other chronic and 255 lives of Saints.
- 1785: Abdir. Drama in four acts on the American Revolution.
- 1790: Du théâtre sous les rapports de la nouvelle constitution, discours présenté à l’Assemblée nationale par M. de Sauvigny, Paris, impr. de Cussac, in-8°.
- 1791: Washington, ou la Liberté du nouveau monde, Paris, Maillard d’Orivelle, 1791. Tragedy in four acts created at the Théâtre de la Nation 13 July.
- Addresse lue à la Convention nationale par L.E. Billardon de Sauvigny en lui présentant le corps de la cavalerie nationale, Paris, impr. de Pougin, s.d., in-8°.
- 1792: Lettres de Rois, Reines, Grands, &c. Pour servir de suite aux essais historiques sur les mœurs des Français, Paris, Maillard d’Orivelle, 2 vol. in-8°.
- 1792: Œuvres de Sidonius Apollinaris, évêque de Clermont, Paris, Maillard d’Orivelle, 2 vol. in-8°.
- 1792: Constitutions des rois des Français, pour servir de suite aux essais historiques sur les mœurs des Français, Paris, Maillard d’Orivelle in-8°.
- 1792: Convention nationale. Speech prononouced 26 October [...] by citizen Edme Billardon-Sauvigny, au nom du corps de la cavalerie parisienne, Paris, Impr. nationale, s.d., in-8°.
- Discours prononcé par le citoyen Billardon-Sauvigny [...] à la Société populaire de Pau, le 18 pluviôse l’an III, Pau, impr. de Daumon et Foumin, s.d., in-8°.
- Pétition de L.E. Billardon-Sauvigny [...], pour la levée de la suspension de ses deux drames d’Aratus et de M. Pitt, 25 pluviôse an III, s.l.n.d., in-8°.
- Prestation du serment des vétérans militaires près le Conseil des Anciens. Billardon-Sauvigni [...] à ses frères d’armes, Paris, impr. de la citoyenne Balleu, s.d., in-4°.
- Recueil d’apologues et de faits historiques mis en vers, et relatifs aux Révolutions française, américaine [...], Paris, Laran, an V-1797, in-8°.
- Moralités historiques et allégoriques en vers, sur les événements les plus intéressans pour la nation française, Paris, impr. de Prault, an VIII, in-8°.
- 1806: Encyclopédie des dames, ouvrage destiné à l’instruction du beau sexe, Paris, Guyon, Maison et Gervais, 3 vol. in-12.

== Sources ==
- Biographie universelle, ancienne et moderne (in French). Vol. 17–18. Brussels: H. Ode. 1847. p. 303..
- Dictionnaire des journalistes (1600-1789)
