= Sir Charles Asgill, 1st Baronet =

Sir Charles Asgill Bt
- c. 1760 portrait of Asgill
- Born: 17 March 1714
- Died: 15 September 1788 (aged 74)
- Education: Westminster School
- Occupations: Banker and politician
- Political party: Whig
- Spouses: Hannah Vanderstegen; Sarah Theresa Pratviel
- Relatives: John Asgill, 1659–1738, (known as "Translated" Asgill) was a relative, both being descendants of Joshua Asgyll MA, DD

Sir Charles Asgill, 1st Baronet (17 March 1714 – 15 September 1788) was an English merchant and banker. The third son of the silk merchant Henry Asgill, he was educated at Westminster School.

== Asgill's Bank ==
Apprenticed to the banking house of William Pepys & Co. he later became a partner in the firm of Vere and Asgill, bankers of Lombard Street, in the City of London, in 1740. In the early 1700s private banks operated from private houses. The first purpose-built bank in London was Asgill's at 70 Lombard Street. Designed by Sir Robert Taylor in 1757, it set a pattern for later banking houses.

Asgill’s Bank traced its origins to the goldsmithing business of Glegg & Vere, formed in Lombard Street, London, in about 1730. When Glegg died, Joseph Vere took Charles Asgill into partnership and the firm was renamed Vere & Asgill in 1740. Vere left the partnership in 1753, when he became senior partner in the new bank of Vere, Glyn & Hallifax. The firm was known as Sir Charles Asgill, Nightingale & Wickenden in 1765; Asgill, Nightingale & Nightingale in 1775. It became John, William & George Nightingale in 1789, the year after Asgill’s death. In 1791 the name of John Nightingale disappeared from the firm, and the business was conducted by William and George Nightingale until 1796, when it became extinct, having probably suspended payment during the great panic. In 1797 the premises, at 70 Lombard Street, were acquired by Pelican and British Empire Life Insurance Company.

== Civic duties ==
Asgill was Alderman of Candlewick Ward (1749–1771) and was also Master of the Skinners Company (1749), a Governor of Bridewell Royal Hospital (1743–1750), where his friend, the banker Sir Richard Glyn, was President. Sheriff of the City of London (1753) and Lord Mayor of London (1757–1758).

Possibly with a view to Asgill’s noted disapproval of the war in America in mind, Patience Wright, a New York-born sculptor of wax figures in London, wrote, in a letter to Benjamin Franklin, sometime after 7 March 1777: "A letter to Sir Charl[e]s Asgall [sic] on the afairs [sic] of stocks, a Letter from The Emperor [of] Germany or Some truths Properly Stated to the alldmen [sic] in London And a Letter to Ld. Temple or G[e]orge Germain would at this time have a blessed good effect".

Asgill was created a Baronet on 17 April 1761

== Commissions given to Robert Taylor ==
In addition to the Lombard Street bank building, Robert Taylor designed Asgill House (on part of the former site of Richmond Palace) for Asgill as a weekend and holiday villa, his London residence being in Portman Square. Taylor also designed the Lord Mayor's State Coach, which was built for Asgill's mayoral inauguration in 1757, and is still used on the occasion of a coronation and once a year for the Lord Mayor's Show.

The Oxford Journal states that Asgill's Portman Square home: "sold...for 13,000l" in 1812 [£948,388 in 2021], and it had been "built by Sir Robert Taylor for Sir Charles Asgill, and, except the Richmond Villa for the same Sir Charles, was one of the prettiest he ever built." Asgill also occupied 15 St James's Square from 1768–73, which had been altered by Taylor for Peter du Cane. A 1930s building, which replaced this original home, was converted into office space and residential duplex apartments. The three duplexes created were named after the historic owners of this property: Timbrell, Asgill and Alban.

== Family life ==
Asgill married (1st) Hannah Vanderstegen on 16 June 1752, and, following her death in 1754, he married (2nd) Sarah Theresa Pratviel, on 12 December 1755.

Katherine Mayo states that "Asgill’s character showed the Westminster hallmark. A man of staunch intellectual honesty and breadth of mind, he was open of heart and hand wherever his sympathies were touched. In politics he was a militant Whig. His resentment of the attitude of King and Ministry towards the American Colonies amounted to a passion; and he refused a peerage offered him, it was said, in the hope of shifting his influence. In his marriage he was fortunate. Theresa Pratviel [known as Sarah] was the daughter of a wealthy French Huguenot émigré. Sparkling with energy and imagination and noted for her charm, she shared her husband's humanitarian and political ideas; and the two enjoyed as household friends some of the first Whig lights of the day— statesmen, publicists, men of letters".

== Death and legacy ==
Asgill died on 15 September 1788, and was buried at St Bartholomew-by-the-Exchange, London. His obituary in the Gentleman's Magazine stated that "he was a strong instance of what may be effected even by moderate abilities, when united with strict integrity, industry and irreproachable character." Asgill was succeeded by his only son Sir Charles Asgill, 2nd Baronet, a British Army officer. Asgill and his wife Sarah also had five daughters; only two, (Amelia Angelina Colvile and Caroline Augusta Legge) still living at the time of the death of his widow on 6 June 1816. She was a vocal advocate on behalf of her son while he was an American prisoner of war facing execution in 1782, during what became known as the Asgill Affair. The dance tune, "Asgill's Rant", was composed at the end of the British credit crisis of 1772–1773. Due to the fact that the British were forced to introduce controversial legislation for the colonies, in an attempt to remedy the crisis, this then became one of the causes of the American Revolutionary War.

== Gallery ==
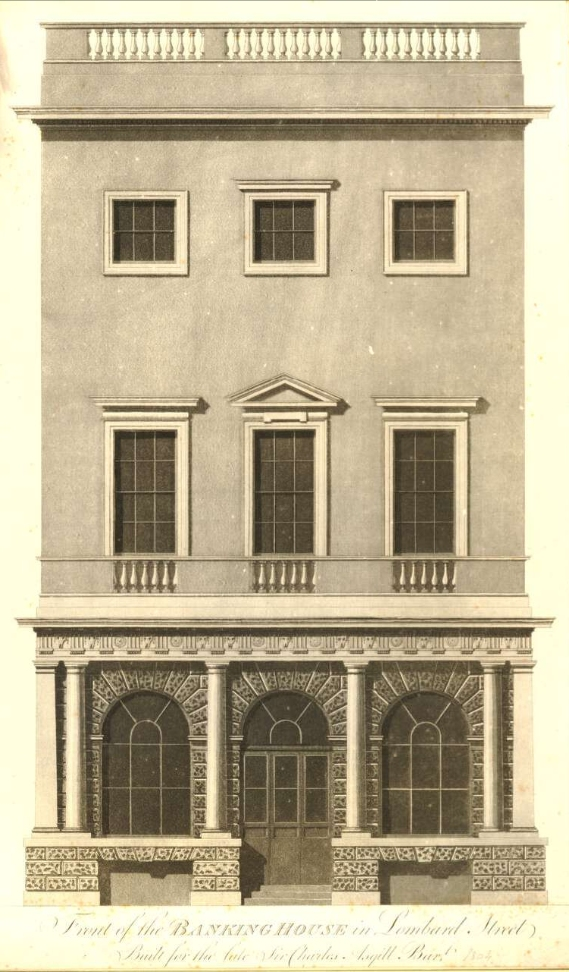
Asgill's bank building at 70 Lombard Street, London

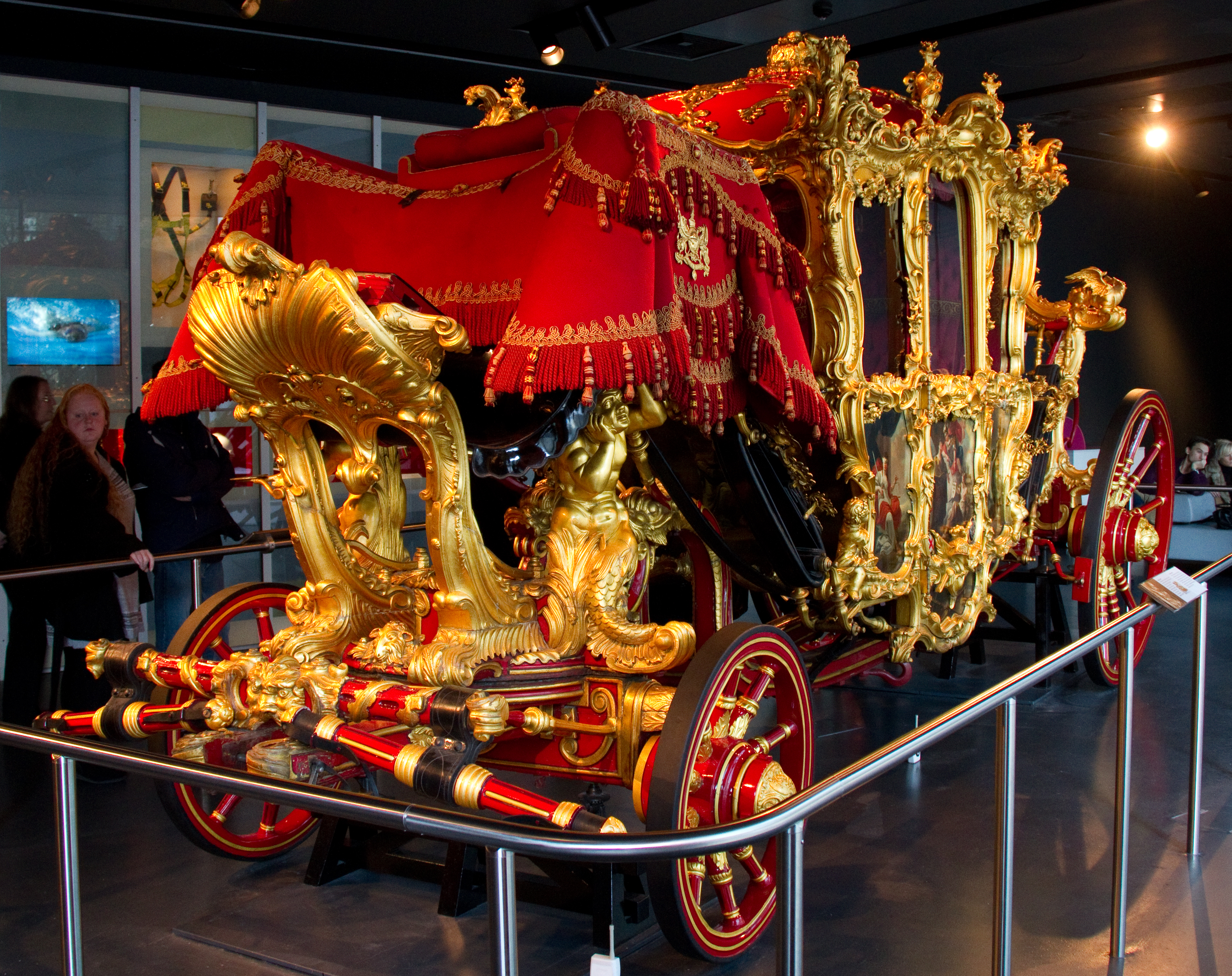
The Lord Mayor’s state coach, commissioned by Asgill in 1757

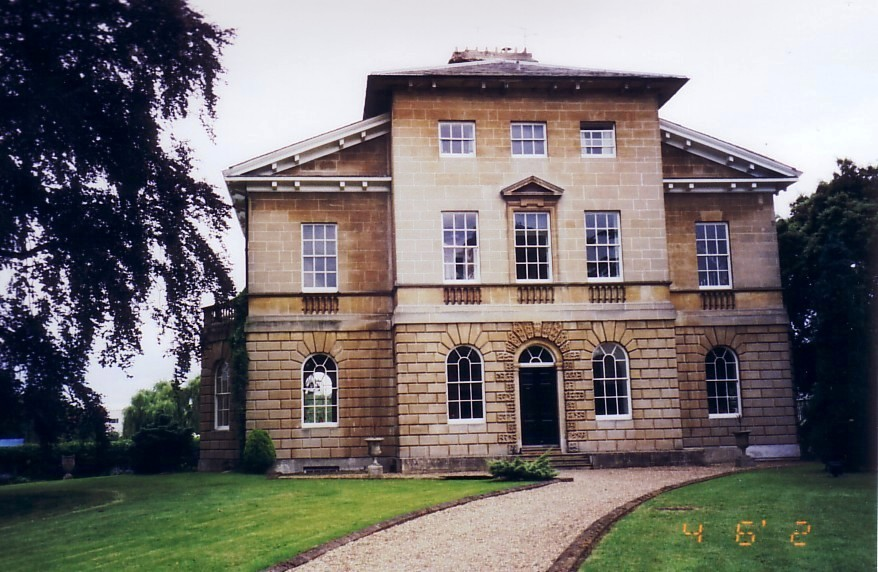
Asgill House, Asgill's Richmond Upon Thames home

Portman Square, location of Asgill's London home

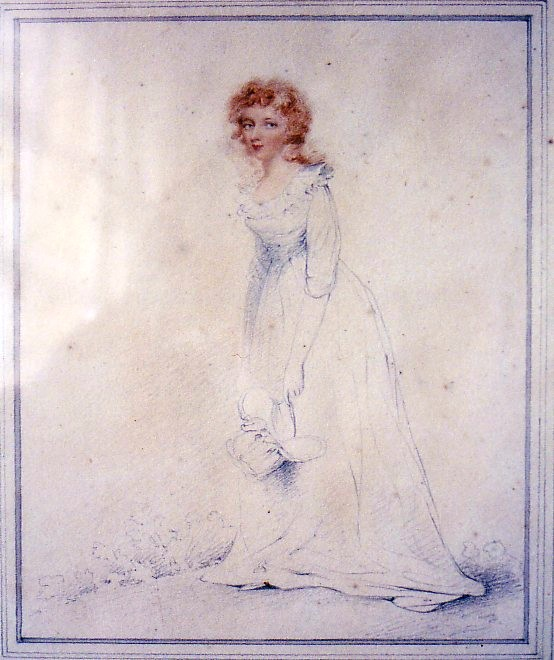
Asgill's daughter, Amelia Angelina Colvile

== Sources ==
- Corporation of London Record Office:

- City Freedom papers for June 1737 for Charles Asgill;
- A. B. Beaven, The Aldermen of the City of London;

- Skinners' Company Freedom Admissions 1724–1764;
- Burke, Extinct and Dormant Baronetcies;
- G. E. Cokayne, Complete Baronetage;
- Musgrave's Obituaries;
- Boyd's London Burials 1538-1853.
- Bridewell Royal Hospital: Minutes of Court of Governors.

Baronetage of Great Britain
| New creation | Baronet (of London); 1761–1788 | Succeeded by Charles Asgill |
