= Louis Masur =

American historian (born 1957)

Louis P. Masur (born 4 February 1957) is an American historian.

Masur is a Distinguished Professor of American Studies and History at Rutgers University. He is an elected member of the American Antiquarian Society, the Massachusetts Historical Society, and the Society of American Historians.

== Bibliography ==
Some of his books are:

- Rites of Execution: Capital Punishment and the Transformation of American Culture, 1776-1865
- The Civil War: A Concise History, also published as The U.S. Civil War: A Very Short Introduction
- 1831: Year of Eclipse
- (Editor) "... the real war will never get in the books": Selections from Writers During the Civil War
- Runaway Dream: Born to Run and Bruce Springsteen's American Vision
- The Soiling of Old Glory: The Story of a Photograph That Shocked America
- Lincoln's Hundred Days: The Emancipation Proclamation and the War for the Union Review
- Autumn Glory: Baseball's First World Series
- Lincoln's Last Speech: Wartime Reconstruction and the Crisis of Reunion
- The Sum of Our Dreams: A Concise History of America
- A Journey North: Jefferson, Madison, and the Forging of a Friendship
