= Sir Charles Asgill, 2nd Baronet =

British soldier (1762–1823)

General Sir Charles Asgill Bt GCH
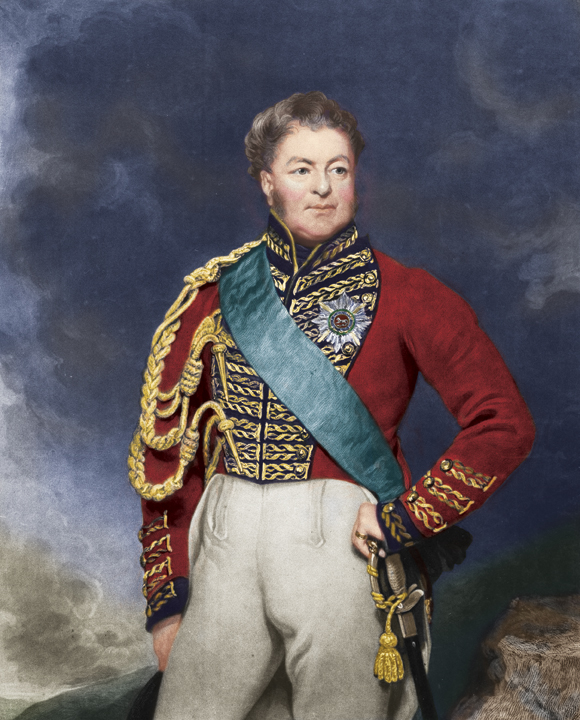
- Colourised image of Asgill from a mezzotint of a lost original by Thomas Phillips

Personal details
- Born: 6 April 1762 London, England
- Died: 23 July 1823 (aged 61) London, England
- Party: Whig
- Spouse: Jemima Sophia Ogle
- Relations: Sir Charles Asgill, 1st Baronet and Sarah Theresa Pratviel.
- Education: Westminster School; University of Göttingen

Military service
- Allegiance: Kingdom of Great Britain (pre Acts of Union 1800); United Kingdom (post Acts of Union 1800)
- Branch/service: British Army
- Years of service: 1778–1823
- Rank: General
- Battles/wars: American War of Independence (1775–1783); Flanders campaign (1792–1795); Irish Rebellion of 1798; Irish Rebellion of 1803

General Sir Charles Asgill, 2nd Baronet, GCH (6 April 1762 – 23 July 1823) was a career soldier in the British Army. At the end of the American Revolutionary War he became the principal of the so-called Asgill Affair of 1782, in which his retaliatory death sentence while a prisoner of war was commuted by the American forces who held him, due to the direct intervention of the government of France. Later in his career, he was involved in the Flanders campaign, the suppression of the Irish Rebellion of 1798, and was Commander of the Eastern Division of Ireland during the Irish rebellion of 1803.

== Early life and education ==
Charles Asgill was born on 6 April 1762, as the only son of a well-connected family. His father, Sir Charles Asgill, had been a former Lord Mayor of London, and was a London banker. His mother, Sarah Theresa Pratviel, was of a French Huguenot family, whose father was secretary to the ambassador to Spain. The family home was Richmond Place, now known as Asgill House, in Surrey. Asgill was educated at Westminster School and the University of Göttingen.

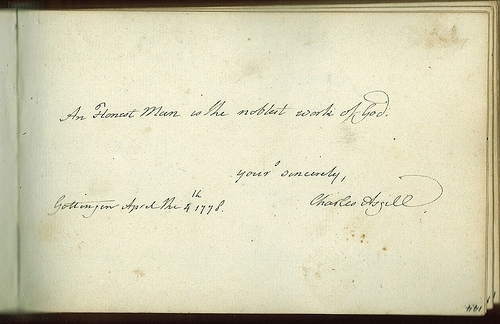
Asgill's handwriting in 1778: "An Honest Man is the noblest work of God."

Against his father's wishes, who offered a sizeable annual income to stay in England, Asgill entered the army on 27 February 1778, just before his 16th birthday, as an ensign in the 1st Foot Guards, a regiment today known as the Grenadier Guards. Asgill became lieutenant in the First Foot Guards, promoted to the rank of captain, in February 1781. (Note: The system of purchasing commissions gave rise to some idiosyncrasies in rank and posting in the prestigious Household and Guard regiments and the value of commissions in these regiments. Regimental appointments were owned by officers of higher ranks than associated with an equivalent position in a line regiment. The appointment of company commander (normally a captaincy) was held by a lieutenant-colonel and styled captain and lieutenant-colonel.)

== The Asgill Affair ==
=== Prisoner of war ===
Asgill was ordered to North America at the beginning of 1781, to fight in the American Revolutionary War. Serving under General Cornwallis, he fought in the Siege of Yorktown, and became an American prisoner of war following Cornwallis's capitulation in October 1781.

Even after the capitulation at Yorktown, violence persisted between the patriots and loyalists. When a loyalist named Philip White was killed by patriots, the loyalists retaliated. A captain of the Monmouth Militia and privateer, Joshua Huddy, was captured in the village of Toms River, New Jersey and taken to a prison in New York. Under the auspices of a prisoner exchange, Richard Lippincott took Huddy from British custody and had him hanged, by order of William Franklin. New Jersey militia protested; to avoid further outbreaks of violence George Washington ordered Moses Hazen to select by lot a British officer likewise to be executed. His explicit orders were communicated in letters dated 3 and 18 May 1782.

On reading the letter of 18 May, James Gordon replied to Washington:

Lancaster 27th. May 1782. Sir It is with astonishment I read a Letter from your Excellency, dated 18th. May, directed to Brigadier General Hazen, Commanding at this Post, ordering him, to send a British Captain, taken at York-town, by Capitulation, with My Lord Cornwallis, Prisoner to Philadelphia, where 'tis said he is to suffer an ignominious Death, in the room of Capt. Huddy an American Officer...

Hazen carried out Washington's orders on 27 May 1782. The selection was made at the Black Bear Tavern in Lancaster, where 13 British 'conditional' officers were assembled. Hazen hoped that the officers would make the selection themselves, but they refused, with one of the prisoners, Samuel Graham, writing that "With one voice we refused to have any share in a business which directly violated the terms of the treaty which placed us within General Washington's power". Lots were instead drawn by a drummer boy (some sources suggest that there were two or three drummer boys) and Asgill's was the one drawn alongside the word "unfortunate".

According to William M. Fowler, as soon as Washington had given the order to take a hostage, he realised that what he had done was morally suspect and likely illegal. While Congress endorsed Washington's actions, others disagreed and Alexander Hamilton considered them "repugnant, wanton and unnecessary".

Soon afterwards Washington wrote to Hazen about Asgill's selection, asking why apparently available 'unconditional' prisoners were not chosen and suggesting to "remedy [...] as soon as possible this Mistake".

=== Chatham ===
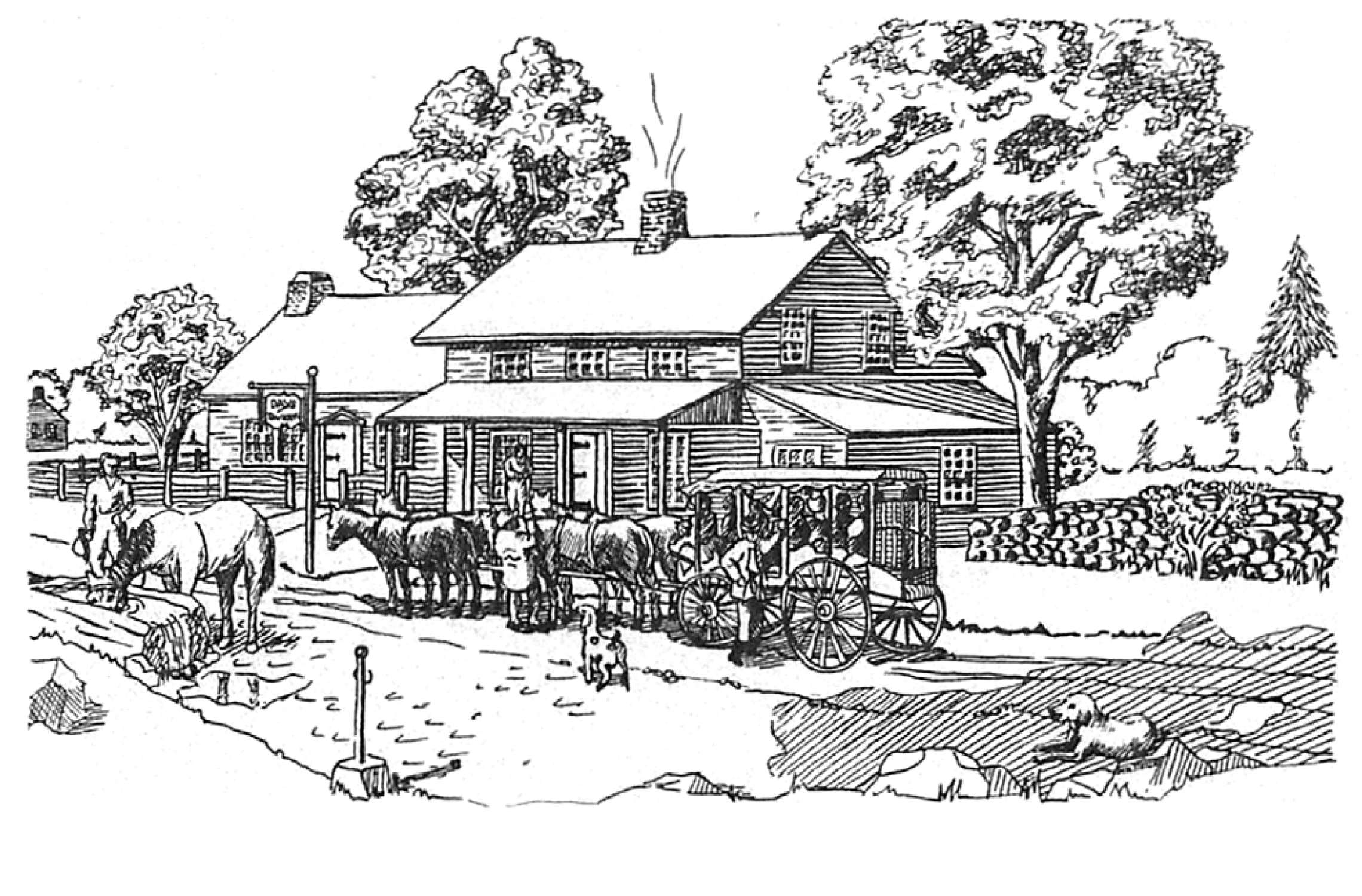
Timothy Day's Tavern, Chatham, NJ, the location of Asgill's imprisonment in 1782

From Lancaster Asgill was transferred to Chatham. Initially he was housed in the home of Colonel Elias Dayton, who commanded the Jersey Line, who treated Asgill well, especially when he became too ill to be moved. Washington ordered Asgill be held under guard. He was sent to Timothy Day's Tavern, where he suffered beatings; lack of edible food; spectators paid to watch his suffering; and deprivation of letters from his family about which he was receiving information that his father was very ill and had died. Although the British court martialled Lippincott for Huddy's execution, he was found not guilty on the grounds that he was acting on orders from William Franklin. Washington wanted Lippincott be released to the Americans in exchange for Asgill, but was refused.

During the months of Asgill's confinement, his fate drew considerable international public attention and also the direct intervention of the government of France on Asgill's behalf. Under pressure to spare Asgill, but unwilling to publicly back down from his position, Washington decided late that summer that the case had become "a great national concern, upon which an individual ought not to decide." He therefore sent the matter to be decided by the Continental Congress.

=== Reaction and release ===
When Asgill's mother, Sarah Theresa, Lady Asgill, heard about her son's fate, she turned to ministers in Whitehall and King George III became involved. She then wrote a letter to the comte de Vergennes, the French Foreign Minister. Vergennes showed the letter to King Louis XVI and Queen Marie Antoinette, who in turn ordered Vergennes to write to Washington saying that any violation of the 14th Article of Capitulation would be a stain on the French nation, as well as the Americans, since both nations, along with the British, had signed that Treaty. Lady Asgill sent a copy of Vergennes' letter to Washington herself, by special courier, and her copies of correspondence reached Washington before the original from Paris.

Upon receipt of Vergennes' letter, enclosing that of Lady Asgill, Washington forwarded the correspondence to the Continental Congress, on 30 October as they were proposing to vote to hang Asgill. The letter was read aloud before the delegates. After several days of debate, on 7 November, "as a compliment to the King of France", Congress passed an Act releasing Asgill.

A week later Washington wrote a letter to Asgill, which he did not receive until 17 November 1782, enclosing a passport for him to return home on parole. Asgill left Chatham immediately that day.

=== Aftermath ===
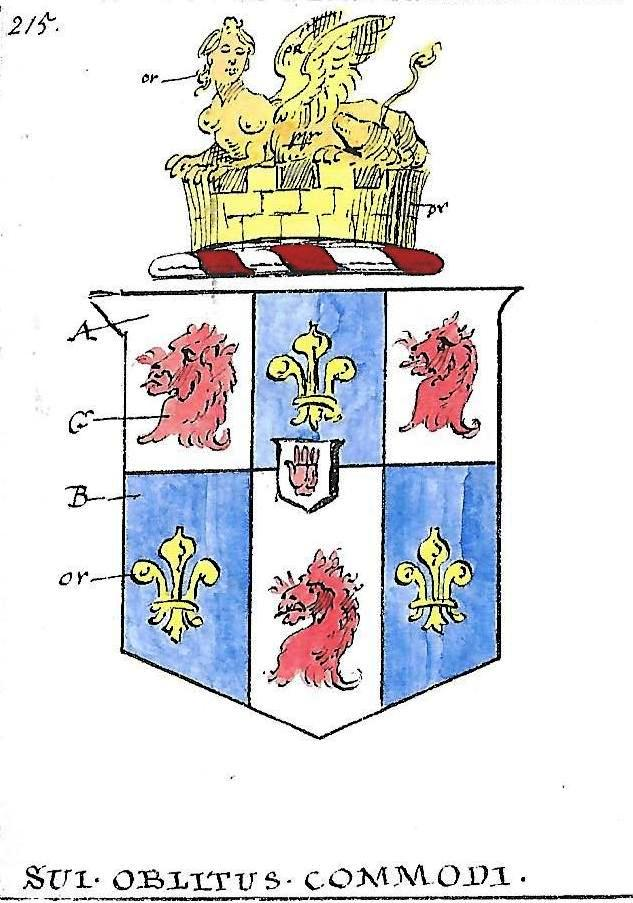
Coat of arms of Sir Charles Asgill, 2nd Baronet. The motto translates as "regardless of his own interest".

Four years after the events of 1782, news reached Washington that Asgill was apparently spreading rumours of ill-treatment whilst in custody in America. Washington was outraged, maintaining that Asgill had been treated well. In response, Washington had his correspondence on the matter published in the New Haven Gazette and Connecticut Magazine on 16 November 1786 (with the exception of his letter of 18 May 1782 to Hazen which shows Washington's willingness to violate Article XIV of the Yorktown Articles of Capitulation). When Asgill read the account, he wrote to the editor on 20 December 1786, denying that he had spread rumours, and detailing his mistreatment while in captivity. Asgill's letter was not published until 2019, when a copy appeared in an issue of The Journal of Lancaster County’s Historical Society dedicated to the Asgill Affair.

Peter Henriques writes that the Asgill Affair "could have left an ugly blot on George Washington's reputation", calling it "a blip that reminds us even the greatest of men make mistakes".

== Subsequent career ==
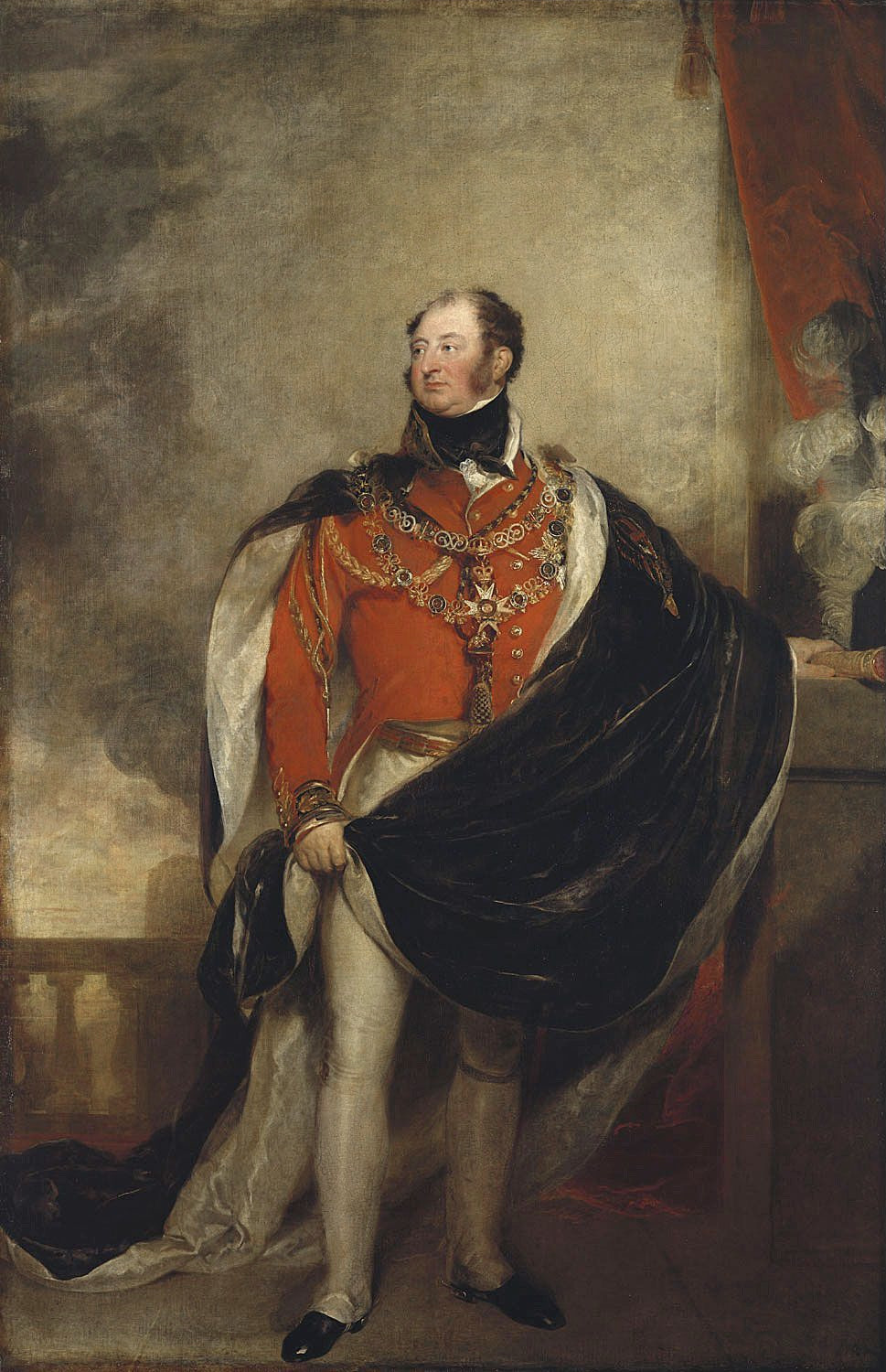
Portrait of the Duke of York by Sir Thomas Lawrence, 1816. York appointed Asgill as an equerry.

Asgill was appointed equerry to Frederick, Duke of York in 1788; he would hold this post until his death. On 15 September 1788 he inherited the Asgill baronetcy upon the death of his father, and on 3 March 1790 he was promoted to command a company in the 1st Foot Guards, with the rank of lieutenant-colonel. Under the Duke of York he took part in the Flanders campaign in 1793. Two years later he rose to the rank of colonel, and later that year commanded a battalion of the Guards at Warley Camp, intended for foreign service.

=== Irish Rebellion of 1798 ===
In June 1797, Asgill was appointed brigadier-general on the Staff in Ireland. He was granted the rank of major-general on 1 January 1798, and was promoted Third Major of the 1st Foot Guards in November that year. (Note: Third major is another position peculiar to Foot Guards regiments of the time. Nominally the second-in-command of each battalion (normally a major's appointment), by seniority of battalions within the regiment (in this case, the third battalion), these positions would be owned by more senior officers.) In his service records, he states he "was very actively employed against the Rebels during the Rebellion in 1798 and received the repeated thanks of the Commander of the Forces and the Government for my Conduct and Service."

General Sir Charles Asgill marched from Kilkenny and attacked and dispersed the rebels.

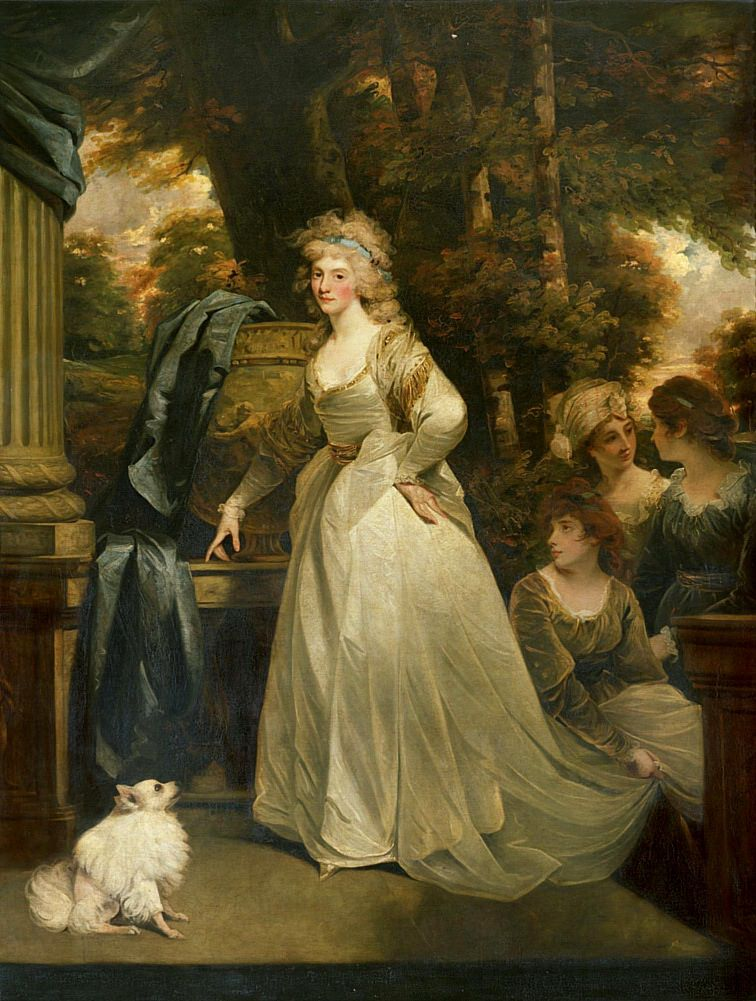
Princess Frederica Charlotte of Prussia by John Hoppner; Sophia Asgill Lady of the Bedchamber sits at her feet.

The city of Kilkenny presented Asgill with a snuff box for his "energy and exertion" which was praised by the Loyalists.

On 9 May 1800 Asgill was transferred from the Foot Guards to be colonel commandant of the 2nd Battalion, 46th (South Devonshire) Regiment of Foot. He went onto half-pay when the 2nd Battalion was disbanded in 1802. Later that year he was again appointed to the Staff in Ireland, commanding the garrison in Dublin and the instruction camps at the Curragh.

=== Service in Dublin ===
In 1801, before being appointed to the garrison in Dublin, Asgill found himself defending the right of Henry Ellis (in the neighbourhood of Kilkenny) to be properly remunerated for the invaluable intelligence he had provided during the rebellion. His information had made a significant contribution to the suppression of the rebels, but he paid a severe price for his loyalty after the fighting was over. His neighbours persecuted him; tried to kill him; and ruined his business as a miller. The British were very slow to pay his annuity of £30 per annum for life. Sir Charles Asgill and Lord Castlereagh took up his cause (with a Mr A. Marsden) to see that he was properly compensated.

In his service records Asgill states: "On the 18th March 1803 I was reappointed to the Staff of Ireland, and placed in the Command of the Eastern District, in which the Garrison of Dublin is included; I was in Command during the Rebellion which broke out in the City in July 1803."

Asgill was promoted to lieutenant general in January 1805.

Asgill was appointed Colonel of the Regiment of the 5th West India Regiment (February 1806); of the 85th Regiment of Foot (October 1806); and of the 11th (North Devonshire) Regiment (25 February 1807), for which he raised a second battalion in the space of six months. Asgill mentions the men of the 11th in his will, in a codicil written on 15 July 1823, eight days before his death.

Asgill, having established a second battalion of the 11th Regiment of Foot, had to pay to equip his men out of his own pocket – he then experienced difficulty receiving a refund from the Treasury.

=== Retirement ===
Asgill received a letter from the Duke of York, on 3 January 1812, telling him that on account of Lieutenant General Sir John Hope's appointment to the Command of the Forces in Ireland, that "you will unavoidably be discontinued on the staff of the Army."

Asgill was almost 50 years old at the time, and explains, in his reply to Colonel John McMahon, Private Secretary to the Prince Regent: "I shall for the first time in my life return to England with a reduced income, and without any employment, which is not very pleasant to my feelings after an uninterrupted service of thirty four years, fifteen of which have been spent on the Staff of Ireland."

Asgill continued to serve on the Staff until 1812, and on 4 June 1814 he was promoted to general. In 1820 he was made a Knight Grand Cross of the Hanoverian Guelphic Order.

== Personal life and death ==
On 28 August 1790 Asgill married Jemima Sophia (1770–1819), sixth daughter of Admiral Sir Chaloner Ogle, 1st Baronet. From 1791 to 1821 Asgill lived at No. 6 York Street, off St James's Square. The Asgills were associated with the duchess of Devonshire's circle. They enjoyed the theatre as well, frequently in the company of Richard Brinsley Sheridan, a personal friend. Lady Asgill died in York Street on 30 May 1819.

Asgill died in 1823. The final two years of Asgill's life were spent at the home of his mistress, Mary Ann Goodchild, otherwise Mansel. Two codicils to his will were written and signed there shortly before his death. Upon his death, the Asgill baronetcy became extinct. One source states that Sophia bore him children.

== Bibliography ==
- Chernow, Ron (2010). Washington: A Life. New York: Penguin Press. ISBN 9781594202667.
- Henriques, Peter R. (2020). First and Always: A New Portrait of George Washington. Charlottesville: University of Virginia Press. ISBN 9780813944807.
- Mayo, Katherine (1938). General Washington's Dilemma. New York: Harcourt, Brace and Company. hdl:2027/uc1.$b61195.
- Vanderpoel, Ambrose (1921). History of Chatham New Jersey. Charles Francis Press.

Military offices
Preceded by Sir Charles Ross	Colonel of the 85th (Bucks Volunteers) Regiment of Foot; 1806–1807	Succeeded by Thomas Slaughter Stanwix
Preceded by Richard FitzPatrick	Colonel of the 11th (the North Devonshire) Regiment of Foot; 1807–1823	Succeeded by Henry Tucker Montresor
Baronetage of Great Britain
Preceded by Charles Asgill	Baronet (of London); 1788–1823	Extinct
