= Joshua Huddy =

US Revolutionary War Captain (1735–1782)

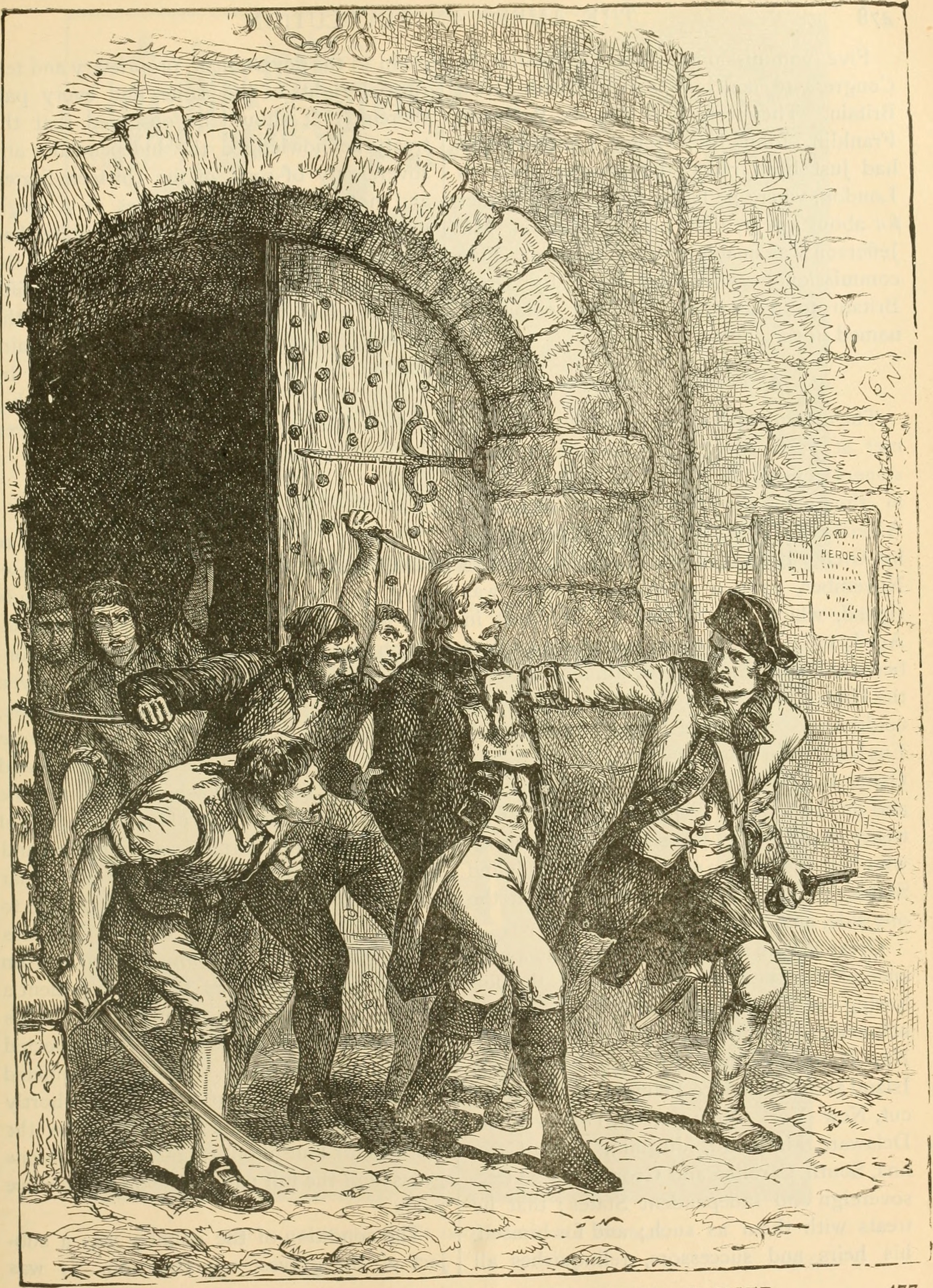
- Huddy being led from prison to be hanged, early 20th century depiction
- Born: November 8, 1735; Salem County, New Jersey
- Died: April 12, 1782 (aged 46); Monmouth County, New Jersey
- Cause of death: Hanging
- Resting place: Old Tennent Cemetery; 40.2838735°N 74.3261134°W
- Occupation: Privateer
- Spouses: Mary Borden (m. 1764; died 1771) Catherine Applegate (m. 1778)
- Children: 2
- Military career
- Allegiance: United States
- Branch: New Jersey Militia
- Service years: 1777–1782
- Rank: Captain
- Conflicts: American Revolutionary War

Captain Joshua Huddy (November 8, 1735 – April 12, 1782) was an American military officer and privateer. Born in Salem County, New Jersey, he struggled with financial difficulties in adulthood and was repeatedly convicted of several crimes. During the American Revolutionary War, Huddy supported the Patriot cause and served in the New Jersey Militia along with captaining the privateer ship The Black Snake. In 1782, he was captured by Loyalist irregulars and turned over to the British.

Shortly thereafter, a group of Loyalists removed Huddy from British custody and summarily executed him by hanging. His execution led to a furore among Patriots and sparked the Asgill Affair, in which the Continental Army arranged for the summary execution of British officer Charles Asgill, an act that violated the terms of the 1781 Articles of Capitulation. After diplomatic pressure from the Kingdom of France, the Congress of the Confederation voted to order Asgill's release, ending the affair.

== Early life ==
Huddy was born November 8, 1735, to a prosperous family in Salem County, Province of New Jersey, the oldest of seven brothers. His grandfather, Hugh Huddy, was a well-known judge in Burlington. Huddy spent most of his early life in Salem, where he was labeled a rebellious troublemaker. He was disowned by Quakers in Salem in 1757 for his "disorderly" conduct.

His troubles continued into adulthood; he was tried and convicted several times for crimes including assault and theft and repeatedly had financial difficulties. He was forced to sell a 300-acre (1.2 km^{2}) plantation in Salem to pay his debts and was forced into debtors' prison for a time. In 1764, he married his first wife, the widowed Mary Borden, by whom he had two daughters, Elizabeth and Martha, before her death.

In the 1770s, Huddy moved to Colts Neck in Monmouth County. There, on October 27, 1778, he married his second wife, Catherine (Applegate) Hart, also a widow and owner of the Colts Neck Tavern, which she had inherited from her first husband, Levy Hart. The Monmouth County sheriff later accused Huddy of trying to steal the tavern from his wife, and to force her children out onto the street. He often appeared in civil and criminal court, either as plaintiff or defendant.

== Military career ==
Huddy aligned with the Patriots during the American Revolutionary War. On September 4, 1777, he was appointed as a captain in the Monmouth Militia by the New Jersey State Legislature. He was a popular and aggressive captain, engaging in the raids that characterized the fighting within Monmouth County. In October 1777, he allegedly took part in the execution of Loyalist Stephen Edwards, who was dragged from his home in Shrewsbury, New Jersey before being hanged from an oak tree.

Huddy's involvement in the Philadelphia campaign is unclear, though it's widely believed that he and his men took part in the Battles of Germantown (1777) and Monmouth (1778). Huddy and the Monmouth militia also harassed the British as they marched from Freehold to Sandy Hook, where the British Army was planning to travel from New Jersey back to British-occupied New York.

In August 1780, the Continental Congress issued Huddy a commission to operate the gunboat The Black Snake, as well as a letter of marque to operate as a privateer. Colonel Tye leading a small group of African Americans and Queen's Rangers on a night raid of Colts Neck one month later, capturing Huddy in his house. Huddy and his mistress Lucretia Edmonds held off the attackers in a two-hour-long gun battle, but the Loyalists set fire to his house and Huddy surrendered on the condition that they would extinguish the blaze. Colonel Tye took Huddy to Rumson, New Jersey and put him on a boat bound for New York City. Patriots on the other side of the Shrewsbury River opened fire on the boat, causing it to capsize. 6 loyalists were killed and Colonel Tye was wounded (which caused his death). Huddy was hit in the thigh by a bullet, but he escaped and swam to shore.

== Capture and execution ==
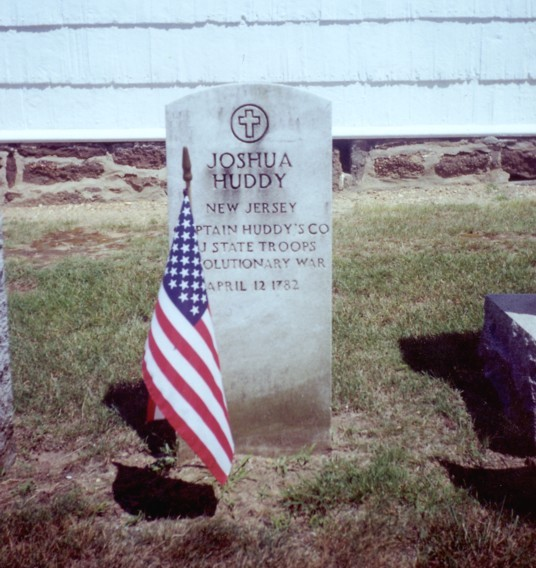
Cenotaph for Huddy on the grounds of the Old Tennent Church

On February 1, 1782, Huddy was given command of the blockhouse, a small fort at the village of Toms River that was built to protect the local salt works. The salt was needed to cure meat destined for American troops, and the Toms River was an important launch point for Patriot privateers. On March 24, a large, irregular force of approximately 80 Loyalists overwhelmed Huddy's small band of defenders and took the fort. They destroyed the blockhouse, salt works, and local mills, and they razed all but two houses in the village.

Huddy was transferred to a military prison ship in New York harbor. He was then taken from British custody by a band of Loyalists headed by Captain Richard Lippincott, ostensibly to make a prisoner exchange. No such exchange was planned, however. Instead, Lippincott's forces took Huddy by boat to Middletown Point, a location on the south coast of Sandy Hook Bay. They landed on the beach at the foot of the Navesink Hills. There they hanged Huddy on April 12, 1782, after allowing him to dictate and sign his will.

Huddy's summary execution by the Loyalists was retaliation for the death of Loyalist farmer Philip White. The executioners left a note pinned to Huddy's body:

We the Refugees having with Grief Long beheld the cruel murders of our Brethren & findg nothing but Such measures Daily carrying into Execution.

We therefore Determine not to suffer without takg Vengeance for numerous Cruelties and thus begin and have made use of—Capt. Huddy as the first Object to present to your Views, and further Determine to Hang Man for Man as Long as a Refugee is Left Existing.

Up Goes Huddy for Phillip White.

It was reported in a letter to Washington that Huddy maintained his innocence in the death of Phillip White, and that he "should Dye Innocent, and in a good Cause, and with uncommon Composure of Mind and fortitude prepared Himself for his End", and that "Capt. Huddy dyed with the firmness of a Lyon."

The next morning, Patriots found Huddy's body hanging from the gallows, cut it down, and took it to Freehold, where they buried him at Old Tennent Church. Over 400 people gathered to protest his execution and sent a petition to General George Washington, demanding retribution by execution of a British officer of similar rank if Lippincott was not surrendered. Both Washington and General Henry Clinton condemned the hanging, and the British forbade the Board of Loyalists from removing any additional prisoners. Clinton's successor Guy Carleton later abolished the organization.

== Asgill Affair ==
Patriotic sentiment ran high following the killing of Huddy. To avert independent reprisals by the New Jersey militia, Washington agreed to the proposition to select a British prisoner of war for retaliatory execution. Washington issued an order to General Moses Hazen to select a British prisoner by lot to be hanged in retribution. Straws were drawn on May 26, 1782, and a young British officer, Captain Charles Asgill, drew the short straw. If Lippincott was not turned over for trial, Asgill was to be executed. The situation was complicated by the fact that Asgill and the other British captive officers were protected under the terms of surrender agreed to between British General Charles Cornwallis and Washington following the Siege of Yorktown in October of the previous year. Executing Asgill would have violated the terms of the surrender and created a black eye for the rebellious colonials who were intent upon establishing an independent nation.

The British managed to delay Asgill's execution by promising to hold their own court-martial of Lippincott. The court-martial acquitted and freed Lippincott, finding that he had acted on orders from a civil officer, since the Crown still considered William Franklin as officially New Jersey's royal governor. Washington turned to an old associate, General Benjamin Lincoln, formerly the second in command of the Continental Army and the acting Secretary of War of the Americans. While he and other ranking Continental Army officers continued to favor a retaliatory killing, they urged patience. The delay ultimately allowed sufficient time for Intercession by the Americans' French allies. The mother of the condemned British captain appealed directly for help to French King Louis XVI and his wife, Marie Antoinette. French Foreign Minister Comte de Vergennes was directed to plead Asgill's case to Washington.

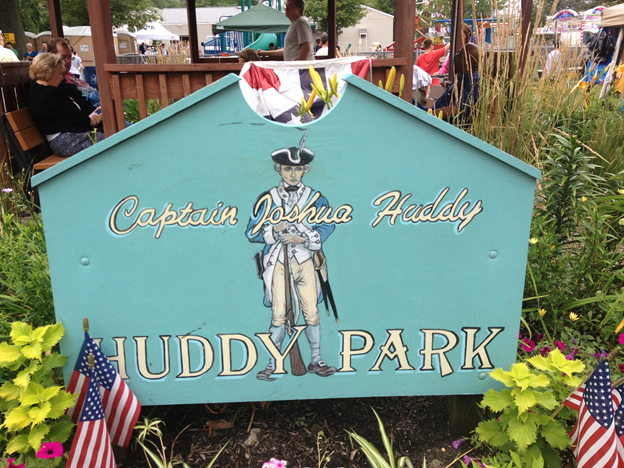
Huddy Park sign

Catherine Hart, Huddy's widow, also said that she wanted Asgill's life spared since the captain was innocent. Backed by diplomatic pressure to lift the execution order, the military turned the issue over to the Congress of the Confederation for decision. Asgill was freed by order of Congress passed on November 7, 1782. Asgill was issued a pass to British lines and returned to Britain. After the war, Lippincott emigrated to Canada, where the Loyalist was granted 3,000 acres (12 km^{2}) by the Crown as a reward for his services to Britain.

== Legacy ==
Huddy's legacy lives on throughout Central New Jersey, specifically Monmouth County. In Highlands, New Jersey, Huddy Park as well as a street are named after him. A plaque in West Park in Rumson, New Jersey honors Huddy's escape from the capsized boat he was captured on. Another plaque in Colts Neck, New Jersey was erected in 1977.

A restaurant in Colts Neck, Huddy's Inn, is situated on the opposite corner from the original Colts Neck Inn.

Huddy Park, the oldest municipal park in Toms River, New Jersey, is located approximately near the site of the original blockhouse.
