= Richard Lippincott =

Richard Lippincott may refer to:

- Richard Lippincott (Quaker) (1615–1683), early settler of Shrewsbury, New Jersey
- Richard Lippincott (Loyalist) (1745–1826), American-born Loyalist who served in the British army during the American War of Independence
