= Little Silver School District =

Public school district in Monmouth County, New Jersey, US

- District offices

Address
- 124 Willow Drive Little Silver, Monmouth County, New Jersey, 07739; United States
- Coordinates: 40.332788°N 74.041401°W

District information
- Grades: pre-K to 8
- Superintendent: Eric Platt
- Business administrator: Caryn Anderson
- Schools: 2

Students and staff
- Enrollment: 776 (as of 2021–22)
- Faculty: 77.8 FTEs
- Student–teacher ratio: 10.0:1

Other information
- District Factor Group: J
- Website: www.littlesilverschools.org
Ind.	Per pupil	District spending	Rank (*)	K-8 average	%± vs. average
1A	Total Spending	$17,078	38	$18,891	−9.6%
1	Budgetary Cost	12,657	20	14,159	−10.6%
2	Classroom Instruction	7,638	16	8,659	−11.8%
6	Support Services	1,965	35	2,167	−9.3%
8	Administrative Cost	1,469	30	1,547	−5.0%
10	Operations & Maintenance	1,337	24	1,612	−17.1%
13	Extracurricular Activities	107	53	104	2.9%
16	Median Teacher Salary	60,465	35	61,136
Data from NJDoE 2014 Taxpayers' Guide to Education Spending. *Of K-8 districts with more than 750 students. Lowest spending=1; Highest=84

The Little Silver School District is a community public school district that serves students in pre-kindergarten through eighth grade from Little Silver, in Monmouth County, in the U.S. state of New Jersey.

As of the 2021–22 school year, the district, comprised of two schools, had an enrollment of 776 students and 77.8 classroom teachers (on an FTE basis), for a student–teacher ratio of 10.0:1.

The district is classified by the New Jersey Department of Education as being in District Factor Group "J", the-highest of eight groupings. District Factor Groups organize districts statewide to allow comparison by common socioeconomic characteristics of the local districts. From lowest socioeconomic status to highest, the categories are A, B, CD, DE, FG, GH, I and J.

For ninth through twelfth grades, students attend Red Bank Regional High School, which serves students from the boroughs of Little Silver, Red Bank and Shrewsbury, along with students in the district's academy programs from other communities who are eligible to attend on a tuition basis. Students from other Monmouth County municipalities are eligible to attend the high school for its performing arts program, with admission on a competitive basis. The borough has two elected representatives on the nine-member board of education. As of the 2021–22 school year, the high school had an enrollment of 1,247 students and 117.8 classroom teachers (on an FTE basis), for a student–teacher ratio of 10.6:1.

== Schools ==
Schools in the district (with 2021–22 enrollment data from the National Center for Education Statistics) are:

Elementary school

- Point Road School with 393 students in grades PreK-4
  - Kathleen Stigliano, principal

Middle school

- Markham Place School with 380 students in grades 5-8
  - Anthonio Pepe, principal

== Administration ==
Core members of the district's administration are:

- Eric Platt, superintendent
- Caryn Anderson, business administrator and board secretary

== Board of education ==
The district's board of education, comprised of seven members, sets policy and oversees the fiscal and educational operation of the district through its administration. As a Type II school district, the board's trustees are elected directly by voters to serve three-year terms of office on a staggered basis, with either two or three seats up for election each year held (since 2012) as part of the November general election. The board appoints a superintendent to oversee the district's day-to-day operations and a business administrator to supervise the business functions of the district.
