= Shrewsbury Borough School District =

School district in Monmouth County, New Jersey, US

Address
- 20 Obre Place Shrewsbury, Monmouth County, New Jersey, 07702; United States
- Coordinates: 40.328548°N 74.064107°W

District information
- Grades: PreK-8
- Superintendent: Brent A. MacConnell
- Business administrator: Lindsey Case
- Schools: 1

Students and staff
- Enrollment: 443 (as of 2024–25)
- Faculty: 52.0 FTEs
- Student–teacher ratio: 8.5:1

Other information
- District Factor Group: I
- Website: www.sbs.k12.nj.us
Ind.	Per pupil	District spending	Rank (*)	K-8 average	%± vs. average
1A	Total Spending	$17,700	26	$18,891	−6.3%
1	Budgetary Cost	14,558	35	14,159	2.8%
2	Classroom Instruction	8,584	33	8,659	−0.9%
6	Support Services	2,317	37	2,167	6.9%
8	Administrative Cost	1,794	42	1,547	16.0%
10	Operations & Maintenance	1,807	47	1,612	12.1%
13	Extracurricular Activities	38	7	104	−63.5%
16	Median Teacher Salary	54,135	11	61,136
Data from NJDoE 2014 Taxpayers' Guide to Education Spending. *Of K-8 districts with 401-750 students. Lowest spending=1; Highest=64

The Shrewsbury Borough School District is a community public school district that serves students ranging from pre-kindergarten through eighth grade from Shrewsbury, in Monmouth County, in the U.S. state of New Jersey. The school features three homerooms per grade.

As of the 2024–25 school year, the district, comprised of one school, had an enrollment of 443 students and 52.0 classroom teachers (on an FTE basis), for a student–teacher ratio of 8.5:1.

The district had been classified by the New Jersey Department of Education as being in District Factor Group "I", the second-highest of eight groupings. District Factor Groups organize districts statewide to allow comparison by common socioeconomic characteristics of the local districts. From lowest socioeconomic status to highest, the categories are A, B, CD, DE, FG, GH, I and J.

For ninth through twelfth grades, most public school students are assigned to attend Red Bank Regional High School, which also serves students from the boroughs of Little Silver and Red Bank, along with students in the district's academy programs from other communities who are eligible to attend on a tuition basis. Students from other Monmouth County municipalities are eligible to attend the high school for its performing arts program, with admission on a competitive basis. The borough has two elected representatives on the nine-member board of education. As of the 2024–25 school year, the high school had an enrollment of 1,261 students and 124.8 classroom teachers (on an FTE basis), for a student–teacher ratio of 10.1:1.

== School ==
The Shrewsbury Borough School had an enrollment of 439 students in grades PreK–8 during the 2024–25 school year.

== Administration ==
Core members of the school's administration are:

- Brent A. MacConnell, superintendent
- Lindsey Case, business administrator and board secretary

== Board of education ==
The district's board of education, composed of nine members, sets policy and oversees the fiscal and educational operation of the district through its administration. As a Type II school district, the board's trustees are elected directly by voters to serve three-year terms of office on a staggered basis, with three seats up for election each year held (since 2012) as part of the November general election. The board appoints a superintendent to oversee the district's day-to-day operations and a business administrator to supervise the business functions of the district.
