= Richard Lippincott (Quaker) =

American settler (1615–1683)

Richard Lippincott (1615 – 1683) was an early settler of Shrewsbury, New Jersey. Lippincott was a member of the Religious Society of Friends, also known as the Quakers, who emigrated to New Jersey after suffering persecution for his religious beliefs in England and Massachusetts.

== Life ==
Born in Devon, England, Richard Lippincott migrated to Massachusetts Bay Colony as part of the Great Puritan Migration in the 1630s and settled in Dorchester, Massachusetts Bay Colony. He became a member of the Church of Dorchester and later the Church of Boston. He was elected as a Freeman by the General Court of Boston on 13 May 1640.

His first child, a son named Remembrance, was born in Dorchester. Richard and his wife Abigail moved to Boston where a second son, John, and a daughter, Abigail (who died shortly after birth), were born and baptized by the Rev. John Cotton. Richard Lippincott became disillusioned with New England Puritanism. He was excommunicated by the Church of Boston in 1651, after which he and his wife Abigail returned to England where they resided at Stonehouse, Plymouth and had additional children: Restore, Increase, Freedom, and Jacob.

In England, Richard Lippincott became a member of the Society of Friends (Quakers). Along with other Quakers, he was subjected to persecution and jailed. After his release, he and his family moved to Rhode Island and then to Shrewsbury, New Jersey where he was the largest landowner and an esteemed member of the community.

The descendants of Richard and Abigail Lippincott proliferated throughout New Jersey. Many of them settled in Burlington, Salem and Gloucester counties, including a family of twelve children of George and Rachel Lippincott of Woodstown, New Jersey. The story of Richard and Abigail Lippincott covers a wide swath of American history and is emblematic of the courage and industry of early settlers who sought to build lasting communities based on principles of religious freedom and civil liberties.

== Famous descendants ==
- George W. Bush, a descendant of Richard Lippincott's son Freedom, through his mother, Barbara Bush
- Richard Nixon, a descendant of Richard's son Restore Lippincott
- Kevin Bacon, a descendant of his son Restore Lippincott
- Sam Waterston, American Actor, a descendant of Richard's son Freedom Lippincott through his mother, Alice.
- Richard Lippincott (Loyalist), American Loyalist and British Army officer who fled to Canada, a descendant of Richard's son Remembrance
- Ellis R. Lippincott, American scientist, a descendant of Richard Lippincott through his sons Restore and John
