= Shrewsbury, New Jersey =

Borough in Monmouth County, New Jersey, US

- Borough
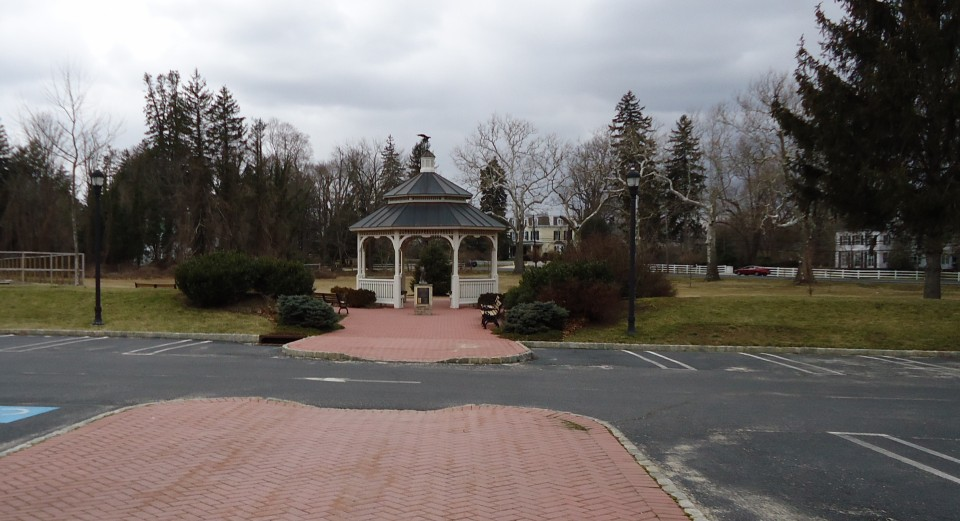
- Public park near Shrewsbury's municipal building

- Seal
- Motto: Small Town, Strong Roots
- Location of Shrewsbury in Monmouth County highlighted in red (left). Inset map: Location of Monmouth County in New Jersey highlighted in orange (right).

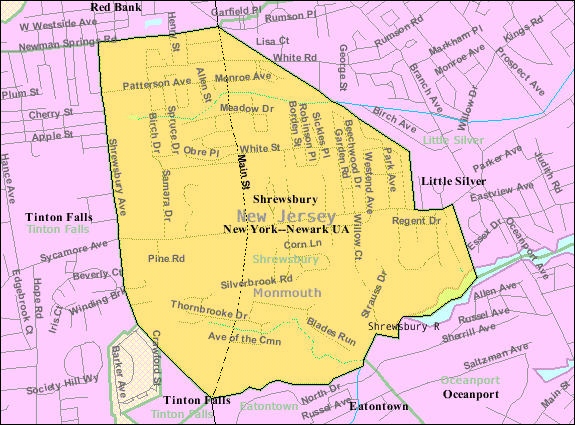
- Census Bureau map of Shrewsbury, New Jersey
- Interactive map of Shrewsbury, New Jersey
- Location in Monmouth County Location in New Jersey Location in the United States
- Coordinates: 40°19′30″N 74°3′36″W
- Country: United States
- State: New Jersey
- County: Monmouth
- Incorporated: May 11, 1926
- Named for: Shrewsbury, England

Government
  - Type: Borough
  - Body: Borough Council
  - Mayor: Kimberly Eulner (R, term ends December 31, 2028)
  - Administrator: Christopher Cherbini
  - Municipal clerk: Kerry Quinn

Area
  - Total: 2.19 sq mi (5.67 km^{2})
  - Land: 2.16 sq mi (5.60 km^{2})
  - Water: 0.027 sq mi (0.07 km^{2}) 1.32%
  - Rank: 395th of 565 in state 27th of 53 in county
- Elevation: 46 ft (14 m)

Population (2020)
  - Total: 4,184
  - Estimate (2023): 4,149
  - Rank: 408th of 565 in state 38th of 53 in county
  - Density: 1,936.6/sq mi (747.7/km^{2})
  - Rank: 298th of 565 in state 37th of 53 in county
- Time zone: UTC−05:00 (Eastern (EST))
  - Summer (DST): UTC−04:00 (Eastern (EDT))
- ZIP Code: 07702
- Area code: 732
- FIPS code: 3402567350
- GNIS feature ID: 885395
- Website: www.shrewsburyboro.com

Shrewsbury is a borough in eastern Monmouth County, in the U.S. state of New Jersey. Located within the heart of the northern Jersey Shore region, the borough is a bedroom community of New York City. As of the 2020 United States census, the borough's population was 4,184, its highest decennial count ever and an increase of 375 (+9.8%) from the 2010 census count of 3,809, which in turn reflected an increase of 219 (+6.1%) from the 3,590 counted in the 2000 census.

Shrewsbury was formed as a borough by an act of the New Jersey Legislature on March 22, 1926, from portions of Shrewsbury Township, based on the results of a referendum held on May 11, 1926. The borough's name comes from Shrewsbury, England.

== History ==
Shrewsbury was part of the Navesink Patent or Monmouth Tract granted soon after the creation of East Jersey in 1665. The tract included Shrewsbury, along with the other historic communities of Freehold Township in western Monmouth County and Middletown Township in northern Monmouth County.

When it was formed in 1693, Shrewsbury covered an area of almost 1,000 square miles (2,600 km^{2}), extending to the north to the Navesink River, south to include all of present-day Ocean County, east to the Atlantic Ocean and west to the present-day border of Monmouth County. It retained its size and scope until 1750, when various different municipalities began to break off from it. The first of those being Stafford Township, which was formed in 1750 and taking away much of modern-day Ocean County. The Parker Homestead, one of the oldest structures in the state, was built by early settlers to the region. Many of the early settlers of the region originated from Long Island, Rhode Island, and Massachusetts.

What is now Shrewsbury Township was originally formed on October 31, 1693, and was created as a township by the Township Act of 1798 of the New Jersey Legislature on February 21, 1798. Shrewsbury Borough broke off from Shrewsbury Township, and was officially established on May 11, 1926.

== Geography ==
According to the United States Census Bureau, the borough had a total area of 2.19 square miles (5.67 km^{2}), including 2.16 square miles (5.60 km^{2}) of land and 0.03 square miles (0.07 km^{2}) of water (1.32%).

The borough borders the Monmouth County municipalities of Eatontown, Little Silver, Oceanport, Red Bank, Shrewsbury Township and Tinton Falls.

Shrewsbury Borough prior to 1926 was a part of Shrewsbury Township, which had originally encompassed most of Monmouth and Ocean counties, including several of the other municipalities nearby, until finally shrinking down to under one square mile.

== Demographics ==
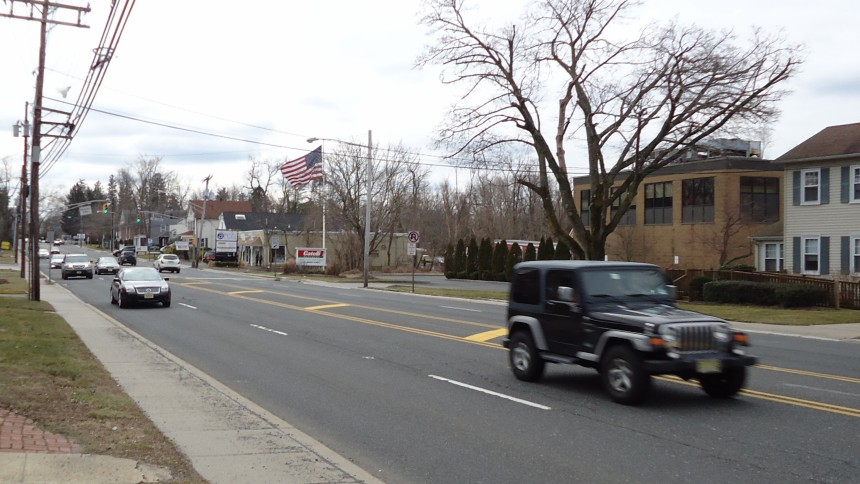
Route 35 is a main commercial thoroughfare for the borough.

Historical population
| Census | Pop. | Note | %± |
|---|---|---|---|
| 1930 | 857 | | — |
| 1940 | 1,058 | | 23.5% |
| 1950 | 1,613 | | 52.5% |
| 1960 | 3,222 | | 99.8% |
| 1970 | 3,315 | | 2.9% |
| 1980 | 2,962 | | −10.6% |
| 1990 | 3,096 | | 4.5% |
| 2000 | 3,590 | | 16.0% |
| 2010 | 3,809 | | 6.1% |
| 2020 | 4,184 | | 9.8% |
| 2023 (est.) | 4,149 | ▼ | −0.8% |
Population sources: 1930; 1940–2000 2000; 2010 2020

=== 2020 census ===
As of the 2020 census, Shrewsbury had a population of 4,184. The median age was 47.0 years. 23.4% of residents were under the age of 18 and 23.4% were 65 years of age or older. For every 100 females, there were 91.6 males, and for every 100 females age 18 and over, there were 86.0 males.

100.0% of residents lived in urban areas, while 0.0% lived in rural areas.

There were 1,456 households, of which 36.5% had children under the age of 18 living in them. Of all households, 68.2% were married-couple households, 8.9% were households with a male householder and no spouse or partner present, and 19.8% were households with a female householder and no spouse or partner present. About 18.9% of all households were made up of individuals, and 12.0% had someone living alone who was 65 years of age or older.

There were 1,509 housing units, of which 3.5% were vacant. The homeowner vacancy rate was 1.3% and the rental vacancy rate was 5.3%.

Racial composition as of the 2020 census
| Race | Number | Percent |
|---|---|---|
| White | 3,736 | 89.3% |
| Black or African American | 64 | 1.5% |
| American Indian and Alaska Native | 4 | 0.1% |
| Asian | 97 | 2.3% |
| Native Hawaiian and Other Pacific Islander | 1 | 0.0% |
| Some other race | 54 | 1.3% |
| Two or more races | 228 | 5.4% |
| Hispanic or Latino (of any race) | 165 | 3.9% |

=== 2010 census ===
The 2010 United States census counted 3,809 people, 1,261 households, and 1,026 families in the borough. The population density was 1,757.2 per square mile (678.5/km^{2}). There were 1,310 housing units at an average density of 604.4 per square mile (233.4/km^{2}). The racial makeup was 95.62% (3,642) White, 0.66% (25) Black or African American, 0.11% (4) Native American, 2.13% (81) Asian, 0.03% (1) Pacific Islander, 0.58% (22) from other races, and 0.89% (34) from two or more races. Hispanic or Latino of any race were 2.49% (95) of the population.

Of the 1,261 households, 40.7% had children under the age of 18; 71.5% were married couples living together; 8.2% had a female householder with no husband present and 18.6% were non-families. Of all households, 16.5% were made up of individuals and 9.2% had someone living alone who was 65 years of age or older. The average household size was 2.87 and the average family size was 3.24.

27.0% of the population were under the age of 18, 5.0% from 18 to 24, 19.2% from 25 to 44, 31.2% from 45 to 64, and 17.6% who were 65 years of age or older. The median age was 44.3 years. For every 100 females, the population had 87.7 males. For every 100 females ages 18 and older there were 84.7 males.

The Census Bureau's 2006–2010 American Community Survey showed that (in 2010 inflation-adjusted dollars) median household income was $111,648 (with a margin of error of +/− $15,595) and the median family income was $124,091 (+/− $10,340). Males had a median income of $111,645 (+/− $13,085) versus $54,313 (+/− $9,453) for females. The per capita income for the borough was $47,698 (+/− $5,936). About none of families and 1.1% of the population were below the poverty line, including none of those under age 18 and 4.3% of those age 65 or over.

=== 2000 census ===
As of the 2000 United States census there were 3,590 people, 1,207 households, and 1,016 families residing in the borough. The population density was 1,627.1 inhabitants per square mile (628.2/km^{2}). There were 1,223 housing units at an average density of 554.3 per square mile (214.0/km^{2}). The racial makeup of the borough was 96.60% White, 0.53% African American, 1.67% Asian, 0.36% from other races, and 0.84% from two or more races. Hispanic or Latino of any race were 1.92% of the population.

There were 1,207 households, out of which 46.0% had children under the age of 18 living with them, 74.6% were married couples living together, 7.2% had a female householder with no husband present, and 15.8% were non-families. 12.9% of all households were made up of individuals, and 6.9% had someone living alone who was 65 years of age or older. The average household size was 2.96 and the average family size was 3.27.

In the borough the population was spread out, with 30.8% under the age of 18, 4.0% from 18 to 24, 28.1% from 25 to 44, 25.1% from 45 to 64, and 12.0% who were 65 years of age or older. The median age was 38 years. For every 100 females, there were 98.5 males. For every 100 females age 18 and over, there were 93.2 males.

The median income for a household in the borough was $86,911, and the median income for a family was $92,719. Males had a median income of $85,875 versus $37,554 for females. The per capita income for the borough was $38,218. None of the families and 1.0% of the population were living below the poverty line, including no under 18 and 3.0% of those over 64.

== Economy ==
The Grove at Shrewsbury is an upscale lifestyle center located on Route 35. The center opened in 1988 and has a gross leasable area of 150,000 sq ft (14,000 m^{2}). It has been anchored by Brooks Brothers, Anthropologie, J. Crew, Williams Sonoma and Banana Republic, along with other retailers and amenities. It acts as a town square for the borough, along with the nearby downtown of Red Bank.

== Government ==
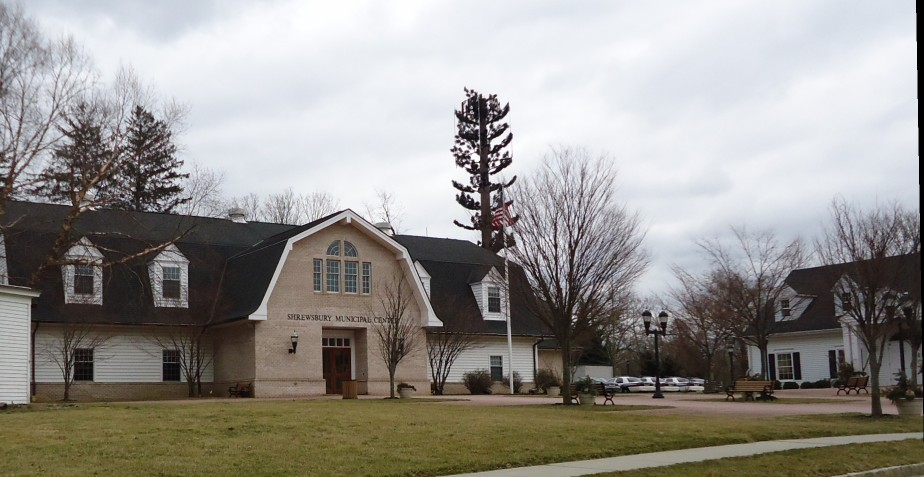
Municipal building.

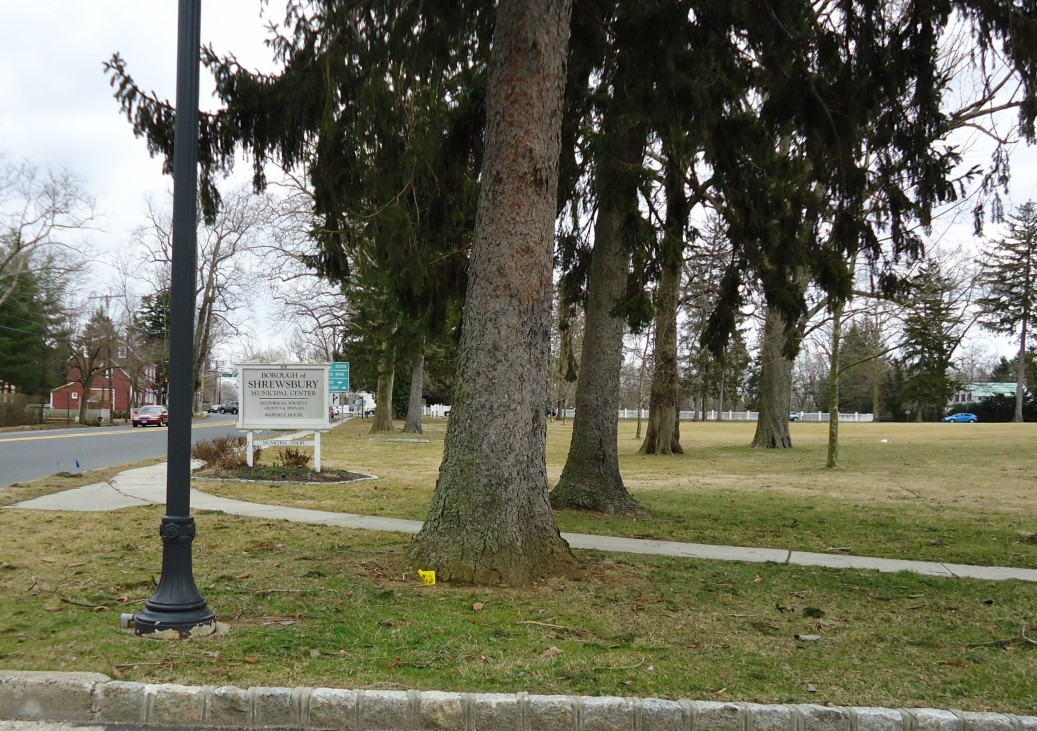
Public park near the borough hall.

=== Local government ===
Shrewsbury is governed under the borough form of New Jersey municipal government, which is used in 218 municipalities (of the 564) statewide, making it the most common form of government in New Jersey. The governing body is comprised of the mayor and the borough council, with all positions elected at-large on a partisan basis as part of the November general election. A mayor is elected directly by the voters to a four-year term of office. The borough council includes six members elected to serve three-year terms on a staggered basis, with two seats coming up for election each year in a three-year cycle. The borough form of government used by Shrewsbury is a "weak mayor / strong council" government in which council members act as the legislative body with the mayor presiding at meetings and voting only in the event of a tie. The mayor can veto ordinances subject to an override by a two-thirds majority vote of the council. The mayor makes committee and liaison assignments for council members, and most appointments are made by the mayor with the advice and consent of the council.

As of 2025, the mayor of Shrewsbury Borough is Republican Kimberly Eulner, who was appointed to serve a term of office ending December 31, 2026. Members of the Borough Council are Council President Donald J. Eddy (R, 2027), James Daly (R, 2026), Deidre M. DerAsadourian (R, 2025), Brendan Gilmartin (R, 2026), Daniel Levy (R, 2027) and Jason Sena (R, 2025).

In January 2024, Kimberly Eulner was sworn in as mayor for the team ending December 2026 that became vacant after mayor Erik Anderson stepped down to take office on the Monmouth County Board of County Commissioners. Eulner will serve on an interim basis until the November 2024 general election, when voters will choose a candidate to serve the balance of the two years remaining on Anderson's term of office.

The borough council appointed Jaclyn Woehnker in February 2022 to fill the seat expiring in December 2023 that had been held by Kimberly Eulner until she stepped down from office in December 2021 to take office in the New Jersey General Assembly. Woehnker will serve on an interim basis until the November 2022 general election, when voters will choose a candidate to serve the remainder of the term of office.

In February 2016, the borough council selected Erik Anderson to fill the seat expiring in December 2017 that had been held by William E. Dodge until his resignation earlier that month.

=== Federal, state and county representation ===
Shrewsbury Borough is located in the 4th Congressional District and is part of New Jersey's 11th state legislative district.

For the 119th United States Congress, New Jersey's 4th congressional district is represented by Chris Smith (R, Manchester Township). New Jersey is represented in the United States Senate by Democrats Cory Booker (Newark, term ends 2027) and Andy Kim (Moorestown, term ends 2031).

For the 2026–2027 session, the 11th legislative district of the New Jersey Legislature is represented in the New Jersey Senate by Vin Gopal (D, Long Branch) and in the General Assembly by Margie Donlon (D, Ocean Township) and Luanne Peterpaul (D, Long Branch).

Monmouth County is governed by a Board of County Commissioners composed of five members who are elected at-large to serve three-year terms of office on a staggered basis, with either one or two seats up for election each year as part of the November general election. At an annual reorganization meeting held in the beginning of January, the board selects one of its members to serve as director and another as deputy director.

As of 2025, Monmouth County's Commissioners are Director Thomas A. Arnone (R, Neptune City, 2025), Susan M. Kiley (R, Hazlet Township, 2027), Erik Anderson (R, Shrewsbury, 2026), Nick DiRocco (R, Wall Township, 2025), and Deputy Director Ross F. Licitra (R, Marlboro Township, 2026).

Constitutional officers elected on a countywide basis are Clerk Christine Giordano Hanlon (R, 2025; Ocean Township), Sheriff Shaun Golden (R, 2025; Howell Township) and Surrogate Rosemarie D. Peters (R, 2026; Middletown Township).

=== Politics ===
United States presidential election results for Shrewsbury Borough
| Year | Republican | | Democratic | | Third party(ies) | |
| Year | No. | % | No. | % | No. | % |
|---|---|---|---|---|---|---|
| 2024 | 1,302 | 48.71% | 1,333 | 49.87% | 38 | 1.42% |
| 2020 | 1,343 | 47.29% | 1,463 | 51.51% | 34 | 1.20% |
| 2016 | 1,234 | 52.22% | 1,041 | 44.05% | 88 | 3.72% |
| 2012 | 1,205 | 57.16% | 876 | 41.56% | 27 | 1.28% |
| 2008 | 1,248 | 55.27% | 980 | 43.40% | 30 | 1.33% |
| 2004 | 1,305 | 58.94% | 891 | 40.24% | 18 | 0.81% |
| 2000 | 1,004 | 54.30% | 776 | 41.97% | 69 | 3.73% |
| 1996 | 833 | 51.17% | 658 | 40.42% | 137 | 8.42% |
| 1992 | 917 | 52.10% | 565 | 32.10% | 278 | 15.80% |

As of March 2011, there were a total of 2,844 registered voters in Shrewsbury, of whom 650 (22.9%) were registered as Democrats, 863 (30.3%) were registered as Republicans and 1,330 (46.8%) were registered as Unaffiliated. There as one voter registered to another party.

In the 2012 presidential election, Republican Mitt Romney received 57.2% of the vote (1,205 cast), ahead of Democrat Barack Obama with 41.6% (876 votes), and other candidates with 1.3% (27 votes), among the 2,120 ballots cast by the borough's 2,935 registered voters (12 ballots were spoiled), for a turnout of 72.2%. In the 2008 presidential election, Republican John McCain received 54.5% of the vote (1,248 cast), ahead of Democrat Barack Obama with 42.8% (980 votes) and other candidates with 1.3% (30 votes), among the 2,291 ballots cast by the borough's 2,944 registered voters, for a turnout of 77.8%. In the 2004 presidential election, Republican George W. Bush received 58.9% of the vote (1,305 ballots cast), outpolling Democrat John Kerry with 40.2% (891 votes) and other candidates with 0.6% (18 votes), among the 2,217 ballots cast by the township's 2,834 registered voters, for a turnout percentage of 78.2.

Gubernatorial election results for Shrewsbury
| Year | Republican | | Democratic | | Third party(ies) | |
| Year | No. | % | No. | % | No. | % |
|---|---|---|---|---|---|---|
| 2025 | 1,130 | 49.71% | 1,129 | 49.67% | 14 | 0.62% |
| 2021 | 1,105 | 56.21% | 851 | 43.29% | 10 | 0.51% |
| 2017 | 960 | 57.07% | 702 | 41.74% | 20 | 1.19% |
| 2013 | 955 | 72.51% | 348 | 26.42% | 14 | 1.06% |
| 2009 | 1,036 | 65.12% | 404 | 25.39% | 151 | 9.49% |
| 2005 | 869 | 57.93% | 583 | 38.87% | 48 | 3.20% |

In the 2013 gubernatorial election, Republican Chris Christie received 72.5% of the vote (955 cast), ahead of Democrat Barbara Buono with 26.4% (348 votes), and other candidates with 1.1% (14 votes), among the 1,330 ballots cast by the borough's 3,000 registered voters (13 ballots were spoiled), for a turnout of 44.3%. In the 2009 gubernatorial election, Republican Chris Christie received 65.3% of the vote (1,063 ballots cast), ahead of Democrat Jon Corzine with 24.8% (404 votes), Independent Chris Daggett with 8.3% (135 votes) and other candidates with 0.9% (14 votes), among the 1,628 ballots cast by the borough's 2,885 registered voters, yielding a 56.4% turnout.

United States Senate election results for Shrewsbury1
| Year | Republican | | Democratic | | Third party(ies) | |
| Year | No. | % | No. | % | No. | % |
|---|---|---|---|---|---|---|
| 2024 | 1,329 | 51.29% | 1,232 | 47.55% | 30 | 1.16% |
| 2018 | 1,192 | 57.28% | 827 | 39.74% | 62 | 2.98% |
| 2012 | 1,251 | 61.96% | 740 | 36.65% | 28 | 1.39% |
| 2006 | 820 | 56.98% | 586 | 40.72% | 33 | 2.29% |

United States Senate election results for Shrewsbury2
| Year | Republican | | Democratic | | Third party(ies) | |
| Year | No. | % | No. | % | No. | % |
|---|---|---|---|---|---|---|
| 2020 | 1,436 | 50.92% | 1,352 | 47.94% | 32 | 1.13% |
| 2014 | 689 | 58.24% | 476 | 40.24% | 18 | 1.52% |
| 2013 | 460 | 53.36% | 396 | 45.94% | 6 | 0.70% |
| 2008 | 1,264 | 59.62% | 818 | 38.58% | 38 | 1.79% |

== Historic district ==
- Shrewsbury Historic District
- U.S. National Register of Historic Places
- U.S. Historic district
- New Jersey Register of Historic Places
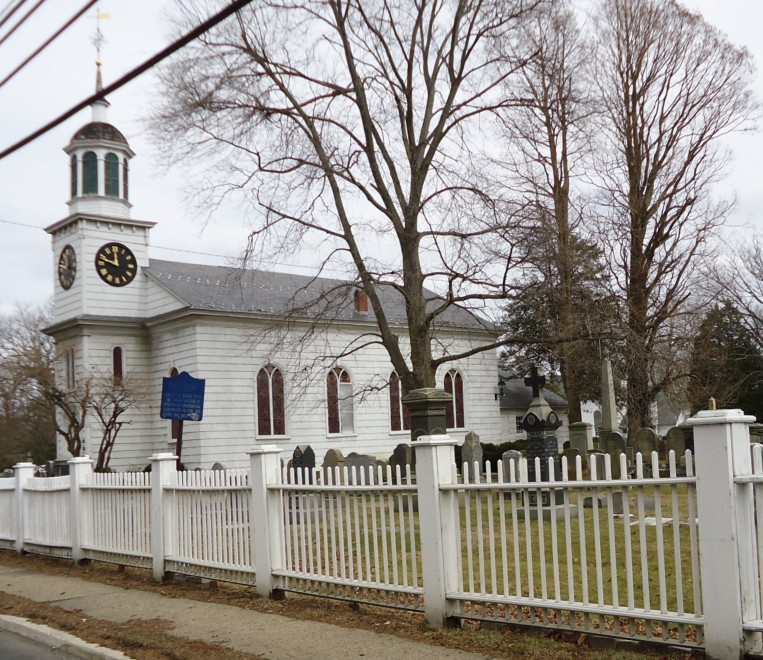
- Christ Church along Route 35
- Location: Route 35 (Broad Street) and County Route 13A (Sycamore Avenue)
- Area: 85 acres (34 ha)
- Architectural style: Queen Anne, Dutch Colonial
- NRHP reference No.: 78001779
- NJRHP No.: 2055

Significant dates
- Added to NRHP: July 17, 1978
- Designated NJRHP: May 7, 1976

The Shrewsbury Historic District is a historic district located at the intersection of Route 35 (Broad Street) and County Route 13A (Sycamore Avenue). The village was an important transportation artery during colonial times.

The district was added to the National Register of Historic Places on July 17, 1978, for its significance in architecture and religion. Three churches, the Allen House, and the Wardell House are among its 47 contributing buildings.

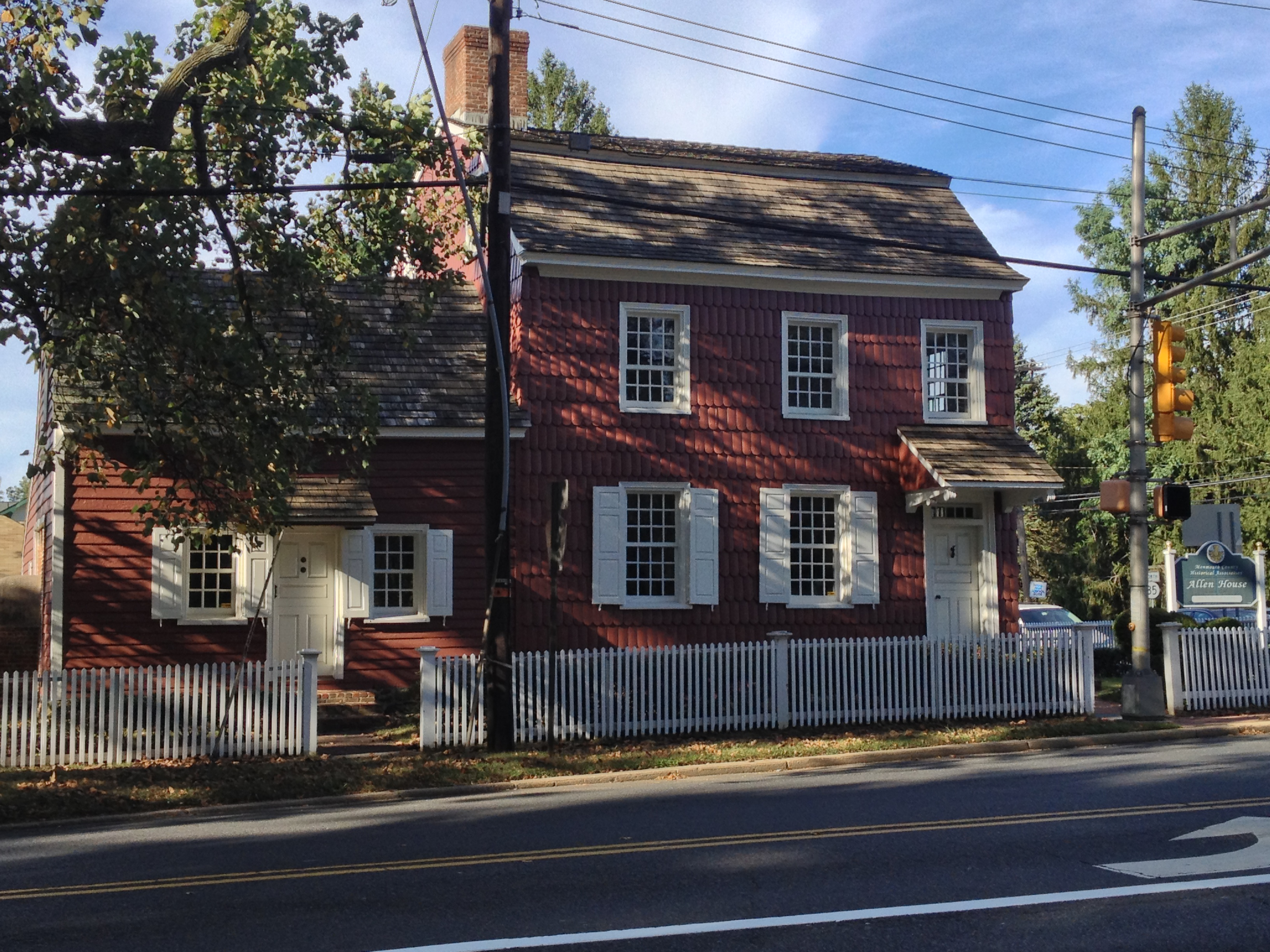
Allen House

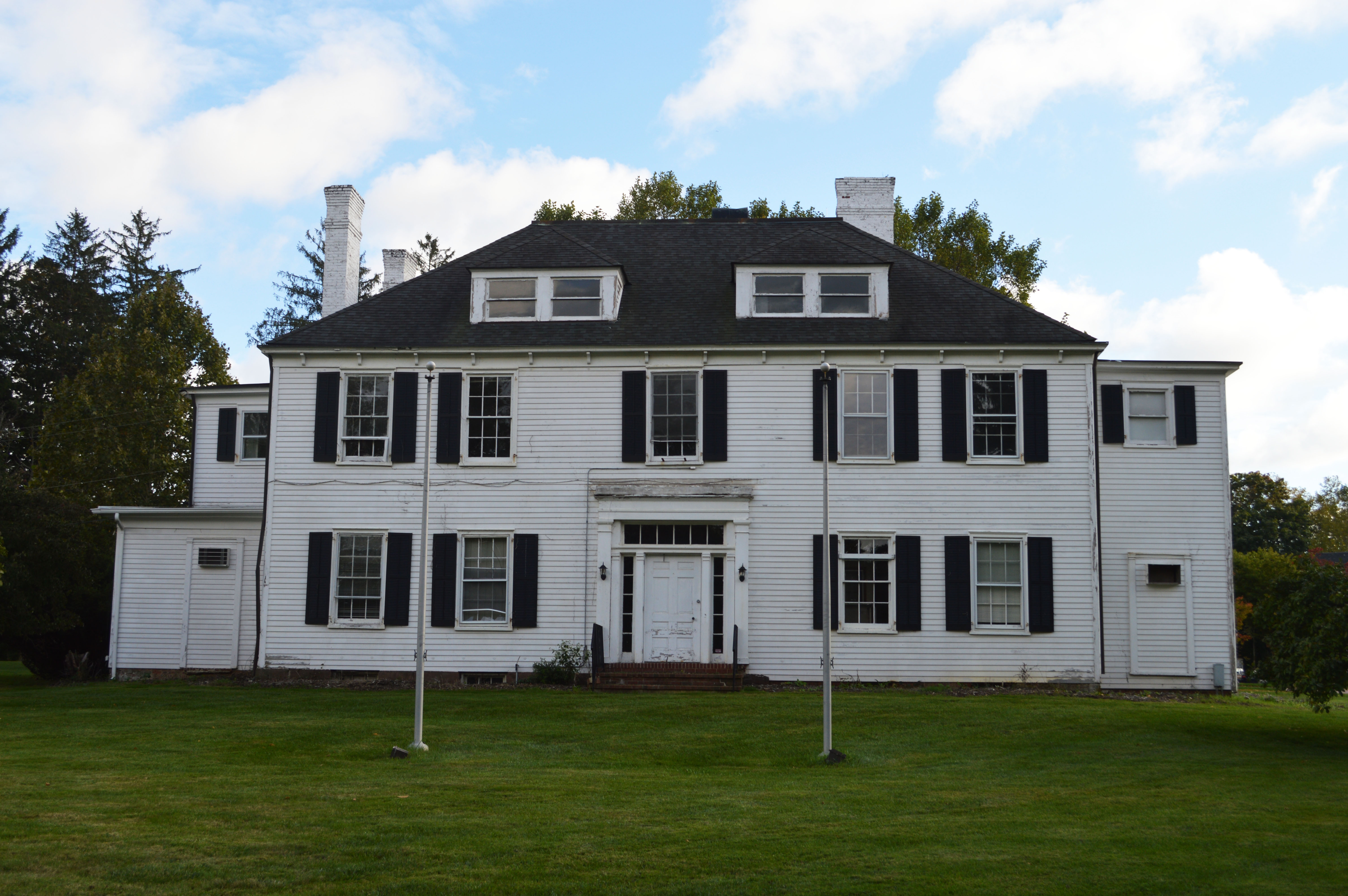
Wardell House

== Education ==
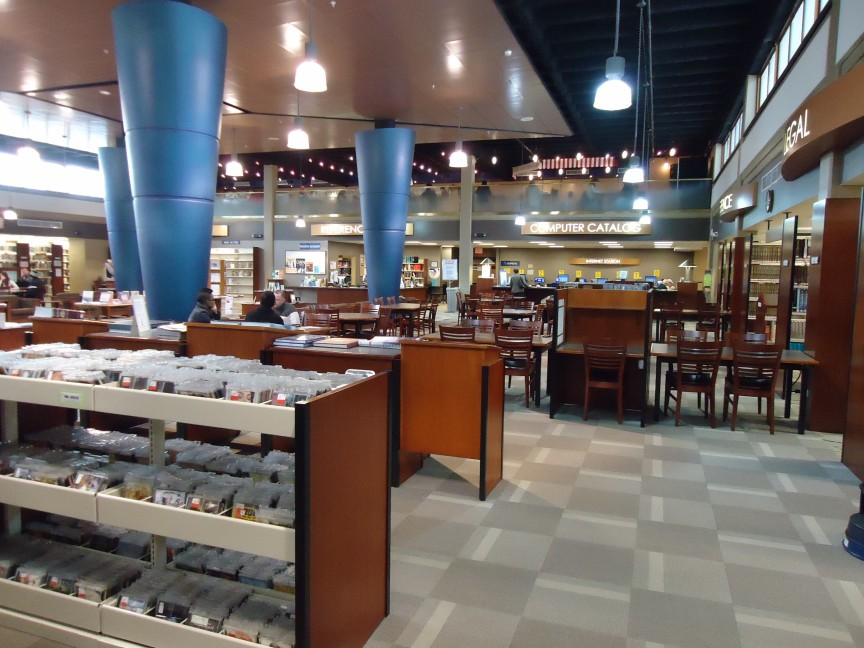
The Monmouth County Library is in Shrewsbury.

The Shrewsbury Borough School District serves public school students ranging from pre-kindergarten through eighth grade at the Shrewsbury Borough School. As of the 2024–25 school year, the district, comprised of one school, had an enrollment of 443 students and 52.0 classroom teachers (on an FTE basis), for a student–teacher ratio of 8.5:1. The school features three homerooms per grade, with special classes that include physical education, art, music, computers, and for language, Spanish.

For ninth through twelfth grades, most public school students are assigned to attend Red Bank Regional High School, which also serves students from the boroughs of Little Silver and Red Bank, along with students in the district's academy programs from other communities who are eligible to attend on a tuition basis. Students from other Monmouth County municipalities are eligible to attend the high school for its performing arts program, with admission on a competitive basis. The borough has two elected representatives on the nine-member board of education. As of the 2024–25 school year, the high school had an enrollment of 1,261 students and 124.8 classroom teachers (on an FTE basis), for a student–teacher ratio of 10.1:1.

Private school options include Christian Brothers Academy or Red Bank Catholic High School, the local Catholic schools, operated by the Roman Catholic Diocese of Trenton.

== Transportation ==
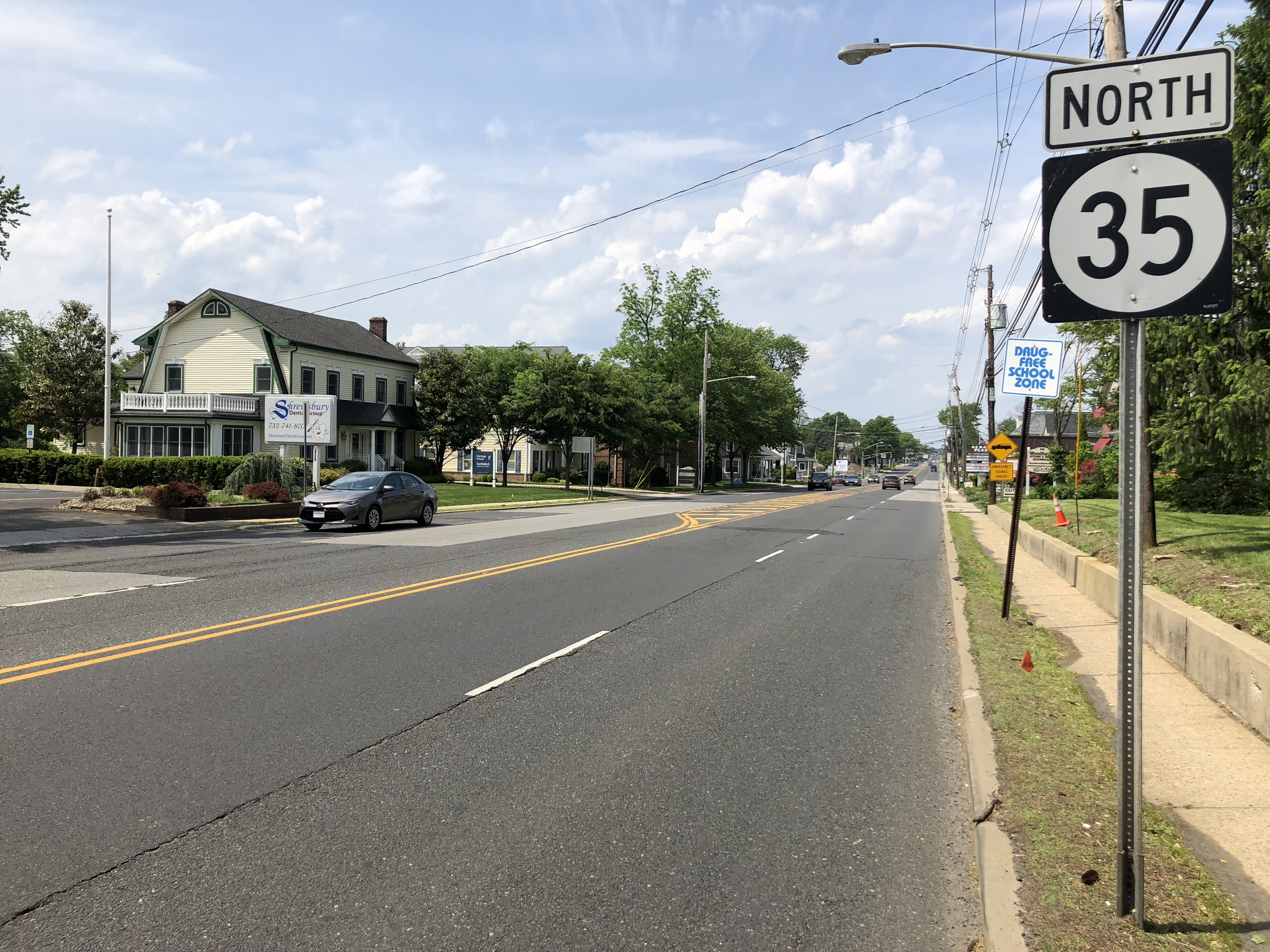
Route 35 in Shrewsbury

=== Roads and highways ===
As of May 2010, the borough had a total of 21.50 miles (34.60 km) of roadways, of which 16.88 miles (27.17 km) were maintained by the municipality, 2.75 miles (4.43 km) by Monmouth County and 1.87 miles (3.01 km) by the New Jersey Department of Transportation.

Route 35 is the main north–south road in Shrewsbury, while County Route 520 is oriented east–west along the northern border.

The Garden State Parkway is accessible in neighboring Tinton Falls or via County Route 520 in Middletown Township.

=== Public transportation ===
NJ Transit offers train service at the Little Silver station. Commuter service is provided on the North Jersey Coast Line, offering express and local service. Diesel service operates from Hoboken Terminal to Bay Head station. Electric service operates from New York Penn Station to Long Branch station, where the electrified portion of the line ends. Mid-line stops include Newark Penn Station, Newark Liberty International Airport Station and Secaucus Junction.

NJ Transit local bus service is available on the 831 and 832 routes.

== Notable people ==
People who were born in, residents of, or otherwise closely associated with Shrewsbury include:

- Alfred N. Beadleston (1912–2000), politician who served as Speaker of the New Jersey General Assembly and President of the New Jersey Senate, after serving as mayor of Shrewsbury
- Alisyn Camerota (born 1966), anchor of CNN's morning show New Day and a former news anchor for Fox News Channel
- Kimberly Eulner (born 1966), mayor of Shrewsbury who represented the 11th Legislative district in the New Jersey General Assembly from 2022 to 2024
- Joe Jacques (born 1995), pitcher who has played for the Boston Red Sox and Arizona Diamondbacks.
- Jake Kalish (born 1991), professional baseball pitcher
- Ryan Kalish (born 1988), outfielder with the Chicago Cubs
- John Eatton Le Conte (1784–1860), naturalist and a member of one of America's most important early families devoted to science
- Richard Lippincott (1615–1683), English Quaker and an early settler in Shrewsbury
- Greg Montgomery (1964–2020), former National Football League punter from 1988–1997, who played for the Houston Oilers, Detroit Lions and Baltimore Ravens
- Michael J. Panter (born 1969), who represented the 12th Legislative District in the New Jersey General Assembly from 2006 to 2008
- John Lloyd Stephens (1805–1852), explorer, writer, and diplomat, who was a pivotal figure in the rediscovery of Maya civilization throughout Middle America and in the planning of the Panama railway
