= Monmouth Park station =

NJ Transit rail station

Monmouth Park
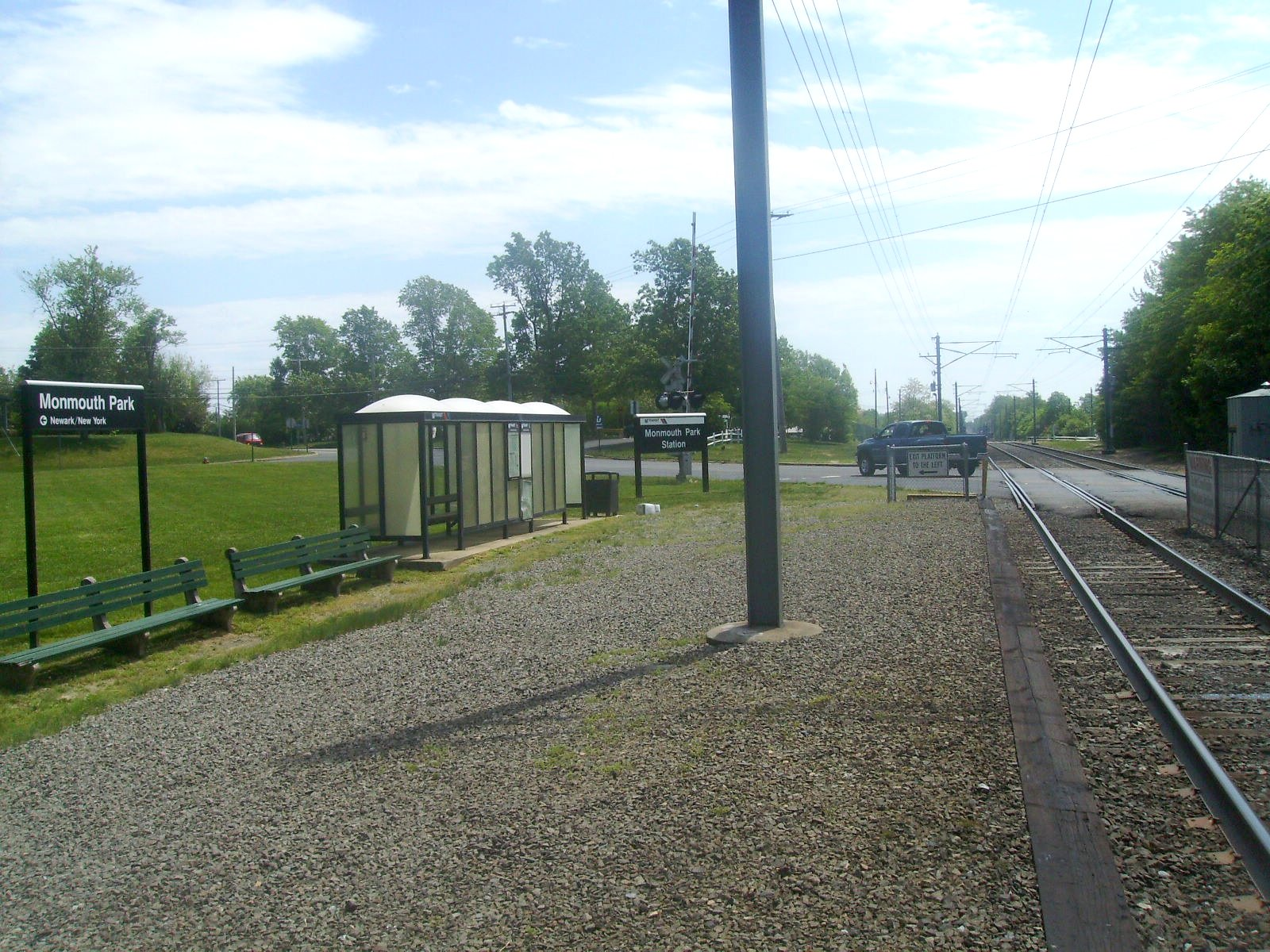
- Monmouth Park station in 2010.

General information
- Location: Port-Au-Peck Avenue near Myrtle Avenue; Oceanport, New Jersey 07757
- Coordinates: 40°18′48.53″N 74°0′54.13″W
- Owner: NJ Transit
- Platforms: 2 gravel side platforms
- Tracks: 2

Construction
- Parking: No
- Cycle facilities: No
- Accessible: No

Other information
- Fare zone: 19

History
- Electrified: 1988

Services
Preceding station	NJ Transit	Following station
Long Branch toward Bay Head	North Jersey Coast Line special event service	Little Silver toward New York
Former services
Preceding station	New York and Long Branch Railroad	Following station
Branchport toward Bay Head Junction	Main Line	Little Silver toward Perth Amboy
Location

Monmouth Park is a seasonal NJ Transit commuter rail station on the North Jersey Coast Line, located in Oceanport, New Jersey, and serving the current Monmouth Park Racetrack. The first two locations of Monmouth Park were inside now-closed Fort Monmouth. Both those locations had dedicated rail sidings owned by The Monmouth Park Railroad.

Railway service to the current Monmouth Park began in 1946. There were two stations: a diesel-only terminal station, and an electric-compatible station. The diesel-only stop was where the special Pony Express service terminated until the end of the 2005 racing season. That terminal station was located inside the racetrack's property accessed by a dedicated siding off the current NJ Transit rail line. That service was discontinued, afterward, so this area is no longer used as a train station (since filled over). During the 2007 Breeders' Cup World Championships, the area where the single-track station is located served as a hospitality center/entrance.

The mainline electrified station is located approximately 1/4 mile (0.40 km) from the track's entrance on Port-Au-Peck Avenue. This station is served at least once an hour from approximately 10:30 a.m. until approximately 7 p.m. on Fridays and race days during the racing season.

== Station layout ==
The station has two low-level gravel surfaced side platforms serving trains in both directions. The northbound platform features bus shelter style protection from the elements along with some benches. The southbound platform features just benches. There are no ticket machines at this station.
