= The Grove at Shrewsbury =

- The Grove East in November, 2025
- Location: Shrewsbury, New Jersey, USA
- Coordinates: 40.3319°N 74.0612°W
- Opened: 1988
- Developer: Metrovation
- Manager: Metrovation
- Owner: Metrovation
- Num. of stores: 40
- Num. of anchor tenants: 5: Brooks Brothers, Anthropologie, J. Crew, Williams Sonoma and Banana Republic
- Floor area: 150,000 sq ft (14,000 m^{2})
- Floors: 1
- Parking: Parking lot
- Public transit: NJ Transit bus: 831, 832
- Website: www.thegroveatshrewsbury.com

The Grove at Shrewsbury is an upscale lifestyle center located on Route 35 in Shrewsbury, New Jersey, United States, 1 mile (1.6 km) south of Red Bank. The center opened in 1988 and has a gross leasable area of 150,000 sq ft (14,000 m^{2}). A lifestyle center is a shopping center or mixed-use commercial development that combines the traditional retail functions of a shopping mall but with leisure amenities oriented towards upscale consumers. The Grove at Shrewsbury was developed and is managed by Metrovation.

The Grove West

The center contains 40 stores and is anchored by Brooks Brothers, Anthropologie, Williams Sonoma, J. Crew and Banana Republic.

== History ==
The Grove at Shrewsbury, New Jersey's first lifestyle center, opened in March 1989. The first major store was Epstein's. By August, 37 of the 40 units were occupied. Epstein's would later close; Sealfon's, another upscale, regional New Jersey department store, opened in its place in 1994. That store also went out of business. The space was eventually subdivided and in its place opened a flagship Brooks Brothers and Anthropologie, Monmouth County's first.

Peloton opened a store in 2021.

Victoria's Secret and Pink closed in 2020. Eddie Bauer closed in January 2019.
