= Monmouth County Historical Association =

Organization in New Jersey

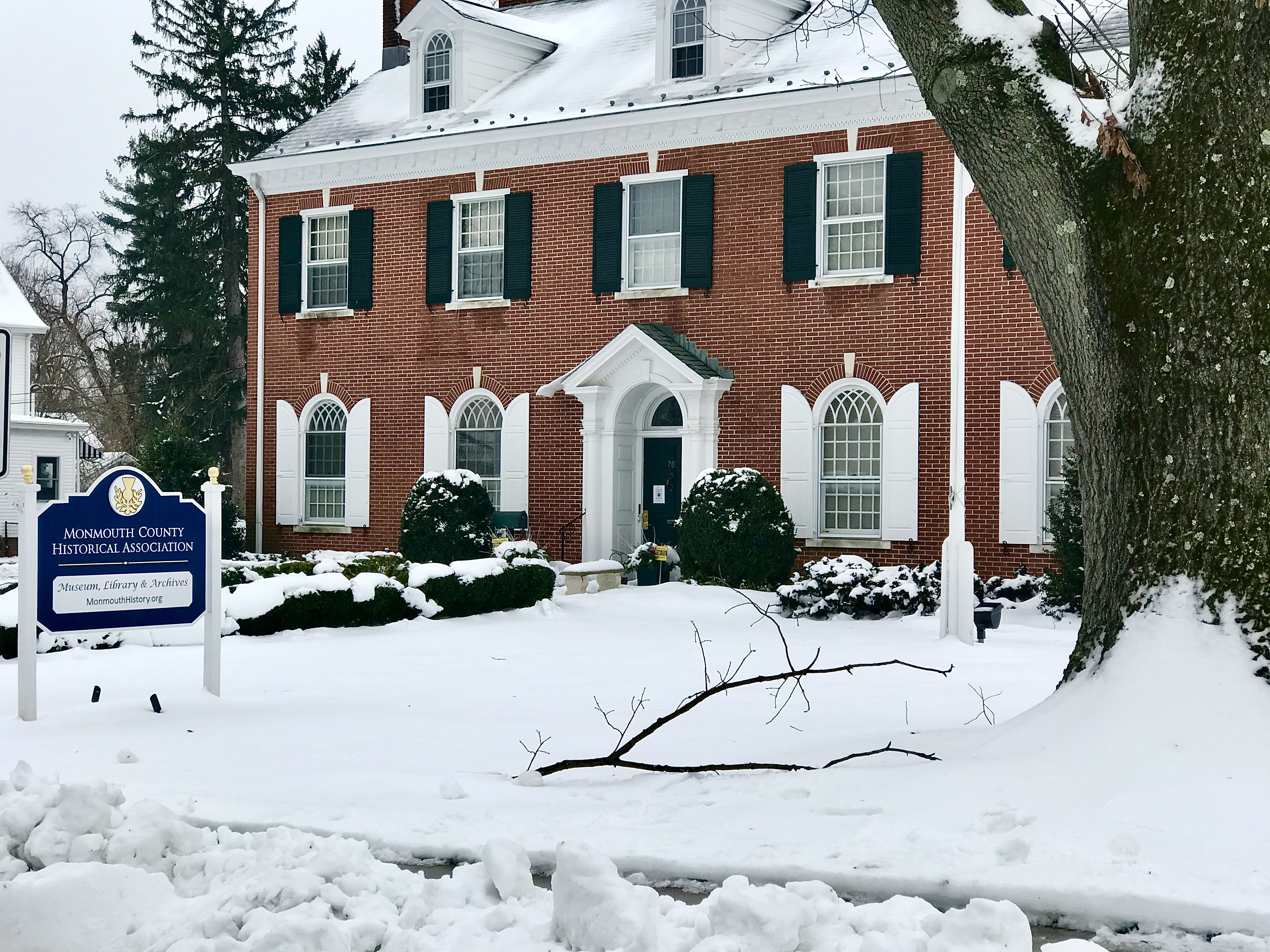
The Monmouth County Historical Association's headquarters are located in Freehold Borough, built in the Georgian architectural style.

The Monmouth County Historical Association was established in 1898 by a group of county residents headed by professional educator Caroline Gallup Reed. They soon incorporated in order “to discover, procure, preserve and perpetuate whatever relates to the history of Monmouth County.” In 1931, the present Museum and Library, a brick Georgian-style building designed by architect J. Hallam Conover, was constructed in Freehold, the county seat of Monmouth County, New Jersey. The enthusiasm generated by the announcement of a new headquarters brought in numerous contributions of furniture, artifacts, paintings, rare documents and books.

== Historic properties ==
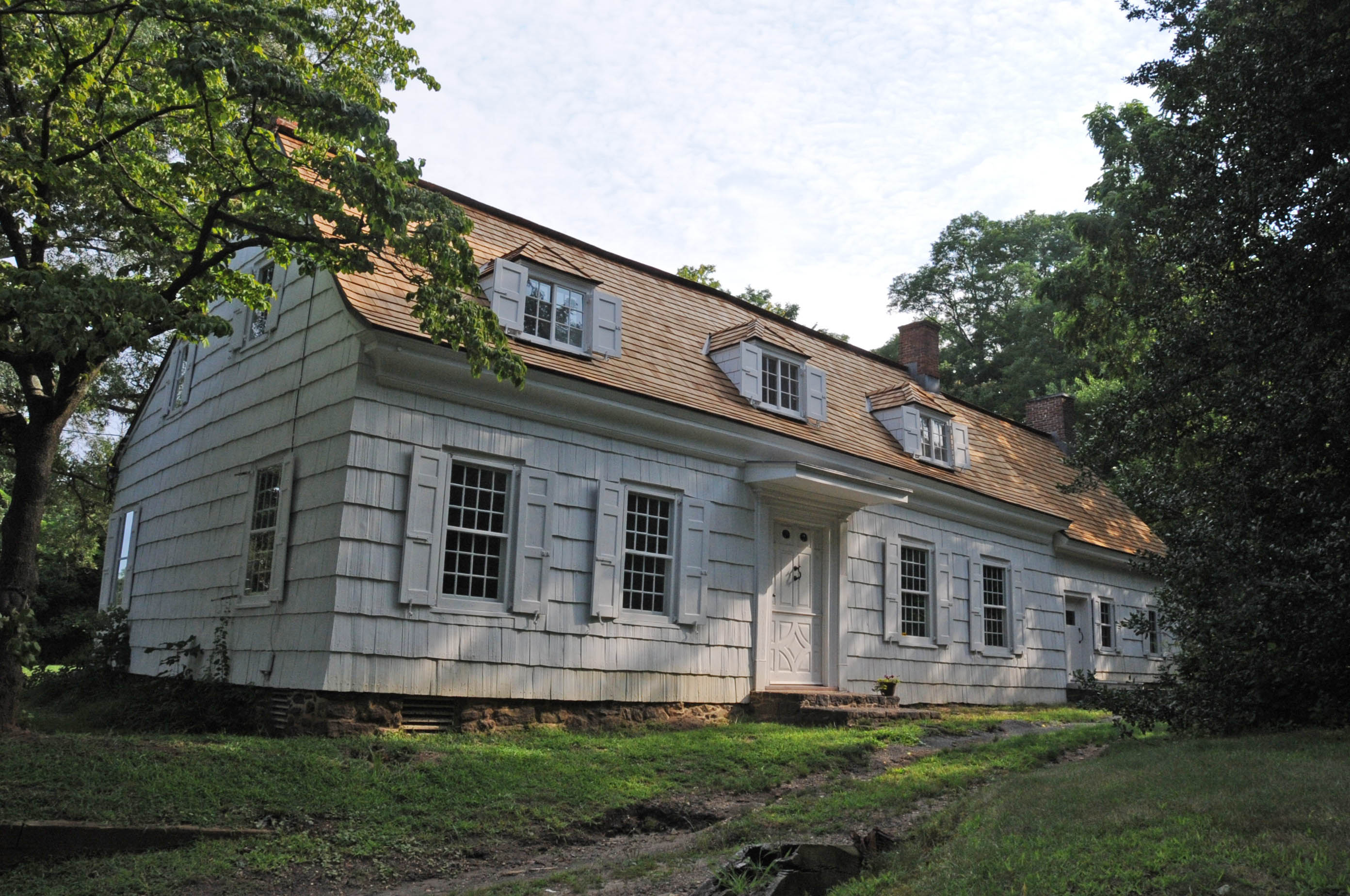
Marlpit Hall in Middletown, built in the saltbox architectural style.

In 1936, the MCHA expanded its mission to include the preservation of historic properties. In that year, the first of five historic properties came to the MCHA when Mrs. J. Amory Haskell purchased, restored and furnished Marlpit Hall (circa 1756) in Middletown, and then presented it to the organization. In 1959, the Holmes-Hendrickson House (circa 1754) was given to the MCHA by Bell Laboratories and moved two miles to its present site in Holmdel.

During the 1960s, the MCHA acquired and restored two more of Monmouth County's most historically significant buildings. In 1966, the Covenhoven House (circa 1752) in Freehold, which served as British General Sir Henry Clinton's headquarters before the Battle of Monmouth, was acquired; and in 1968, the Allen House (circa 1705) in Shrewsbury, which is interpreted to reflect its late 18th-century use as a tavern, became an MCHA property. These four historic properties, furnished with the MCHA's decorative arts collections to reflect life in the 18th century, are open to the public seasonally as historic house museums. In 1999, the MCHA acquired an important example of the Victorian style, the Taylor-Butler House (circa 1853), built by later generations of the Taylor family of Marlpit Hall, which is on the adjoining property.

== Education ==
The Monmouth County Historical Association is recognized as one of the country's leading local history organizations and remains committed to making its museum and research collections accessible to the public through publication, educational programs, outreach activities and an annual changing and permanent exhibition program. The MCHA's main Museum and Library building in Freehold, New Jersey is open throughout the year and its historic sites are open seasonally from May through September. Nearly 8,000 school children participate in school programs each year presented at the museum, the historic houses and in outreach programs given in classrooms throughout the area.

== Publications ==
- The Diary of Sarah Tabitha Reid, 1868-1873 (2001)
- Steamboats in Monmouth County: A Gazetteer by Megan E. Springate (2003)
- Documents in the Classroom: The World War II Home Front in New Jersey compiled by Denise Lubrano (2007)

== Collections ==
The Museum collections are displayed in changing exhibitions at the museum and furnish the historic homes. They include furniture and other decorative arts, costumes and textiles, ceramics, portraits and paintings, folk art and military objects.

The Library and Archives house over 200,000 documents pertaining to the area and its residents, in addition to comprehensive collections of genealogies, reference books, photographs, and local newspapers. Some of the more widely used collections include Coll. 1 Peter Vredenburgh (1837-1864) Papers, 1856-1868, Coll. 5 North American Phalanx Records, 1841-1972, Coll. 42 John C. Mills Maritime Collection, 1870s-1970s, Coll. 51 A & M Karagheusian, Inc. Collection, 1940-1962, Coll. 72 Battle of Monmouth Collection, and Coll. 466 Pach Brothers Photographers Glass Plate Negatives Collection.

On October 27, 2022, the Asbury Park Press reported that the Board of Trustees of the Monmouth County Historical Association is considering selling “Washington Rallying the Troops at Monmouth,” the painting by Emanuel Gottlieb Leutze.

== See also ==
- Parker Homestead
- National Register of Historic Places listings in Monmouth County, New Jersey
- List of the oldest buildings in New Jersey
- List of historical societies in New Jersey
- List of museums in New Jersey
- Freehold Public Library
