= Little Silver station =

NJ Transit rail station

Little Silver
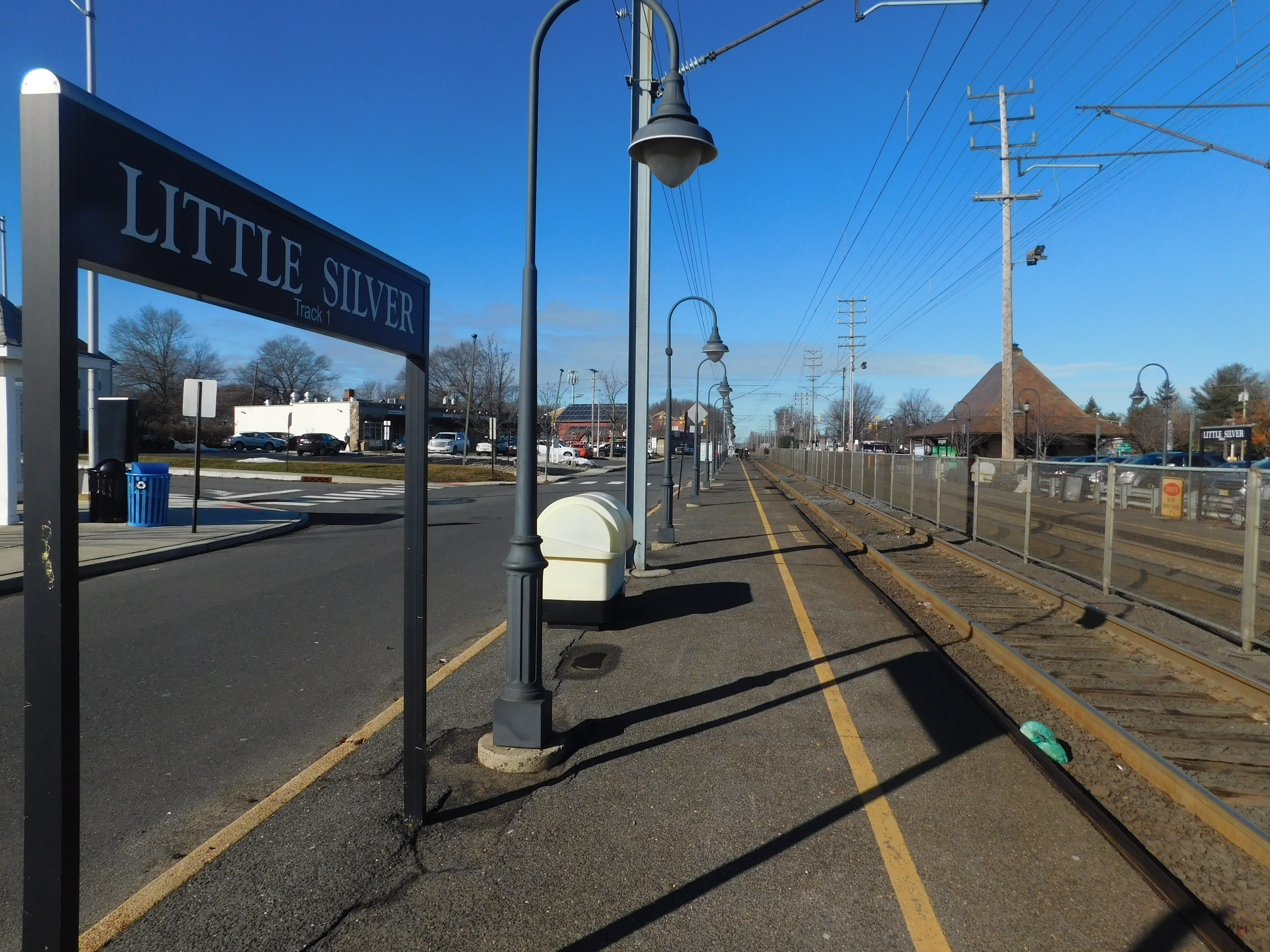
- Little Silver station in January 2018.

General information
- Location: Oceanport (CR 11) and Sycamore Avenues (CR 13A) at Ayers Lane, Little Silver, New Jersey 07739
- Owner: NJ Transit
- Line: North Jersey Coast Line
- Platforms: 2 side platforms
- Tracks: 2
- Connections: Academy Bus

Construction
- Parking: Yes
- Cycle facilities: Yes
- Accessible: No

Other information
- Fare zone: 19

History
- Opened: June 25, 1875 (ceremonial); July 1, 1875 (regular service)
- Rebuilt: 1890, 2003
- Former names: Shrewsbury (June 1875–May 1877)

Passengers
- 2025: 413 (average weekday)
- Rank: 69 of 153

Services
| Preceding station | NJ Transit | Following station |
|---|---|---|
| Monmouth Park toward Bay Head | North Jersey Coast Line special event service | Red Bank toward New York |
| Long Branch toward Bay Head | North Jersey Coast Line | Red Bank toward New York |
Former services
| Preceding station | New York and Long Branch Railroad | Following station |
|---|---|---|
| Monmouth Park toward Bay Head Junction | Main Line | Red Bank toward Perth Amboy |
- Little Silver Station
- U.S. National Register of Historic Places
- New Jersey Register of Historic Places
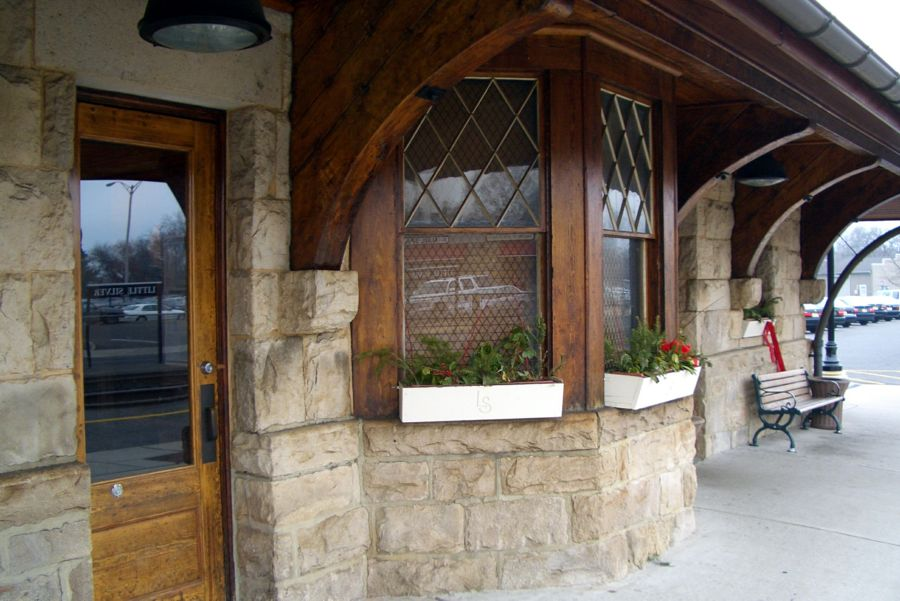
- The former ticket booth at Little Silver station
- Interactive map of Little Silver Station
- Location: Little Silver, NJ
- Coordinates: 40°19′35.27″N 74°2′25.22″W
- Area: 0.2 acres (0.1 ha)
- Built: 1890
- Architect: H. H. Richardson
- Architectural style: Richardson Romanesque
- MPS: Operating Passenger Railroad Stations TR
- NRHP reference No.: 84002754
- NJRHP No.: 1999

Significant dates
- Added to NRHP: June 22, 1984
- Designated NJRHP: March 17, 1984
Location

Little Silver is a railway station in Little Silver, Monmouth County, New Jersey, United States. It is served by trains on NJ Transit's North Jersey Coast Line. The station is located in between two grade crossings, and trains can back up traffic when they stop at the station.

== History ==
The station was originally built in 1875 by the New York and Long Branch Railroad which was acquired by the Central Railroad of New Jersey. On June 30, 1882, the community became the site of an accident in which 5 of the 7 cars of the NY&LB's Lightning Express train plunged off a trestle bridge, killing 1 man outright, with 2 men dying of their injuries later. Former President Ulysses S. Grant was among the survivors of the accident. The original station house was replaced by the existing station, which was designed by the noted American architect Henry Hobson Richardson prior to his death in 1886, and opened in 1890. The head house has been on the state and federal registers of historic places since 1984 listed as part of the Operating Passenger Railroad Stations Thematic Resource. The station exterior is constructed of sandstone with a slate roof, while the interior features rough wood paneling. It was renovated from 2001 to 2003 with Mark Fitzsimmons as the architect.

== Station layout ==
The station has two low-level asphalt side platforms.

== See also ==
- List of New Jersey Transit stations
- National Register of Historic Places listings in Monmouth County, New Jersey
