= Richard Lippincott (Loyalist) =

American-born military officer (1745–1826)

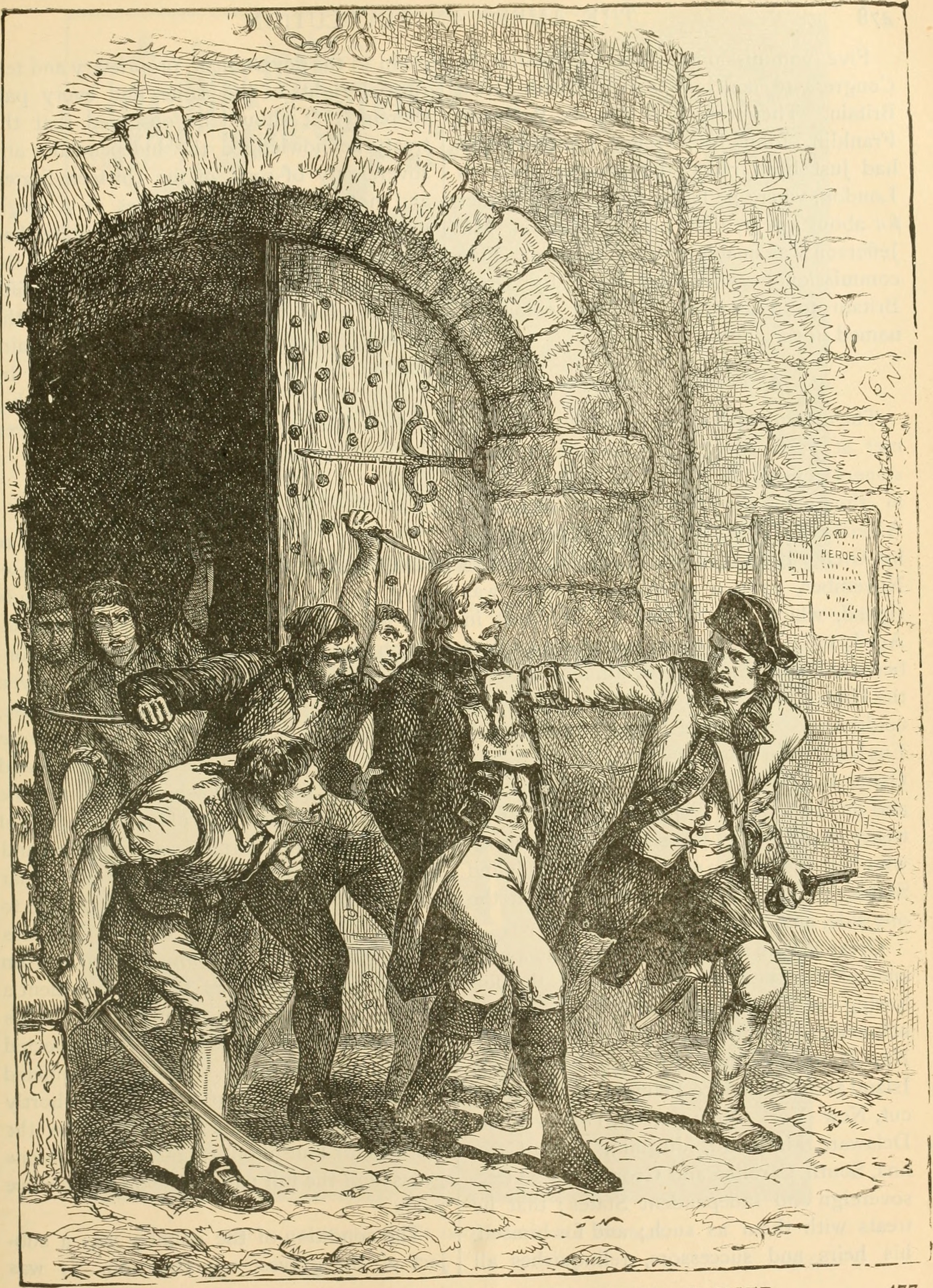
- Lippincott leading Joshua Huddy to be hanged
- Born: January 2, 1745; Shrewsbury, New Jersey
- Died: May 14, 1826 (aged 81); York, Upper Canada
- Burial place: Weston, Ontario
- Military career
- Allegiance: Great Britain
- Branch: Provincial Corps
- Rank: Captain
- Unit: New Jersey Volunteers

Captain Richard Lippincott (January 2, 1745 – May 14, 1826) was an American-born military officer who served in the New Jersey Volunteers during the American War of Independence. He is best known for his role in the Asgill Affair, in which Lippincott led a Loyalist mob which summarily executed Captain Joshua Huddy, a captive New Jersey Militia officer, in retaliation for similar murders of Loyalists, provoking an international incident. Lippincott was born on January 2, 1745 in Shrewsbury, New Jersey into a family which had resided in the Thirteen Colonies for generations. On March 4, 1770, he married Esther Borden, a woman from Bordentown, New Jersey.

After the outbreak of the American War of Independence in 1775, Lippincott sided with the Loyalist camp and was captured and imprisoned by Patriots at the municipal jail in Burlington, New Jersey. In 1776, he escaped from the jail and made his way to Staten Island, which was under British control. Lippincott subsequently joined the New Jersey Volunteers, a Provincial Corps unit which fought alongside the British Army. The New Jersey Volunteers was an irregular Loyalist regiment which frequently conducted guerilla operations behind American lines.

In 1782, Lippincott's brother-in-law, Philip White, was dragged from his home by a group of Patriots, who made him run a gauntlet before killing him. When White's body was found, there were more signs of torture on his corpse along with signs of mutilation; his legs had been broken, one of his eyes had been gouged out, and one of his arms was missing. Enraged, Lippincott led a group of Loyalists which removed Huddy from British custody and hanged him, pinning a note to Huddy's corpse which stated that his execution was in retaliation for White's death.

In response to Huddy's death, General George Washington, the commander-in-chief of the Continental Army, demanded his British counterpart Sir Henry Clinton court-martial Lippincott. At Lippincott's court-martial, his defence successfully argued that as an irregular, he was technically a civilian, and as such was subject to civilian law instead of military law. Chief Justice William Smith ruled that he did not have jurisdiction to try Lippincott since the incident occurred in an area outside effective British control.

Lippincott was not convicted, but "Clinton was forced to hold Lippincott in custody for the duration of the war to prevent Washington from exacting his revenge on an officer in Lord Cornwallis' captive army." After conferring with his officers, Washington determined a course of retaliation was called for. On his orders, Captain Charles Asgill, who had been taken prisoner at the 1781 siege of Yorktown, was selected by drawing straws to be executed in retaliation for Huddy's death. Washington relented and spared Asgill only after pressure was applied on the Americans by the French.

During the British evacuation of New York in 1783, Lippincott went first to Nova Scotia and subsequently to Upper Canada, where he received a grant of 3,000 acres (1,200 hectares) in Vaughn Township. In 1806 he went to live with his newly married daughter, Esther, and her husband George Taylor Denison in York, Upper Canada. On May 14, 1826, he died and was buried in modern-day Weston, Ontario. Lippincott Street in Toronto is named in his honor.

== Sources ==
- Humphreys, David (1859). The conduct of General Washington : respecting the confinement of Capt. Asgill, placed in its true point of light. New York: Printed for the Holland Club; Collection Library_of_Congress.
- "Memorial Tiles: Capt. Richard Lippincott". The United Empire Loyalists Association of Canada.
