= Little Silver, New Jersey =

Borough in Monmouth County, New Jersey, US

- Borough
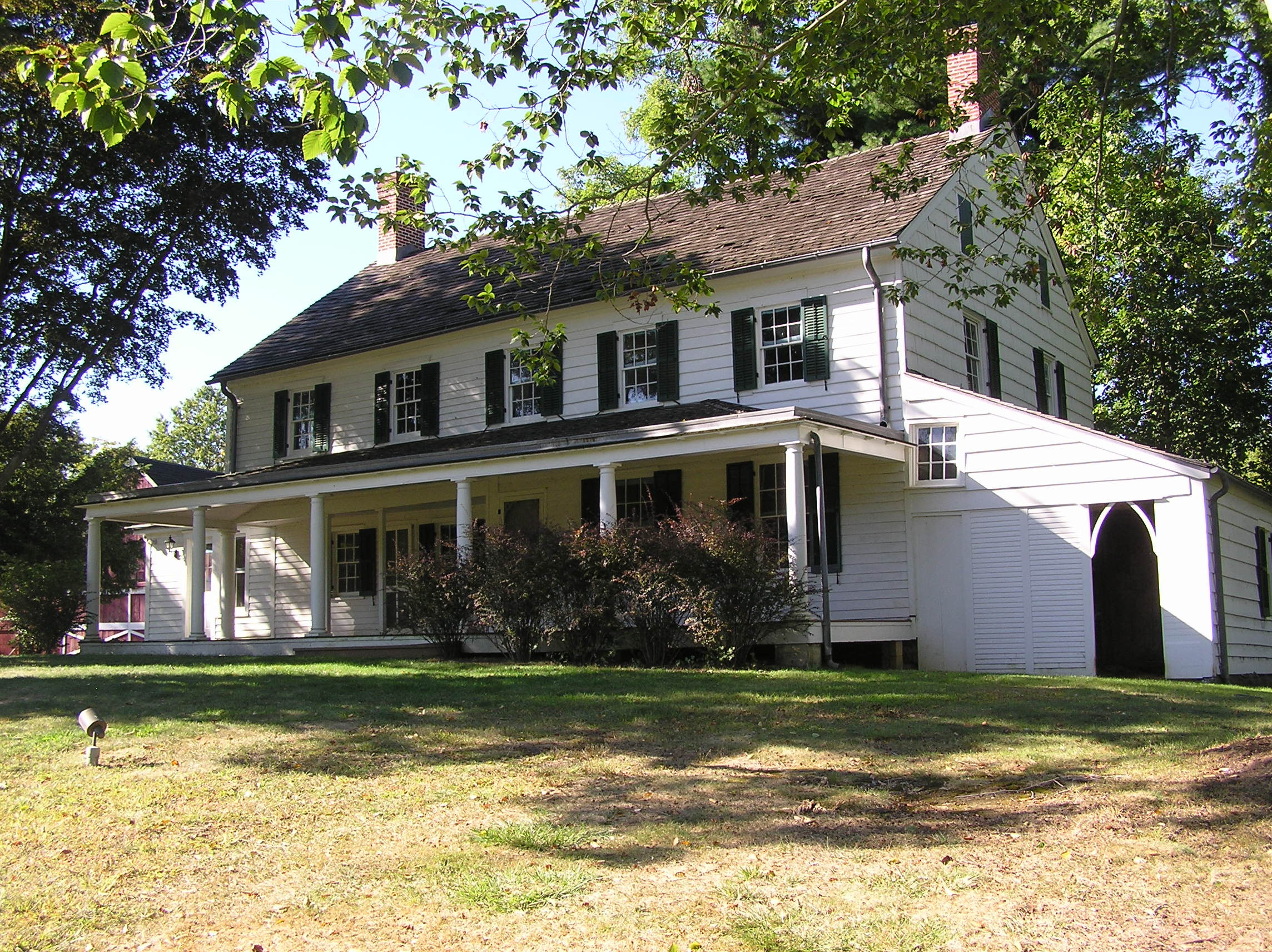
- Parker Homestead

- Map of Little Silver in Monmouth County. Inset: Location of Monmouth County highlighted in the State of New Jersey.

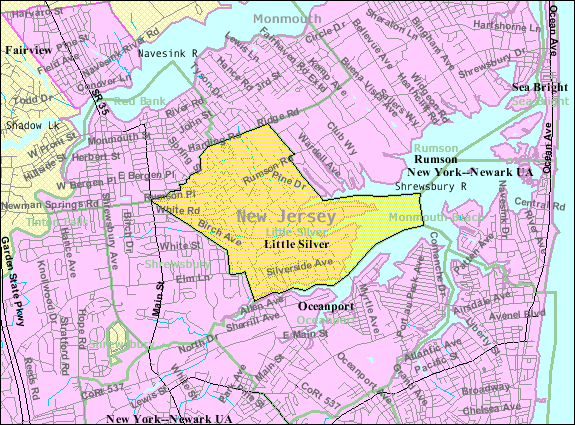
- Census Bureau map of Little Silver, New Jersey

- Location in Monmouth County Location in New Jersey Location in the United States
- Coordinates: 40.336952°N 74.034535°W
- Country: United States
- State: New Jersey
- County: Monmouth
- Incorporated: April 28, 1923

Government
  - Type: Borough
  - Body: Borough Council
  - Mayor: Christopher M. Faherty (R, term ends December 31, 2027)
  - Administrator / Municipal clerk: Kevin Burke

Area
  - Total: 3.32 sq mi (8.60 km^{2})
  - Land: 2.71 sq mi (7.02 km^{2})
  - Water: 0.61 sq mi (1.57 km^{2}) 18.28%
  - Rank: 323rd of 565 in state 22nd of 53 in county
- Elevation: 16 ft (4.9 m)

Population (2020)
  - Total: 6,131
  - Estimate (2023): 6,053
  - Rank: 343rd of 565 in state 28th of 53 in county
  - Density: 2,260.7/sq mi (872.9/km^{2})
  - Rank: 276th of 565 in state 33rd of 53 in county
- Time zone: UTC−05:00 (Eastern (EST))
  - Summer (DST): UTC−04:00 (Eastern (EDT))
- ZIP Code: 07739
- Area code: 732
- FIPS code: 3402540770
- GNIS feature ID: 0885282
- Website: www.littlesilvernj.gov

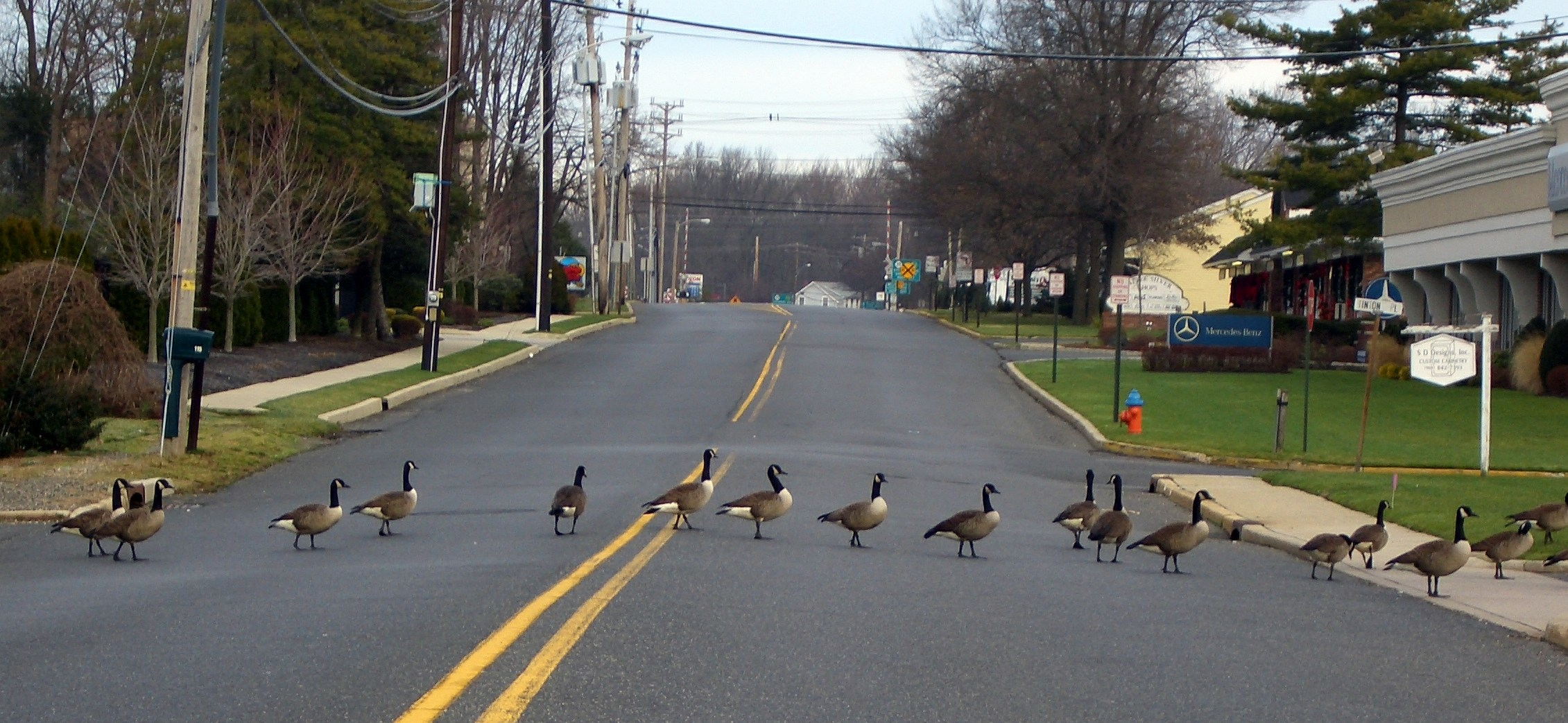
Canada Geese cross street in Little Silver, New Jersey

Little Silver is a borough in Monmouth County, in the U.S. state of New Jersey. As of the 2020 United States census, the borough's population was 6,131, an increase of 181 (+3.0%) from the 2010 census count of 5,950, which in turn reflected a drop of 220 (−3.6%) from the 6,170 counted in the 2000 census.

Little Silver was established with a King's land grant in 1663 and settled in 1667. Little Silver was incorporated as a borough by an act of the New Jersey Legislature on March 19, 1923, from portions of Shrewsbury Township, based on the results of a referendum held on April 28, 1923.

== History ==
Prior to the settlement of Europeans, the area that is now Little Silver was inhabited by the Navesink Native Americans.

There are several tales of how Little Silver received its name. In one, brothers Joseph and Peter Parker, who settled in this area in 1667 and owned land bounded by Parker's Creek on the south and Little Silver Creek on the north, named their holdings "Little Silver" after their father's (George Parker) estate in Portsmouth, Rhode Island. The original Parker Homestead, dating to 1725 and one of the state's oldest, was acquired by the borough and is undergoing renovation.

Other explanations for the derivation of the name are the payment to Native Americans for purchase of the land and the placid appearance of the water.

The borough's earliest European residents were primarily farmers, fishermen and merchants.

Early families included:

- Parkers – Joseph and Peter Parker originally settled the area, and their original homestead at 235 Rumson Road has been declared a state historic site.
- Sickles – Harold and Elsie Sickles acquired land and opened a wholesale truck farm in 1908. The land was acquired from Harold's mother who was related to the Parkers. Transitioning from seasonal to year-round in 1998, Sickles Market became a specialty garden and food market until it closed in March 2024 after 116 years.
- Lovett – John T. Lovett owned a nursery that once covered almost half the borough, supplying large catalog houses such as Sears Roebuck, Macy's and Newberry's. In 1878 he circulated a petition to the community recommending that the name be revised and on July 30, 1879, the Post Office name was changed from "Parkersville" to "Little Silver".

The borough has had a varied history as a resort, agricultural area and fishing town. Today, the municipality is primarily residential with a range of housing types, from ranches and capes.

Little Silver separated from Shrewsbury Township in 1923. Since then, farms and nurseries have been replaced by housing. Over the years, New York City and North Jersey commuters have made Little Silver their home, traveling by rail or auto to their jobs. The Little Silver train station on Sycamore Avenue was designed by the noted American architect Henry Hobson Richardson and built in 1890. It reopened after renovations in 2003.

== Geography ==
According to the United States Census Bureau, the borough had a total area of 3.32 square miles (8.60 km^{2}), including 2.71 square miles (7.02 km^{2}) of land and 0.61 square miles (1.57 km^{2}) of water (18.28%).

The original farms and nurseries have almost all been replaced by housing today. Little Silver's location on the Shrewsbury River makes it a popular destination for boaters and water sports enthusiasts, with a public boat ramp at the Dominick F. Santelle Park off Riverview Avenue. Approximately 8% of the homes are directly on the Shrewsbury River and another third of homes are on streams that connect to it.

The borough borders the Monmouth County boroughs of Fair Haven, Monmouth Beach, Oceanport, Red Bank, Rumson and Shrewsbury.

Little Silver Point is an unincorporated community located within Little Silver.

== Demographics ==
Historical population
Census	Pop.	Note	%±
1930	1,109		—
1940	1,461		31.7%
1950	2,595		77.6%
1960	5,202		100.5%
1970	6,010		15.5%
1980	5,548		−7.7%
1990	5,721		3.1%
2000	6,170		7.8%
2010	5,950		−3.6%
2020	6,131		3.0%
2023 (est.)	6,053	▼	−1.3%
Population sources:1930 1940–2000 2000; 2010 2020

=== 2020 census ===
As of the 2020 census, Little Silver had a population of 6,131. The median age was 45.0 years. 25.2% of residents were under the age of 18 and 20.1% of residents were 65 years of age or older. For every 100 females there were 92.9 males, and for every 100 females age 18 and over there were 90.5 males age 18 and over.

100.0% of residents lived in urban areas, while 0.0% lived in rural areas.

There were 2,196 households in Little Silver, of which 38.7% had children under the age of 18 living in them. Of all households, 68.2% were married-couple households, 7.4% were households with a male householder and no spouse or partner present, and 21.6% were households with a female householder and no spouse or partner present. About 17.9% of all households were made up of individuals and 12.1% had someone living alone who was 65 years of age or older.

There were 2,323 housing units, of which 5.5% were vacant. The homeowner vacancy rate was 1.0% and the rental vacancy rate was 6.7%.

Racial composition as of the 2020 census
Race	Number	Percent
White	5,583	91.1%
Black or African American	25	0.4%
American Indian and Alaska Native	3	0.0%
Asian	141	2.3%
Native Hawaiian and Other Pacific Islander	1	0.0%
Some other race	39	0.6%
Two or more races	339	5.5%
Hispanic or Latino (of any race)	261	4.3%

=== 2010 census ===
The 2010 United States census counted 5,950 people, 2,146 households, and 1,689 families in the borough. The population density was 2,197.3 per square mile (848.4/km^{2}). There were 2,278 housing units at an average density of 841.3 per square mile (324.8/km^{2}). The racial makeup was 96.42% (5,737) White, 0.29% (17) Black or African American, 0.10% (6) Native American, 1.75% (104) Asian, 0.13% (8) Pacific Islander, 0.17% (10) from other races, and 1.14% (68) from two or more races. Hispanic or Latino of any race were 3.01% (179) of the population.

Of the 2,146 households, 37.3% had children under the age of 18; 68.4% were married couples living together; 8.2% had a female householder with no husband present and 21.3% were non-families. Of all households, 18.5% were made up of individuals and 10.4% had someone living alone who was 65 years of age or older. The average household size was 2.77 and the average family size was 3.18.

27.9% of the population were under the age of 18, 5.1% from 18 to 24, 19.0% from 25 to 44, 32.3% from 45 to 64, and 15.8% who were 65 years of age or older. The median age was 43.8 years. For every 100 females, the population had 92.1 males. For every 100 females ages 18 and older there were 85.4 males.

The Census Bureau's 2006–2010 American Community Survey showed that (in 2010 inflation-adjusted dollars) median household income was $144,299 (with a margin of error of +/− $23,666) and the median family income was $167,659 (+/− $28,090). Males had a median income of $126,556 (+/− $27,434) versus $71,667 (+/− $13,832) for females. The per capita income for the borough was $66,069 (+/− $8,285). About 1.7% of families and 2.1% of the population were below the poverty line, including 0.7% of those under age 18 and 1.7% of those age 65 or over.

=== 2000 census ===
As of the 2000 United States census, there were 6,170 people, 2,232 households, and 1,810 families residing in the borough. The population density was 2,226.2 inhabitants per square mile (859.5/km^{2}). There were 2,288 housing units at an average density of 825.5 per square mile (318.7/km^{2}). The racial makeup of the borough was 97.15% White, 0.31% African American, 0.16% Native American, 1.51% Asian, 0.02% Pacific Islander, 0.19% from other races, and 0.66% from two or more races. Hispanic or Latino of any race were 1.31% of the population.

There were 2,232 households, out of which 37.9% had children under the age of 18 living with them, 72.5% were married couples living together, 7.0% had a female householder with no husband present, and 18.9% were non-families. 16.8% of all households were made up of individuals, and 8.4% had someone living alone who was 65 years of age or older. The average household size was 2.76 and the average family size was 3.13.

In the borough the population was spread out, with 27.4% under the age of 18, 4.2% from 18 to 24, 25.0% from 25 to 44, 27.7% from 45 to 64, and 15.7% who were 65 years of age or older. The median age was 41 years. For every 100 females, there were 93.4 males. For every 100 females age 18 and over, there were 87.0 males.

The median income for a household in the borough was $94,094, and the median income for a family was $104,033. Males had a median income of $90,941 versus $45,938 for females. The per capita income for the borough was $46,798. About 0.4% of families and 0.8% of the population were below the poverty line, including none of those under age 18 and 0.8% of those age 65 or over.

== Government ==
=== Local government ===
Little Silver is governed under the borough form of New Jersey municipal government, which is used in 218 municipalities (of the 564) statewide, making it the most common form of government in New Jersey. The governing body is comprised of the mayor and the borough council, with all positions elected at-large on a partisan basis as part of the November general election. A mayor is elected directly by the voters to a four-year term of office. The borough council includes six members elected to serve three-year terms on a staggered basis, with two seats coming up for election each year in a three-year cycle. The borough form of government used by Little Silver is a "weak mayor / strong council" government in which council members act as the legislative body with the mayor presiding at meetings and voting only in the event of a tie. The mayor can veto ordinances subject to an override by a two-thirds majority vote of the council. The mayor makes committee and liaison assignments for council members and most appointments are made by the mayor with the advice and consent of the council.

As of 2026, the mayor of Little Silver is Republican Christopher M. Faherty who was chosen to fill the unexpired term of Robert C. Neff Jr. ending December 31, 2027. Members of the Borough Council are Kevin J. Brennan (R, 2026), Donald S. Galante (R, 2028), Elizabeth Giblin (R, 2028), Christian M. Smith (R, 2027) and Laurette Villardi (R, 2027).

In September 2024, the borough council selected Elizabeth Giblin to fill the seat expiring in December 2025 that had been vacated by Doug Christensen after he announced that he was moving out of the borough. Giblin served on an interim basis until the November 2025 general election, when she was elected to serve the remainder of the term of office.

In March 2016, the borough council selected Corinne Thygeson from three candidates nominated by the Republican municipal committee to fill the seat expiring in December 2016 that had been held by Stuart W. Van Winkle that became vacant upon his resignation; Thygeson served on an interim basis until the November 2016 general election, when voters selected her to fill the balance of the term.

In January 2015, the borough council selected Glenn Talavera to fill the vacant seat expiring December 2015 of Richard J. "Rick" Scott, who resigned from office due to work obligations.

In September 2011, following the death of mayor Suzanne Castleman in July 2011, Robert Neff was appointed to fill the vacant mayoral seat, while Donald Galante, a former member of the borough council, was appointed to fill Neff's vacant council seat.

=== Federal, state and county representation ===
Little Silver is located in the 6th Congressional District and is part of New Jersey's 13th state legislative district.

For the 119th United States Congress, New Jersey's 6th congressional district is represented by Frank Pallone (D, Long Branch). New Jersey is represented in the United States Senate by Democrats Cory Booker (Newark, term ends 2027) and Andy Kim (Moorestown, term ends 2031).

For the 2026–2027 session, the 13th legislative district of the New Jersey Legislature is represented in the New Jersey Senate by Declan O'Scanlon (R, Little Silver) and in the General Assembly by Vicky Flynn (R, Holmdel Township) and Gerard Scharfenberger (R, Middletown Township).

Monmouth County is governed by a Board of County Commissioners composed of five members who are elected at-large to serve three-year terms of office on a staggered basis, with either one or two seats up for election each year as part of the November general election. At an annual reorganization meeting held in the beginning of January, the board selects one of its members to serve as director and another as deputy director.

As of 2026, Monmouth County's Commissioners are Director Thomas A. Arnone (R, Neptune City, 2028),Deputy Director Nick DiRocco (R, Wall Township, 2028), Susan M. Kiley (R, Hazlet Township, 2027), Erik Anderson (R, Shrewsbury, 2026), and Ross F. Licitra (R, Marlboro Township, 2026).

Constitutional officers elected on a countywide basis are Clerk Christine Giordano Hanlon (R, 2030; Ocean Township), Sheriff Shaun Golden (R, 2028; Howell Township) and Surrogate Maureen Raisch (R, 2026; Middletown Township).

=== Politics ===
United States presidential election results for Little Silver
Year	Republican		Democratic		Third party(ies)	
Year	No.	%	No.	%	No.	%
2024	1,974	47.98%	2,071	50.34%	69	1.68%
2020	1,979	45.74%	2,280	52.69%	68	1.57%
2016	1,871	50.61%	1,696	45.88%	130	3.52%
2012	2,186	61.42%	1,344	37.76%	29	0.81%
2008	2,155	56.40%	1,625	42.53%	41	1.07%
2004	2,310	60.31%	1,501	39.19%	19	0.50%
2000	2,032	58.06%	1,326	37.89%	142	4.06%
1996	1,692	54.99%	1,180	38.35%	205	6.66%
1992	1,736	54.95%	1,019	32.26%	404	12.79%

As of March 2011, there were a total of 4,677 registered voters in Little Silver, of which 1,065 (22.8%) were registered as Democrats, 1,486 (31.8%) were registered as Republicans and 2,124 (45.4%) were registered as Unaffiliated. There were 2 voters registered as either Libertarians or Greens.

In the 2012 presidential election, Republican Mitt Romney received 61.4% of the vote (2,186 cast), ahead of Democrat Barack Obama with 37.8% (1,344 votes) and other candidates with 0.8% (29 votes), among the 3,574 ballots cast by the borough's 4,903 registered voters (15 ballots were spoiled), for a turnout of 72.9%. In the 2008 presidential election, Republican John McCain received 55.7% of the vote (2,155 cast), ahead of Democrat Barack Obama with 42.0% (1,625 votes) and other candidates with 1.1% (41 votes), among the 3,867 ballots cast by the borough's 4,879 registered voters, for a turnout of 79.3%. In the 2004 presidential election, Republican George W. Bush received 60.1% of the vote (2,310 ballots cast), outpolling Democrat John Kerry with 39.1% (1,501 votes) and other candidates with 0.4% (19 votes), among the 3,842 ballots cast by the borough's 4,752 registered voters, for a turnout percentage of 80.9.

Gubernatorial election results for Little Silver
Year	Republican		Democratic		Third party(ies)	
Year	No.	%	No.	%	No.	%
2025	1,789	51.10%	1,699	48.53%	13	0.37%
2021	1,676	55.50%	1,329	44.01%	15	0.50%
2017	1,449	58.47%	996	40.19%	33	1.33%
2013	1,639	74.33%	530	24.04%	36	1.63%
2009	1,865	67.70%	715	25.95%	175	6.35%
2005	1,572	59.34%	1,015	38.32%	62	2.34%

In the 2013 gubernatorial election, Republican Chris Christie received 74.3% of the vote (1,639 cast), ahead of Democrat Barbara Buono with 24.0% (530 votes) and other candidates with 1.6% (36 votes), among the 2,230 ballots cast by the borough's 4,837 registered voters (25 ballots were spoiled), for a turnout of 46.1%. In the 2009 gubernatorial election, Republican Chris Christie received 67.5% of the vote (1,865 ballots cast), ahead of Democrat Jon Corzine with 25.9% (715 votes), Independent Chris Daggett with 5.9% (163 votes) and other candidates with 0.4% (12 votes), among the 2,761 ballots cast by the borough's 4,752 registered voters, yielding a 58.1% turnout.

United States Senate election results for Little Silver1
Year	Republican		Democratic		Third party(ies)	
Year	No.	%	No.	%	No.	%
2024	2,010	50.30%	1,940	48.55%	46	1.15%
2018	1,823	56.44%	1,322	40.93%	85	2.63%
2012	2,202	64.33%	1,176	34.36%	45	1.31%
2006	1,567	60.62%	974	37.68%	44	1.70%

United States Senate election results for Little Silver2
Year	Republican		Democratic		Third party(ies)	
Year	No.	%	No.	%	No.	%
2020	2,199	51.04%	2,051	47.61%	58	1.35%
2014	1,208	60.01%	772	38.35%	33	1.64%
2013	877	55.86%	682	43.44%	11	0.70%
2008	2,203	61.02%	1,344	37.23%	63	1.75%

== Education ==
The Little Silver School District serves students in pre-kindergarten through eighth grade. As of the 2021–22 school year, the district, comprised of two schools, had an enrollment of 776 students and 77.8 classroom teachers (on an FTE basis), for a student–teacher ratio of 10.0:1. Schools in the district (with 2021–22 enrollment data from the National Center for Education Statistics) are Point Road School with 393 students in grades PreK-4 and Markham Place School with 380 students in grades 5-8.

For ninth through twelfth grades, students attend Red Bank Regional High School, which serves students from the boroughs of Little Silver, Red Bank and Shrewsbury, along with students in the district's academy programs from other communities who are eligible to attend on a tuition basis. Students from other Monmouth County municipalities are eligible to attend the high school for its performing arts program, with admission on a competitive basis. The borough has two elected representatives on the nine-member board of education. As of the 2021–22 school year, the high school had an enrollment of 1,247 students and 117.8 classroom teachers (on an FTE basis), for a student–teacher ratio of 10.6:1.

== Transportation ==
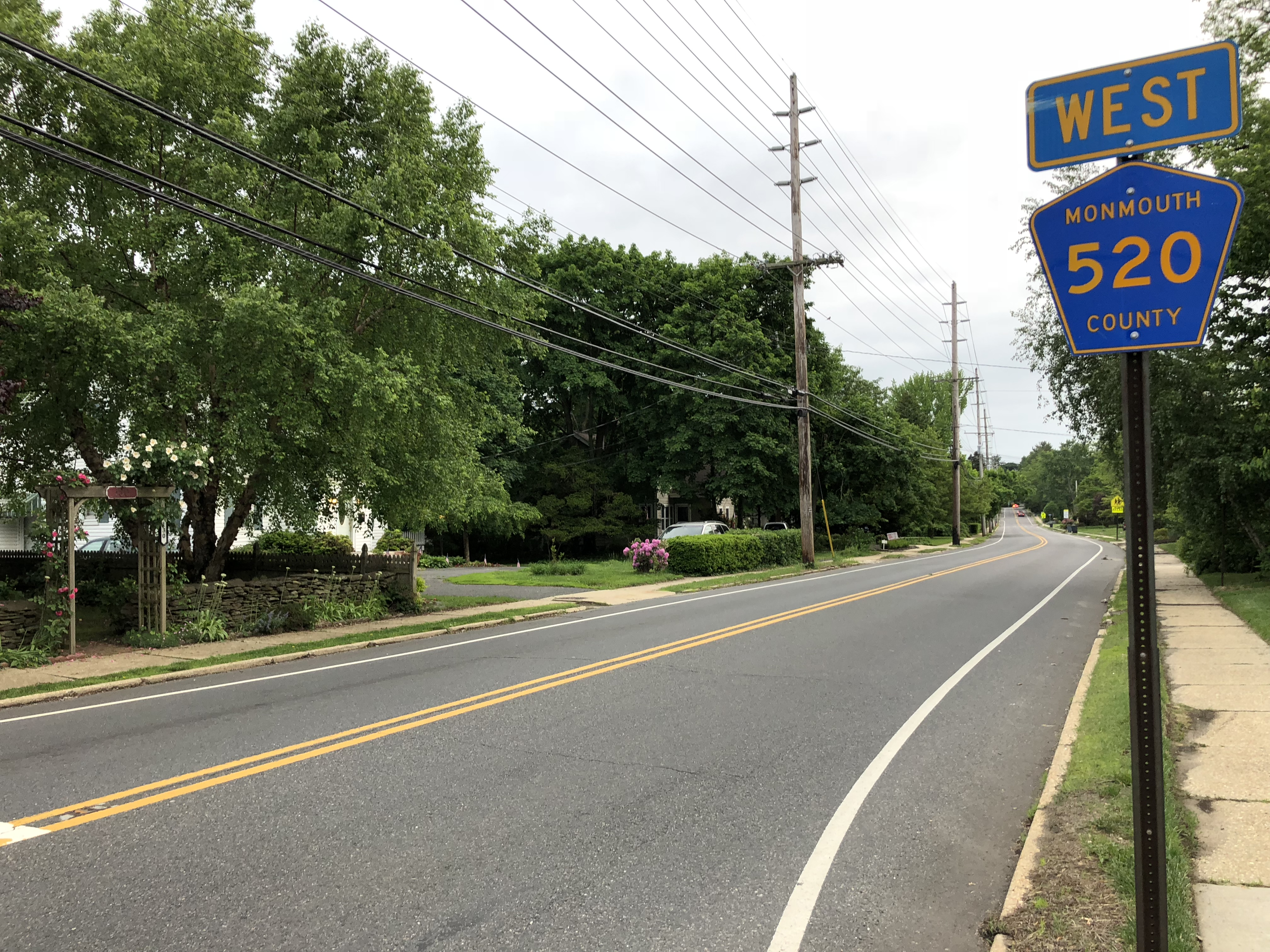
County Route 520 through Little Silver

=== Roads and highways ===
As of May 2010, the borough had a total of 32.41 miles (52.16 km) of roadways, of which 25.68 miles (41.33 km) were maintained by the municipality and 6.73 miles (10.83 km) by Monmouth County.

County Route 520 passes through the heart of the borough. The closest limited access road is the Garden State Parkway via CR 520 in Middletown.

=== Public transportation ===
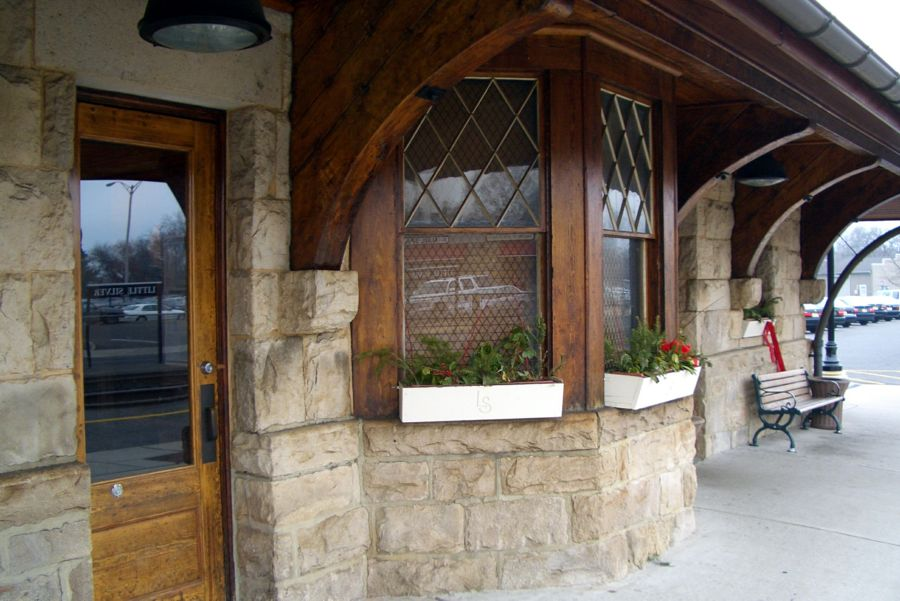
Little Silver station agent's window

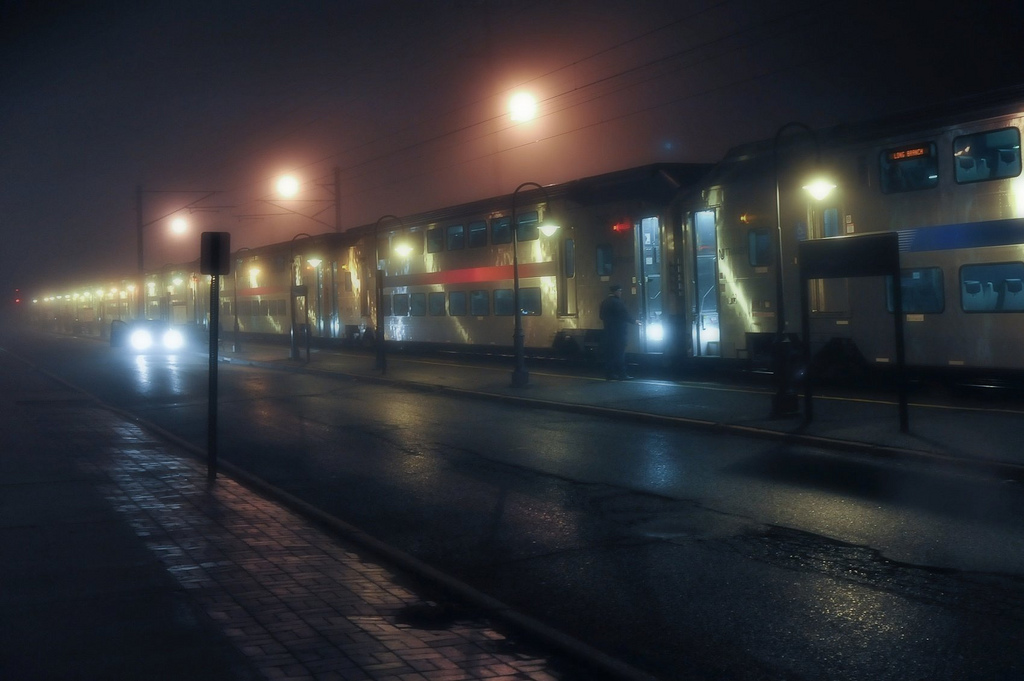
NJT train at Little Silver station

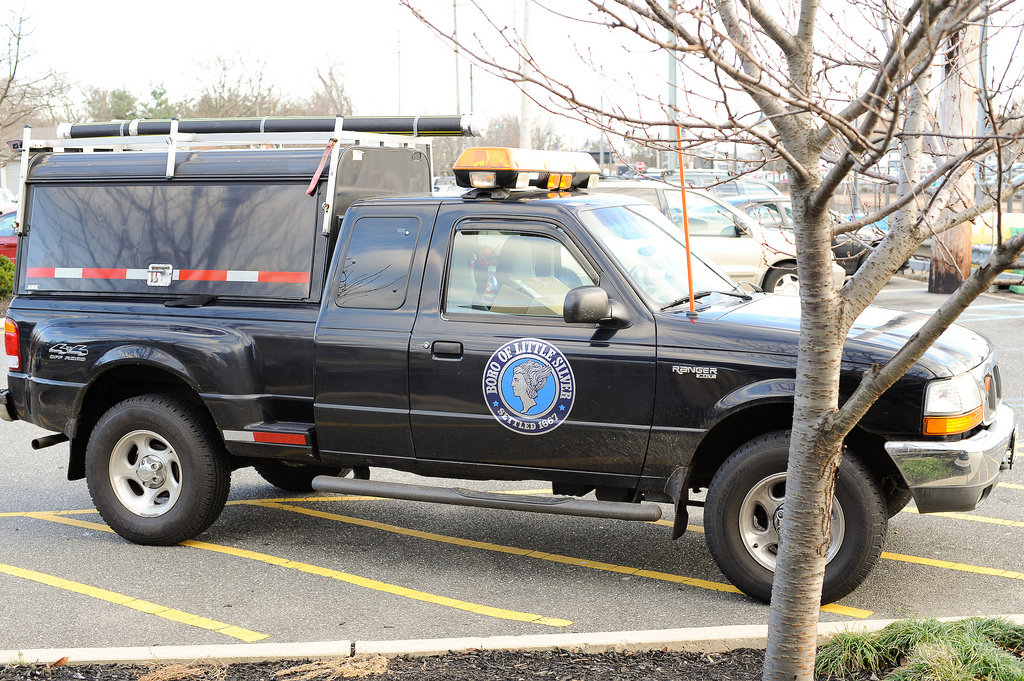
Borough of Little Silver vehicle

NJ Transit train service is available at the Little Silver station, which is one of the few on the electrified portion of the line without raised platforms. The station is located between two grade crossings. When trains stop at the station, they block the roadway at one crossing or the other for entire duration of the stop, causing traffic backups. Commuter service connects the borough to Hoboken Terminal, Newark Penn Station, Secaucus Junction and New York Penn Station on the North Jersey Coast Line. The train station, constructed in 1875 by the New York and Long Branch Railroad, was added to the National Register of Historic Places in 1984.

From the Raritan Bayshore SeaStreak catamarans travel to Pier 11 at Wall Street and East 34th Street Ferry Landing in Manhattan. NY Waterway ferries travel to Paulus Hook Ferry Terminal in Jersey City, Battery Park City Ferry Terminal and West Midtown Ferry Terminal in Manhattan.

== Notable people ==
People who were born in, residents of, or otherwise closely associated with Little Silver include:

- Chester Apy (1932–2021), politician who represented District 5B in the New Jersey General Assembly from 1968 to 1970 and again from 1972 to 1974
- James Avati (1912–2005), artist and illustrator of paperback covers
- Virginia Bauer (born 1956), advocate for families of the victims of the September 11 terror attacks who is a Commissioner of the Port Authority of New York and New Jersey
- John O. Bennett (born 1948), former assemblyman, state senator, Senate co-president and acting governor
- Dave Bry (1970–2017), writer, music journalist and editor at Vibe, Spin and XXL
- Brian Christian (born 1984), poet and nonfiction author
- Chris Gotterup (born 1999), PGA tour player
- Harold Hartshorne (1891–1961), gold medal winner in figure skating
- Karl Guthe Jansky (1905–1950), the founder of radio astronomy
- Marilyn Levy (1922–2014), photographic chemist and inventor based at Fort Monmouth
- Susan Love (1948–2023), surgeon, advocate of preventive breast cancer research and author
- Robert Lewis Morgan (born 1952), served in the New Jersey General Assembly for one term, from 2004 to 2006, where he represented the 12th Legislative District
- Russell Ohl (1898–1987), engineer who is generally recognized for patenting the modern solar cell
- Daniel J. O'Hern (1930–2009), former Associate Justice of the New Jersey Supreme Court
- Declan O'Scanlon (born 1963), politician who represents the 13th Legislative District in the New Jersey General Assembly and served on the Little Silver Borough Council from 1994 to 2007
- Theodore D. Parsons (1894–1978), New Jersey Attorney General from 1949 to 1954
- Mike Rice Jr. (born 1969), former Rutgers Scarlet Knights men's basketball coach
- Meghan Tierney (born 1997), snowboarder who competed in snowboardcross for the United States at the 2018 Winter Olympics in Pyeongchang and in the 2022 Winter Olympics in Beijing, China
- Greg Trooper (1956–2017), folk singer/songwriter
- Casey Webb, television host and professional eater, best known as the host of the television series Man v. Food

== Sources ==
- Schnitzspahn, Karen L. Images of America: Little Silver, p. 106.
