= Parker Homestead =

Historic house in New Jersey, United States

- U.S. National Register of Historic Places
- New Jersey Register of Historic Places
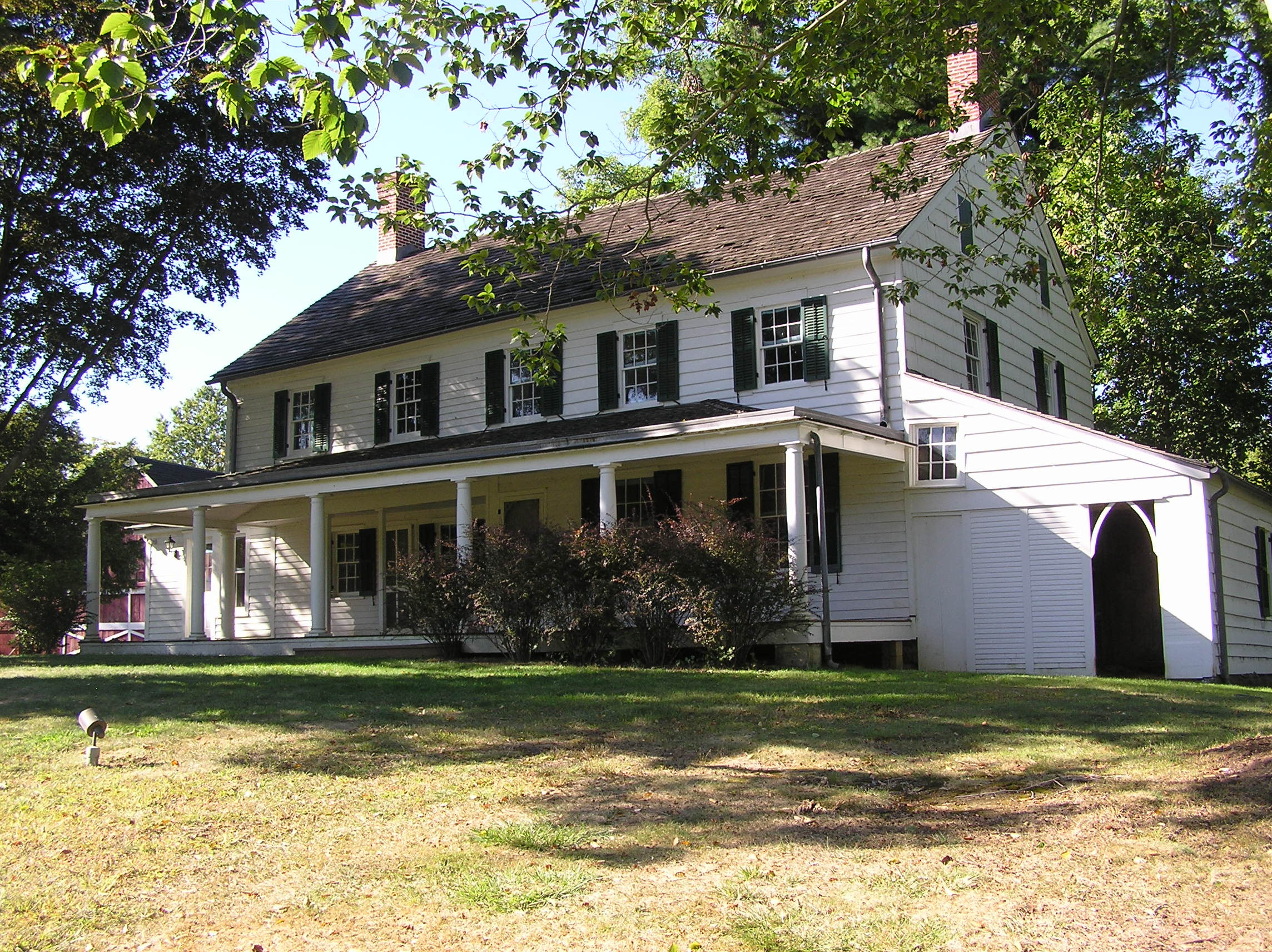

- Location within Monmouth County, New Jersey Location within New Jersey Location within the United States
- Location: 235 Rumson Road, Little Silver, NJ 07739
- Coordinates: 40°20′36″N 74°3′26″W
- Area: 11 acres (4.5 ha)
- Built: 1720
- Architectural style: Vernacular
- NRHP reference No.: 11000966
- NJRHP No.: 2000
- Designated NJRHP: October 16, 2011

The Parker Homestead is a historic home and grounds in Little Silver, New Jersey, United States, located at 235 Rumson Road near Sickles Park. The main house was originally built circa 1720, and includes materials from an earlier structure (c. 1667) the early and late 19th century, and the 1910s and 1920s. It is one of the oldest extant buildings in the state. The farmstead which also includes three outlying barns were listed on the New Jersey Register of Historic Places and the National Register of Historic Places. in 2011.

== Original settlers ==
Little Silver was settled by two of the original patentees of Shrewsbury Township, one of the earliest English-speaking settlements in New Jersey Brothers Joseph and Peter Parker settled in the area in 1667 and owned land bounded by Parker's Creek on the south and Little Silver Creek on the north, named their holdings "Little Silver" after their father's (George Parker) estate in Portsmouth, Rhode Island. The farm remained in the family until the last descendant of the original settlers, Julia Parker, died in 1995.

== Acquisition and preservation ==
After Julia Parker died the homestead was acquired by the borough, through her bequest, with the condition that it be preserved. Studies are being conducted as to how to proceed with restoration of the property. The Garden State Historic Preservation Trust Fund awarded a $44,625 grant for the site and local authorities used that money for preliminary preparations and consultant fees to outline a plan for future work and use of the historic property. The condition of the buildings are considered precarious and immediate stabilization is considered a priority.

In the summer of 2013, an Eagle Scout project was conducted to clear invasive and obtrusive plants from the area surrounding the pond next to the house.

== See also ==
- List of the oldest buildings in New Jersey
- Monmouth County Historical Association
