= Matawan (disambiguation) =

Matawan is a borough in Monmouth County, New Jersey.

Matawan or Mattawan may also refer to:

- Matawan Regional High School, in Aberdeen Township, New Jersey
- Matawan Creek, a stream in northeastern New Jersey
- Matawan, Minnesota, an unincorporated community in Waseca County
- Mattawan, Michigan, United States
  - Mattawan High School, in Mattawan, Michigan
- Mattawan, Ontario, Canada
- Matawan (or Matavan) Township, a former name of Aberdeen Township, New Jersey, in Monmouth County

== See also ==
- Matewan, West Virginia, a town in Mingo County

- Battle of Matewan or "Matewan massacre"; a 1920 coal mine-workers' strike and attempt to unionize in Matewan, West Virginia
- Matewan (film), a 1987 film based on the Battle of Matewan

- Matteawan, New York, a former village that is one of the constituent communities of the city of Beacon
- Matiwane, a South African king
- Mattawa (disambiguation)
- Matawin (disambiguation)
