= Cliffwood Beach, New Jersey =

Unincorporated community in New Jersey, US

- Census-designated place
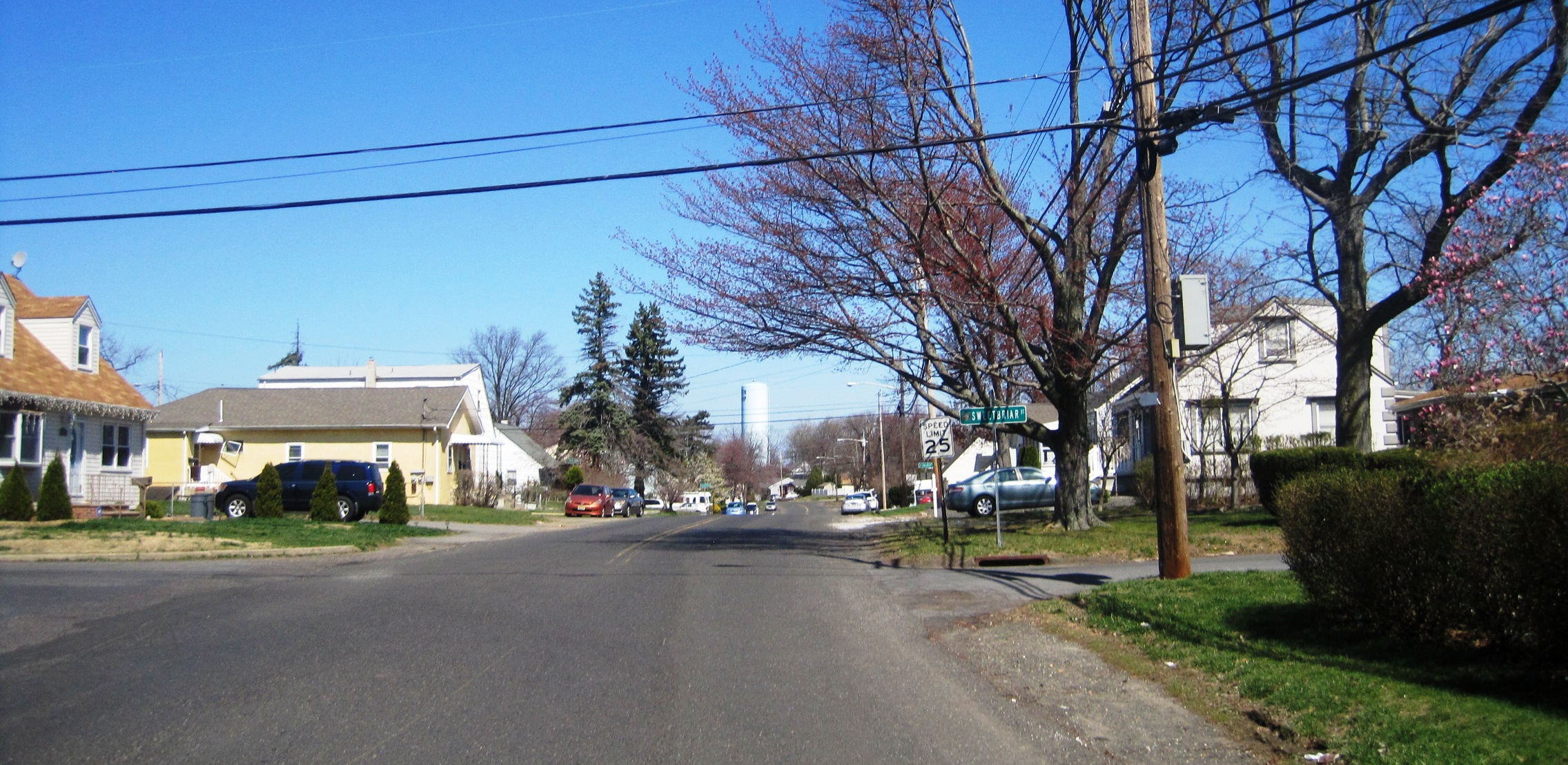
- Intersection of Shore Concourse and Sweetbriar Street in Cliffwood Beach

- Map of Cliffwood Beach in Monmouth County. Inset: Location of Monmouth County in New Jersey.

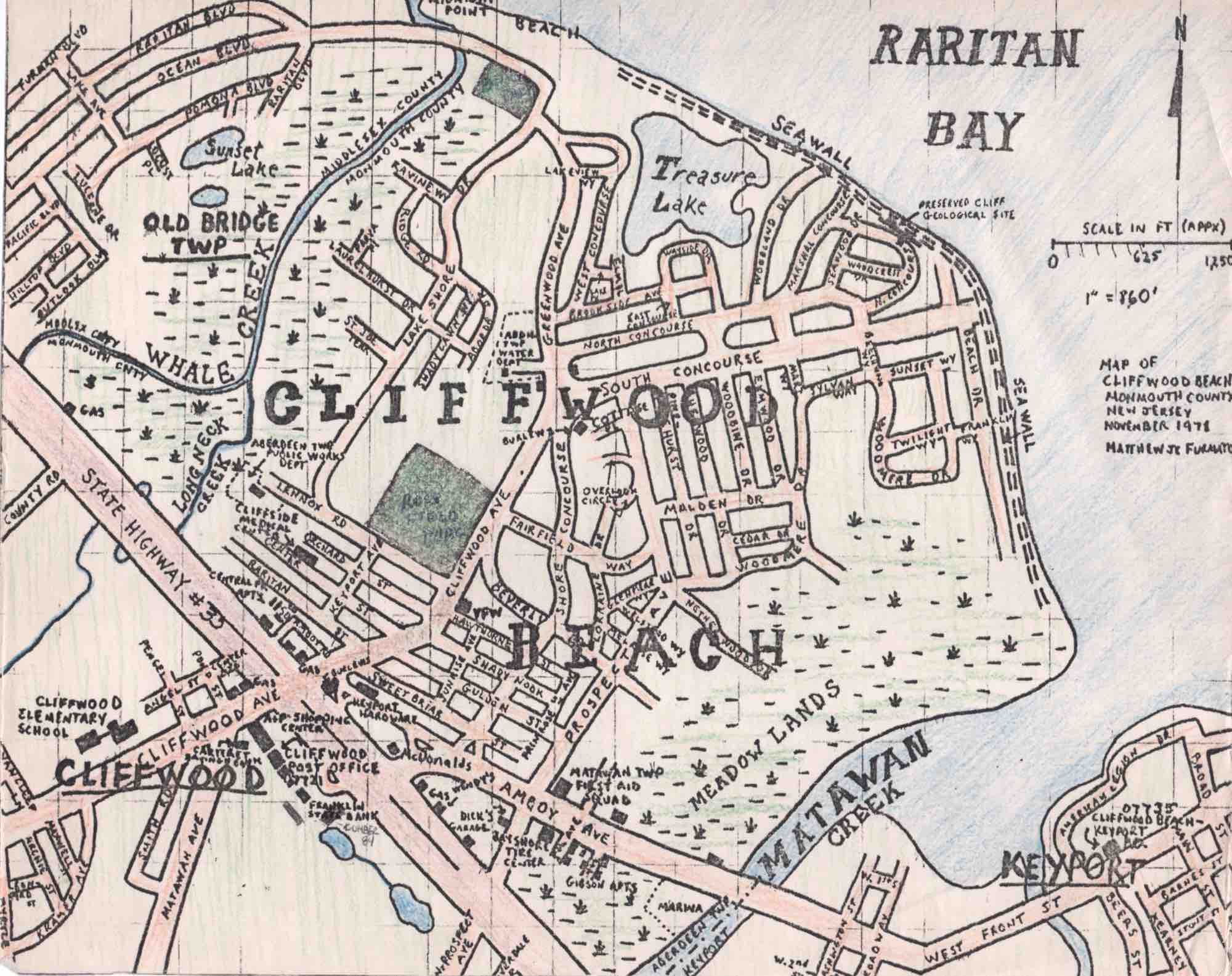
- Hand drawn map of Cliffwood Beach, by Matt Furmato

- Location in Monmouth County Location in New Jersey Location in the United States
- Coordinates: 40.443266°N 74.217960°W
- Country: United States
- State: New Jersey
- County: Monmouth
- Township: Aberdeen

Area
  - Total: 0.96 sq mi (2.49 km^{2})
  - Land: 0.91 sq mi (2.35 km^{2})
  - Water: 0.054 sq mi (0.14 km^{2}) 5.42%
- Elevation: 59 ft (18 m)

Population (2020)
  - Total: 3,036
  - Density: 3,350.8/sq mi (1,293.76/km^{2})
- Time zone: UTC−05:00 (Eastern (EST))
  - Summer (DST): UTC−04:00 (Eastern (EDT))
- ZIP Code: 07735 (Keyport)
- Area codes: 732/848
- FIPS code: 34-13630
- GNIS feature ID: 02389331

Cliffwood Beach is an unincorporated community and census-designated place (CDP) in Aberdeen Township, Monmouth County, New Jersey, United States. As of the 2020 census, the population was 3,036.

== History ==
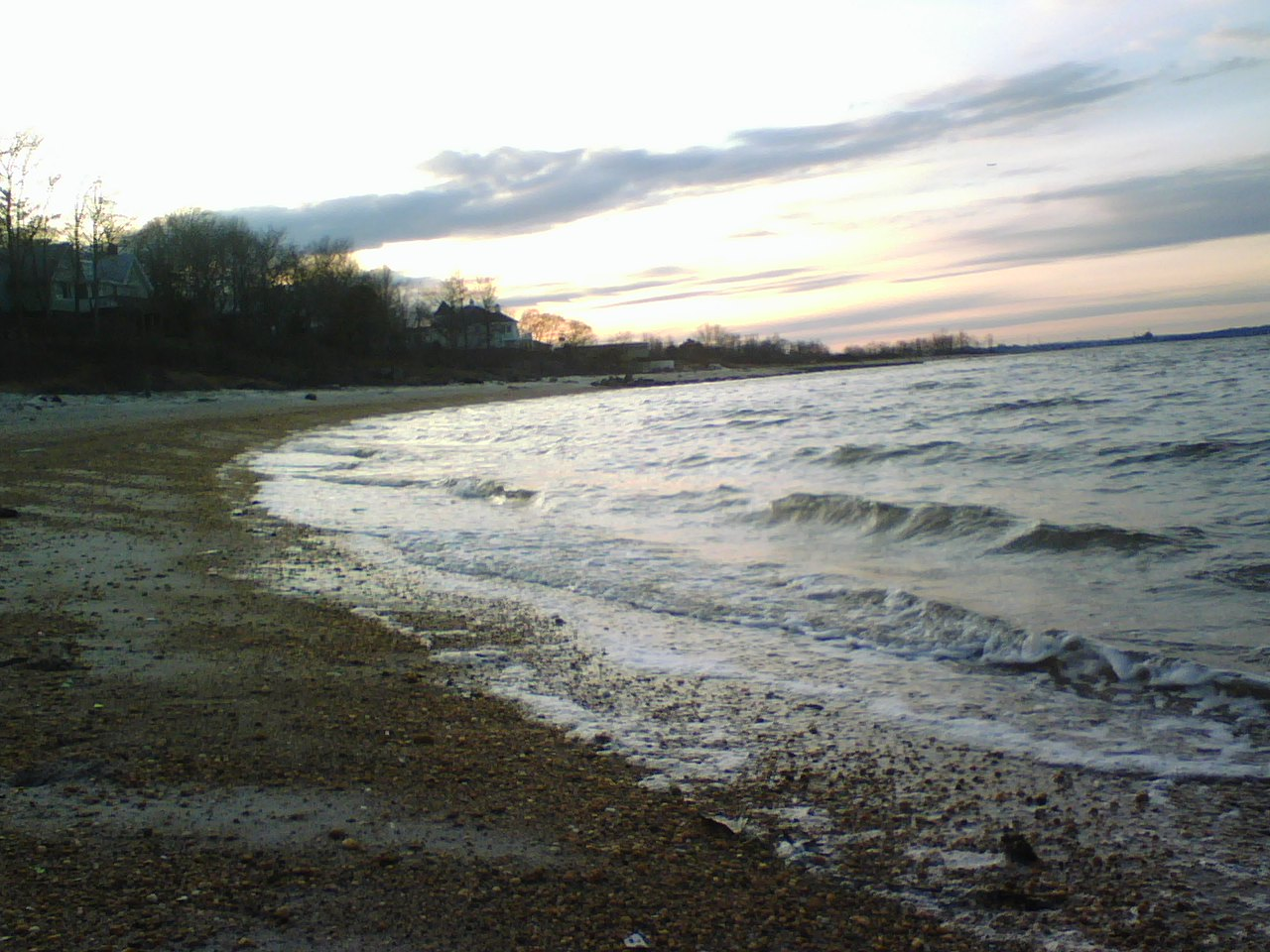
Cliffwood Beach at sunset, looking towards South Amboy

Matawan Township was incorporated on February 23, 1857. This included a portion of Middletown Point (now Matawan Borough), a portion of Mt. Pleasant (renamed Freneau in 1890) and Matawan (or "Matavan" or Matawan Point) beach. The beach area of Matawan Township would later be renamed Cliffwood Beach.

Cliffwood Beach was purchased in 1860 by Henry Clark, who planned on creating a resort community. Although the concept initially failed, in 1923 the company of Morrisey and Walker created the concept of a resort community in Cliffwood Beach, with summer bungalows complementing the emerging resorts of the Jersey shoreline of the 1920s. The real estate sales offices of Morrisey and Walker was a local attraction in itself, being contracted in the appearance of a pirate ship, as an homage to the lore of Captain Kidd and his treasure and Treasure Lake in Cliffwood Beach.

In 1924, a one-mile boardwalk was constructed along the shoreline of Cliffwood Beach. In 1926 the Country Club Casino was built along the cliff walk, overlooking Treasure Lake. Also in 1926, the Cat 'n Fiddle restaurant opened, along with a merry-go-round and an arcade. In 1928, construction began for a salt water pool adjacent to the boardwalk and Treasure Lake. Completed in 1929, it was a state attraction, frequented by Olympic medalists George Kojak and Johnny Weissmuller. Weissmuller later became famous for his role as "Tarzan".

A Cliffwood Beach directional sign is seen briefly in the 1939 documentary The City (with music by Aaron Copland). An unending traffic jam getting to the beach is used in the film as an endemic problem of unplanned growth.

Cliffwood Beach was a popular resort until the 1950s, with a boardwalk, saltwater swimming pool, dining and dancing at the Cat 'n Fiddle, and other amusements. The beachfront facilities were destroyed by a series of hurricanes in 1954: Carol (August 30), Edna (September 11) and Hazel (October 15). In 1955, Hurricane Diane destroyed all that had remained of Cliffwood Beach's amusements, with the exception of the saltwater pool, which survived the storms but was later filled in.

Cliffwood Beach was an early recipient of aid through the New Jersey Department of Environmental Protection's Green Acres Program, which was established in 1961. The township received funds to build a park near the Cliffwood Beach waterfront. The tennis courts have since been converted to an enclosed in-line skating arena, and the original playground equipment and two basketball courts have been upgraded.

The community was featured in Weird NJ magazine's Issue #28. The article, "Cliffwood Beach: A Forgotten Resort", recounted the abrupt manner in which the town was forgotten.

Nothing remains of any of the boardwalk amusements except for the large swimming pool, which lies abandoned and filled with debris.

On August 8, 2017, the Aberdeen Township opened the beachfront Veterans Park, which includes a pirate-ship themed spray park for all ages; two pirate-themed playgrounds, one for kids ages 2–5 and the other 5–12; a picnic grove with shade, a multi-purpose field for Little League baseball, softball, and soccer; a kayak and small watercraft launch; a gazebo/band shell; a flagpole and war veterans' memorial monument; and a restroom/equipment/storage building.

On July 19, 2018, the township completed and opened the Aberdeen Sea Walk, a half-mile trail that primarily runs along the original damaged seawall. It features nine fishing outcrops, 15 outlooks, several benches, and a gazebo. There are 38 LED pathway lights as well as several security cameras to prevent vandalism. A five-foot teak boardwalk outlet path was added by the gazebo to the beach. The project fully connected Beach Drive and Lakeshore Drive, creating the first fully connected recreational infrastructure for the first time in decades.

== Geography ==
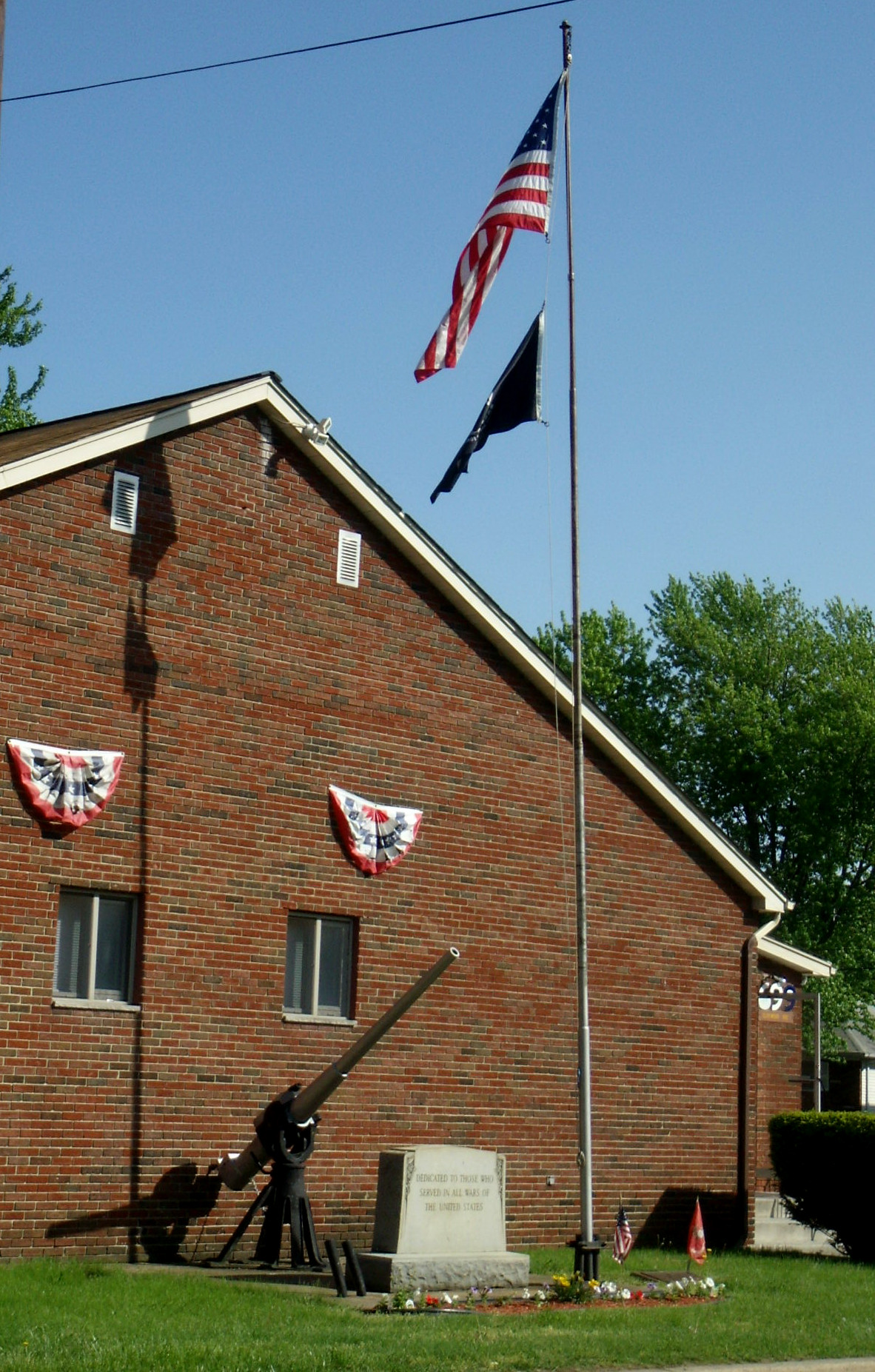
VFW post in Cliffwood Beach

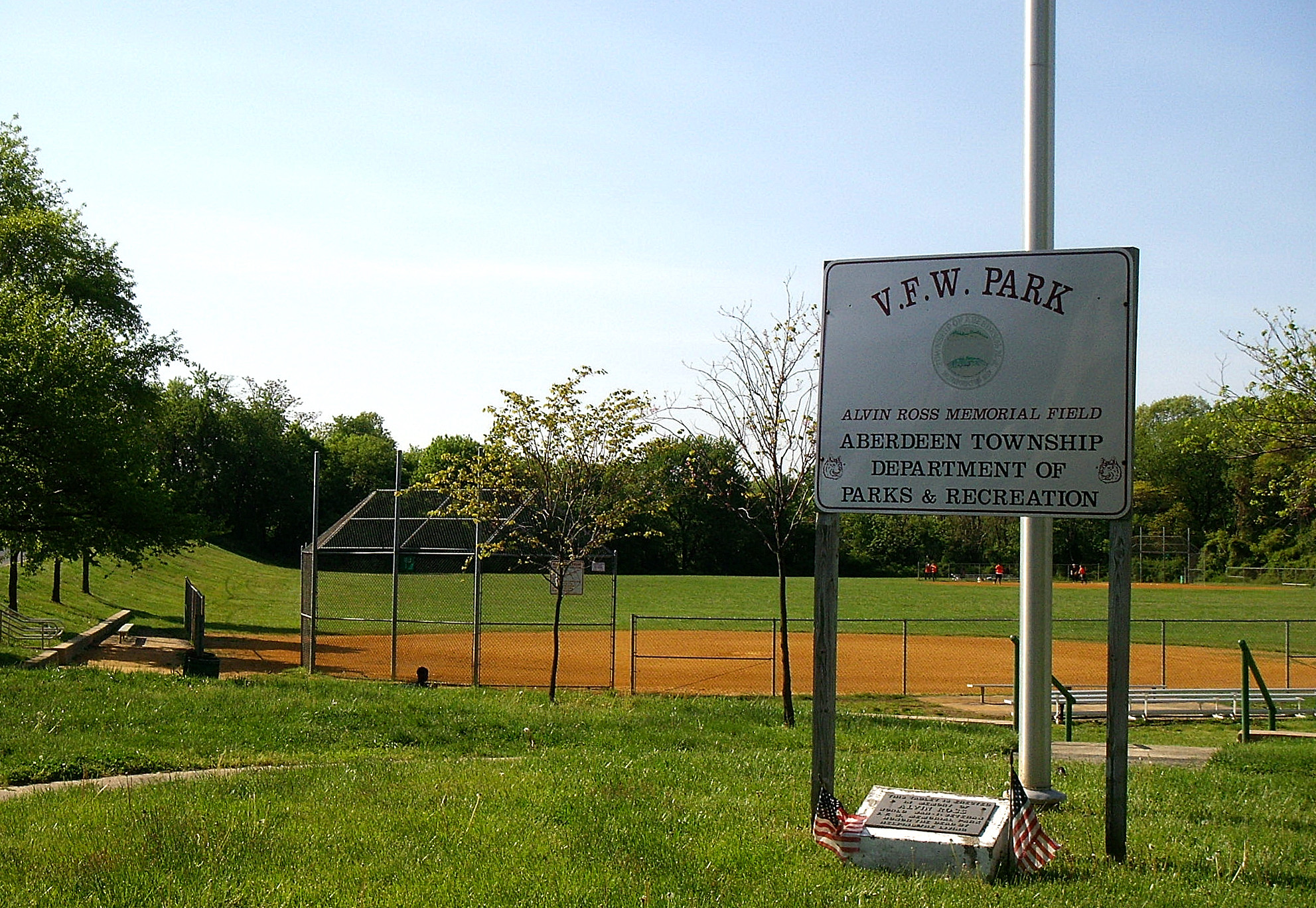
Ross Field

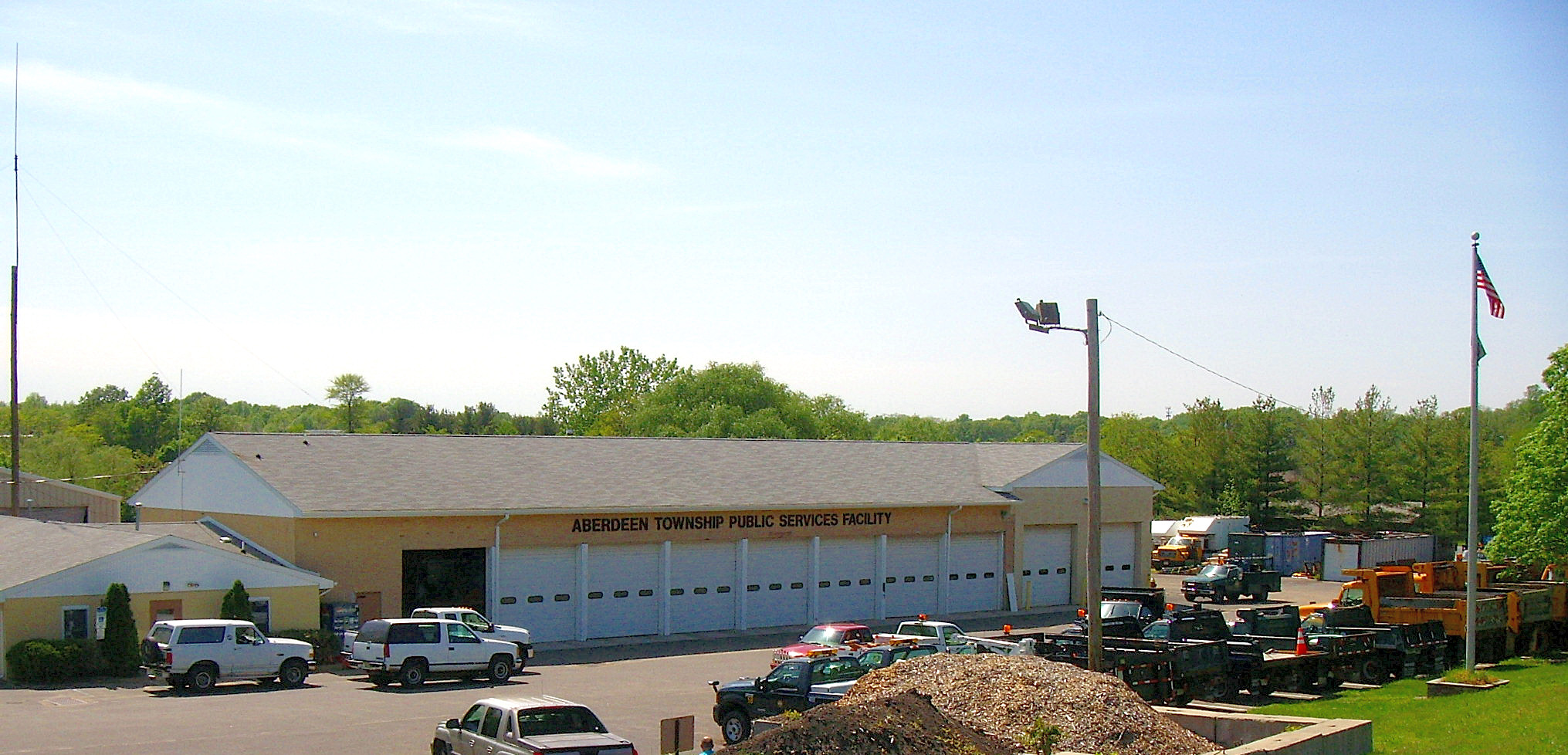
Public Service facility

Cliffwood Beach is in northern Monmouth County, in the northernmost part of Aberdeen Township. It lies north of Route 35 and is bounded by Keyport on the east and Laurence Harbor in Middlesex County on the west. The community faces Raritan Bay, including a portion of Keyport Harbor, and Matawan Creek separates Cliffwood Beach from Keyport. To the west, the beach continues as Raritan Bay Beach and Seidler Beach into Old Bridge Township in Middlesex County. The counties are separated by Whale Creek, which is spanned near the bayfront by a concrete bridge.

According to the U.S. Census Bureau, the Cliffwood Beach CDP has a total area of 0.96 square miles (2.49 km^{2}), including 0.91 square miles (2.36 km^{2}) of land and 0.05 square miles (0.13 km^{2}) of water (5.72%).

Cliffwood Beach is the home of Gaudalcanal Veterans of Foreign Wars (VFW) Post Number 4745, which is used as a community hall, rental facility, and polling place for elections. Adjacent to the VFW post is Veterans of Foreign Wars Park (VFW Park), which contains Alvin Ross Memorial Field. The field, which has two softball diamonds, backstops, team benches and bleachers, is used for local children's and adults' softball and soccer leagues scheduled by the Aberdeen Township Department of Parks and Recreation. The Aberdeen Township Public Service Facility on Lenox Road is the maintenance and recycling facility for the township.

== Education ==
Cliffwood Beach, as a part of Aberdeen Township, is served by the Matawan-Aberdeen Regional School District.

Cliffwood Beach is also home of the Yeshiva Gedolah of Cliffwood, an institution for advanced Talmudic studies.

== Demographics ==
Historical population
Census	Pop.	Note	%±
1950	1,448		—
1970	7,056		—
1990	3,543		—
2000	3,538		−0.1%
2010	3,194		−9.7%
2020	3,036		−4.9%
Population sources: 1950 1960 1970; 1980 1990 2000; 2010 2020

Cliffwood Beach was listed as an unincorporated community in the 1950 U.S. census. It did not appear in the 1960 U.S. census. It was listed as an unincorporated community under the name Cliffwood-Cliffwood Beach in the 1970 U.S. census It did not appear in the 1980 U.S. census. The community was listed as a census designated place in the 1990 U.S. census.

=== Racial and ethnic composition ===
Cliffwood Beach CDP, New Jersey – Racial and ethnic composition Note: the US Census treats Hispanic/Latino as an ethnic category. This table excludes Latinos from the racial categories and assigns them to a separate category. Hispanics/Latinos may be of any race.
Race / Ethnicity (NH = Non-Hispanic)	Pop 2000	Pop 2010	Pop 2020	% 2000	% 2010	% 2020
White alone (NH)	2,559	2,144	1,892	72.33%	67.13%	62.32%
Black or African American alone (NH)	526	407	332	14.87%	12.74%	10.94%
Native American or Alaska Native alone (NH)	11	2	5	0.31%	0.06%	0.16%
Asian alone (NH)	48	101	119	1.36%	3.16%	3.92%
Native Hawaiian or Pacific Islander alone (NH)	0	1	1	0.00%	0.03%	0.03%
Other race alone (NH)	2	16	12	0.06%	0.50%	0.40%
Mixed race or Multiracial (NH)	46	62	139	1.30%	1.94%	4.58%
Hispanic or Latino (any race)	346	461	536	9.78%	14.43%	17.65%
Total	3,538	3,194	3,036	100.00%	100.00%	100.00%

=== 2020 census ===
As of the 2020 census, Cliffwood Beach had a population of 3,036. The median age was 41.3 years. 18.5% of residents were under the age of 18 and 15.2% were 65 years of age or older. For every 100 females there were 96.5 males, and for every 100 females age 18 and over there were 94.5 males.

100.0% of residents lived in urban areas, while 0.0% lived in rural areas.

There were 1,127 households, of which 26.8% had children under the age of 18 living in them. Of all households, 52.2% were married-couple households, 15.6% were households with a male householder and no spouse or partner present, and 23.2% were households with a female householder and no spouse or partner present. About 21.8% of all households were made up of individuals and 7.9% had someone living alone who was 65 years of age or older.

There were 1,184 housing units, of which 4.8% were vacant. The homeowner vacancy rate was 1.1% and the rental vacancy rate was 5.0%.

=== 2010 census ===
The 2010 United States census counted 3,194 people, 1,127 households, and 854 families in the CDP. The population density was 3,516.4 people per square mile (1,357.7 people/km^{2}). There were 1,165 housing units at an average density of 1,282.6 units per square mile (495.2 units/km^{2}). The racial makeup was 75.77% (2,420) White, 13.68% (437) Black or African American, 0.22% (7) Native American, 3.16% (101) Asian, 0.03% (1) Pacific Islander, 4.29% (137) from other races, and 2.85% (91) from two or more races. Hispanic or Latino of any race were 14.43% (461) of the population.

Of the 1,127 households, 31.8% had children under the age of 18; 55.9% were married couples living together; 15.4% had a female householder with no husband present and 24.2% were non-families. Of all households, 18.4% were made up of individuals and 5.1% had someone living alone who was 65 years of age or older. The average household size was 2.82 and the average family size was 3.21.

23.2% of the population were under the age of 18, 8.7% from 18 to 24, 27.6% from 25 to 44, 31.4% from 45 to 64, and 9.1% who were 65 years of age or older. The median age was 38.4 years. For every 100 females, the population had 96.8 males. For every 100 females ages 18 and older there were 94.3 males.

=== 2000 census ===
As of the 2000 U.S. census, there were 3,538 people, 1,149 households, and 881 families residing in the CDP. The population density was 1,468.8 people/km^{2} (3,804 people/mi^{2}). There were 1,178 housing units at an average density of 489.1 units/km^{2} (1,267 units/mi^{2}). The racial makeup of the CDP was 78.60% White, 15.04% African American, 0.31% Native American, 1.36% Asian, 2.88% from other races, and 1.81% from two or more races. Hispanic or Latino of any race were 9.78% of the population.

There were 1,149 households, out of which 38.1% had children under the age of 18 living with them, 57.2% were married couples living together, 14.1% had a female householder with no husband present, and 23.3% were non-families. 16.4% of all households were made up of individuals, and 4.9% had someone living alone who was 65 years of age or older. The average household size was 2.99 and the average family size was 3.37.

In the CDP, the population was spread out, with 26.5% under the age of 18, 7.5% from 18 to 24, 33.7% from 25 to 44, 22.5% from 45 to 64, and 9.8% who were 65 years of age or older. The median age was 36 years. For every 100 females, there were 98.3 males. For every 100 females age 18 and over, there were 94.2 males.

The median income for a household in the CDP was $57,098, and the median income for a family was $61,875. Males had a median income of $44,856 versus $32,714 for females. The per capita income for the CDP was $22,874. About 5.0% of families and 5.5% of the population were below the poverty line, including 7.2% of those under age 18 and 6.5% of those age 65 or over.

== Transportation ==
New Jersey Transit provides local bus service on the 817 route.

New Jersey Route 35 runs along the southwest edge of the CDP, dividing Cliffwood Beach from Cliffwood.

Preceded by Laurence Harbor	Beaches of New Jersey	Succeeded by Union Beach
