= Southern accent =

A Southern accent term usually refers to either:

- Southern accent (United States), the sound system of Southern American English
- English in Southern England
- Southern Accent (newspaper), the weekly student-run newspaper at Southern Adventist University
