= Jim Jeffcoat =

American football player and coach (born 1961)

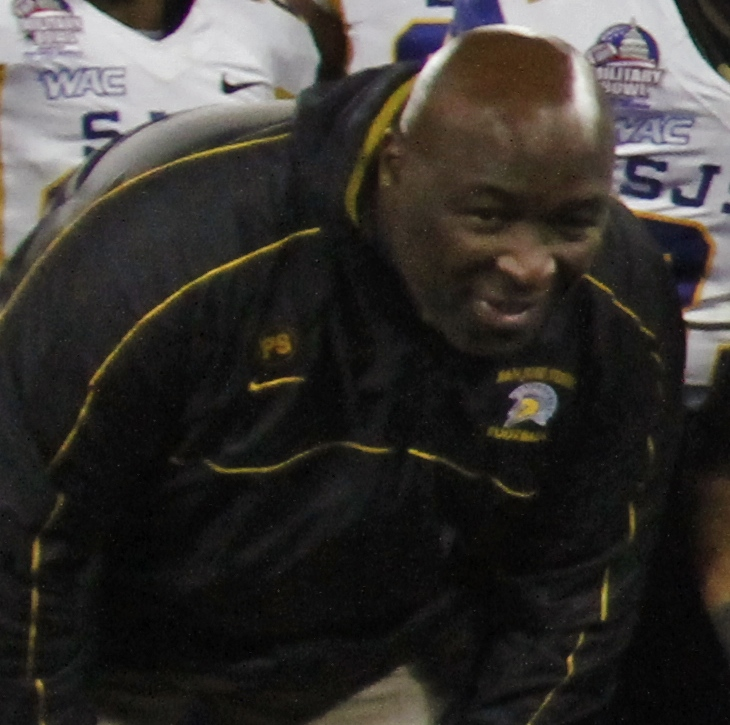
- Jeffcoat after the 2012 Military Bowl

No. 77
- Position: Defensive end

Personal information
- Born: April 1, 1961 (age 65); Long Branch, New Jersey, U.S.
- Listed height: 6 ft 5 in (1.96 m)
- Listed weight: 274 lb (124 kg)

Career information
- High school: Matawan Regional (Aberdeen Township, New Jersey)
- College: Arizona State
- NFL draft: 1983: 1st round, 23rd overall pick

Career history

Playing
- Dallas Cowboys (1983–1994); Buffalo Bills (1995–1997)

Coaching
- Dallas Cowboys (DL) (1998–2004); Houston (DL, 2008–2010); San Jose State (DL, 2011–2012); Colorado (DL, 2013–2017); Orlando Apollos (DL, 2019); Dallas Renegades (DL, 2020)

Awards and highlights
- 2× Super Bowl champion (XXVII, XXVIII); First-team All-Pac-10 (1982)

Career NFL statistics
- Games played: 227
- Sacks: 102.5
- Interceptions: 2
- Touchdowns: 2
- Stats at Pro Football Reference

James Wilson Jeffcoat Jr. (born April 1, 1961) is an American former professional football player who was a defensive end in the National Football League (NFL) for the Dallas Cowboys and Buffalo Bills. He played college football for the Arizona State Sun Devils. He won two Super Bowls with the Cowboys. After his playing career, he became a coach. He is the father of former NFL player and 2013 Big 12 Defensive Player of the Year, Jackson Jeffcoat.

== Early life ==
Jeffcoat grew up in Matawan, New Jersey, and attended Matawan Regional High School. As a senior defensive tackle, he earned high school football All-American honors. He also lettered in wrestling.

The school retired his jersey (#79).

== College career ==
Jeffcoat accepted a football scholarship from Arizona State University. As a sophomore in 1980, he earned the starter job at nose guard.

As a junior in 1981, he was named the starter at left defensive end, leading the team with 10 sacks and contributing to the defense leading the Pac-10 in rushing defense (121.1 yards per game). He received honorable-mention All-Pac-10 honors.

As a senior in 1982, he became the catalyst of the Sun Devils' No. 1 ranked defense (228.9 yards per game). He collected 95 tackles, four sacks, four pass deflections, and forced two fumbles during his senior season, where he earned All-Pac-10, honorable-mention to the All-American Associated Press, United Press International and Sporting News teams. He had 13 tackles, one sack and 2 pass deflections against the University of Houston. He made 12 tackles against USC and Oregon State University. He had a dominating performance in the 1983 Fiesta Bowl, posting 16 tackles, one safety and one forced fumble, while earning outstanding defensive player honors in a 32–21 win over the University of Oklahoma. He finished his college career with 20 sacks. He also played in the East–West Shrine Game and in the Senior Bowl.

On October 22, 1994, he was inducted into the Arizona State Hall of Fame, as arguably one of the greatest defensive linemen to wear a Sun Devil uniform. In 2012, he was inducted into the Arizona State Football Ring of Honor. In 1991, he was inducted into the Fiesta Bowl Hall of Fame. In 2015, he was named to the Pac-12 Conference's All-Century team as one of the five defensive ends.

== Professional career ==
=== Dallas Cowboys ===
Jeffcoat was selected in the first round (23rd overall) of the 1983 NFL draft by the Dallas Cowboys. He was also selected by the Arizona Wranglers in the 1983 USFL territorial draft. He was a backup defensive end as a rookie.

In 1984, he replaced Harvey Martin at the right defensive end position, registering 82 tackles to go along with 11.5 sacks, ranking second on the team and in the top 15 among sack league leaders.

In 1985, he was second on the team with 12 sacks and in the top ten among league leaders. His most memorable game was against the Washington Redskins on November 10, 1985, when he tallied 11 tackles and sacked quarterback Joe Theismann a franchise record 5 times, tying Bob Lilly’s 19-year-old mark. Against the New York Giants, he intercepted a Phil Simms pass that was batted down by Ed "Too Tall" Jones and returned it 65 yards for a touchdown, making a critical play in a win that helped clinch the NFC East title. In 1986, he led the team with a career-high 14 sacks (seventh among league leaders).

Jeffcoat maintained a high level of play through the Cowboys' difficult years of the late '80s. His best season came in 1989, when he finished with a career-high 100 tackles, a career-high 42 quarterback pressures, 11.5 sacks (led team and top 12 among league leaders) and a career-high three fumble recoveries.

During the 1992 season his role was reduced to a situational pass-rusher, after Tony Tolbert took over the left defensive end position and the team traded for Charles Haley to make him the right defensive end. Even with fewer opportunities, he managed to lead the team with 10.5 sacks (top 15 among league leaders) and six tackles for loss, during the team's drive towards winning Super Bowl XXVII. His repertoire of pass rushing moves and effort, allowed him to remain an effective player through the 1994 season, while playing mostly on passing situations.

Jeffcoat left via free agency in 1995, after playing 12 seasons and never missing a game with the Cowboys. He finished with 698 tackles, 94.5 sacks and 149 quarterback pressures. He also accomplished five seasons with 70 or more tackles and five seasons with 10 or more sacks, leaving as the franchise official career sack leader (the NFL didn't start recognizing quarterback sacks as a stat until 1982).

=== Buffalo Bills ===
On February 22, 1995, he was signed as a free agent by the Buffalo Bills. He had a streak of 224 consecutive games played, before being sidelined on September 21 and eventually being placed on the injured reserve list on December 12, 1997.

Jeffcoat retired after playing 15 seasons, with 102.5 sacks, 745 tackles, 194 quarterback pressures, 2 interceptions, 11 fumble recoveries and 2 touchdowns. At the time he ranked among the NFL's top-15 career leaders in sacks and his 227 games, placed him among the top 30 players in NFL history in games played. He was nominated for the Pro Football Hall of Fame Class of 2008 although he was never selected to a Pro Bowl.

== Coaching career ==
After his retirement in 1997, he spent seven seasons (1998–2005) as the Cowboys' defensive ends assistant coach. Jeffcoat spent his last five seasons in the organization as the defensive ends coach after two years as the club's assistant defensive line coach. He was let go on January 28, 2005.

On January 28, 2008, Jeffcoat was hired to join Kevin Sumlin's staff at the University of Houston as the defensive line assistant coach. Prior to arriving in Houston, Jeffcoat was in private business in the Dallas area for two years.

From 2011 to 2012, Jeffcoat coached the San Jose State defensive line under head coach Mike MacIntyre, where he coached Western Athletic Conference player of the year Travis Johnson.

In January 2013, he joined the University of Colorado Buffaloes as the defensive line coach, following the recently hired MacIntyre. He was let go after the 2017 season.

In November 2018, Jeffcoat was hired by Steve Spurrier as defensive line coach for the Orlando Apollos of the Alliance of American Football. He coached with the team in 7 games, until the league ceased operations in April 2019.

In June 2019, Jeffcoat was hired by Bob Stoops as defensive line coach for the Dallas Renegades of the new XFL. In March, amid the COVID-19 pandemic, the league announced that it would be cancelling the rest of the season. On April 10, he had his contract terminated when the league suspended operations.
