= Clapboard (disambiguation) =

Clapboard may refer to:

- Clapboard (architecture), a building material
- Clapperboard, a film production tool
- Clapboard Creek, a stream in New Jersey in the United States
