= Nancy Woodhull =

American journalist (1945-1997)

- Born: March 1, 1945; Perth Amboy, New Jersey, U.S.
- Died: April 1, 1997 (aged 52); Pittsford, New York, U.S.
- Occupation: Journalist
- Employer(s): USA Today; Gannett; Freedom Forum

Nancy Woodhull (March 1, 1945 – April 1, 1997) was an American journalist, best known as a founding editor of USA Today.

== Early life and education ==
Nancy Woodhull was born on March 1, 1945 in Perth Amboy, New Jersey to Harold Cromwell, a factory inspector, and May Cromwell, a hospital administrator. She graduated from Matawan Regional High School, where she was a cheerleader, then attended Trenton State College (since renamed as The College of New Jersey )for one year before dropping out, and at 19, began working as a proofreader at The News Tribune in Woodbridge Township, New Jersey.

== Career ==
At 19, Woodhull dropped out of college to pursue a career in journalism, joining The News Tribune in Woodbridge, New Jersey as a proofreader. She was quickly offered a higher position publishing a weekly education feature. In 1973, she joined the Detroit Free Press as its first female sports reporter. In 1975, she began working for Gannett as the managing editor of its Rochester-based papers, the Times-Union Democrat and Chronicle. She was mentored by Robert Giles while working for Gannett in Rochester.

When Gannett began publishing USA Today in 1982, Woodhull was selected as the paper's managing editor, and went on to become the senior editor. She took a brief leave of absence from the position after a cancer diagnosis, but returned in 1983, when she was named as the president of Gannett News Service, the company's wire service for 83 newspapers. She also served as the president of Gannett New Media, the research and development arm of the corporation. Under Woodhull's leadership, USA Today had the highest percentage of female bylines, according to a 1989 study by a Women, Men, and Media group.

In 1990, Woodhull left Gannett and USA Today to begin working as the vice president and editor-in-chief of Southern Progress Corporation, a division of Time Warner, where she oversaw a book division and the editorial content of magazines such as Southern Living, Progressive Farmer, Southern Accents, Travel South, and Cooking Light.

After feeling unchallenged by her work at Southern Progress, Woodhull returned to Rochester began her own consulting company, Nancy Woodhull & Associates Incorporated, in 1992. She worked alongside her husband, William Watson, and advised companies on consumer and media trends, especially related to women.

From 1990 to 1996, she was a trustee of the Freedom Forum, a nonprofit started by Gannett focused on First Amendment issues. From 1996 until the time of her death, she was the senior vice president for communications at the Freedom Forum as well as the executive director of its Media Studies Center in New York City.

Woodhull served as the president of the National Women's Hall of Fame in Seneca Falls, New York, and alongside Betty Friedan, founded Women, Men and Media to conduct research on women's representation in media. She was also the vice chairwoman of the International Women's Media Foundation and a chairwoman of the Peabody Awards.

== Awards and honors ==
In 1997, Woodhull was posthumously awarded the Lifetime Achievement Award from the International Women's Media Foundation. In 1998, an annual forum on diversity in media was created in Woodhull's honor by the Freedom Forum.

== Personal life and death ==
While working as a sports reporter in Detroit, Woodhull met William Watson at a boating race, and they were married in 1986. Their daughter, Tennessee Jane Watson, was born in 1981 and was named after the sister of Victoria Woodhull, also a women's rights advocate; while Woodhull worked, Watson was a stay-at-home parent. Her daughter is also a journalist and has received a Nieman Fellowship, an Edward R. Murrow Award, and a Peabody Award nomination.

Woodhull died of lung cancer on April 1, 1997 in Pittsford, New York.
