= Lita (restaurant) =

Restaurant in Aberdeen Township, New Jersey, U.S.

- Interactive map of Lita

Restaurant information
- Location: 1055 NJ-34, Aberdeen Township, New Jersey, 07747, United States
- Coordinates: 40°24′06″N 74°13′43″W
- Website: www.thelovelylita.com

Lita is a restaurant in Aberdeen Township, New Jersey. It was a semifinalist in the Best New Restaurant category of the James Beard Foundation Awards in 2024.
