= Charlie Rogers (American football) =

American football player (born 1976)

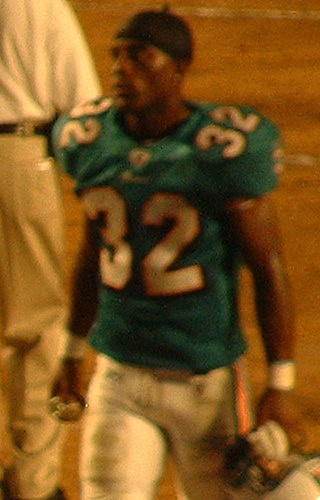
- Rogers with the Dolphins in 2003

No. 20, 31, 32
- Positions: Running back, wide receiver, return specialist

Personal information
- Born: June 19, 1976 (age 50); Cliffwood, New Jersey, U.S.
- Listed height: 5 ft 9 in (1.75 m)
- Listed weight: 180 lb (82 kg)

Career information
- High school: Matawan (NJ)
- College: Georgia Tech
- NFL draft: 1999: 5th round, 152nd overall pick
- Expansion draft: 2002: 1st round, 13th overall pick

Career history
- Seattle Seahawks (1999–2001); Houston Texans (2002)*; Buffalo Bills (2002); Miami Dolphins (2003)
- * Offseason or practice squad member only

Awards and highlights
- First-team All-Pro (1999); NFL All-Rookie Team (1999); Second-team All-ACC (1998)

Career NFL statistics
- Kick return yards: 4,877
- Punt return yards: 1,248
- Touchdowns: 3
- Stats at Pro Football Reference

John Edward "Charlie" Rogers (born June 19, 1976) is an American former professional football player who was a running back and wide receiver in the National Football League (NFL) for the Seattle Seahawks (1999–2001), the Houston Texans (2002), the Buffalo Bills (2002) and the Miami Dolphins (2003). He was selected in the fifth round of the 1999 NFL draft with the 152nd overall pick.

Rogers led the NFL in average punt return yardage in his rookie season, 1999. He also returned a kickoff 85 yards for a touchdown in the Seattle Seahawks playoff loss to the Miami Dolphins (the last points scored by a Seahawk in Kingdome history).

Rogers was in the 2002 NFL expansion draft. He was drafted by the Houston Texans, 13th overall.

Rogers played college football with the Georgia Tech Yellow Jackets and attended high school at Matawan Regional High School and is currently the head football coach for the Matawan Midgets.
