= Chingarora Creek =

Tributary of Keyport Harbor in New Jersey

Coordinates: 40°26′49″N 74°11′09″W

Chingarora Creek is a tributary of Keyport Harbor in Monmouth County, New Jersey in the United States. Chingarora Creek's source is in Hazlet Township, flowing north into Keyport Harbor, an arm of Raritan Bay.

== See also ==
- List of rivers of New Jersey
