= Mattawa =

Mattawa may refer to:

- Mattawa, Ontario, Canada
- Mattawa River, Ontario, Canada
- Mattawa Bay, on the Gouin Reservoir, in Quebec, Canada
- Mattawa, Washington, U.S.

== See also ==
- Mattawan (disambiguation)
