= Jay Bellamy =

American football player (born 1972)

No. 20
- Position: Safety

Personal information
- Born: July 8, 1972 (age 54); Perth Amboy, New Jersey, U.S.
- Listed height: 5 ft 11 in (1.80 m)
- Listed weight: 200 lb (91 kg)

Career information
- High school: Matawan Regional (NJ)
- College: Rutgers
- NFL draft: 1994: undrafted

Career history
- Seattle Seahawks (1994–2000); New Orleans Saints (2001–2007)

Awards and highlights
- Second-team All-East (1991)

Career NFL statistics
- Total tackles: 759
- Sacks: 9.5
- Forced fumbles: 4
- Passes defended: 21
- Interceptions: 24
- Touchdowns: 1
- Stats at Pro Football Reference

Jay Bellamy (born July 8, 1972) is an American former professional football player who was a safety for the Seattle Seahawks and the New Orleans Saints of the National Football League (NFL). After playing college football for the Rutgers Scarlet Knights, he went undrafted in the 1994 NFL draft. He was then signed as an undrafted free agent by the Seattle Seahawks.

== Early life ==
Bellamy was raised in the Cliffwood section of Aberdeen Township, New Jersey, and attended Matawan Regional High School, where he was a letterman in football and track. In football, he was a two-way starter as a quarterback and as a free safety.

== College career ==
Bellamy attended Rutgers University, and played for the Rutgers Scarlet Knights football team. In his first season, he appeared in 6 games and had 2 interceptions and returned them both for a total of 48 yards and one for a touchdown. In his second season, he appeared in 11 games and had 2 interceptions and returned them both for a total of 25 yards. In his third season he appeared in 10 games and had 4 interceptions and returned them for a total of 9 yards. In his last season he appeared in 9 games and returned 5 punts for a total of 60 yards.

== NFL career statistics ==
Legend
**Bold**	Career high

=== Regular season ===
Year	Team	Games		Tackles				Interceptions				Fumbles			
Year	Team	GP	GS	Comb	Solo	Ast	Sck	Int	Yds	TD	Lng	FF	FR	Yds	TD
1994	SEA	3	0	0	0	0	0.0	0	0	0	0	0	0	0	0
1995	SEA	15	0	3	2	1	0.0	0	0	0	0	1	0	0	0
1996	SEA	16	0	18	16	2	0.0	3	18	0	16	0	0	0	0
1997	SEA	16	7	52	42	10	**2.0**	1	13	0	13	0	0	0	0
1998	SEA	16	16	98	80	18	1.0	3	40	0	24	**2**	2	0	0
1999	SEA	16	16	**104**	**91**	13	0.0	**4**	4	0	7	0	1	0	0
2000	SEA	16	16	88	70	18	**2.0**	**4**	**132**	**1**	**84**	**2**	0	0	0
2001	NOR	16	16	93	71	**22**	**2.0**	3	21	0	21	0	0	0	0
2002	NOR	16	16	89	69	20	1.5	3	39	0	16	0	2	0	0
2003	NOR	16	16	95	78	17	1.0	3	19	0	10	1	0	0	0
2004	NOR	16	16	92	74	18	0.0	0	0	0	0	**2**	**3**	**12**	0
2005	NOR	3	3	10	8	2	0.0	0	0	0	0	0	0	0	0
2006	NOR	11	3	16	12	4	0.0	0	0	0	0	0	0	0	0
2007	NOR	3	0	1	1	0	0.0	0	0	0	0	0	0	0	0
		179	125	759	614	145	9.5	24	286	1	84	8	8	12	0

=== Playoffs ===
Year	Team	Games		Tackles				Interceptions				Fumbles			
Year	Team	GP	GS	Comb	Solo	Ast	Sck	Int	Yds	TD	Lng	FF	FR	Yds	TD
1999	SEA	1	1	6	5	1	0.0	0	0	0	0	0	0	0	0
2006	NOR	2	2	**15**	**11**	**4**	0.0	0	0	0	0	0	0	0	0
		3	3	21	16	5	0.0	0	0	0	0	0	0	0	0

== Personal life ==
His son, Jayden, attended Bergen Catholic High School in Oradell, New Jersey, and committed to Notre Dame as part of the 2022 recruiting class.
