= Strathmore, New Jersey =

Populated place in Monmouth County, New Jersey, US

- Census-designated place
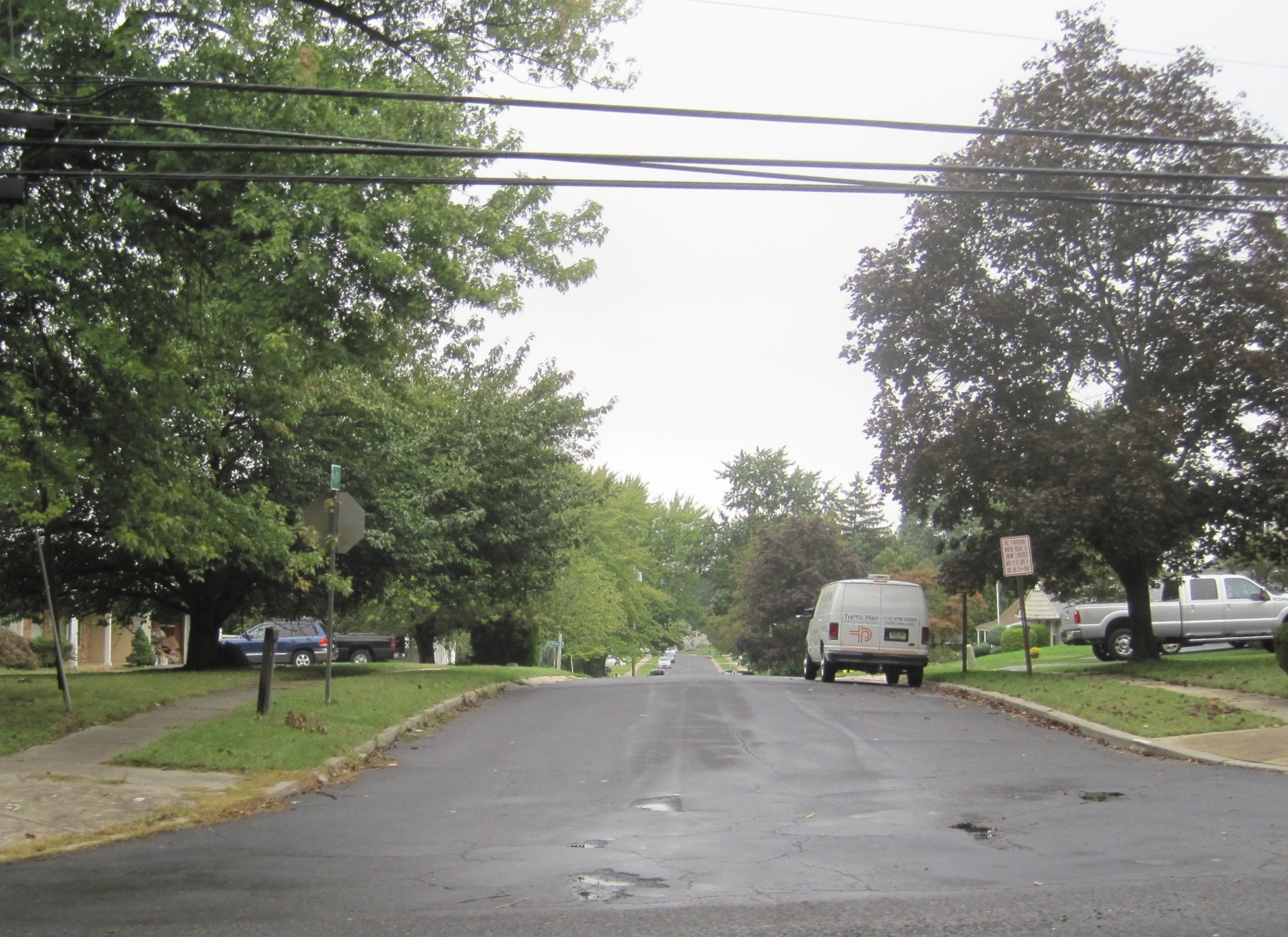
- Looking along Ivy Way in Strathmore

- Map of Strathmore highlighted within Monmouth County. Right: Location of Monmouth County in New Jersey.

- Location in Monmouth County Location in New Jersey Location in the United States
- Coordinates: 40.401587°N 74.219349°W
- Country: United States
- State: New Jersey
- County: Monmouth
- Township: Aberdeen

Area
  - Total: 2.02 sq mi (5.23 km^{2})
  - Land: 1.97 sq mi (5.10 km^{2})
  - Water: 0.050 sq mi (0.13 km^{2}) 2.47%
- Elevation: 49 ft (15 m)

Population (2020)
  - Total: 7,225
  - Density: 3,670.3/sq mi (1,417.11/km^{2})
- Time zone: UTC−05:00 (Eastern (EST))
  - Summer (DST): UTC−04:00 (Eastern (EDT))
- ZIP Code: 07747 (Matawan)
- Area codes: 732/848
- FIPS code: 34-71280
- GNIS feature ID: 02390366

Strathmore is an unincorporated community and census-designated place (CDP) within Aberdeen Township, in Monmouth County, New Jersey, United States. At the 2020 census, the CDP's population was 7,225.

Strathmore was built starting in the early 1960s by Levitt & Sons, marketed as a higher-end version of the Levittown communities that the firm was known for. The 2,000 new homes in the development led to a jump in the township's population of 10,000 over the decade, a jump of more than 140%.

== Geography ==
Strathmore is in northern Monmouth County and occupies most of the southeastern part of the township. It is bordered to the west by the borough of Matawan, to the east by Hazlet Township and Holmdel Township, and to the south by Marlboro Township. New Jersey Route 34 runs through the southwest side of the community, leading northwest into Matawan and south-southeast 3 miles (5 km) to Holmdel.

According to the United States Census Bureau, the Strathmore CDP has a total area of 2.019 square miles (5.23 km^{2}), including 1.969 square miles (5.10 km^{2}) of land and 0.050 square miles (0.13 km^{2}) of water (2.48%).

== Demographics ==
Historical population
Census	Pop.	Note	%±
1970	7,674		—
1990	7,060		—
2000	6,740		−4.5%
2010	7,258		7.7%
2020	7,225		−0.5%
Population sources: 1950 1960 1970; 1980 1990 2000; 2010 2020

Strathmore first appeared as an unincorporated community in the 1970 U.S. census. The community did not appear in the 1980 U.S. census and then was listed as a census designated place in the 1990 U.S. census.

=== 2020 census ===
As of the 2020 census, Strathmore had a population of 7,225. The median age was 43.8 years. 21.2% of residents were under the age of 18 and 17.6% of residents were 65 years of age or older. For every 100 females there were 94.7 males, and for every 100 females age 18 and over there were 92.6 males age 18 and over.

100.0% of residents lived in urban areas, while 0.0% lived in rural areas.

There were 2,619 households in Strathmore, of which 33.7% had children under the age of 18 living in them. Of all households, 66.0% were married-couple households, 10.8% were households with a male householder and no spouse or partner present, and 19.1% were households with a female householder and no spouse or partner present. About 17.8% of all households were made up of individuals and 8.5% had someone living alone who was 65 years of age or older.

There were 2,698 housing units, of which 2.9% were vacant. The homeowner vacancy rate was 1.2% and the rental vacancy rate was 6.7%.

Racial composition as of the 2020 census
Race	Number	Percent
White	5,824	80.6%
Black or African American	270	3.7%
American Indian and Alaska Native	11	0.2%
Asian	392	5.4%
Native Hawaiian and Other Pacific Islander	1	0.0%
Some other race	149	2.1%
Two or more races	578	8.0%
Hispanic or Latino (of any race)	726	10.0%

=== 2010 census ===
The 2010 United States census counted 7,258 people, 2,557 households, and 2,089 families in the CDP. The population density was 3,682.0 people per square mile (1,421.6 people/km^{2}). There were 2,607 housing units at an average density of 1,322.6 units per square mile (510.7 units/km^{2}). The racial makeup was 86.68% (6,291) White, 3.94% (286) Black or African American, 0.10% (7) Native American, 6.63% (481) Asian, 0.03% (2) Pacific Islander, 1.25% (91) from other races, and 1.38% (100) from two or more races. Hispanic or Latino of any race were 6.85% (497) of the population.

Of the 2,557 households, 38.1% had children under the age of 18; 71.4% were married couples living together; 7.5% had a female householder with no husband present and 18.3% were non-families. Of all households, 15.0% were made up of individuals and 6.6% had someone living alone who was 65 years of age or older. The average household size was 2.83 and the average family size was 3.16.

25.0% of the population were under the age of 18, 5.7% from 18 to 24, 24.8% from 25 to 44, 31.4% from 45 to 64, and 13.0% who were 65 years of age or older. The median age was 41.7 years. For every 100 females, the population had 95.1 males. For every 100 females ages 18 and older there were 93.1 males.

=== 2000 census ===
At the 2000 census there were 6,740 people, 2,348 households, and 2,031 families living in the CDP. The population density was 1,414.3 people/km^{2} (3,663 people/mi^{2}). There were 2,360 housing units at an average density of 495.2 units/km^{2} (1,283 units/mi^{2}). The racial makeup of the CDP was 87.79% White, 3.29% African American, 0.06% Native American, 6.50% Asian, 0.64% from other races, and 1.72% from two or more races. Hispanic or Latino of any race were 4.67% of the population.

Of the 2,348 households 38.9% had children under the age of 18 living with them, 76.8% were married couples living together, 7.5% had a female householder with no husband present, and 13.5% were non-families. 11.2% of households were one person and 4.5% were one person aged 65 or older. The average household size was 2.87 and the average family size was 3.11.

The age distribution was 25.1% under the age of 18, 5.1% from 18 to 24, 31.0% from 25 to 44, 27.1% from 45 to 64, and 11.6% 65 or older. The median age was 39 years. For every 100 females, there were 94.6 males. For every 100 females age 18 and over, there were 93.4 males.

The median household income was $85,890 and the median family income was $90,655. Males had a median income of $61,971 versus $39,559 for females. The per capita income for the CDP was $32,984. About 2.0% of families and 2.3% of the population were below the poverty line, including 3.8% of those under age 18 and 0.6% of those age 65 or over.

== Transportation ==
New Jersey Transit provides bus transportation to the Port Authority Bus Terminal in Midtown Manhattan on the 133 route.
