= Anthony Brown (quarterback) =

American football player (born 1998)

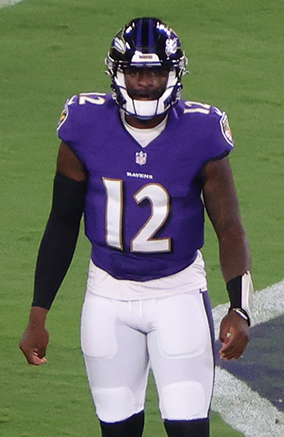
- Brown with the Baltimore Ravens in 2022

Profile
- Position: Quarterback

Personal information
- Born: July 27, 1998 (age 28); Aberdeen Township, New Jersey, U.S.
- Listed height: 6 ft 1 in (1.85 m)
- Listed weight: 217 lb (98 kg)

Career information
- High school: St. John Vianney (Holmdel Township, New Jersey)
- College: Boston College (2016−2019); Oregon (2020−2021)
- NFL draft: 2022: undrafted

Career history
- Baltimore Ravens (2022); Las Vegas Raiders (2024)*; Buffalo Bills (2024)*; Arizona Cardinals (2024)*; Buffalo Bills (2024)*; Houston Roughnecks (2025); Montreal Alouettes (2026)
- * Offseason or practice squad member only

Career NFL statistics
- Passing attempts: 49
- Passing completions: 22
- Completion percentage: 44.9%
- TD–INT: 0–2
- Passing yards: 302
- Passer rating: 48.2
- Stats at Pro Football Reference

Anthony Almein Brown Jr. (born July 27, 1998) is an American professional football quarterback. He played college football for the Boston College Eagles and Oregon Ducks. He has played professionally in the National Football League (NFL) for the Baltimore Ravens, in the United Football League (UFL) for the Houston Roughnecks, and in the Canadian Football League (CFL) for the Montreal Alouettes.

== Early life ==
Brown grew up in the Cliffwood section of Aberdeen Township, New Jersey, and attended St. John Vianney High School in Holmdel Township, New Jersey. He became the team's starting quarterback going into his junior year and passed for 2,198 yards and 25 touchdowns while rushing for 839 yards and eight touchdowns. As a senior, he passed for 2,298 yards and 33 touchdowns while rushing for 604 yards and nine touchdowns and was named first-team All-State and the Shore Conference Football Player of the Year.

== College career ==
=== Boston College ===
Brown redshirted his true freshman season at Boston College. The next year, Brown became the second freshman in school history to start a season opener and completed 134 of 258 passes for 1,367 yards and 11 touchdowns with nine interceptions before he suffered a season-ending knee injury. He started all 12 of the Eagles' games and completed 158 of 285 pass attempt for 2,121 yards with 20 touchdowns and nine interceptions in his redshirt sophomore season. As a redshirt junior, Brown completed 81-of-137 passes for 1,250 yards with nine touchdowns and two interceptions before suffering a season-ending knee injury six games into the season. After the firing of head coach Steve Addazio at the end of the season, Brown announced that he would be leaving Boston College with the intention of playing elsewhere as a graduate transfer. He committed to transfer to Oregon over Georgia, Mississippi State, Colorado, Michigan State, Vanderbilt, South Florida, and Northern Illinois.

=== Oregon ===
Brown began his first season at Oregon as the backup to starter Tyler Shough. He made his first appearance for the Ducks in the 2020 Pac-12 Football Championship Game, where he played mostly in goal line situations and completed three of four pass attempts for 17 yards and two touchdowns as Oregon won 31–24 over the USC Trojans. Brown replaced Shough in the second quarter of the 2021 Fiesta Bowl against the Iowa State Cyclones and finished the game with 12-for-19 for 147 yards and two rushing touchdowns in a 34–17 loss. After the season, Brown opted to utilize the extra year of eligibility granted to college athletes who played in the 2020 season due to the coronavirus pandemic.

Brown was named the Ducks' starting quarterback going into the 2021 season after Shough had transferred to Texas Tech following the 2020 season. He started all 14 of Oregon's games and completed 64.1% of his passes for a Pac-12 Conference-leading 2,989 yards with 18 touchdown passes and seven interceptions and also rushed 151 times for 658 yards and nine touchdowns.

== Professional career ==
Pre-draft measurables
Height	Weight	Arm length	Hand span	Wingspan	40-yard dash	10-yard split	20-yard split	20-yard shuttle	Vertical jump	Broad jump
6 ft 1 3/8 in (1.86 m)	217 lb (98 kg)	32 1/2 in (0.83 m)	9 7/8 in (0.25 m)	6 ft 4 7/8 in (1.95 m)	4.70 s	1.69 s	2.71 s	4.28 s	34.0 in (0.86 m)	9 ft 11 in (3.02 m)
All values from Pro Day

=== Baltimore Ravens ===
Brown signed with the Baltimore Ravens as an undrafted free agent on May 6, 2022. He was waived on August 30, and signed to the practice squad the next day. He was elevated from the practice squad on December 11 to backup Tyler Huntley due to an injury to Lamar Jackson. On the same day, he made his first career appearance in Week 14 against the Pittsburgh Steelers after Huntley was knocked out of the game with a concussion. Brown completed 3 of 5 passes for 16 yards and helped the Ravens win 16–14. He was signed to the active roster on December 31. Brown would start in the Ravens Week 18 game against the Cincinnati Bengals due to Jackson and Huntley being injured. He threw for 286 yards, but also committed three turnovers as the Ravens lost 16–27.

On August 29, 2023, Brown was waived by the Ravens and re-signed to the practice squad. He was released on September 4.

=== Las Vegas Raiders ===
On January 8, 2024, Brown signed a reserve/future contract with the Las Vegas Raiders. He was waived on August 16.

=== Buffalo Bills (first stint) ===
On August 20, 2024, Brown signed with the Buffalo Bills, but was waived five days later.

=== Arizona Cardinals ===
On October 22, 2024, Brown was signed to the Arizona Cardinals' practice squad.

=== Buffalo Bills (second stint) ===
After his practice squad contract with the Cardinals expired, Brown was signed to the Bills' practice squad ahead of their game with the Baltimore Ravens, primarily to serve as the scout team quarterback in practice, as Brown was familiar with Lamar Jackson's style of play. Brown was released following the game (which the Bills won) on January 22, 2025.

=== Houston Roughnecks ===
On February 7, 2025, Brown signed with the Houston Roughnecks of the United Football League (UFL).

=== Montreal Alouettes ===
Brown was signed by the Montreal Alouettes of the Canadian Football League (CFL) on February 9, 2026. He dressed for the first six games of the 2026 season as a backup quarterback but did not attempt any passes. He was subsequently moved to the practice roster and later released on September 15, 2026.

== Career statistics ==
=== NFL ===
Year	Team	Games			Passing								Rushing				Sacks		Fumbles	
Year	Team	GP	GS	Record	Cmp	Att	Pct	Yds	Y/A	TD	Int	Rtg	Att	Yds	Y/A	TD	Sck	Yds	Fum	Lost
2022	BAL	2	1	0−1	22	49	44.9	302	6.2	0	2	48.2	3	–5	–1.7	0	5	14	1	1
Career		2	1	0−1	22	49	44.9	302	6.2	0	2	48.2	3	–5	–1.7	0	5	14	1	1

=== UFL ===
Year	Team	Games			Passing									Rushing				
Year	Team	GP	GS	Record	Cmp	Att	Pct	Yds	Y/A	Lng	TD	Int	Rtg	Att	Yds	Avg	Lng	TD
2025	HOU	3	3	1−2	27	56	48.2	241	4.3	37	1	3	43.8	7	61	9.5	20	0
Career		3	3	1-2	27	56	48.2	241	4.3	37	1	3	43.8	7	61	9.5	20	0

=== College ===
Year	Team	Games			Passing								Rushing			
Year	Team	GP	GS	Record	Comp	Att	Pct	Yards	Avg	TD	Int	Rate	Att	Yards	Avg	TD
2016	Boston College	DNP														
2017	Boston College	10	10	5–5	134	258	51.9	1,367	5.3	11	9	103.5	42	210	5.0	1
2018	Boston College	12	12	7–5	158	285	55.4	2,121	7.4	20	9	134.8	54	85	1.6	1
2019	Boston College	6	6	3–3	81	137	59.1	1,250	9.1	9	2	154.5	33	128	3.9	2
2020	Oregon	2	0	0–0	15	23	65.2	164	7.1	2	0	153.8	7	40	5.7	2
2021	Oregon	14	14	10–4	250	390	64.1	2,989	7.7	19	7	141.0	151	658	4.4	9
Career		44	42	25−17	638	1,093	58.4	7,891	7.2	61	27	132.5	287	1,121	3.9	15
