= Matawan Regional High School =

High school in Monmouth County, New Jersey, US

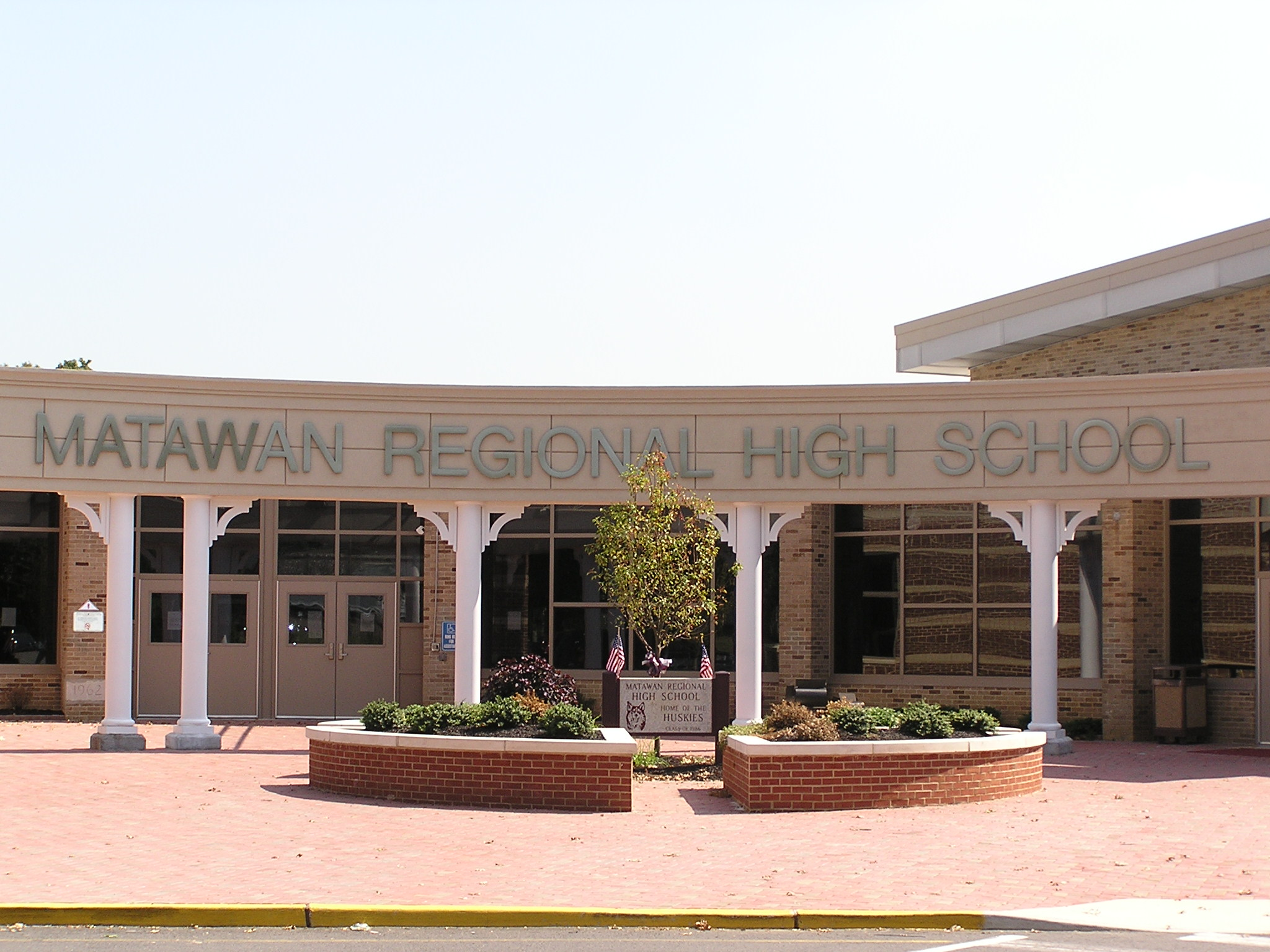

Location
- 450 Atlantic Avenue; Aberdeen Township, Monmouth County, New Jersey 07747; United States; 40.409064°N 74.224036°W

Information
- Type: Regional public high school
- Motto: Excellence in education
- Established: 1924
- School district: Matawan-Aberdeen Regional School District
- Superintendent: Joseph G. Majka
- NCES School ID: 340975003958
- Principal: Mike Wells
- Faculty: 87.1 FTEs
- Grades: 9–12
- Enrollment: 1,038 (as of 2024–25)
- Student to teacher ratio: 11.9:1
- Hours in school day: 6 hours, 44 minutes
- Colors: Maroon and steel gray
- Athletics conference: Shore Conference
- Mascot: Husky
- Team name: Huskies
- Accreditation: Middle States Association of Colleges and Schools
- Newspaper: HuskieView
- Yearbook: The Pillar
- Website: mrhs.marsd.org

Matawan Regional High School is a four-year regional public high school located in Aberdeen Township, United States, serving students in ninth through twelfth grades as the lone secondary school of the Matawan-Aberdeen Regional School District. Serving students from Aberdeen Township and Matawan, it is one of Monmouth County's largest schools. The school has been accredited by the Middle States Association of Colleges and Schools since 1951. The school mascot is a husky.

As of the 2024–25 school year, the school had an enrollment of 1,038 students and 87.1 classroom teachers (on an FTE basis), for a student–teacher ratio of 11.9:1. There were 279 students (26.9% of enrollment) eligible for free lunch and 74 (7.1% of students) eligible for reduced-cost lunch.

== Awards, recognition and rankings ==
The school was the 139th-ranked public high school in New Jersey out of 339 schools statewide in New Jersey Monthly magazine's September 2014 cover story on the state's "Top Public High Schools", using a new ranking methodology. In 2016, the school moved up to 114. The school had been ranked 92nd in the state of 328 schools in 2012, after being ranked 126th in 2010 out of 322 schools listed. The magazine ranked the school 111th in 2008 out of 316 schools. The school was ranked 115th in the magazine's September 2006 issue, which surveyed 316 schools across the state.

Schooldigger.com ranked the school 253rd out of 376 public high schools statewide in its 2010 rankings (a decrease of 38 positions from the 2009 rank) which were based on the combined percentage of students classified as proficient or above proficient on the language arts literacy and mathematics components of the High School Proficiency Assessment (HSPA).

== History ==
When the State of New Jersey mandated graded school systems replace district schools in 1894, Matawan Township and Matawan Borough constructed an eight-room brick school building at the corner of Broad Street and South Street, which was completed and occupied in 1895.

A 1913 graduate described the school as having four rooms on the first floor, and four rooms and a long, wide hall on the second floor. There was no indoor plumbing until a major addition was made to the building about 1910, so outdoor toilets were used for about fifteen years. Sanitary facilities were added in the basement. The Class of 1913 consisted of 34 eighth graders, most of whom were expected to go to work after they finished school.

By 1923, the school was so overcrowded that it was running double sessions to teach its students in 12 rooms, so the township voted to build a new high school next door.

The first Matawan High School was completed and occupied in 1924 on 8 acres (32,000 m^{2}) at the corner of Broad Street and South Street. The 2 1/2-story brick building of Georgian design was constructed at a cost of $175,000 (equivalent to $3.3 million in 2025). It contained 13 classrooms, a study hall, a cafeteria, an auditorium seating 527, and a gymnasium with capacity for 300. The school had 388 students and 14 teachers in 1936; 76 seniors graduated with the Class of 1936. The school had recently taken in students from Laurence Harbor, effectively doubling the graduating class between 1933 and 1936. The school, which included some middle school students in 1957, had 540 high school students and their 28 teachers. After it was replaced in 1962, consideration was given to making the old high school an elementary school but it was eventually demolished.

A hallway at Matawan Regional High School

Matawan Regional High School was built to deal with sharp population growth due to the construction of 2,300 new housing units in the area. Population nearly doubled between the 1960 census figure of 12,456 and the 1965 estimate of 21,177. Constructed at a cost of $2.5 million (the value of $25.5 million in 2025), the school opened in September 1962 with nearly 1,200 students in grades 7–12. The school had 1,780 students and 102 teachers in the 1964/1965 school year. The 62 rooms included 33 classrooms, two gymnasiums, an auditorium, a cafeteria, two music rooms, two industrial arts shops, eight science rooms, and two fine arts rooms.

The school underwent a $13.3 million renovation project completed in September 2004 which included a new facade, new chemistry and oceanography laboratory classrooms, a new art wing, including a kiln, computer labs, as well as a new greenhouse. The sports department received a renovated artificial turf football field and stadium lighting. Streetside saw a new electronic sign.

== Demographics ==
Enrollment Trends by Grade
Grade	2021–22
9	320
10	269
11	244
12	275

Enrollment Trends by Student Group
Student Group	2021–22
Female	49.6%
Male	50.4%
Economically Disadvantaged Students	25%
Students with Disabilities	15.1%
English Learners	1.0%
Homeless Students	X
Students in Foster Care	X
Military-Connected Students	X
Migrant Students	X

Enrollment by Racial and Ethnic Group
Racial and Ethnic Group	2021–22
White	60.8%
Hispanic	17.6%
Black or African American	12.2%
Asian	6.2%
Native Hawaiian or Pacific Islander	0.3%
American Indian or Alaskan Native	0.2%
Two or More Races	2.8%

Enrollment Trends by Full and Shared Time Status
Enrollment Status	2015–16	2016–17	2017–18
Full Time Students	981	983	1,005
Shared Time Students	62	60	64
Full Time Equivalent	1,012	1,013	1,037

Enrollment by Home Language
Home Language	% of Students
English	94.5%
Spanish	2.9%
Other Languages	2.7%

== Sports ==
The Matawan High School Huskies compete in Division B North of the Shore Conference, an athletic conference comprised of public and private high schools in Monmouth and Ocean counties along the Jersey Shore. The league operates under the jurisdiction of the New Jersey State Interscholastic Athletic Association (NJSIAA). With 797 students in grades 10–12, the school was classified by the NJSIAA for the 2019–20 school year as Group III for most athletic competition purposes, which included schools with an enrollment of 761 to 1,058 students in that grade range. The school was classified by the NJSIAA as Group III South for football for 2024–2026, which included schools with 695 to 882 students.

The school participates in a joint ice hockey team with Howell High School as the host school / lead agency. The co-op program operates under agreements scheduled to expire at the end of the 2023–24 school year.

The Matawan High School baseball team (63–2) won the Central Jersey championship three consecutive years from 1922 to 1924 under Coach Benjamin W. Davis. Matawan's African-American pitcher Henry Schanck was edged out by Keyport High School in a 16-inning match in 1924. The Works Progress Administration (WPA) added a sports field at the high school in 1936. The 1959 Huskies baseball team, coached by George Deitz, won the Shore Conference championship and competed in the Group I state championships, losing in the first round. Their star pitcher, Carl Stephens, threw three no-hitters that season and was signed by the Los Angeles Dodgers, playing in their minor league system until an arm injury ended his career. The team won the Central Jersey Group II state sectional championship in 1960.

The Matawan Catfish swim team competed against the Laurence Harbor Eels at nearby Lake Lefferts in spring 1936.

The boys track team won the spring / outdoor track title in Group I in 1955–1958 and won the Group II championship in 2013.

The boys' bowling team won the overall state championship in 1969. The boys' team won their division back-to-back in 2017 (tied with Keansburg as co-champion) and 2018. The 2018 season saw the boys team achieve an undefeated season in divisional matches going 45–0.

In 1958, the Matawan High School Huskies football squad, led by Coach Barry Rizzo, won the Shore Conference Championship, losing only to Neptune High School. They defeated their rivals, the Keyport High School Red Raiders in a hard-fought Thanksgiving Day game, by a score of 6–2. Notable players on that Huskies team were the "Touchdown Twins", David Jones and Purvis Peeler. The 1973 football team finished the season with a record of 7–2 and was awarded the Central Jersey Group III title by the NJSIAA based on strength of schedule, despite Manasquan High School finishing with a 9–0 record. In the playoff era, the football team won the Central Jersey state sectional championships in Group IV in 1975; in Group III in 1988, 1991, 1992 and 2014; and in both 2009 and 2011 in Group II. In 1975 the team won the Central Jersey Group III title with a 7–0 win against previously unbeaten Colonia High School in the championship game to finish the season with a record of 11–0 and extend their winning streak to 19 games. The 1988 team finished the season with an 11–0 record after winning the Central Jersey Group III title with a 14–6 victory against Franklin High School, which had entered the championship game with a 21-game winning streak. The 1991 team won the Central Jersey Group II title with a 28–14 victory against Ocean Township High School to finish the season 9–2. In 1992, the team finished the season 10–1 and won its second Central Jersey Group II sectional title with a 29–28 win against Neptune High School on a Two-point conversion scored in overtime. In 2009, the football team won the Central Jersey Group II sectional title by a score of 28–12 against Manasquan High School in a game played at The College of New Jersey, marking the program's first sectional title in more than 25 years. The team won the program's seventh sectional title in 2014 with a 27–7 win against Carteret High School in the Central Jersey Group III state sectional championship.

The girls' spring track team was the Group IV state champion in 1973 and 1974.

The girls' bowling team was overall state champion in 1974 and won the Group I title in 2018.

In 2005, the softball team won the Central Jersey Group II state sectional championship with a 1–0, 12-inning win in the tournament final against Carteret High School, earning the program's first state championship.

In 2009, the boys' indoor and outdoor track and field teams took the Central Jersey Group II titles, marking the first time since 1996 since the boys team took the outdoor title, and the first time the indoor team had ever taken a state title. The indoor team won a second consecutive title in 2010, defeating second place Summit High School by a score of 56–42 in the finals. In 2011, the outdoor track and field team won its third consecutive Central Jersey, Group II sectional title, edging Long Branch High School 80–77 for the victory.

The boys' track team won the indoor relay state championship in Group II in 2013, 2015 and 2017. The girls team won the Group II title in 2013.

The boys' track team won the indoor track state championship in Group II in 2013. The girls team won the Group II title in 2015.

The boys' basketball team won the 2013–14 Central Jersey Group II state sectional championship with a 67–54 win in the tournament final against Rumson-Fair Haven Regional High School, going 24–5 throughout the season.

In 2014, the boys' track and field team won the B-North division championships and the Central Jersey Group II sectional champs, earning the team's seventh sectional title, having most recently won in 2011.

== Academics ==
PSAT, SAT, & ACT – Participation
Participation Type	School Participation Rate	State Participation Rate
10th and 11th graders taking PSAT 10/NMSQT in 2017–18	95.0%	85.0%
12th graders taking SAT in 2017–18 or prior years	77.7%	72.2%
12th graders taking ACT in 2017–18 or prior years	15.5%	24.6%

PSAT, SAT, & ACT – Performance
Participation Type	School Average Score	State Average Score	College Readiness Benchmarks	School – Students Scores at or above Benchmark	State – Students Scores at or above Benchmark
PSAT 10/NMSQT – Reading and Writing	476	478	Grade 10: 430 Grade 11: 460	62%	62%
PSAT 10/NMSQT – Math	487	478	Grade 10: 480 Grade 11: 510	46%	42%
SAT – Reading and Writing	541	542	480	75%	72%
SAT – Math	566	543	530	66%	54%
ACT – Reading	25	24	22	74%	62%
ACT – English	24	24	18	89%	78%
ACT – Math	24	24	22	76%	62%
ACT – Science	23	23	23	63%	53%

== Music ==
Music has deep roots at Matawan. In 1895, the New York Press ran a statewide competition to determine the most popular new school in the budding New Jersey school system. Matawan returned the most coupons, defeating its nearest competitor by 40,000 votes, thereby winning a Chickering and Sons piano.

== Marching band ==
The Matawan Marching Huskies band won the national championships in Jacksonville, Florida, in 1977. They are led by band director Tyler Smayda.

In the 2011 season, the Marching Huskies finished first in the Tournament of Bands (TOB) Group II Chapter X (Greater NYC Metro) Championships with a score of 93.0. The chapter title was the first for the band since 2006. They ended the season with a 3rd-place finish at the TOB Atlantic Coast Championships in Hershey, Pennsylvania with a score of 95.5, earning the Marching Huskies not only their highest-ever placement at the ACCs, but their highest score in school history.

In the 2024 season, the Marching Huskies finished first in the USBands Group 1A State Championships in South Brunswick, New Jersey with a score of 92.4. The band also achieved best overall effect, music, visual, and colorguard. The band ended the season with a second place finish at the USBands A Class National Championships in Allentown, Pennsylvania with a score of 95.0, also achieving best effect and colorguard.

== Staff ==
The school's principal is Michael C. Wells, who is assisted by two assistant principals.

== Notable alumni ==
- Monica Aksamit (born 1990, class of 2008), saber fencer who won a bronze medal at the 2016 Summer Olympics in the Women's Saber Team event
- Jay Bellamy (born 1972), safety who played in the NFL for the Seattle Seahawks and New Orleans Saints
- Erison Hurtault (born 1984, class of 2003), Olympic sprinter who competed in the 400 metres at the 2012 Summer Olympics representing Dominica
- Eugene Michael Hyman (born 1950, class of 1968), retired judge
- Jim Jeffcoat (born 1961), professional football player for the Dallas Cowboys and the Buffalo Bills from 1983 to 1997
- Bob Milligan (born 1932, class of 1951), retired lieutenant general in the United States Marine Corps who served as Comptroller of Florida from 1994 to 2002
- Retta (born 1970, class of 1988), actress known for her role as Donna Meagle on NBC's Parks and Recreation
- Charlie Rogers (born 1976), former NFL running back, wide receiver and kick returner
- Anthony Sesely (born 1983), professional stock car racing driver who competes in the NASCAR Whelen Modified Tour
- J. Michael Straczynski (born 1954), writer for television, film and comics, attended 1970
- Eileen Tell (born 1966), former professional tennis player
- Nancy Woodhull (1945–1997, class of 1963), co-founding editor of USA Today, president of Gannett, executive vice president and editor in chief of the Southern Progress Corporation
