= Keyport Harbor =

- Brown's Point Cove
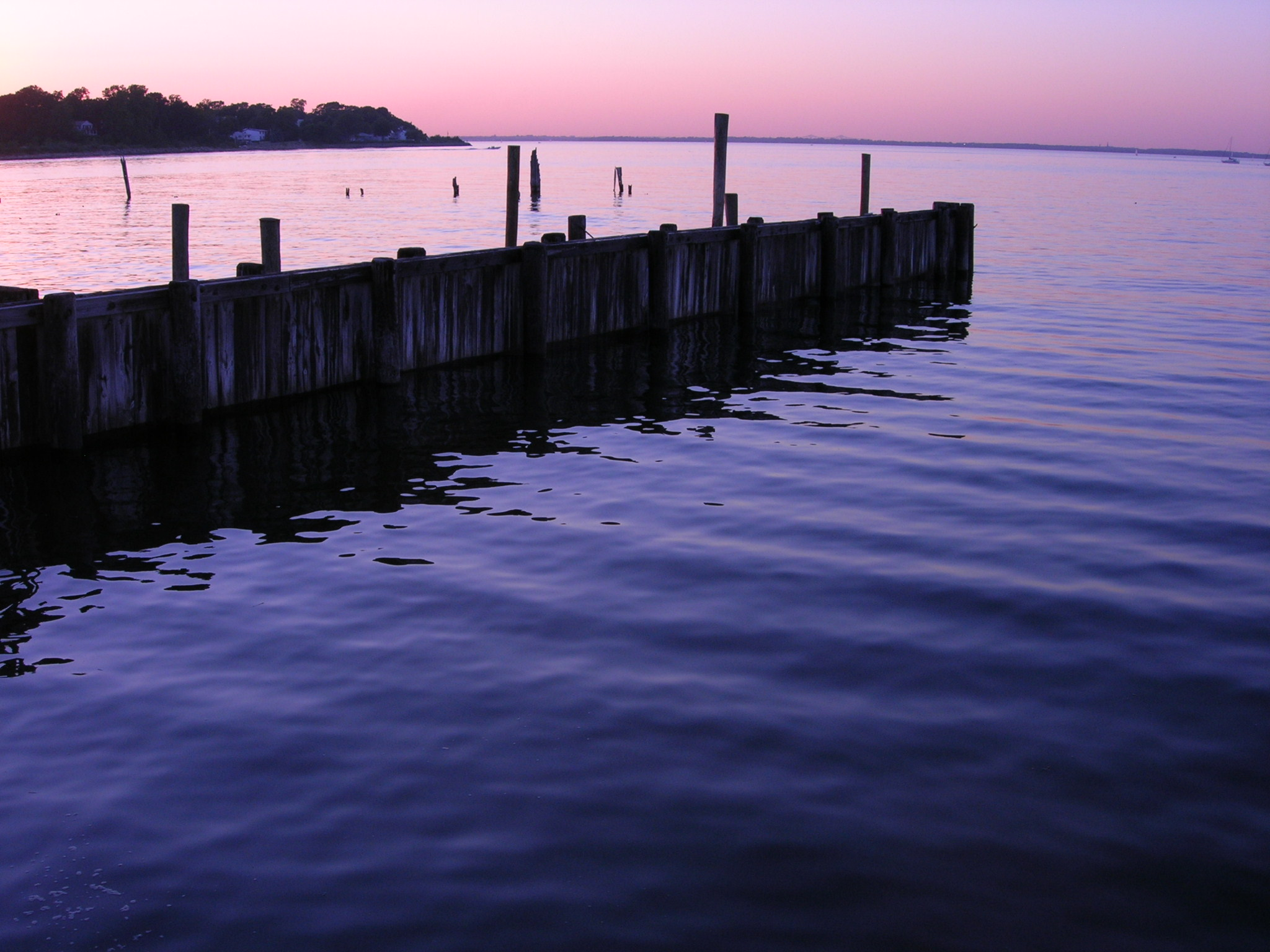
- A portion of the Keyport Waterfront in Monmouth County, New Jersey

- Location of Keyport Harbor, in Northern Monmouth County, New Jersey
- Location: Keyport, New Jersey
- Coordinates: 40°26′40.386″N 74°11′57.518″W
- Type: Harbor
- Part of: Raritan Bay
- Primary inflows: Luppatatong Creek; Matawan Creek; Chingarora Creek
- Ocean/sea sources: Atlantic Ocean
- Basin countries: United States
- Managing agency: NY/NJ Baykeeper
- Max. depth: 8 feet (2.4 m)
- Surface elevation: 0 feet (0 m)

Keyport Harbor is an arm of Raritan Bay, located on the south side of the bay. Streams flowing into Keyport Harbor include Matawan Creek, Luppatatong Creek and Chingarora Creek.

An earlier name for Keyport Harbor is Brown's Point Cove.
