= Yeshiva Gedolah of Cliffwood =

Coordinates: 40.44216°N 74.22399°W

Location
- 200 Center Street; Keyport, New Jersey; 07735

Information
- Established: 2004
- Rosh Yeshiva (dean): Shimon Alster
- Affiliation: Orthodox Judaism
- Bachurim: 80

Yeshiva Gedolah of Cliffwood is an Orthodox Jewish yeshiva in Cliffwood, New Jersey. Founded in 2004, it offers high school, beis medrash, and kollel programs. Located in Cliffwood (part of Aberdeen Township), it has a Keyport mailing address.

== History ==
The yeshiva was founded in 2004 by Shimon Alster, It is listed as a higher education institution by the New Jersey Office of the Secretary of Higher Education.

== Controversy ==
In August 2016 the citizens of Cliffwood Beach voiced their concerns against an expansion of the Yeshiva Gedolah of Cliffwood due to zoning restrictions on the area that is being planned for its construction.
