= Matawan Creek =

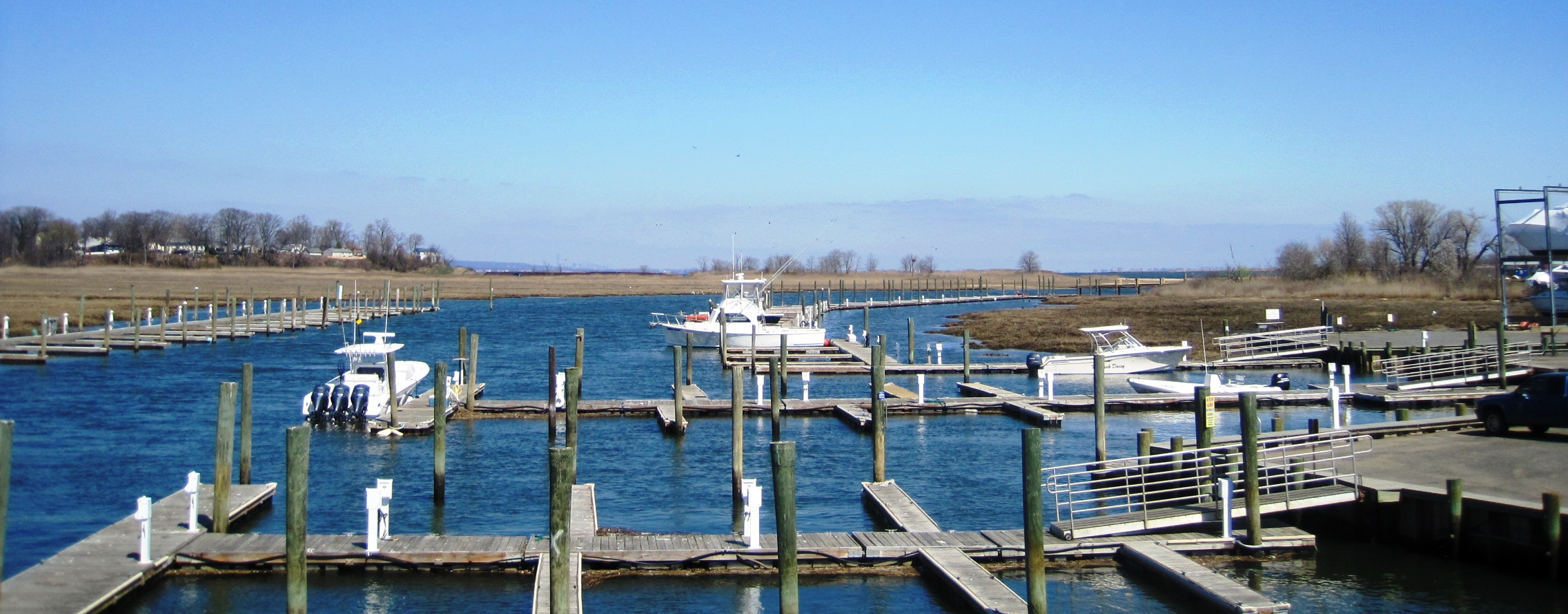
- Looking towards the creek's mouth as seen from Front Street in Keyport at the border with Aberdeen Township

Location
- Country: United States
- State: New Jersey
- Counties: Monmouth

Physical characteristics
- Source
  - location: Bakers Brook; Marlboro Township
  - coordinates: 40°24′57″N 74°13′56″W
- Mouth
  - location: Keyport Harbor; Keyport, New Jersey
  - coordinates: 40°26′20″N 74°12′18″W
  - elevation: 0 feet (0 m)
- Basin size: 1,100 sq mi (2,800 km^{2})

Basin features
- Population: ~1.2 million
- Tributaries
  - left: Clapboard Creek
  - right: Birch Swamp Brook, Gravelly Brook, Mohingson Creek
- Waterbodies: Lake Lefferts

Matawan Creek is a creek and partially a tidal inlet of Raritan Bay. It lies in Monmouth County, New Jersey, United States, across from Staten Island, New York City.

== Course ==
Matawan Creek's main flow begins as Bakers Brook in Marlboro Township, Monmouth County, north of the intersection of Tennent and Woolleytown Roads. From this point it flows northward through Marlboro and Aberdeen Townships to a point near the Middlesex County line, where it turns in a northeasterly direction. Birch Swamp Brook enters from the right; below this confluence is the impoundment, Lake Lefferts. The section of Bakers Brook in Aberdeen Township is also known as Matawan Brook.

Lake Lefferts lies in Aberdeen Township and Matawan Borough and passes under County Route 516 and New Jersey Route 34. Below the dam at Ravine Drive Matawan Creek becomes a tidal estuary, meandering through a salt marsh to its mouth. Here it receives the flow of Gravelly Brook, Clapboard Creek and Mohingson Creek and reenters Aberdeen Township. This section was formerly navigable to commercial shipping.

Between the Garden State Parkway and New Jersey Route 35 the creek becomes navigable for small private craft and some residences fronting upon the creek have private docks. Downstream of Route 35 are several marinas, although since both the bridge at Route 35 and that at County Route 6 have a low clearance, vessels with masts must remain downstream of County Route 6. From Route 35 to the mouth Matawan Creek forms the boundary between Aberdeen Township and Keyport Borough. There are no further bridges downstream of County Route 6 and Matawan Creek empties into Keyport Harbor, an arm of Raritan Bay.

Although not a tributary of Matawan Creek, Luppatatong Creek enters Keyport Harbor very near to the mouth of Matawan Creek.

== Etymology ==
Matawan Creek derives its name from Matawan Neck, situated between Matawan Creek and Whale Creek. During the 17th and 18th centuries this was the plantation of Thomas Rudyard and later Andrew Bowne. This land is now Cliffwood and Cliffwood Beach in Aberdeen Township. It may originate from the Southern Unami Matawonge, "bad riverbank" or "bad hill", a possible reference to bluffs along Raritan Bay which were subject to erosion and collapse prior to the construction of a seawall in the 1970s. Another possible source is Matawan, Northern Unami for "bad fog", which may have referred to fog generated on Raritan Bay.

== Geology ==
William Bullock Clark named the Matawan Formation after exposures on the creek and nearby.

== History ==
During the Jersey Shore shark attacks of 1916, the creek was made infamous due to the shark attacks on July 12, 1916, occurring 1.5 miles (2.5 km) from the ocean. A shark killed 11-year-old Lester Stillwell and his 24-year-old would-be rescuer Stanley Fisher and severely injured 14-year-old Joseph Dunn later that same day.

== Tributaries ==
- Bakers Brook
- Birch Swamp Brook
- Clapboard Creek: located entirely within Aberdeen Township, flowing east into Matawan Creek
- Gravelly Brook: source is in the Mount Pleasant Hills, flowing north into Matawan Creek
- Watson's Brook
- Mohingson Creek: originates in the Mount Pleasant Hills, and flows north through Holmdel and Aberdeen Townships into Matawan Creek. The name is sometimes shortened to Whingson or Winkson.

== See also ==
- List of New Jersey rivers
