= Lake Lefferts =

- Location in New Jersey
- Location: Matawan, New Jersey
- Coordinates: 40°24′52″N 74°14′05″W
- Type: Reservoir
- Surface elevation: 13 feet (4.0 m)

Lake Lefferts (Latitude: 40.414552, Longitude: -74.234589) is a man-made lake in Matawan, New Jersey. The lake is the result of the construction in 1928 of Lake Lefferts Dam, which captured and stored the flow of Matawan Creek.

The lake is home to sunnies(sunfish), bluegill, crappie, bass, catfish, and pickerel. Near Ravine Drive is a recreational outdoor area, which includes a public fishing dock, boat launch, and canoe rental.
