= Luppatatong Creek =

Stream in New Jersey

Coordinates: 40.435809°N 74.207368°W

Luppatatong Creek is a tributary of Keyport Harbor in Monmouth County, New Jersey in the United States.

Luppatatong Creek's source is in the Mount Pleasant Hills, flowing north into Keyport Harbor, an arm of Raritan Bay.

== See also ==
- List of rivers of New Jersey
