= Aberdeen Township, New Jersey =

Township in Monmouth County, New Jersey, US

- Township
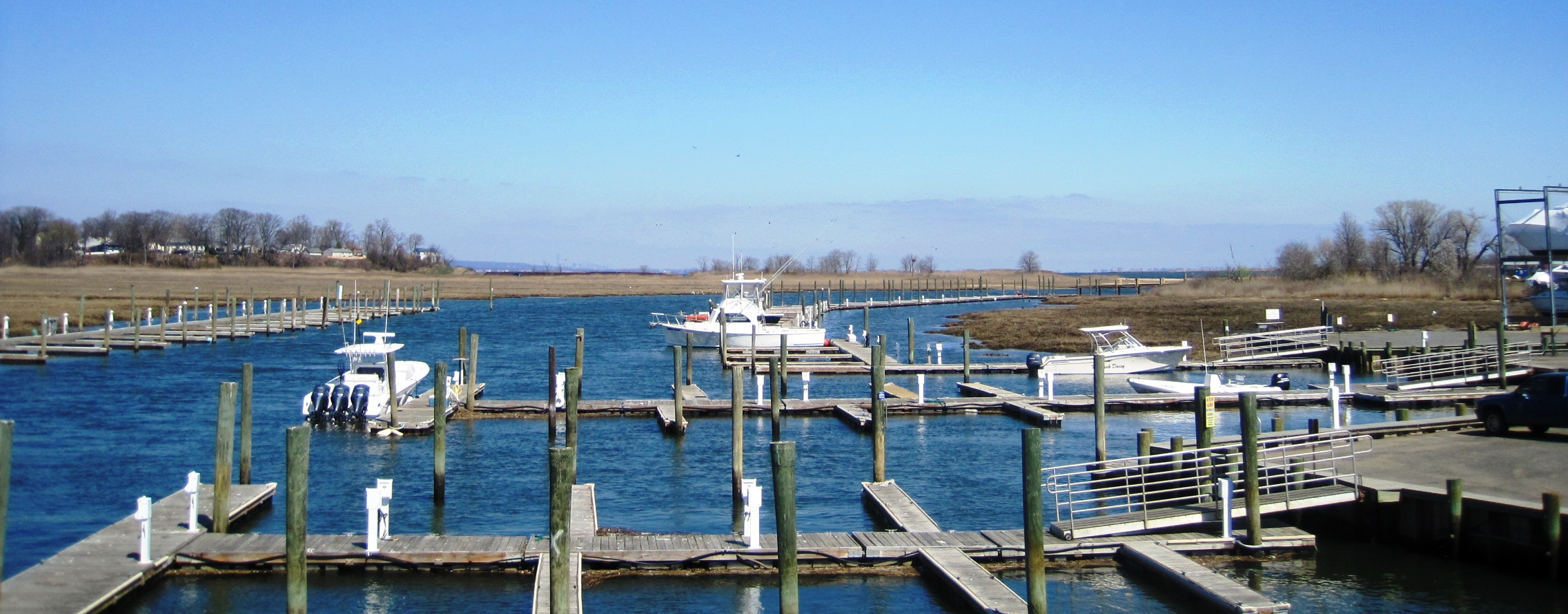
- Mouth of Matawan Creek at the border of Keyport borough and Aberdeen Township

- Seal
- Interactive map of Aberdeen Township, New Jersey
- Location in Monmouth County Location in New Jersey Location in the United States
- Coordinates: 40.430068°N 74.225075°W
- Country: United States
- State: New Jersey
- County: Monmouth
- Incorporated: February 23, 1857, as Matavan Township
- Renamed: 1882 as Matawan Township
- Renamed: November 8, 1977, as Aberdeen Township

Government
  - Type: Faulkner Act (council–manager)
  - Body: Township Council
  - Mayor: Greg Cannon (D, term ends December 31, 2029)
  - Manager: Bryan A. Russell
  - Municipal clerk: Melissa Pfeifer

Area
  - Total: 7.77 sq mi (20.13 km^{2})
  - Land: 5.44 sq mi (14.10 km^{2})
  - Water: 2.33 sq mi (6.03 km^{2}) 29.95%
  - Rank: 234th of 565 in state 15th of 53 in county
- Elevation: 13 ft (4.0 m)

Population (2020)
  - Total: 19,329
  - Estimate (2023): 19,230
  - Rank: 143rd of 565 in state 11th of 53 in county
  - Density: 3,550.2/sq mi (1,370.7/km^{2})
  - Rank: 189th of 565 in state 20th of 53 in county
- Time zone: UTC−05:00 (Eastern (EST))
  - Summer (DST): UTC−04:00 (Eastern (EDT))
- ZIP Code: 07747 - Aberdeen; 07721 - Cliffwood; 07735 - Cliffwood Beach
- Area codes: 732
- FIPS code: 3402500070
- GNIS feature ID: 0882121
- Website: aberdeennj.org

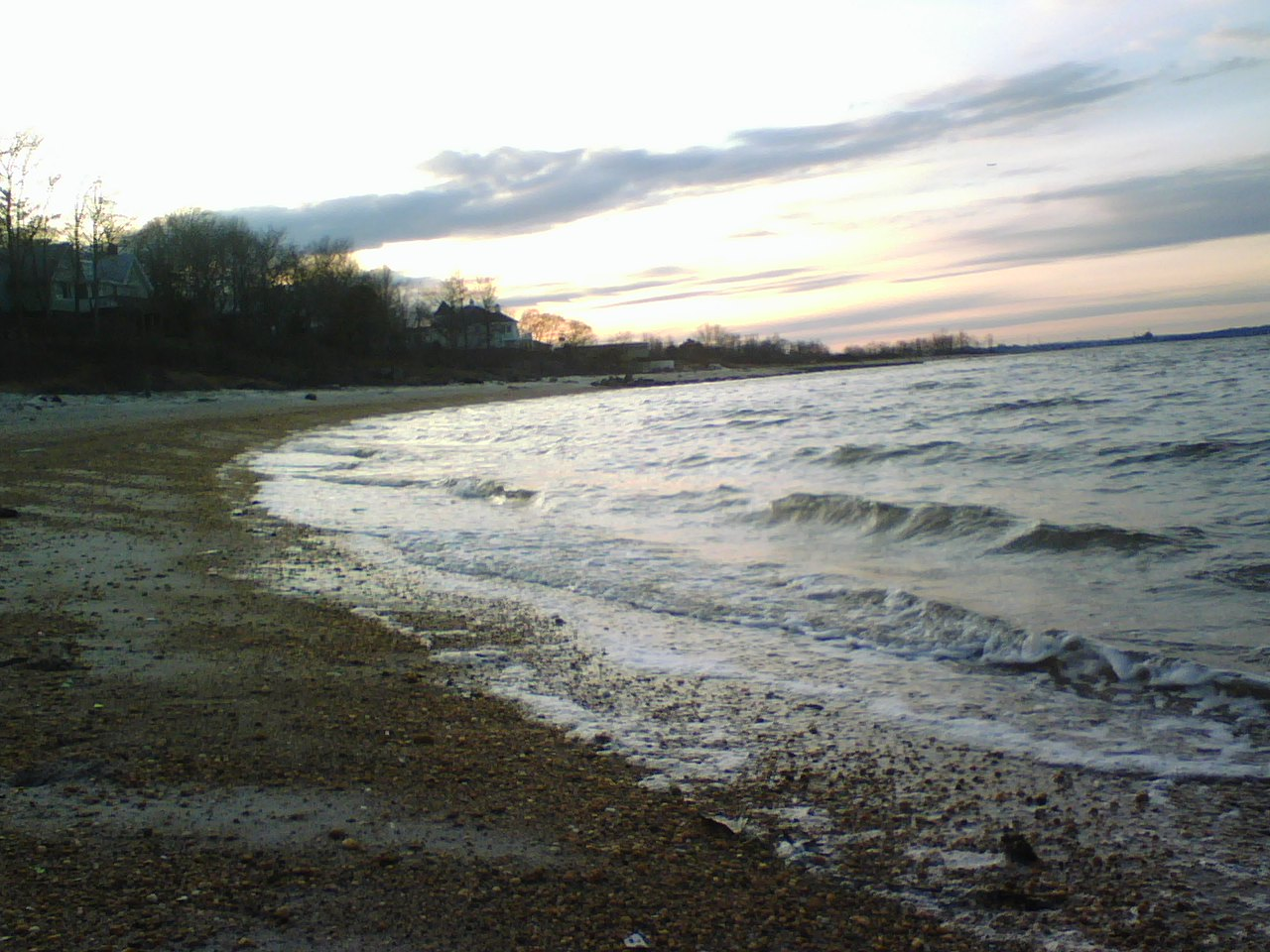
Cliffwood Beach, located in Aberdeen Township, was a popular resort until multiple hurricanes from 1954 through 1960 destroyed its boardwalk and amusement areas. The beach has reverted to its natural state.

Aberdeen Township is a township in Monmouth County, in the U.S. state of New Jersey. The township abuts the Jersey Shore and is located within the Raritan Valley region. Part of the New York metropolitan area, the township both Old Bridge Township, in adjacent Middlesex County, New Jersey, as well as Staten Island in New York City. As of the 2020 United States census, the township's population was 19,329, its highest decennial count ever and an increase of 1,119 (+6.1%) from the 2010 census count of 18,210, which had in turn reflected an increase of 756 (+4.3%) from the 17,454 recorded at the 2000 census.

Aberdeen Township was part of the Bayshore Regional Strategic Plan, an effort by nine municipalities in northern Monmouth County to reinvigorate the area's economy by emphasizing the traditional downtowns, residential neighborhoods, maritime history, and natural environment of the Raritan Bay coastline. The plan has since been integrated into the county's 2016 Master Plan. Aberdeen has worked with neighboring Matawan to build transit-oriented development around the Aberdeen-Matawan train station.

== History ==
=== Origins ===
Those who settled in this area developed into the Lenni Lenape Native Americans. About the year 1000, an agricultural society developed, and small villages dotted what was to become New Jersey. The Lenape began a westward retreat in the face of European settlement and disease beginning in the late seventeenth century, beginning in Monmouth County by the mid-eighteenth century. Although the Lenape presently live in Ontario and Oklahoma, their legacy survives in such names as Mohingson, Luppatatong and Matawan Creeks and Raritan Bay.

The earliest known attempt at European settlement was in 1650 when the south side of Raritan Bay was purchased from the Lenni Lenape by the New Netherland Colony.

=== New Jersey ===
The earliest English land grant in New Aberdeen was in 1677 when Sir George Carteret granted 36 acres (150,000 m^{2}) to Jonathan Holmes. This is in present-day Oakshades on Mohingson Creek.

Matawan Township changed its name in 1977 to Aberdeen Township, which harkened back to the name of the portion of Monmouth County referred to by Scottish settlers as "New Aberdeen." New Aberdeen included the Northern portions of Monmouth County in the 1680s settled by Quakers and Presbyterians who fled Scotland to avoid religious persecution.

In 1684, Surveyor General Thomas Rudyard received a grant of 1,038 acres (4.20 km^{2}) on Raritan Bay and Matawan Creek, the present location of Cliffwood and Cliffwood Beach. Owing to Rudyard's high office, this was quite controversial, and in 1685, the Board of Proprietors issued an order regarding the laying out of land. Section 7 addressed questionable activity such as Rudyard's, and he sold his land to his son-in-law, Samuel Winder.

The 1680s saw an influx of Scottish immigrants fleeing religious persecution in response to a 1683 book by George Scott extolling the virtues of Scottish settlement in East Jersey. In 1701, a village site of 100 acres (0.40 km^{2}) was granted by the Proprietors to 24 Scottish settlers of the area. These men and six others also purchased a landing site on Matawan Creek. The village site eventually came to be called Mount Pleasant, and the landing, as it became an important shipping point for the produce of Middletown Township, became Middletown Point. A third, very scattered settlement developed in the eighteenth century west of Matawan Creek, and was called Matawan or Matavan.

=== Middletown Township ===
In 1693, what was to become Aberdeen Township became part of Middletown Township which, at the time, consisted of what is now Aberdeen, Holmdel Township, Hazlet Township, Middletown (including Sandy Hook), Matawan Borough, Keyport, Union Beach, Keansburg, Atlantic Highlands, Highlands and a sliver of Colts Neck Township. A portion of the township that extended as far northwest as Cheesequake Creek, was ceded to Middlesex County in 1710.

=== Raritan Township ===
Middletown was considered too large and unwieldy, and legislation was passed in February 1848 that took the western half of Middletown Township to create a new municipality, Raritan Township (now Hazlet Township).

=== Matawan Township ===
Legislation sponsored by Assemblyman Beers passed the State General Assembly and Senate, was signed by Governor of New Jersey William A. Newell, and on February 23, 1857, Matavan Township was incorporated from portions of what was then Raritan Township. This included the village of Middletown Point, Mt. Pleasant, and Matavan. The Township was named for the creek as well as the village of Matavan. The spelling of "Matawan" or "Matavan" had been interchangeable, however, when the act was published "Matavan" had been used, which may derive from a Lenape word meaning "where two rivers come together". It may also originate from the Southern Unami Matawonge, "bad riverbank" or "bad hill", a possible reference to bluffs along Raritan Bay which were subject to erosion and collapse prior to the construction of a seawall in the 1970s. Another possible source is Matawan, Northern Unami for "bad fog", which may have referred to fog generated on Raritan Bay.

In 1865, due to postal confusion with Middletown, the Middletown Point post office was renamed "Matawan", to reflect the name of the Township. This section is the present downtown area of Matawan Borough. In 1882, the spelling of the Township was officially changed to "Matawan".

A small railroad station was erected along the New York and Long Branch Railroad tracks at a point called Hutchler's Crossing in 1875. Soon known as the Cliffwood Station, it operated on Cliffwood Avenue until the station closed in 1932.

In 1885, the Cliffwood post office was established and the name of the old Matavan settlement passed into obsolescence. Matawan was formed as a borough on June 28, 1895, from portions of Matawan Township, based on the results of a referendum held that day. Matawan expanded with portions of Matawan Township in 1931 and 1933.

In response to demand, a post office was established at Mount Pleasant in 1889. As that name was in use elsewhere, a new name was needed. "Freneau" was chosen, in honor of Philip Morin Freneau, the "Poet of Revolution," and a former Mount Pleasant resident who is buried in the area. This post office has since been closed.

Cliffwood Beach, formed in the 1920s, was originally a resort community until after World War II when year-round homes were the norm. River Gardens developed in the late 1940s. Strathmore, was built starting in the early 1960s by Levitt & Sons, marketed as a higher-end version of the Levittown communities that the firm was known for. The 2,000 new homes in the development led to a jump in the township's population of 10,000 over the decade, a jump of more than 140%.

=== Aberdeen Township ===
On November 8, 1977, the residents of Matawan Township voted to change the name of the Township to create a community identity separate from that of Matawan Borough. The residents voted to call their community Aberdeen Township. Officials believed the new name would draw attention to the Township, as it is listed first alphabetically among New Jersey's municipalities.

Today, Aberdeen is a suburban township of 5.4 square miles (14 km^{2}) containing a mix of residential, light industry and shopping centers. Sections of the township include Cliffwood, Cliffwood Beach, Freneau, Oakshades, River Gardens, Strathmore, Santa Fe Junction and Woodfield. Three postal ZIP Codes serve the township: 07721, 07735, and 07747.

The Township is served by two volunteer fire companies, the Aberdeen Township Hose and Chemical Co. No. 1, organized in 1918, and the Cliffwood Volunteer Fire Co., organized in 1927. The Aberdeen Township Hose and Chemical Co. No. 1 marked its 100th anniversary on June 10, 2018, with a celebration at Lloyd Road Park and a parade along Lloyd Road. Two volunteer First Aid Squads response to the community's emergency medical needs; the Aberdeen Township First Aid and Rescue Squad, organized in 1954, and the South Aberdeen Emergency Medical Service, organized in 1970. A full-time Police Department was established in 1935.

The Henry Hudson Trail is a 9-mile (14 km) paved trail built on a former Central Railroad of New Jersey right-of-way and extending from Aberdeen Township east to Atlantic Highlands.

== Geography ==
According to the United States Census Bureau, the township had a total area of 7.77 square miles (20.13 km^{2}), including 5.45 square miles (14.10 km^{2}) of land and 2.33 square miles (6.03 km^{2}) of water (29.95%).

The township is broken into two non-contiguous sections, with a small wedge-shaped exclave on the township's southwest corner separated from the rest of the township by a portion of Matawan on the opposite side of Route 79.

Cliffwood Beach (2010 Census population of 3,194) and Strathmore (2010 population of 7,258) are unincorporated communities and census-designated places (CDPs) located within Aberdeen Township. Other unincorporated communities within Aberdeen Township include Cliffwood and Henningers Mills.

The township borders Hazlet Township, Holmdel Township, Keansburg, Keyport, Marlboro Township and Matawan in Monmouth County; and Old Bridge Township in Middlesex County. The township has a maritime border with the borough of Staten Island in New York City.

== Demographics ==
Historical population
Census	Pop.	Note	%±
1860	2,072		—
1870	2,839		37.0%
1880	2,699		−4.9%
1890	1,092		−59.5%
1900	1,310		20.0%
1910	1,472		12.4%
1920	1,856		26.1%
1930	2,496		34.5%
1940	2,633		5.5%
1950	3,888		47.7%
1960	7,359		89.3%
1970	17,680		140.3%
1980	17,235		−2.5%
1990	17,038		−1.1%
2000	17,454		2.4%
2010	18,210		4.3%
2020	19,329		6.1%
2023 (est.)	19,230		−0.5%
Population sources: 1860–1920 1860–1870; 1870 1880–1890; 1890–1910 1910–1930; 1940–2000 2000; 2010 2020

=== 2010 census ===
The 2010 United States census counted 18,210 people, 6,876 households, and 4,923 families in the township. The population density was 3,343.0 per square mile (1,290.7/km^{2}). There were 7,102 housing units at an average density of 1,303.8 per square mile (503.4/km^{2}). The racial makeup was 76.63% (13,954) White, 11.87% (2,161) Black or African American, 0.23% (41) Native American, 6.43% (1,171) Asian, 0.04% (8) Pacific Islander, 2.77% (504) from other races, and 2.04% (371) from two or more races. Hispanic or Latino of any race were 10.43% (1,900) of the population.

Of the 6,876 households, 32.5% had children under the age of 18; 56.0% were married couples living together; 11.7% had a female householder with no husband present and 28.4% were non-families. Of all households, 22.5% were made up of individuals and 6.0% had someone living alone who was 65 years of age or older. The average household size was 2.64 and the average family size was 3.13.

23.1% of the population were under the age of 18, 7.4% from 18 to 24, 29.3% from 25 to 44, 29.6% from 45 to 64, and 10.6% who were 65 years of age or older. The median age was 39.0 years. For every 100 females, the population had 94.9 males. For every 100 females ages 18 and older there were 92.0 males.

The Census Bureau's 2006–2010 American Community Survey showed that (in 2010 inflation-adjusted dollars) median household income was $89,365 (with a margin of error of +/− $4,048) and the median family income was $101,174 (+/− $5,850). Males had a median income of $65,488 (+/− $5,575) versus $52,615 (+/− $3,635) for females. The per capita income for the borough was $39,830 (+/− $3,017). About 2.6% of families and 5.0% of the population were below the poverty line, including 4.6% of those under age 18 and 9.0% of those age 65 or over.

=== 2000 census ===
As of the 2000 United States census there were 17,454 people, 6,421 households, and 4,770 families residing in the township. The population density was 3,152.2 inhabitants per square mile (1,217.1/km^{2}). There were 6,558 housing units at an average density of 1,184.4 per square mile (457.3/km^{2}). The racial makeup of the township was 78.82% White, 12.02% African American, 0.14% Native American, 5.51% Asian, 0.01% Pacific Islander, 1.75% from other races, and 1.75% from two or more races. Hispanic or Latino of any race were 7.02% of the population.

There were 6,421 households, out of which 34.4% had children under the age of 18 living with them, 60.2% were married couples living together, 10.5% had a female householder with no husband present, and 25.7% were non-families. 20.2% of all households were made up of individuals, and 5.0% had someone living alone who was 65 years of age or older. The average household size was 2.70 and the average family size was 3.14.

In the township the population was spread out, with 24.5% under the age of 18, 6.2% from 18 to 24, 35.0% from 25 to 44, 24.0% from 45 to 64, and 10.4% who were 65 years of age or older. The median age was 37 years. For every 100 females, there were 95.1 males. For every 100 females age 18 and over, there were 92.4 males.

The median income for a household in the township was $68,125, and the median income for a family was $76,648. Males had a median income of $51,649 versus $35,707 for females. The per capita income for the township was $28,984. About 3.8% of families and 4.7% of the population were below the poverty line, including 7.1% of those under age 18 and 4.6% of those age 65 or over.

== Government ==
=== Local government ===
The township operates within the Faulkner Act under the Council-Manager form of government (Plan 3), implemented in its current form based on a direct petition as of January 1, 1990; the citizens of Aberdeen Township voted in November 1964 to change from the traditional Township Committee form of government, which had been in force since 1857. The township is one of 42 municipalities (of the 564) statewide that use this form of government. The governing body is comprised of the Mayor and the Township Council. In this Council-Manager form, all policy making power is concentrated in the council. The Mayor is a member of the council and presides over its meetings. The Manager, appointed by and reporting to the council, is the chief executive and oversees the day-to-day operation of the borough. A seven-member Township Council is elected at large for staggered, four-year terms of office in partisan elections held every in odd-numbered years as part of the November general election; four seats are up together, followed two years later by the mayoral seat and the two other council seats. The mayor is directly elected, while the council selects a deputy mayor from among its members.

As of 2024, the Mayor of Aberdeen Township is Democrat Fred Tagliarini, whose term of office ends December 31, 2025. Members of the Aberdeen Township Council are Deputy Mayor Margaret Montone (D, 2025), Greg J. Cannon (D, 2027), Arthur S. Hirsch (D, 2027), Concetta B. Kelley (D, 2027), Joseph J. Martucci Sr. (D, 2025) and Robert L. Swindle (D, 2027).

=== Federal, state and county representation ===
Aberdeen Township is located in the 6th Congressional district and is part of New Jersey's 13th state legislative district.

For the 119th United States Congress, New Jersey's 6th congressional district is represented by Frank Pallone (D, Long Branch). New Jersey is represented in the United States Senate by Democrats Cory Booker (Newark, term ends 2027) and Andy Kim (Moorestown, term ends 2031).

For the 2026–2027 session, the 13th legislative district of the New Jersey Legislature is represented in the New Jersey Senate by Declan O'Scanlon (R, Little Silver) and in the General Assembly by Vicky Flynn (R, Holmdel Township) and Gerard Scharfenberger (R, Middletown Township).

Monmouth County is governed by a Board of County Commissioners composed of five members who are elected at-large to serve three-year terms of office on a staggered basis, with either one or two seats up for election each year as part of the November general election. At an annual reorganization meeting held in the beginning of January, the board selects one of its members to serve as director and another as deputy director.

As of 2025, Monmouth County's Commissioners are Director Thomas A. Arnone (R, Neptune City, 2025), Susan M. Kiley (R, Hazlet Township, 2027), Erik Anderson (R, Shrewsbury, 2026), Nick DiRocco (R, Wall Township, 2025), and Deputy Director Ross F. Licitra (R, Marlboro Township, 2026).

Constitutional officers elected on a countywide basis are Clerk Christine Giordano Hanlon (R, 2025; Ocean Township), Sheriff Shaun Golden (R, 2025; Howell Township) and Surrogate Rosemarie D. Peters (R, 2026; Middletown Township).

=== Politics ===
United States presidential election results for Aberdeen
Year	Republican		Democratic		Third party(ies)	
Year	No.	%	No.	%	No.	%
2024	5,600	51.51%	5,087	46.79%	185	1.70%
2020	5,021	44.99%	5,989	53.66%	150	1.34%
2016	4,126	47.22%	4,328	49.53%	284	3.25%
2012	3,054	42.14%	4,109	56.69%	85	1.17%
2008	3,817	44.70%	4,635	54.27%	88	1.03%
2004	3,644	46.62%	4,105	52.52%	67	0.86%
2000	2,559	35.95%	4,262	59.88%	297	4.17%
1996	2,136	31.97%	3,912	58.55%	634	9.49%
1992	2,857	38.94%	3,352	45.69%	1,128	15.37%

As of March 2011, there were a total of 11,162 registered voters in Aberdeen Township, of which 3,145 (28.2%) were registered as Democrats, 1,988 (17.8%) were registered as Republicans and 6,021 (53.9%) were registered as Unaffiliated. There were 8 voters registered as Libertarians or Greens.

The township had been reliably Democratic in federal elections until Republican Donald Trump won it by 51.5% (5,600 votes) in the 2024 United States presidential election. This was the first time a Republican candidate had won Aberdeen Township and achieved over 50% of votes cast since at least 1992. Republican United States Senate candidate Curtis Bashaw simultaneously won the township with 49.4% of the vote (5, 124). In the 2020 presidential election, Democrat Joe Biden received 53.7% of the vote (5,989 votes), ahead of Republican Donald Trump with 45% (5,021 votes), and other candidates receiving 1.3% (150 votes), among 11,160 votes cast by the township's 14,130 voters for a turnout 80%. In the 2016 presidential election, Democrat Hillary Clinton received 49.5% of the vote (4,328 votes), ahead of Republican Donald Trump with 47.2% (4,126 votes), and other candidates receiving 3.3% (284 votes), among 8,738 votes cast. In the 2012 presidential election, Democrat Barack Obama received 56.7% of the vote (4,109 cast), ahead of Republican Mitt Romney with 42.1% (3,054 votes), and other candidates with 1.2% (85 votes), among the 7,298 ballots cast by the township's 11,602 registered voters (50 ballots were spoiled), for a turnout of 62.9%.

Gubernatorial election results for Abeerdeen Township
Year	Republican		Democratic		Third party(ies)	
Year	No.	%	No.	%	No.	%
2025	4,075	47.46%	4,463	51.97%	49	0.57%
2021	3,554	52.67%	3,147	46.64%	47	0.70%
2017	2,418	47.23%	2,583	50.45%	119	2.32%
2013	3,085	64.78%	1,603	33.66%	74	1.55%
2009	3,140	56.36%	2,046	36.73%	385	6.91%
2005	2,277	45.06%	2,533	50.13%	243	4.81%

In the 2017 gubernatorial election, Democrat Phil Murphy received 50.5% (2,583 votes), ahead of Republican Kim Guadagno with 47.2% (2,418 votes), and other candidates receiving 2.3% (119 votes). In the 2013 gubernatorial election, Republican Chris Christie received 64.8% of the vote (3,085 cast), ahead of Democrat Barbara Buono with 33.7% (1,603 votes), and other candidates with 1.6% (74 votes), among the 4,814 ballots cast by the township's 11,686 registered voters (52 ballots were spoiled), for a turnout of 41.2%. In the 2009 gubernatorial election, Republican Chris Christie received 55.7% of the vote (3,140 ballots cast), ahead of Democrat Jon Corzine with 36.3% (2,048 votes), Independent Chris Daggett with 5.7% (322 votes) and other candidates with 1.1% (63 votes), among the 5,642 ballots cast by the township's 11,371 registered voters, yielding a 49.6% turnout.

United States Senate election results for Abeerdeen Township1
Year	Republican		Democratic		Third party(ies)	
Year	No.	%	No.	%	No.	%
2024	5,124	49.51%	4,973	48.05%	253	2.44%
2018	3,194	45.51%	3,580	51.00%	245	3.49%
2012	3,010	44.04%	3,708	54.25%	117	1.71%
2006	1,934	43.30%	2,402	53.77%	131	2.93%

United States Senate election results for East Windsor2
Year	Republican		Democratic		Third party(ies)	
Year	No.	%	No.	%	No.	%
2020	4,938	44.75%	5,880	53.29%	217	1.97%
2014	1,576	42.83%	2,042	55.49%	62	1.68%
2013	1,315	46.83%	1,456	51.85%	37	1.32%
2008	3,350	42.81%	4,250	54.31%	225	2.88%

== Education ==
Aberdeen Township is part of the Matawan-Aberdeen Regional School District, together with the neighboring community of Matawan. The district is a comprehensive system with seven schools, which includes one preschool for pre-kindergarten and kindergarten, three elementary schools for grades PreK–3, one school for grades 4–5, one middle school for grades 6–8 and a high school for grades 9–12. As of the 2022–23 school year, the district, comprised of seven schools, had an enrollment of 3,950 students and 352.3 classroom teachers (on an FTE basis), for a student–teacher ratio of 11.2:1. Schools in the district (with 2022–23 enrollment data from the National Center for Education Statistics) are Cambridge Park Elementary School with 266 students in grades PreK–K, Cliffwood Elementary School with 369 students in grades PreK–3, Ravine Drive Elementary School with 399 students in grades PreK–3, Strathmore Elementary School with 461 students in grades PreK–3, Lloyd Road Elementary School with 528 students in grades 4–5, Matawan Aberdeen Middle School with 795 students in grades 6–8 and Matawan Regional High School with 1,154 students in grades 9–12. The MARSD Central Offices are located at 1 Crest Way, in Aberdeen. Seats on the district's nine-member board of education are allocated based on the population of the constituent municipalities, with six assigned to Aberdeen Township.

The township is home to the Yeshiva Gedolah of Cliffwood, which is listed as a higher education institution by the New Jersey Office of the Secretary of Higher Education.

== Transportation ==
=== Roads and highways ===
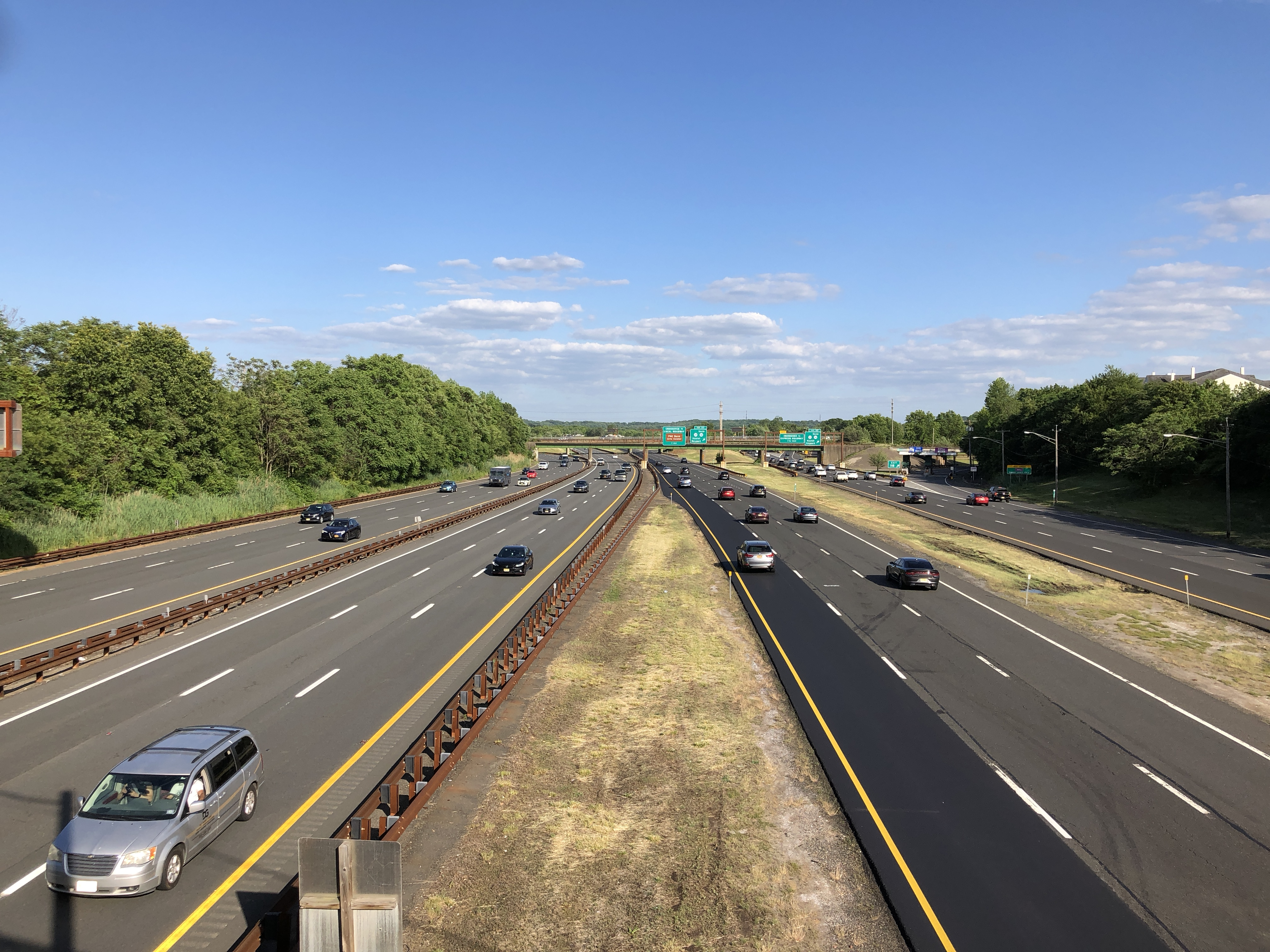
The Garden State Parkway in Aberdeen

As of May 2010, the township had a total of 65.76 miles (105.83 km) of roadways, of which 55.74 miles (89.70 km) were maintained by the municipality, 5.35 miles (8.61 km) by Monmouth County, 2.69 miles (4.33 km) by the New Jersey Department of Transportation and 1.98 miles (3.19 km) by the New Jersey Turnpike Authority.

The Garden State Parkway is the largest highway in Aberdeen, with exit 118 in the township. Route 34 passes through in the southern area of the township, while Route 35 runs through the northern area.

=== Public transportation ===
NJ Transit provides bus transportation between the township and the Port Authority Bus Terminal in Midtown Manhattan via the 133, which also stops in Old Bridge and Matawan, and the 135, which also stops in Freehold, Marlboro, and Matawan. Additionally, the 817 route, which operates between Middletown Township and Perth Amboy, also stops in Keansburg, Hazlet, Union Beach, Keyport, Old Bridge Township and South Amboy.

Rail service is available at the Aberdeen-Matawan station, located in Aberdeen. The station is served by the NJ Transit North Jersey Coast Line, with service north to New York Penn Station and south to Bay Head station.

== Notable people ==
People who were born in, residents of, or otherwise closely associated with Aberdeen Township include:

- Jay Bellamy (born 1972), safety who played in the NFL for the Seattle Seahawks and New Orleans Saints
- Andrew Bowne (c. 1638 – c. 1708), colonial politician and jurist
- Anthony Brown (born 1998), American football quarterback for the Las Vegas Raiders of the NFL
- Philip N. Gumbs (1923–2005), who served on the Monmouth County Board of Chosen Freeholders
- Erison Hurtault (born 1984), sprinter who has represented Dominica in international events
- Jodi Lyn O'Keefe (born 1978), actress and model, who at age 17 portrayed Cassidy Bridges on Nash Bridges
- Thomas J. Powers, politician who served on the Monmouth County Board of Chosen Freeholders and as Mayor of Aberdeen Township
- Retta (born 1970), comedian and actress, best known for her roles of Donna Meagle on NBC's Parks and Recreation and Ruby Hill on NBC's Good Girls
- Charlie Rogers (born 1976), former NFL running back and wide receiver who played for the Seattle Seahawks, Buffalo Bills and Miami Dolphins
- David L. Smith, creator of the Melissa computer virus first identified in March 1999. Smith was sentenced in 2002 to serve 20 months in a federal prison
- Eileen Tell (born 1966), former professional tennis player
