= Southern Accent (newspaper) =

The Southern Accent
- Type: Weekly newspaper
- Format: Tabloid
- Owner: Southern Adventist University
- Former name: The Southland Scroll
- Founded: 1926 (as The Southland Scroll); 1945 (in current form)
- Headquarters: 4880 Taylor Circle; Collegedale, TN, United States
- Circulation: 2,000 Weekly
- Website: Accent.Southern.edu

The Southern Accent is the weekly student-run newspaper at Southern Adventist University. The first issue was published in 1926 as The Southland Scroll, and became the school's first paper from 1929 until 1945, when it changed to its current name.
