= Matawan-Aberdeen Regional School District =

School district in Monmouth County, New Jersey, US

Address
- 1 Crest Way Aberdeen Township, Monmouth County, New Jersey, 07747; United States
- Coordinates: 40.411042°N 74.239377°W

District information
- Grades: K-12
- Superintendent: Nelyda Perez
- Business administrator: Lindsey Case
- Schools: 7

Students and staff
- Enrollment: 3,950 (as of 2022–23)
- Faculty: 352.3 FTEs
- Student–teacher ratio: 11.2:1

Other information
- District Factor Group: FG
- Website: www.marsd.org
Ind.	Per pupil	District spending	Rank (*)	K-12 average	%± vs. average
1A	Total Spending	$17,443	35	$18,891	−7.7%
1	Budgetary Cost	13,430	31	14,783	−9.2%
2	Classroom Instruction	8,279	32	8,763	−5.5%
6	Support Services	1,903	25	2,392	−20.4%
8	Administrative Cost	1,385	40	1,485	−6.7%
10	Operations & Maintenance	1,373	22	1,783	−23.0%
13	Extracurricular Activities	358	92	268	33.6%
16	Median Teacher Salary	62,200	35	64,043
Data from NJDoE 2014 Taxpayers' Guide to Education Spending. *Of K-12 districts with more than 3,500 students. Lowest spending=1; Highest=103

The Matawan-Aberdeen Regional School District is a regional public school district in Monmouth County, in the U.S. state of New Jersey. The district serves students for pre-kindergarten through twelfth grade from the communities of Aberdeen Township and Matawan Borough. The district is a comprehensive system with seven schools, which includes one preschool for pre-kindergarten and kindergarten, three elementary schools for grades PreK–3, one school for grades 4–5, one middle school for grades 6–8 and a high school for grades 9–12.

As of the 2022–23 school year, the district, comprised of seven schools, had an enrollment of 3,950 students and 352.3 classroom teachers (on an FTE basis), for a student–teacher ratio of 11.2:1.

The district is classified by the New Jersey Department of Education as being in District Factor Group "FG", the fourth-highest of eight groupings. District Factor Groups organize districts statewide to allow comparison by common socioeconomic characteristics of the local districts. From lowest socioeconomic status to highest, the categories are A, B, CD, DE, FG, GH, I and J.

The Matawan-Aberdeen Regional School District Central Offices are located at 1 Crest Way, in Aberdeen.

== History ==
In 2015, New Jersey Superior Court judge David F. Bauman dismissed a case filed against the district filed by a student of the district and by the American Humanist Association that argued that a discriminatory climate was created by the inclusion of the phrase "under God" in the Pledge of Allegiance recited by students, making non-believers "second-class citizens" by elevating religious belief. He noted; "As a matter of historical tradition, the words 'under God' can no more be expunged from the national consciousness than the words 'In God We Trust' from every coin in the land, than the words 'so help me God' from every presidential oath since 1789, or than the prayer that has opened every congressional session of legislative business since 1787."

== Schools ==
Schools in the district (with 2022–23 enrollment data from the National Center for Education Statistics) are:

Preschool

- Cambridge Park Elementary School with 266 students in grades PreK–K
  - Kelly Bera, principal

Elementary schools

- Cliffwood Elementary School with 369 students in grades PreK–3
  - Christine Cherence, principal
- Ravine Drive Elementary School with 399 students in grades PreK–3
  - Sean D. Cronin, principal
- Strathmore Elementary School with 461 students in grades PreK–3
  - Joseph Jerabek, principal
- Lloyd Road Elementary School with 528 students in grades 4–5
  - John Bombardier, principal

Middle school

- Matawan Aberdeen Middle School with 795 students in grades 6–8
  - Mark Van Horn, principal

High school

- Matawan Regional High School with 1,154 students in grades 9-12
  - Michael C. Wells, principal

== Administration ==
Core members of the district's administration are:

- Nelyda Perez, superintendent of schools
- Lindsey Case, business administrator and board secretary

== Board of education ==
The district's board of education, comprised of nine members, sets policy and oversees the fiscal and educational operation of the district through its administration. As a Type II school district, the board's trustees are elected directly by voters to serve three-year terms of office on a staggered basis, with three seats up for election each year held (since 2012) as part of the November general election. The board appoints a superintendent to oversee the district's day-to-day operations and a business administrator to supervise the business functions of the district. Seats on the district's board of education are allocated based on the population of the constituent municipalities, with six assigned to Aberdeen Township and three to Matawan.
