= Cliffwood, New Jersey =

Place in Monmouth County, New Jersey, United States

- Unincorporated community
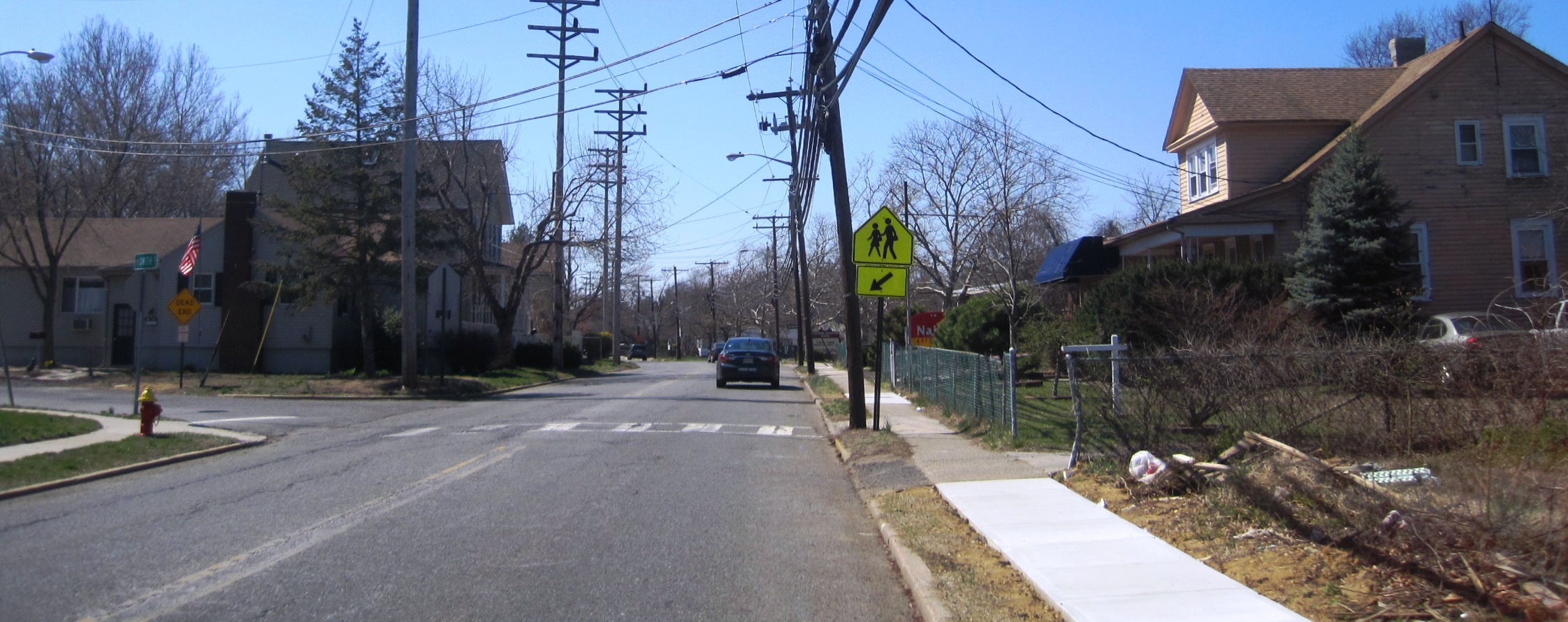
- Cliffwood as seen from Cliffwood Avenue (CR 6A)

- Location in Monmouth County (Inset: Monmouth County in New Jersey) Cliffwood (New Jersey) Cliffwood (the United States)
- Coordinates: 40°26′12″N 74°14′23″W
- Country: United States
- State: New Jersey
- County: Monmouth
- Township: Aberdeen
- Elevation: 62 ft (19 m)

Population (2010 Census)
  - Total: 2,974
- ZIP code: 07721
- GNIS feature ID: 0875496

Cliffwood is an unincorporated community located within Aberdeen Township in Monmouth County, New Jersey, United States. The area is served as United States Postal Service ZIP code 07721.

As of the 2010 United States census, the population for ZIP Code Tabulation Area 07721 was 2,974.

== Geography ==
Cliffwood is located southwest of Route 35 and is bounded by Matawan on the south and Old Bridge Township on the northwest. Matawan Creek borders Cliffwood to the southeast. River Gardens, a community along Matawan Creek, is served by Zip Code 07735.

== Education ==
Cliffwood, as a part of Aberdeen, is served by the Matawan-Aberdeen Regional School District. The MARSD Central Offices are located at 1 Crest Way, in Aberdeen.

Cliffwood is home to Cliffwood Elementary School. On January 26, 1855, tobacco magnate David Hunter McAlpin sold 0.5 acres (0.20 ha) of land for $50.00 to the Trustees of the Matavan School District No. 1. for school purposes. This remains a part of the campus of the Cliffwood Elementary School. The Matawan Aberdeen Middle School is also located in Cliffwood.

== Notable people ==
People who were born in, residents of, or otherwise closely associated with Cliffwood include:

- Jay Bellamy (born 1972), safety who played in the NFL for the Seattle Seahawks and New Orleans Saints.
- Anthony Brown (born 1998), American football quarterback for the Oregon Ducks.
