= Avenel station =

NJ Transit rail station

Avenel
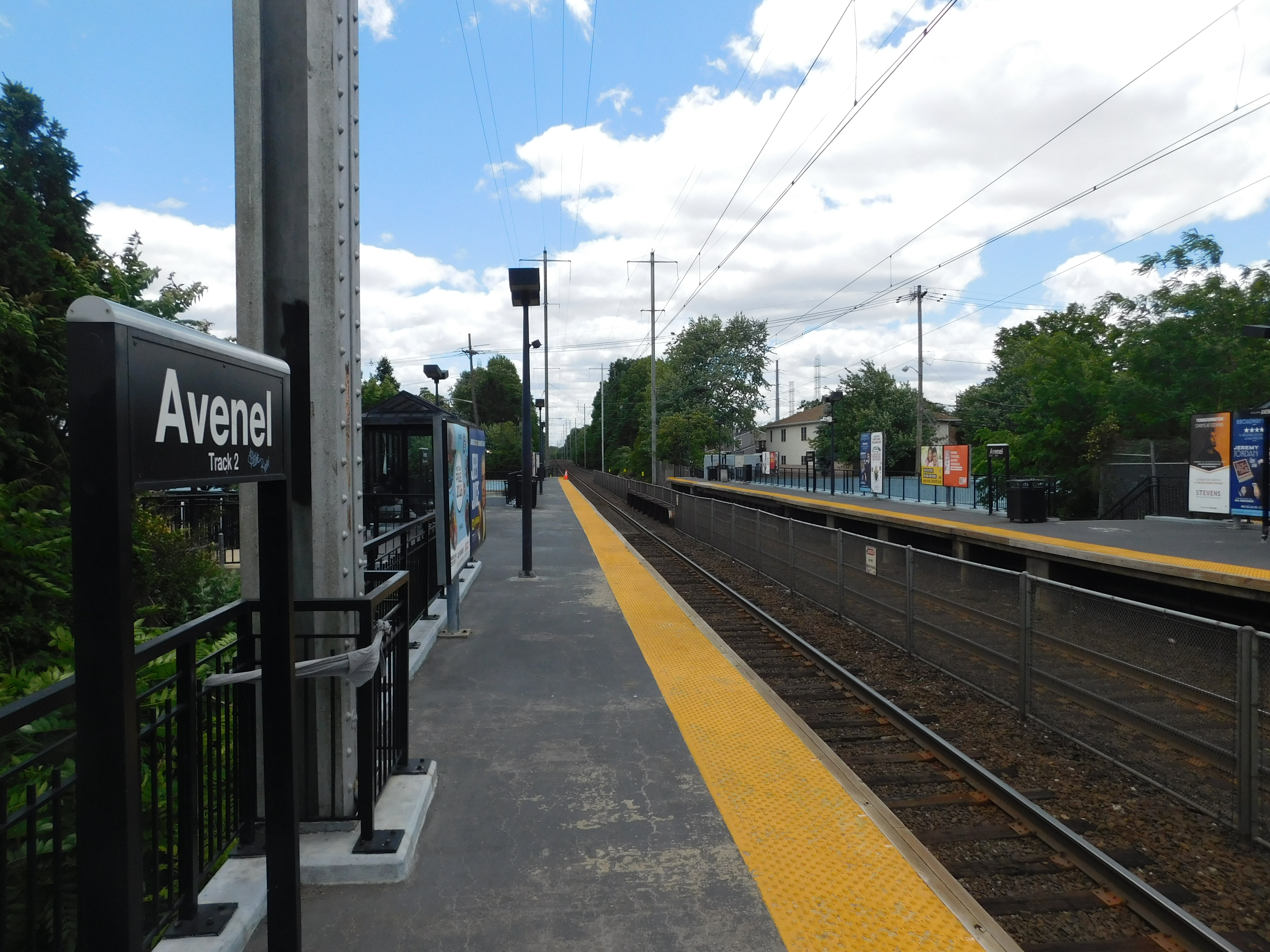
- Avenel station in May 2026.

General information
- Location: Avenel Street (at West Side Avenue; outbound; at East Side Lane; inbound); Woodbridge, New Jersey
- Coordinates: 40°34′42.36″N 74°16′38.14″W
- Owner: New Jersey Transit
- Platforms: 2 side platforms
- Tracks: 2

Construction
- Accessible: Yes

Other information
- Fare zone: 9

History
- Opened: c. 1869
- Rebuilt: June 11, 1998–December 22, 1998

Passengers
- 2025: 275 (average weekday)
- Rank: 88 of 153

Services
Preceding station	NJ Transit	Following station
Woodbridge toward Bay Head	North Jersey Coast Line	Rahway toward New York
Former services
Preceding station	Pennsylvania Railroad	Following station
Edgar toward Perth Amboy	Perth Amboy and Woodbridge Branch	Rahway Terminus
Location

Avenel is an active commuter railroad station in the Avenel section of Woodbridge Township, Middlesex County, New Jersey. Servicing trains of NJ Transit's North Jersey Coast Line, the station serves trains going to Long Branch and Bay Head to New York Penn Station. Avenel station serves as the first (going south) and last (going north) stop of standalone North Jersey Coast Line service, with the line merging into the Northeast Corridor Line at Union Tower in Rahway. The next station to the south is Woodbridge while the next station north is Rahway. Avenel station consists of two high-level side platforms that cross over Avenel Street (County Route 650).

The first train operated through modern-day Avenel on October 11, 1864 with the opening of the Perth Amboy and Woodbridge Railroad, but did not stop in the area. Railroad service was established c. 1869 with the announcement of new realty plots in the area up for auction on June 2. The station depot burned in a fire c. 1896 and was replaced by a two-story stone building. This station stood until the construction of a new bridge over Avenel Street to eliminate a grade crossing in 1937. Lack of maintenance resulted in dropped ridership in the 1970s, 1980s and 1990s, resulting in the proposed closure by NJ Transit in 1992. Efforts by local politicians and riders resulted in Avenel station remaining open. NJ Transit replaced the decrepit structures in 1998 as part of the agreement to keep the station open.

== History ==
=== Early history (1864–1896) ===
Railroad service through Woodbridge Township began with the opening of the Perth Amboy and Woodbridge Railroad, a spur of the New Jersey Railroad from Rahway to Perth Amboy. Construction on the railroad began on July 1, 1858 and was finished in October 1864. The branch opened on October 11 with a steam car and trailer operating service every half-hour between the two eponymous destinations.

The section of Woodbridge Township in modern-day Avenel was known as Demarest on the Hill after the daughter of a local developer, Captain Demarest. In 1867, he proposed a railroad station along the branch named "Avanel" after his daughter. In May 1869, it was announced that 150 plots for new construction were to be auctioned in the area now known as Avenel. They advertised that the plots were available on higher elevation that showed Staten Island and the Watchung Mountains. The Demarest family offered that 10 percent of every sale would go towards the construction of a new railroad station depot and for general maintenance and improvement of the area. They offered the auction on June 2, 1869 and that a train from New York City would be made for interested buyers. Each property would be 50 by 150 feet (15 m × 46 m) and new roads in the Avenel Association would be 60 feet (18 m) wide with the exception of Rahway Avenue, which would be 100 feet (30 m).

The first station depot at Avenel was a wooden frame two-story building with a shingle roof. There was also a small watch house next to the tracks. This building burned down c. 1896 and was replaced by a new station depot. The railroad built a Victorian-style station depot as a replacement for the original building. Also a two-story building, the brick depot also had an apartment on the second floor to serve the station agent and their family. The station also doubled as the Avenel post office.

=== Robbery plot (1924) ===
Police of the Pennsylvania Railroad and Woodbridge Township were waiting at a siding next to Avenel station on May 13, 1924 with the expectation that a group of thieves were going to rob railroad facilities in the area. Operating on a tip, ten officers from the railroad and five officers from the township set up a trap for the trio of attempted lawbreakers: John Francis Hull of Teaneck, Stephen Zampelli of Jersey City operating under an alias of George Rizzo of Newark and Walter Duffy of Union Hill. Hull, who served as a freight yard conductor, changed the direction of a single box car intended for Philadelphia, Pennsylvania to head for a siding at Avenel. The car arrived before the thieves and the police were watching the car. After midnight on May 13, a vehicle was spotted looking at the siding and drove away. Figuring it was safe, a truck appeared at the freight car. Around 4:00 a.m., the thieves began raiding the contents of the box car. Railroad police agreed that they wanted to arrest the trio without any gunshots being fired.

After removing several boxes, the police moved in and demanded they raise their hands. The robbers then drew all of their guns and began firing at the police. Officers returned fire and downed two of the thieves with their bullets. Duffy ended up with nine bullets from the police in his body. Hull suffered a chest wound that entered and exited his body. No officers were hurt during the gun battle, but the two other thieves ran away in the car who had been there the first time. Zampelli was arrested and taken to be arraigned alongside Hull in New Brunswck. Duffy was sent to Rahway Hospital for his injuries.

The trial occurred in New Brunswick on October 8 for the three thieves captured by the police. The officers noted that the thieves had stolen $2,176 of freight from the boxcar, including dolls, revolvers, leather, cigars, notions, dusters, sunglasses and corsets on the back of the truck. The defense of the thieves was that the railroad was framing the three men for the theft and that it was staged. Inspector Andrew Coakley, who was the captain of the railroad police's detectives stated that he got a telephone call on the morning of May 12 about a break-in at a box car in Avenel. The defense attorney questioned Coakley about staging it to prove robberies of box cars in the area. Lieutenant Alexander MacNeil was also grilled about the concept of a frame job, stating that he received a call the night before that a car was going to head to Avenel's siding from Exchange Place. MacNeil added that he saw the car left at Avenel station's siding. He went to the door and checked the bill of sale on the freight door. MacNeil then called his men to watch the boxcar. The defense attorney, George Cutley, asked if they had arranged the robbery with the owner of the truck. The conductor of the freight train, Bill Carson, stated that the seals of the box car's lock were in perfect shape at Exchange Place and at Avenel. Zampelli stated under oath that he was getting money to help on a truck doing "rum running" in the area of Newark and that he was found in the box car after the shooting, rather than being one of the shooters. Hull stated that he was there to purchase a house. However, the prosecutor noted that Hull had modified the bill on the freight car from Philadelphia to Avenel. The jury was out 20 minutes that evening and returned with a guilty verdict.

=== Grade crossing elimination (1934–1937) ===
As part of a municipal desire to eliminate grade crossings in the township, Woodbridge officials petitioned the Board of Public Utility Commissioners to pressure the Pennsylvania Railroad into action in 1934. Woodbridge Township requested the elimination of six crossings, four in downtown Woodbridge and two in Avenel. The death of a student at New Jersey College for Women in New Brunswick while at home with her parents at a grade crossing stimulated local outrage and demands from both the township and the Middlesex County Board of Freeholders. On September 28, 1934, the Board announced that the railroad would have to begin construction of the four downtown crossings after December 1. The two Avenel crossings (Avenel Street and Leesville Avenue) would be pushed back while the railroad discussed alternate plans with the municipality.

Less than year later, the demand for the elimination of the two Avenel crossings returned along with a second trip to the Board of Public Utilities Commission. The Board announced that they have approved a petition from Woodbridge Township and Middlesex County on July 26, 1935. The Leesville Avenue and Avenel Streets would both involve new 40-foot (12 m) roadways. While Leesville Avenue would be done in macadam, the new alignment of Avenel Street would be done in concrete. Both streets would be depressed 14 feet (4.3 m) under the railroad tracks at a combined $303,000 (1935 USD): $193,000 for the work at Avenel Street and $110,000 for the land at Leesville Avenue. At Avenel Street, the new depression would be located directly north of the active grade crossing in order to prevent issues with the daily life and business of those on the street. The Board announced that work had to begin by November 1, 1935 and would be split equally in cost between the Pennsylvania Railroad and the state of New Jersey. They added that the project needed to be finished within six months of the November 1, 1935 order.

On September 5, 1935, Governor Harold G. Hoffman requested that the Board of Public Utility Commissioners begin to speed up work on eliminating grade crossings in New Jersey, with preference to the ones the Board had already ordered the removal of. This included numerous crossings within several parts of Woodbridge Township: Avenel, Iselin, Colonia and downtown Woodbridge. Woodbridge Township officials went to Washington D.C. the same day to request funding from the Works Progress Administration (WPA) to begin construction. The Pennsylvania Railroad had asked for $881,500 in a federal grant request, of which $450,000 would go into the downtown crossings. The WPA stated that they had rejected the application because the majority of the money requested was for land acquisition and materials and not for labor. Woodbridge officials, a newspaper reporter, along with the secretary for Senator W. Warren Barbour pushed the federal government to reconsider their decision. Woodbridge officials noted that the original proposal to the Public Works Administration (PWA) included right-of-way costs and that they would be willing to adjust the demands. The WPA added that they would have to re-apply by September 12 for reconsideration.

Governor Hoffman announced after a meeting with officials of multiple railroads, the Board of Public Utility Commissioners and the New Jersey State Highway Department that the Board demand the beginning of ordered projects. This would include the ten previously approved crossings (including those in Woodbridge) and two new crossings. Governor Hoffman stated that $12 million would be done for the project, in which the state would offer $4.25 million, the federal government would offer $6.25 million in grants and the railroad companies would be at cost for the last $1.5 million. The federal money would come from the Bureau of Public Roads for state highway grade crossings while the other crossings that would involve local or county roads would require their land costs be split by the state and the railroad. The PWA would also provide 45 percent of costs for the materials and labor of the eliminations. The cost for the twelve crossings would total $3.231 million. Hoffman added that he would be willing to study the cost share for each of the previously approved crossings.

In July 1936, the Franklin Delano Roosevelt administration in Washington D.C. announced that they would open more money to the PWA in order to fund multiple projects. For projects in Middlesex County, it included the construction of a sewage plant in Sayreville and the elimination of two of the grade crossings in Woodbridge Township. The grade crossing at Oak Tree Road in Iselin would get $113,535 for its depression under the Pennsylvania Railroad main line while the Avenel Street crossing on the Perth Amboy and Woodbridge Branch would get $98,100 towards the now $218,000 project. Barbour, fellow Senator A. Harry Moore and Representative William H. Sutphin announced the municipalities the approval of their funding. Woodbridge officials, ecstatic that the Avenel and Oak Tree crossings were approved, stated that they would renew their efforts for funding on the remaining crossings.

With the federal money in hand, the board of Public Utility Commissioners stated in August that work of the Avenel Street and Oak Tree Road cossings would have to begin by October 1, 1936 and be finished within one calendar year of that date. The $218,000 project would involve construction of a new two track railroad bridge along with new retaining walls, abutments and stairs to facilitate the new alignment. New platforms would be built at Avenel station to help facilitate the construction. 275 feet (84 m) of Avenel Street would be realigned, resulting in the replacement of drainage and local sewers. New signals and telegraph lines would also be installed. The Leesville Avenue (in Avenel) and Colonia Boulevard (in Colonia) crossings had their funding approved in early September 1936. At that time, they announced that the Avenel Street crossing would get their proposals by October 1 to the Pennsylvania Railroad.

Despite the victory for the township, local residents were steaming about their demands for construction of an overpass rather than the underpass. Ernest E. Raymond, running for election in the Township's Third Ward as their committeeman as a Democrat, stated at a picnic in September that all local civic organization opposed the project as it stood and stated that the township had failed its constituents. One local committeeman, stated that he would work with the township to have Avenel Street crossing elevated instead of depressed. He felt that dead ending parts of Avenel Street would create a hardship for local residents and business owners. Changes were proposed in a petition submitted to Woodbridge Township officials by Steven Brown and a local citizen's fraternity. He demanded that the plan be tossed due to the idea that children would climb the underpass and injure themselves. Committeeman Ernest Nier was offered to join a meeting at the Avenel School to discuss the proposal. Mayor Augustus Greiner stated that the municipality had no power to change any part of the proposal and opposed the petition on that ground. The municipality took no official action on the petition.

The hearing with Nier occurred on September 19 at the Avenel School. S. Charles Brown hosted the hearing with approximately 100 locals in attendance. Brown continued to point out that local civic and fraternal organizations, along with other residents, opposed the construction. Jack Rhodes, the uncle of a child killed at the Avenel Street crossing, added his opposition to the project. Nier reiterated the position of Greiner, adding that the railroad would not go out of its way to accommodate the township. The township engineer showed the designs and where the township and its residents would benefit. A vote by the residents at the meeting showed 96 percent in favor of the elevation of the crossing instead of an underpass. They added that if the Township Committee did not work in their favor, they would go to the Chancery Court and demand an injunction to stop construction. At the township meeting on October 7, Nier proposed a resolution to have the Board of Public Utilities and the Pennsylvania Railroad add a pedestrian underpass under the tracks to help facilitate safe crossing of the southern sidewalk. The township approved the resolution and submitted it.

On October 31, the Board of Public Utility Commissioners gave the Pennsylvania Railroad an extension of the original October 1 start deadline for the Avenel Street, Leesville Avenue and Oak Tree Road crossings. The Pennsylvania Railroad stated that they did not have finances for the work and needed more money from the federal government.

The Board of Public Utility Commissioners ordered a new pedestrian underpass under the track on April 21, 1937. While the Pennsylvania Railroad opposed the $14,700 addition to the project, the Board agreed with local citizens on their complaints. The Board added time for construction to be finished on October 1, 1937. The railroad finished the project on November 1, 1937.

On December 6, 1938, a realty company in Perth Amboy filed a suit against the railroad in a federal court. The company stated that they lost $45,000 in damages for loss of rents at 85–95 Avenel Street during the construction.

=== Station upgrades and proposed closure (1979–1993) ===
As part of complaints toward the New Jersey Department of Transportation and Conrail in 1979, who now operated the line as the North Jersey Coast Line, upgrades were announced on April 10, 1979. As part of the upgrades, equipment would be repaired and operated via the Bay Head yard, and the stations at Long Branch, Woodbridge, Hazlet and Avenel would get upgrades. The proposed $300,000 in upgrades would improve the four stations including repairing the platforms, shelters, painting, lighting, plumbing and roofing. $10,000 was given to engineering work to determine what each of the four stations would need. After determining repairs, New Jersey Transit announced $106,000 would be given in design contracts for improvements to Avenel station in September 1980. Using funds from a 1979 transportation bond issue, this would include repaving the low-level asphalt platforms, repairing fire-damaged parts of the structure and the installation of new shelters to replace the old ones. NJ Transit announced a week later the official upgrades for Avenel station, which would cost $176,000. The spokeswoman for NJ Transit announced that the station at Avenel was in "deplorable shape, with the existing shacks falling apart. The expectation was that the project would be finished in mid-1981.

Despite the improvements, NJ Transit slashed most non-rush hour stops at Avenel station in October 1985. Three evening trains were eliminated heading towards the shore. However, due to mass complaints by passengers, one of the three eliminated trains was reinstated. Avenel station by May 1986 had parts of the platforms closed and NJ Transit officials stated that they were looking into the thought of it, but had not started that process. State Senator Laurence S. Weiss, along with Assemblymen George Otlowski and Alan Karcher, all of Middlesex County, announced that the organization was considering it. They also announced their unanimous opposition to such a closure. They stated that "135–150 commuters were using the station daily", while NJ Transit said about 120 were. Woodbridge officials noted that the station had seen an upgrade in ridership due to construction of a nearby housing development and the existence of Avenel station. Weiss, Karcher and Otlowski all stated that they wanted a meeting between them, NJ Transit, a local railroad commuter group and Woodbridge Mayor Philip Cerria and that NJ Transit should be make some basic repairs. NJ Transit added that any closure would require public hearings.

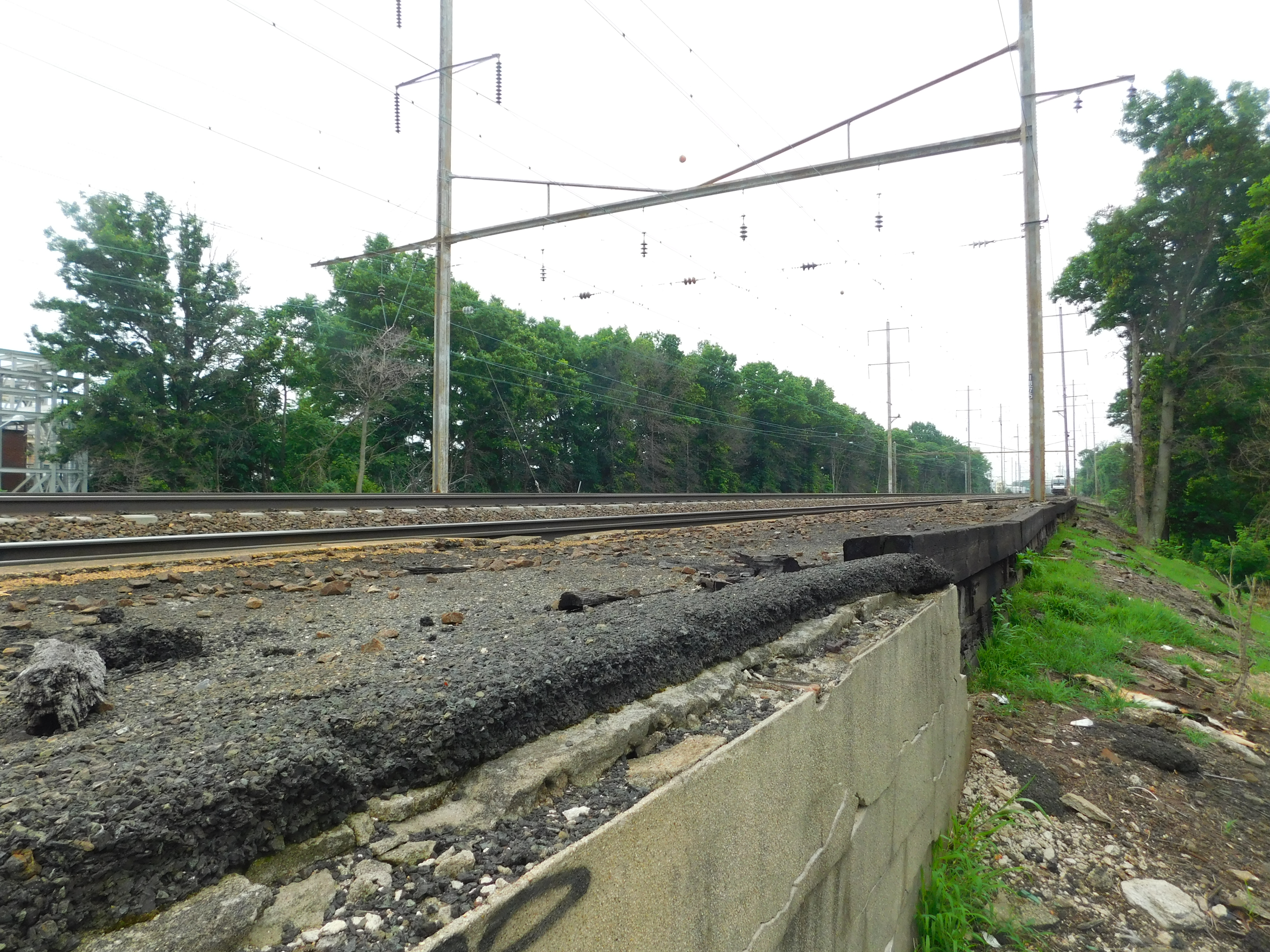
The former North Rahway station in June 2018, 25 years after the station was closed

NJ Transit began official discussions internally about closing Avenel station in February 1992 along with the stop at North Rahway on the Northeast Corridor Line. NJ Transit officials confirmed on September 3, 1992 that these discussions had taken place and that repairs needed for both stations combined would cost as much as $600,000. With facilities at both stations in a perpetual state of decline along with ridership, NJ Transit officials were unsure if they thought it was worth the use of money to repair both stations. Compared to the first proposal in 1986, Avenel daily ridership had fallen to under 75 riders a day by September 1992. The agency added that any decisions would also involve their proximity to other existing stations and that they would be open to operating buses between the two stops to other nearby stations. However, they stated that even officials had differing opinions on the future of both stops.

Woodbridge Mayor Jim McGreevey opposed the closing of Avenel station, stating that all the stations in Woodbridge would be unable to handle the increased ridership and that it would inconvenience riders. He chose to write a letter to NJ Transit to demand they keep Avenel station open. State Senator Randy Corman, who replaced Weiss, and Stephen A. Mikulak, who replaced Otlowski, joined McGreevey in their opposition to the closing of Avenel station. Corman and Mikulak also opposed closing North Rahway station. With traffic and parking issues at Metropark station on the Northeast Corridor Line, they felt closing the two stations would exacerbate the existing issues. Mikulak also questioned whether the agency had the money for a new parking deck at Metropark when it did not have money to repair the two endangered stops.

Angered residents in Woodbridge started a petition in late September 1992 to demand NJ Transit keep Avenel station open. 184 people who rode NJ Transit signed the petition by September 25. Complaints from riders argued that the walking to Rahway and Woodbridge stations from Avenel was prohibitive and if the station closed, the area would become a gather point for people who used drugs or alcohol. Others noted that some people pick up their kids from schools and nurseries after returning from work. Frank Pelzman of the Council noted that NJ Transit should hold a meeting before any final decision and felt that Avenel station had more ridership than NJ Transit claimed. Pelzman noted that the station would also gain more riders when a townhouse development on Park Avenue was finished.

NJ Transit announced on October 14 that they would hold a public meeting at Avenel School 4 and 5 on October 21 to discuss the possible closing of the stations. NJ Transit officials added that they were going to make a decision on whether to close the two stops in early October, but due to public outcry, they postponed their decision making for hearings and review to be held.

At the October 21 hearing, NJ Transit met with almost 200 residents of Avenel and local politicians. Corman, who attended the meeting, lambasted NJ Transit officials about why NJ Transit was spending over $2.3 million on the station at Elberon and $10 million to upgrade Rahway station, but would not spend money for Avenel. Corman noted that NJ Transit was getting $496 million in federal aid for various transportation projects and that some of that money can go for Avenel station, which was a pocket change improvement compared to other projects. NJ Transit stated that improvements for Avenel would cost $1.1 million, a number that could go down if NJ Transit removed the proposed elevator for handicap access. Residents also questioned the ridership statistics the agency quoted, adding that if NJ Transit had put in routine maintenance, they would have more riders. One added that the station has vomit, broken glass and various odors on a daily basis. Some existing customers at Avenel stated that they had only railroad transportation to get to work between handicaps and/or a lack of automobiles. McGreevey stated that Avenel station should remain open for the sake of property values, economic prosperity and quality of life and that the agency should be promoting mass transit usage than reducing it. NJ Transit's official at the meeting stated that they were planning to give Avenel more bus routes and that more parking was available at the Rahway and downtown Woodbridge stops. His responses were met with heckling from those in the audience.

NJ Transit announced on December 17 that they would close the North Rahway station on January 30, 1993, despite local pressure to stop the closure.

In January 1993, Mikulak and fellow Assemblyman Ernest L. Oros pushed the New Jersey Office of Economic Recovery to stop the closure of Avenel station. They stated that it was important to show that NJ Transit could facilitate improvement to jobs that serve local industries and keep jobs in New Jersey. Avenel was home to General Dynamics, which employed over 300 people during that time period and they have wanted to ensure that the firm stayed despite multiple threats of closing various plants. NJ Transit noted that they held a hearing in December 1992 to look at using ramps instead of elevators and how safe the station was structurally as part of their decision making.

Oros announced on June 22, 1993 that a provision in the ballot in front of Governor Jim Florio included enough money to keep Avenel station open provided it was not eliminated in a line item veto. NJ Transit stated that they were not confirming Oros' statement and that it was pure speculation on the Assemblyman's part. The entry in the budget allocated $310,000 for Avenel station to remain open through 1994.

NJ Transit announced on October 23, 1993 that it would retain service at Avenel station on a permanent basis and begin designing a reconstruction of the station to improve the rider experience. As part of the announcement, Woodbridge officials would agree to make new parking for Avenel commuters and that on-street parking would be improved for local residents. The cost for the station renovations would cost around $1.1 million. McGreevey added that they struck a deal with a local tavern to rent their parking lot for commuters to use. The municipality would repave and repaint the lot, adding 28–35 spots for riders. They also added signage to point towards Avenel station. Woodbridge Economic Development Corporation would also begin promotional efforts to attract ridership and attention to the station. NJ Transit added that the new station would construction new platforms, signs, lighting, repair the stairs and make the station compliant with the Americans with Disabilities Act (ADA). There was also room for consideration of elevators on a future basis. NJ Transit's officials noted that the agency goal was to push ridership back towards 125–130 daily riders.

=== Reconstruction (1994–1998) ===
NJ Transit noted that progress on a new station at Avenel was on normal pace by March 1994. Three designs from the architectural firm of Stone and Webster were being given to NJ Transit and they would choose the design they liked the best. They would then bring the design and their reasoning to Woodbridge Township officials and get their approval. Oros stated that NJ Transit hold a briefing in April and that he would monitor progress to ensure the agency stayed to their word. The expectation was that construction would begin in the Spring of 1995. NJ Transit officially announced their selection of a design in June 1994, with an estimated cost of $1.3–$1.8 million for the new station. A new shelter would be built on the inbound platform, but no station shelter would be installed on the outbound one. Four parking spaces for handicapped riders would be added, with two at the end of the platforms. Ramps and an elevator would be installed at Avenel station for ADA compliance. They added that funds would come from the 1995 fiscal year construction, which would now begin in the fall of 1994 and be finished in the summer of 1995 instead of the spring start.

During an announcement for improvements of Woodbridge and Metropark station in September 1994, NJ Transit announced that the preliminary design work was finished and that the construction and design would cost the agency $2.1 million total. Construction was pushed back to the second half of 1995 and be completed in 1997.

Despite NJ Transit putting out bids for design and engineering in January 1996, ground was not broken for the new project until June 11, 1998. With money coming from the Transportation Trust Fund, the new Avenel station would officially have the new platforms, both of which would have shelters, new stairs, park and new ramps for handicap access. McGreevey operated a backhoe at the ceremony to signify his part of the project. He added that they were looking for a location for a proper parking deck or parking lot to facilitate better ridership at Avenel station. At the event, one rider showed concern that while officials were confident in boosted ridership, the lack of non-rush hour trains would affect it and that NJ Transit should consider reinstating better service to help the new station. NJ Transit officials stated that the project would take six to nine months to complete.

NJ Transit and Woodbridge officials opened the new station on December 22, 1998. NJ Transit responded to the complaints about the lack of service, stating that they did not want to add more trains from the current 16 until the ridership improves. However, they said that they would consider in Spring 1999 adding more stops at Avenel for trains on the North Jersey Coast Line.

=== Development and service restoration (2000–2019) ===
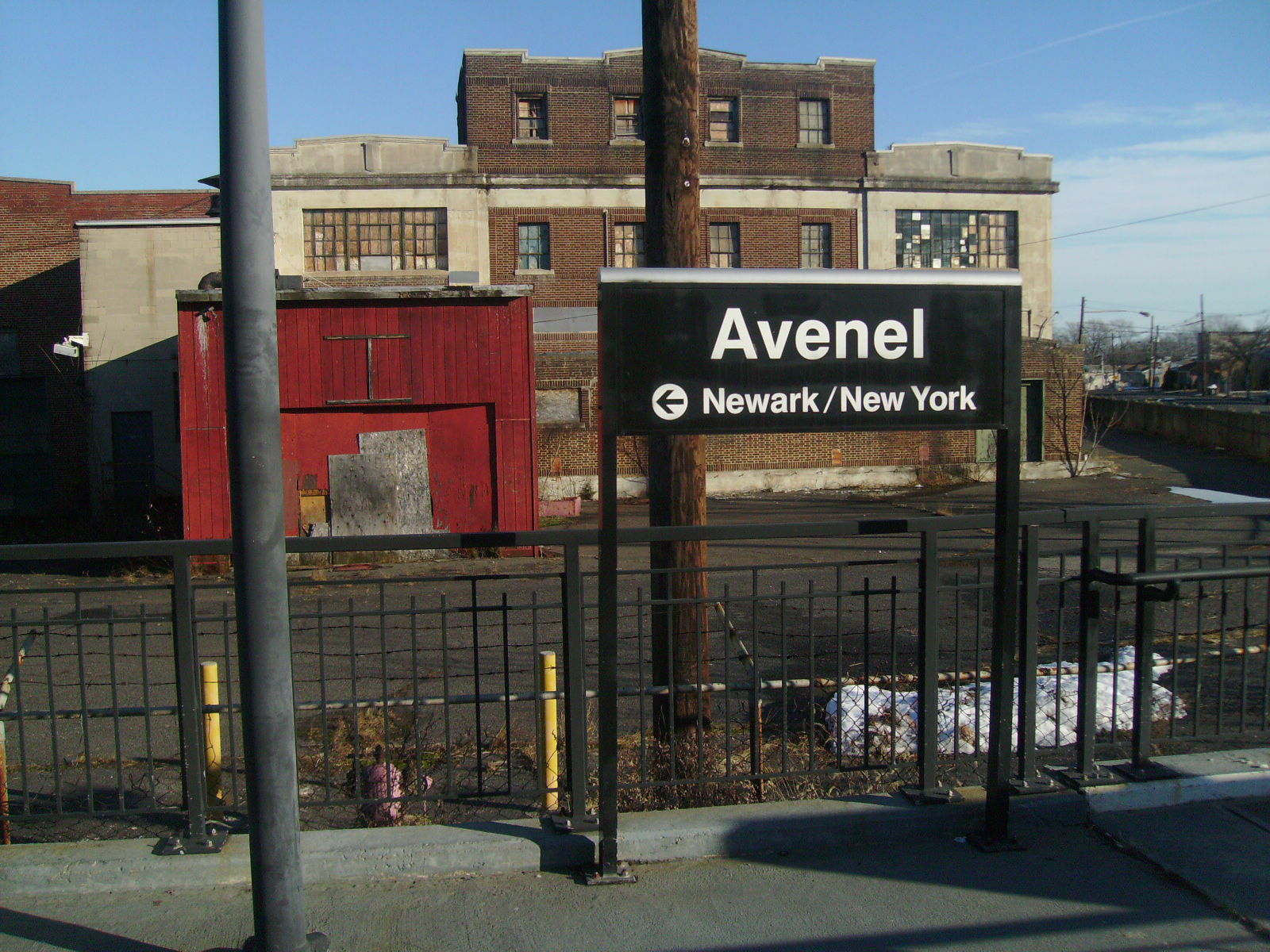
The former General Dynamics plant behind an Avenel station sign in December 2009

On May 4, 2000, General Dynamics announced the closure of the Electro Dynamic plant at Avenel, which employed 111 people. The work would be moved to the factory in Groton, Connecticut.

In 2004, when the plant closed for good, the location was considered a heavily polluted site sued by the New Jersey Attorney General office along with nine other locations in the state. The township began development of plans to replace the 27 acres (11 ha) site, citing that it would be a new source of economic revenue for Avenel and Rahway. However, Woodbridge Mayor John McCormac stated remediation would be required first at a cost of $6 million. McCormac stated that they were not interested in building a transit village on the site, stating that they wanted to reduce car use in the area. Woodbridge officials liked the idea of an arts design with studio units and loft units that would involve people taking trains at Avenel station. McCormac added that while some locals wanted a park on the location, the costs of remediation would not justify the investment into a park.

Remediation of the polluted area began in January 2008, removing Lead, arsenic and other chemicals from dirt at a nearby park.

In February 2009, Woodbridge Township approved a plan to turn the property into the Avenel Arts Village. McCormac stated that the design of the development would bring artists and be located next to Avenel station, facilitating commutes to New York City, if an artist could not afford rents in the city.

In October 2014, the township made an agreement with a limited liability company, 150 Avenel, to work on the remediation for the property and construct the new arts village. Victoria Classics, who took over the property in 2003, got a 30-year tax break to make the project financially viable and remove the $8 million remediation burden on local taxpayers. The new project would involve constructing 25,000 square feet (2,300 m^{2}) of retail, 10,000 square feet (930 m^{2}) arts center, 50,000 square feet (4,600 m^{2}) of open space and 500 apartments. The new construction would bring 150 jobs on a temporary basis, along with 24 permanent ones.

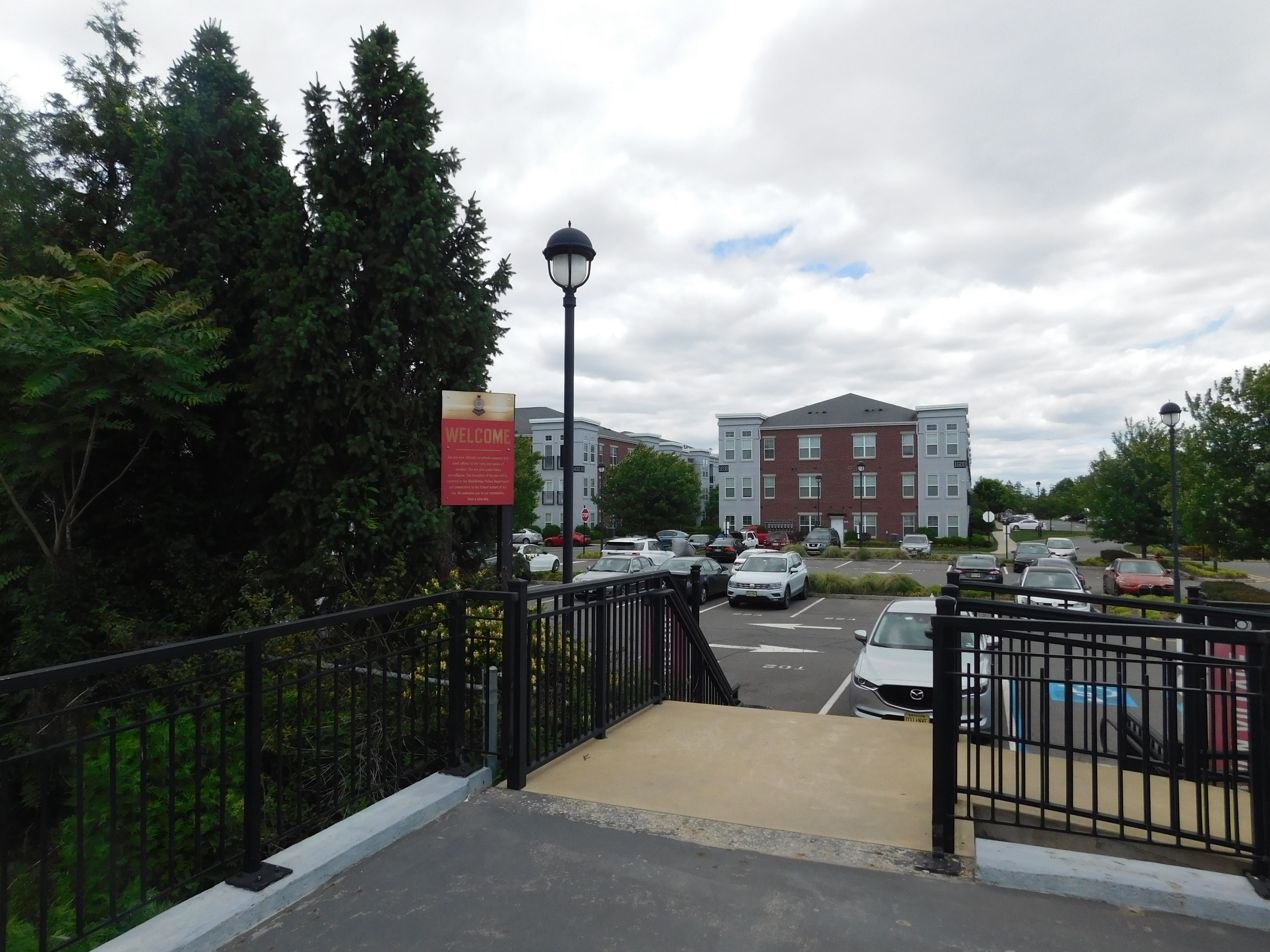
The new Station Village at Avenel in May 2026

Demolition began on the General Dynamics plant in March 2015 to build the new Avenel Arts Village and Station Loft at Avenel. Atlantic Realty Development Corporation, which was in charge of the demolition and development, stated that the remediation and demolition would take six to eight months to complete. At that point, speculation was that the new development would be built in phases with the first buildings beginning construction in the spring of 2016 and an opening in early 2017. The Middlesex County Cultural and Arts Trust Fund gave Woodbridge Township $6 million in October 2015 to continue further work on the site.

McCormac and other local officials and executives held a ribbon cutting ceremony at Avenel station for the new complex on October 17, 2017. As part of development, Avenel station had some renovation work done. With the new development, NJ Transit officials stated that they would look at the possibility of adding more trains to Avenel station if ridership warranted and as development continued at the new complex.

With upgraded ridership, NJ Transit announced that service at Avenel station would expand from 27 stops on weekdays to 38 stops, mostly in non-rush hour services starting on September 8, 2019. The station would also have full weekend service for the first time since April 1985. As part of the decision making, Woodbridge Township improved the parking near Avenel station to help spur ridership. NJ Transit added further trains on November 8, 2020, with two morning weekday trains and three afternoon trains added to the stops.

== Station layout and services ==
Avenel station contains two three-car long high-level side platforms that cross Avenel Street. A ticket vending machine is on the shelter on the East Side Lane side of the station in the shelter. The station contains a passenger tunnel between the two platforms that crosses under the tracks. Avenel station has only 33 parking spaces between the two sides of Old Avenel Street. Woodbridge Township maintains the parking, which is free. An extra access point of stairs are present to access Station Village, the residential/commercial complex.

Avenel station is the only station in fare zone 9 along NJ Transit's North Jersey Coast Line, which operates electric service between New York Penn Station and Long Branch. Diesel connections are available at Long Branch with service to Bay Head station.

== Bibliography ==
- Carleton, George Washington (1865). The Railroad and Insurance Almanac for 1865. New York, New York: Carleton, Publisher.
- Troeger, Virginia B.; McEwen, Robert James (2002). Woodbridge: New Jersey's Oldest Township. Mount Pleasant, South Carolina: Arcadia Publishing. ISBN 9780738523941.
