= Manasquan station =

NJ Transit rail station

Manasquan
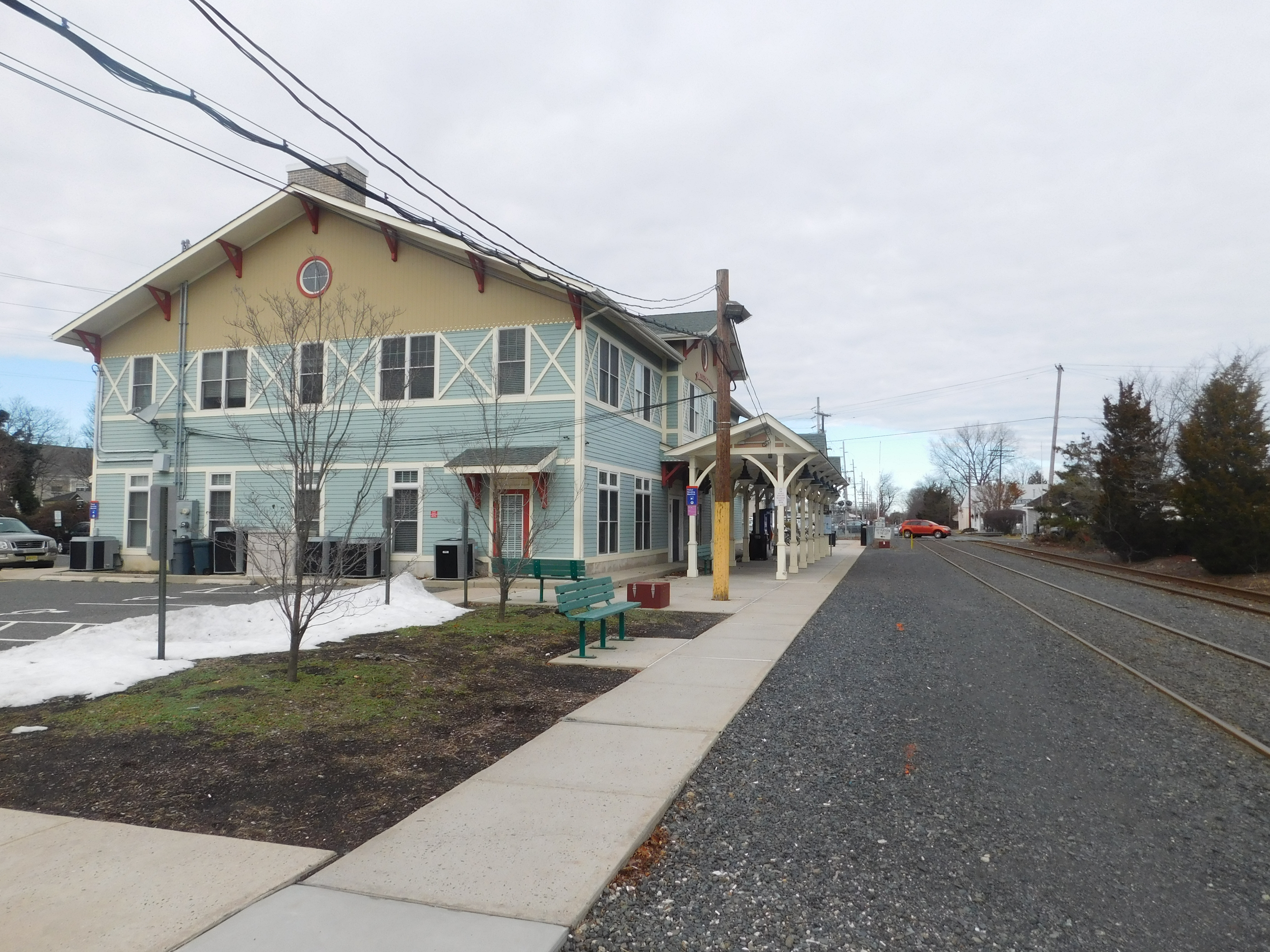
- Manasquan station in January 2018. The station depot, a replacement for the one burned in 1996, is on the left.

General information
- Location: 229 East Main Street; Manasquan, New Jersey 08736
- Coordinates: 40°07′15″N 74°02′51″W
- Owner: NJ Transit
- Platforms: 1 side platform
- Tracks: 2
- Connections: NJT Bus: 317 and 830

Construction
- Parking: 145 spaces (140 standard, 5 accessible)
- Cycle facilities: Yes
- Accessible: No

Other information
- Fare zone: 23

History
- Opened: July 29, 1880
- Rebuilt: 1896, 2004 (depot rebuilt)

Key dates
- March 30, 1996: Depot caught fire

Passengers
- 2025: 115 (average weekday)
- Rank: 116 of 153

Services
| Preceding station | NJ Transit | Following station |
|---|---|---|
| Point Pleasant Beach toward Bay Head | North Jersey Coast Line | Spring Lake toward New York |
Former services
| Preceding station | New York and Long Branch Railroad | Following station |
|---|---|---|
| Brielle toward Bay Head Junction | Main Line | Sea Girt toward Perth Amboy |
Location

Manasquan station is an active commuter railroad station in the eponymous borough of Manasquan, Monmouth County, New Jersey. Located just south of East Main Street, the station serves trains of NJ Transit's North Jersey Coast Line between Bay Head and New York Penn Station. The station is located on the diesel section of the line south of Long Branch. Manasquan station consists of a gravel side platform with two tracks and a replica station depot. The station has 145 parking spaces divided up in three lots.

== History ==
The station originally opened in 1876 by the Central Railroad of New Jersey. In 1896, the depot was replaced by the one at Spring Lake. The depot was built out of wood from Philadelphia's agricultural exhibition in the celebration of the United States Centennial in 1876. The depot lasted on the site until March 30, 1996, when a fire ravaged the 120-year-old building while serving as the home of the local historical society. The fire-ravaged depot came down in May. A replacement depot, the one currently on the site, began construction in 2004.

== Station layout ==
This station is not handicapped accessible. It consists of two tracks, one for each respective direction; the track corresponding to New York Penn Station-bound trains does not have a concrete platform and is reached by crossing the track corresponding to Bay Head-bound trains.

== Bibliography ==
- Shea, Raymond F. (2009). Brielle: From Saltworks to Suburb. Mount Pleasant, South Carolina: Arcadia Publishing. ISBN 9781614235255.
