= Spring Lake station =

NJ Transit rail station

Spring Lake
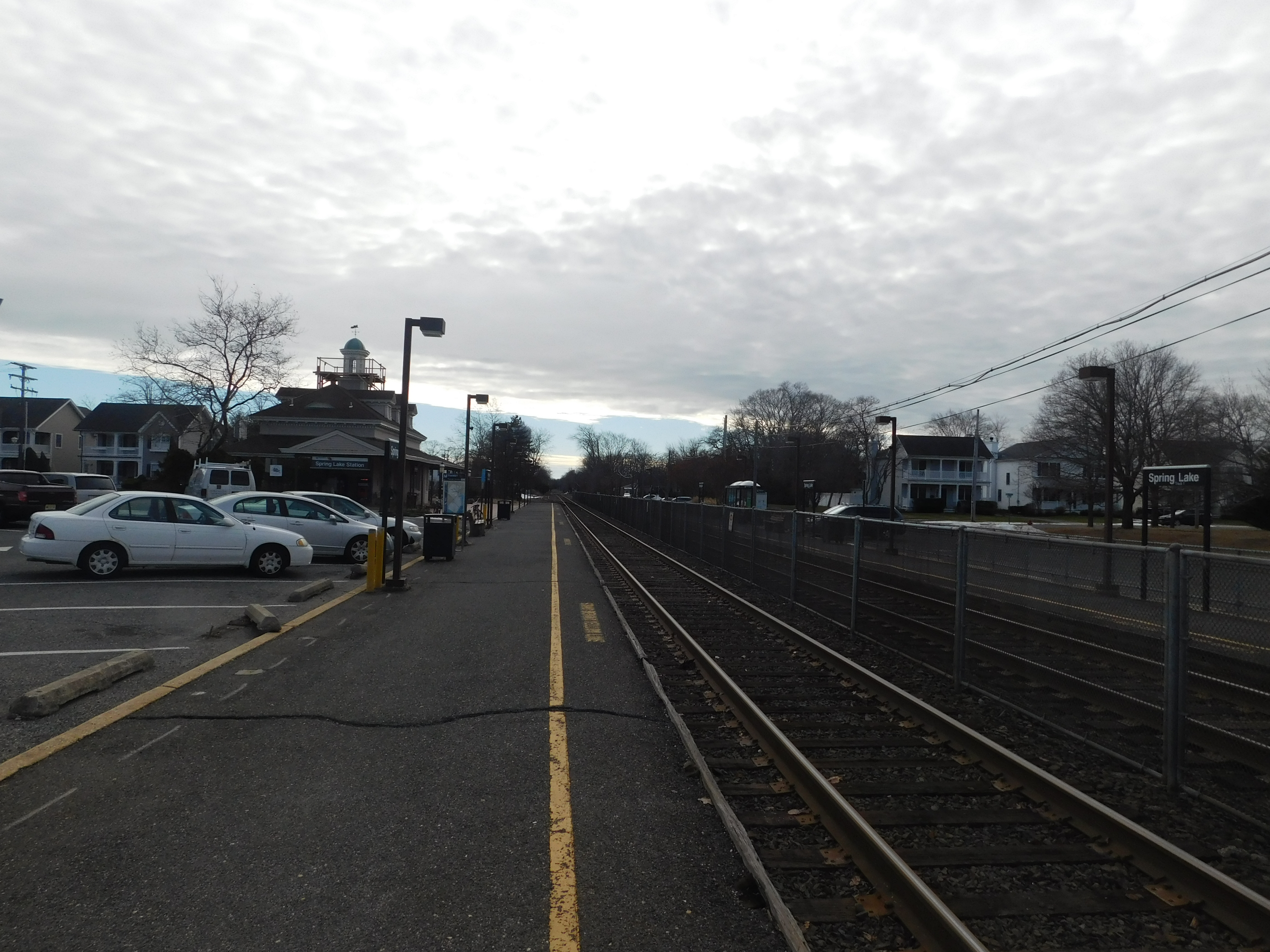
- The station depot at Spring Lake hovers over the platform in January 2018.

General information
- Location: Railroad and Warren Avenues; Spring Lake, New Jersey 07762
- Coordinates: 40°09′04″N 74°02′09″W
- Owner: NJ Transit
- Platforms: 2 side platforms
- Tracks: 2
- Connections: NJ Transit Bus: 317 and 830

Construction
- Parking: 188 spaces (185 standard, 3 accessible)
- Cycle facilities: Yes
- Accessible: No

Other information
- Fare zone: 22

History
- Opened: October 11, 1875
- Rebuilt: 1898

Passengers
- 2025: 119 (average weekday)
- Rank: 114 of 153

Services
Preceding station	NJ Transit	Following station
Manasquan toward Bay Head	North Jersey Coast Line	Belmar toward New York
Former services
Preceding station	New York and Long Branch Railroad	Following station
Sea Girt toward Bay Head Junction	Main Line	Como toward Perth Amboy
Location

Spring Lake is a commuter railroad station in the borough of Spring Lake, Monmouth County, New Jersey, United States. Located near the border with Spring Lake Heights, trains are served by New Jersey Transit's North Jersey Coast Line, which serve stations from New York Penn Station, Hoboken Terminal and Long Branch to Bay Head. The next station northward is Belmar, while the next station south is Manasquan. Spring Lake station lacks accessibility for handicapped persons per the Americans With Disabilities Act of 1990.

== History ==
Service through Spring Lake began on October 11, 1875, when the New York and Long Branch Railroad was extended south from Ocean Beach station (now Belmar) to Sea Girt. Spring Lake station was built on property of William V. Reid, a local landowner.

The Borough Council in Spring Lake worked to lease out the station depot in late 1972 and early 1973. They opened an offer for bids in early 1973, with bids due on January 8. The borough wanted to offer a 25-year lease for $10,000 per year with increases, on the condition the depot was remodeled at a cost of at least $100,000. Any lease would be official as of April 1, 1973. At the Council meeting, it was announced that only a single bid on the station depot was offered, one from J. P. Business Broker Transit of Sea Girt. The Council rejected the bid on account that it had no monetary figures or remodeling plans attached. At that time, the Council indefinitely suspended work on leasing out the station depot. A new attempt was made on June 12, 1973 by the Borough Council. They introduced an ordinance to receive bids at the same amounts as the attempt in January.

The Borough Council approved a new lease on July 9 with the First National State Bank, a firm from Spring Lake. The chairman of the bank board noted that railroad services would be offered by the bank, with a waiting room available for commuters. The station depot would be restored to its Victorian-era architecture and use most of the depot as a bank branch. The first floor would have the waiting room, a ticket office and a spot for banking operations and a department chair office. A second story would be added to the depot to offer a meeting room for public use. The bank would also pay property taxes on the building. Spring Lake station would be called the Station Plaza Office. Walter Pfeiffer, an architect specializing in Victorian-era architecture, designed the renovation work.

Restoration and renovation work on the Spring Lake station on January 3, 1974. Woodward Construction Company, the general contractor, and several municipal officials held a groundbreaking ceremony that day by removing a door. At that time, the bank also became the National State Bank of the Jersey Coast after merging with another bank. The renovated station depot opened as a new bank office on July 20, 1974. The new teller counters and chairs were taken from a bank in Newark; new weathervane on top of the depot was made to look like the Wabash Cannon Ball locomotive and its coal tender. Railroad posters and travel posters from the 1890s were added to the walls, along with a similar era chandelier.

== Station layout ==
The station has two low-level asphalt side platforms.

== Bibliography ==
- Wainwright, Halsted H. (1922). History of Monmouth County, New Jersey, 1664-1920 Volume 2. New York, New York: The Lewis Historical Publishing Company.
