= Long Branch =

Long Branch may refer to:

== Places ==
=== Bodies of water ===
- Long Branch (Toms Dam Branch tributary), a stream in Sussex County, Delaware
- Long Branch (Chestatee River), a tributary to the Chestatee River in the US state of Georgia
- Long Branch, a tributary of Sligo Creek in Maryland
- Long Branch (Elkhorn Creek), a stream in Missouri
- Long Branch (Platte River tributary), a stream in Missouri
- Long Branch (Salt River), a stream in Missouri
- Long Branch (Troublesome Creek), a stream in Missouri
- Long Branch (Trent River tributary), a stream in Jones County, North Carolina
- Long Branch (Reedy Fork tributary), a stream in Guilford County, North Carolina
- Long Branch (Elkin Creek tributary), a stream in Wilkes County, North Carolina
- Long Branch (Lawsons Creek tributary), a stream in Halifax County, Virginia
- Long Branch (Little Nottoway River tributary), a stream in Nottoway County, Virginia
- Long Branch (Whitethorn Creek tributary), a stream in Pittsylvania County, Virginia

=== Communities ===
- Long Branch, Illinois, United States
- Long Branch, New Jersey, United States
- Long Branch, Pennsylvania, United States
- Long Branch, Eastland County, Texas, United States
- Long Branch, Panola County, Texas, United States
- Long Branch, Toronto, Ontario, Canada
- Long Branch, Caroline County, Virginia, United States
- Long Branch, Fairfax County, Virginia, United States
- Long Branch, Fayette County, West Virginia, United States
- Long Branch, Wyoming County, West Virginia, United States

=== Parks ===
- Long Branch Park in Onondaga County, New York, United States

== Transportation ==
- Long Branch GO Station, a station on the Lakeshore West line in Toronto, Canada
- 507 Long Branch, a former streetcar route on the Toronto streetcar system
- HMCS Long Branch (K487), a Canadian Flower class corvette

== Other uses ==
- Long Branch (Millwood, Virginia), United States, an historic house
- Long branch (phylogenetics), a concept in phylogenetics
- Long Branch Saloon, a famous saloon that existed during the Old West days of Dodge City, Kansas
- Long Branch Records, a sub label of the German record label SPV

== See also ==
- Long Branch station (disambiguation)
- Branch (disambiguation)
- Long Beach Branch
