= Belmar station =

NJ Transit rail station

Belmar
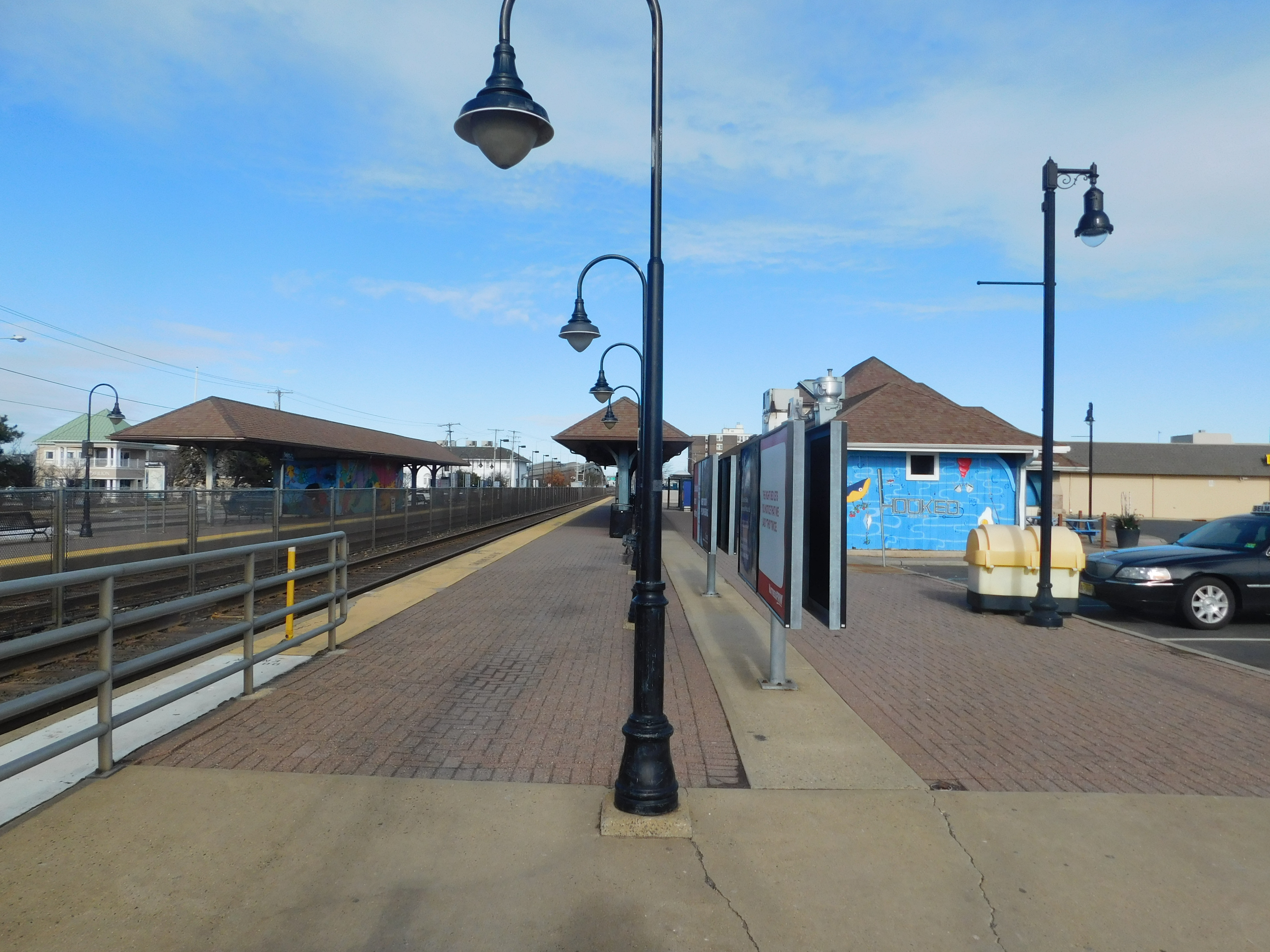
- Belmar station facing towards the Shark River Drawbridge in Belmar in January 2018.

General information
- Location: Belmar Plaza, between 8th and 10th Avenues; Belmar, New Jersey 07719
- Coordinates: 40°10′49″N 74°01′39″W
- Owner: NJ Transit
- Platforms: 2 side platforms
- Tracks: 2
- Connections: NJ Transit Bus: 317, 830

Construction
- Parking: 188 spaces (185 standard, 3 accessible)
- Cycle facilities: Yes
- Accessible: No

Other information
- Fare zone: 22

History
- Opened: September 14, 1875
- Former names: Ocean Beach (September 14, 1875–1889)

Passengers
- 2025: 153 (average weekday)
- Rank: 105 of 153

Services
Preceding station	NJ Transit	Following station
Spring Lake toward Bay Head	North Jersey Coast Line	Bradley Beach toward New York
Former services
Preceding station	New York and Long Branch Railroad	Following station
Como toward Bay Head Junction	Main Line	Avon toward Perth Amboy
Location

Belmar station is an active commuter railroad station in the eponymous borough of Belmar, Monmouth County, New Jersey. Located in Belmar Plaza between 8th and 10th Avenues, the station serves trains of NJ Transit's North Jersey Coast Line, which operates out of New York Penn Station. Belmar station operates in the diesel-only section between Bay Head in Ocean County and Long Branch. The station consists of two low-level side platforms with three parking lots along 10th Avenue available for commuters. The former station built by the Central Railroad of New Jersey stands on the inbound platform.

== History ==
Belmar station opened as part of an extension from Asbury Park–Ocean Grove station of the New York and Long Branch Railroad on September 14, 1875, as Ocean Beach. The name of the station was changed to Belmar when the municipality changed its name from Ocean Beach to Elcho to Belmar in a month's span in 1889.

== Station layout ==
The station has two low-level brick cobblestone side platforms.
