= Woodbridge station (NJ Transit) =

NJ Transit rail station

Woodbridge
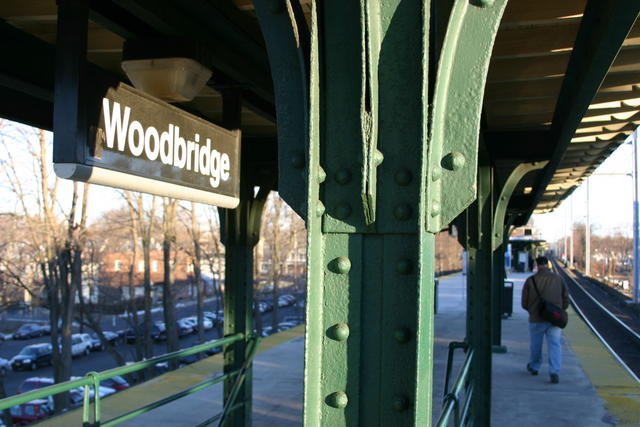
- Woodbridge station platform in June 2006, before the 2005–07 reconstruction.

General information
- Other names: "Home of Berkeley College"
- Location: Pearl Street between Main and Green streets Woodbridge Township, New Jersey 07095
- Coordinates: 40°33′25.54″N 74°16′40.02″W
- Owner: New Jersey Transit
- Platforms: 1 island platform
- Tracks: 2
- Connections: NJT Bus: 48, 116, and 803

Construction
- Parking: Yes
- Cycle facilities: Yes
- Accessible: Yes

History
- Opened: October 11, 1864
- Rebuilt: 1873; April 1885–August 1885; September 8, 1938–February 16, 1940; September 2005–Spring 2007
- Electrified: 12 kV 25 Hz

Passengers
- 2025: 1075 (average weekday)
- Rank: 31 of 153

Services
Preceding station	NJ Transit	Following station
Perth Amboy toward Bay Head	North Jersey Coast Line	Avenel toward New York
Former services
Preceding station	Pennsylvania Railroad	Following station
Genasco toward Perth Amboy	Perth Amboy and Woodbridge Branch	Edgar toward Rahway
Location

Woodbridge is a commuter railroad station in Woodbridge Township, Middlesex County, New Jersey, United States. Located on NJ Transit's North Jersey Coast Line, it is one of three active railroad stations in the eponymous township, including Avenel to the north on the same line and Metropark station on the Northeast Corridor Line. Woodbridge station is located on Pearl Street at the intersection with Brook Street, where stairs to the single island platform that serves trains are located.

Railroad service through downtown Woodbridge began on October 11, 1864, with the opening of the Perth Amboy and Woodbridge Railroad, a branch of the New Jersey Railroad, which would become the Pennsylvania Railroad. The first station depot was built in 1873 and was built at a level where the train cars would meet the platform at level. Discussions began in March 1882 to replace the depot. Following approval from Pennsylvania Railroad officials, construction on the new depot began in April 1885 and finished in August 1885. The idea of elevating the tracks to eliminate grade crossings in Woodbridge began in 1934 after the death of a local resident at the Green Street crossing on January 27. After attaining funds from the Public Works Administration, construction on the new elevated tracks began on September 8, 1938, with the first train operating over the current alignment on February 16, 1940. NJ Transit did their own reconstruction project, starting in September 2005, and being completed in mid-2007.

== History ==
The concept of a railroad through downtown Woodbridge came from a bill introduced by New Jersey State Senator Ralph C. Stults of Middlesex County introduced a bill to create the Perth Amboy and Woodbridge Railroad. A few previous attempts to extend the New Jersey Railroad from Rahway to Perth Amboy had failed. The Senate passed an incorporation charter on March 9, 1855. Construction began on the Perth Amboy and Woodbridge Railroad on July 1, 1858. At their annual meeting on June 4, 1859, the New Jersey Railroad agreed to operate a service between Perth Amboy and Woodbridge when it would be opened. The Perth Amboy and Woodbridge Railroad would be officially organized on June 9, 1860. The New Jersey Railroad declared themselves the stock subscriber on December 20, 1862. At that point they had 885 shares and on November 23, 1863, they approved 615 more, totaling 1,500. These bonds would be guaranteed by the railroad on December 28. Construction of the railroad began between Rahway and Perth Amboy, opening on October 11, 1864. The railroad service included an enclosed streetcar and one trailer, operated by the New Jersey Railroad.

The railroad built a station in 1873, similar to the current high-level platform where the station platform was above track level to meet cars for ease of boarding. The Pennsylvania Railroad began through service through Woodbridge along the New York and Long Branch Railroad on April 1, 1882, resulting in trains going through to Seaside Park. Demands for a new station to be built by the Pennsylvania Railroad came in 1882. Local citizens held a meeting at the Woodbridge Masonic Hall on March 6 to inquire about a new depot. The railroad sent back a message that they were going to consider it. Pennsylvania Railroad officials sent an inspection train in April 1882 to look at the situation and Woodbridge. After the inspection, they decided to go ahead with the construction of a new depot based on local demands. Woodbridge residents, in return, offered additional land for a new depot and new approaches from Green Street and Pearl Street. However, construction of the new station began in April 1885. The new station, built of brick, opened in August 1885.

== Station layout ==
Woodbridge has one high-level island platform serving trains in both directions.

== Gallery ==
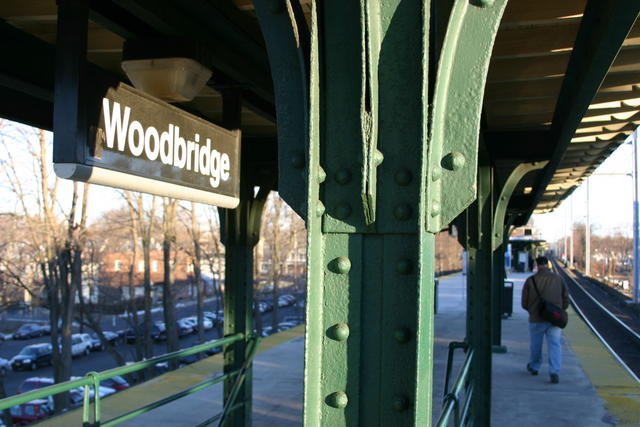
Old Woodbridge train platform

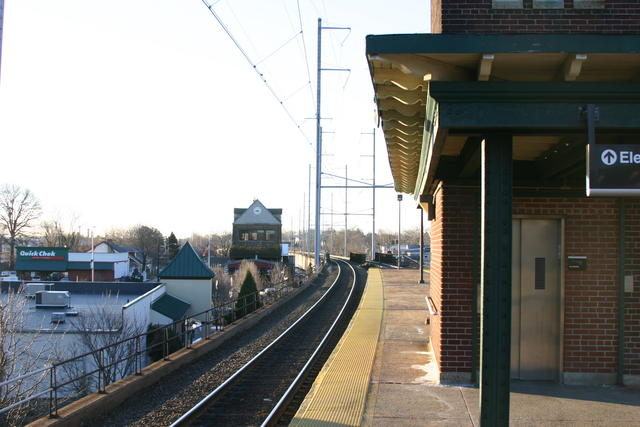
Looking south on the old platform

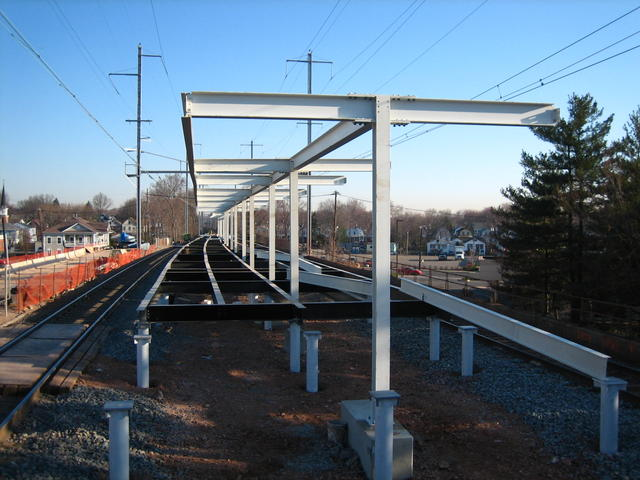
Building the new platform

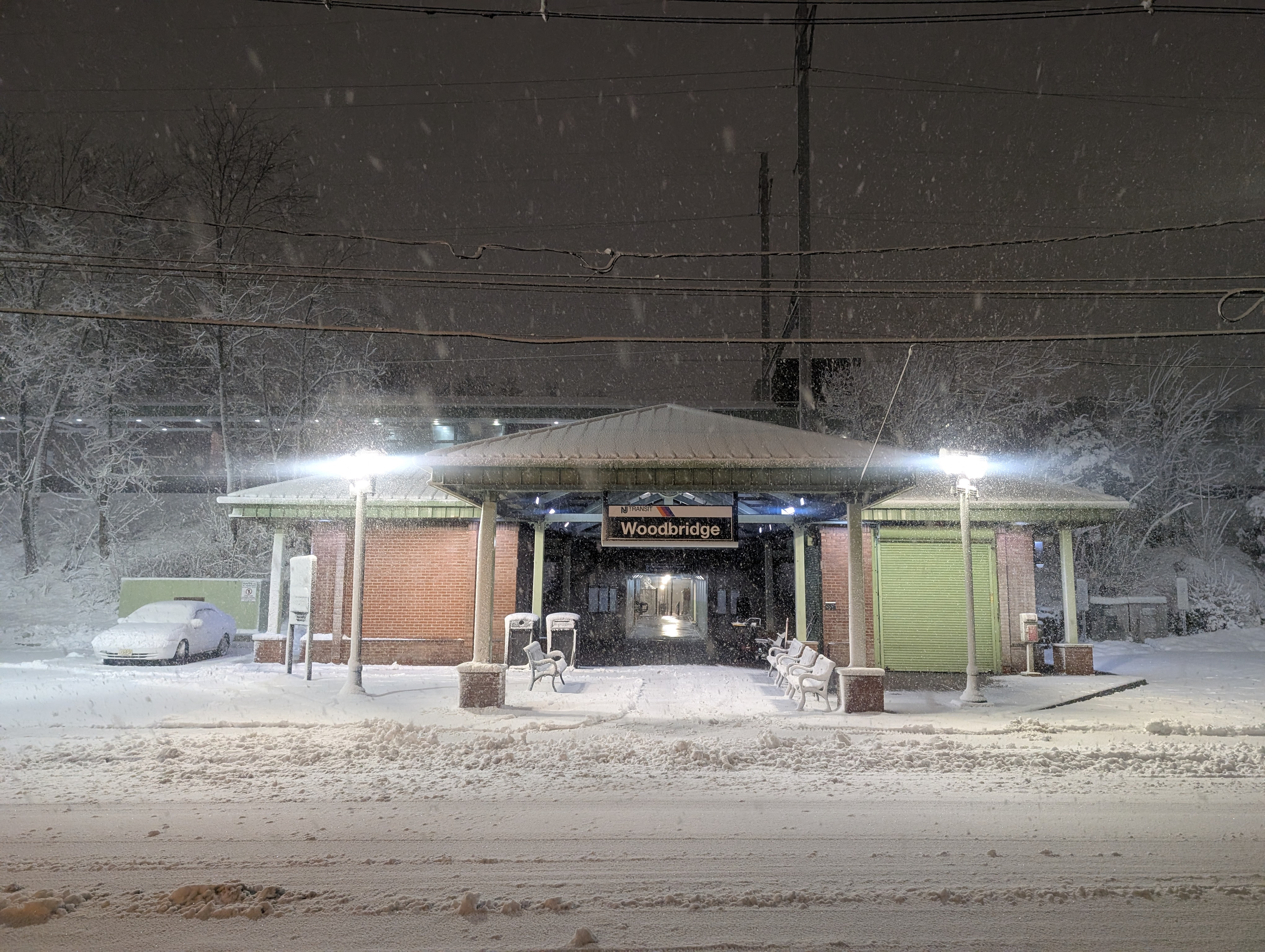
South entrance of Woodbridge station

== See also ==
- Woodbridge train wreck

== Bibliography ==
- Poor, Henry Varnum (1893). Poor's Manual of Railroads, Volume 26. New York, New York: American Bank Note Company.
- Woodbridge High School (1955). History of Woodbridge Township. Township of Woodbridge.
