= Point Pleasant Beach station =

NJ Transit rail station

Pt. Pleasant Beach
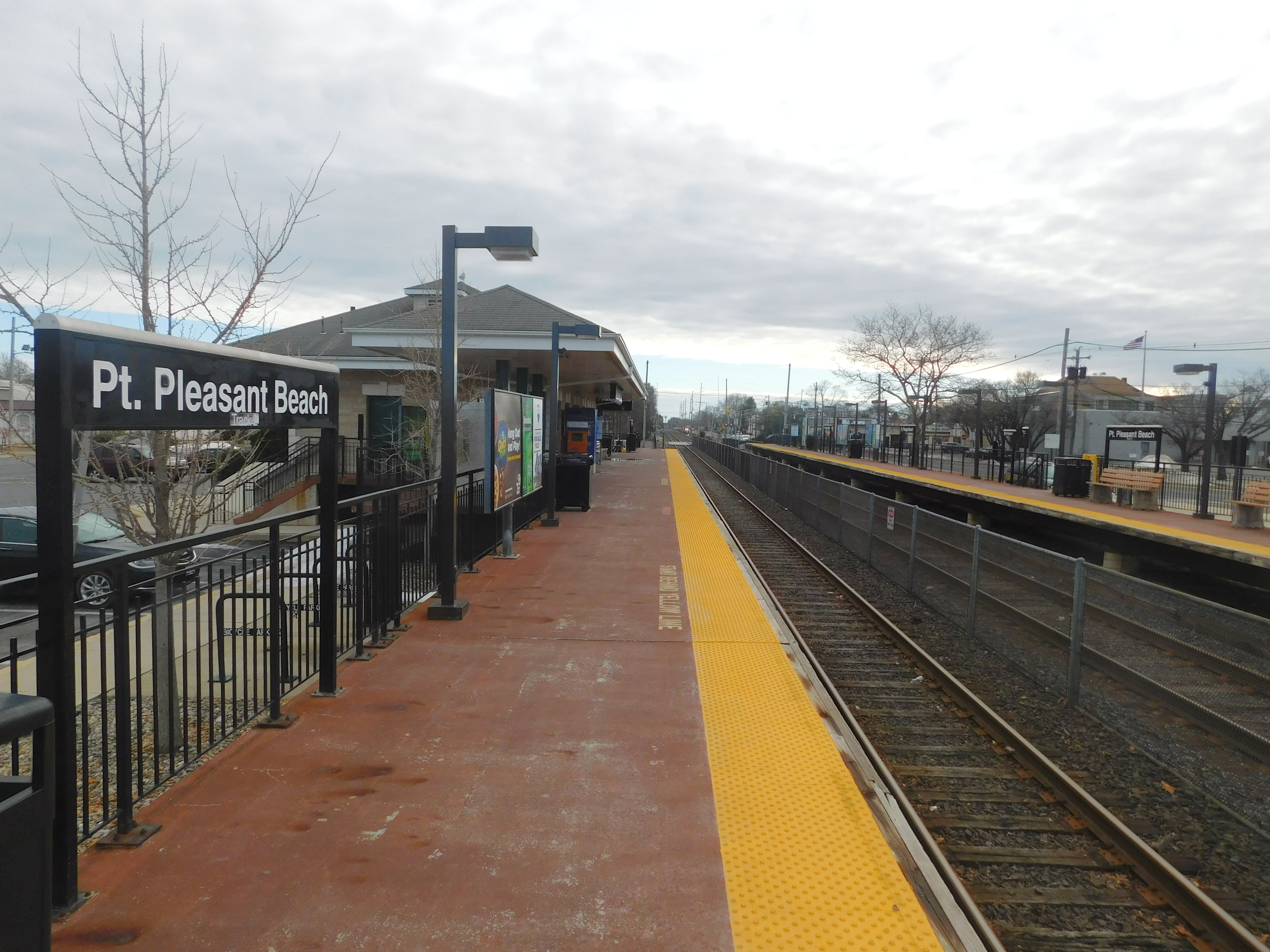
- Point Pleasant Beach station facing south on the northbound platform in January 2018.

General information
- Location: Arnold Avenue and Route 35 northbound Point Pleasant Beach, New Jersey 08742
- Coordinates: 40°05′34″N 74°02′55″W
- Owner: NJ Transit
- Platforms: 2 side platforms
- Tracks: 2
- Connections: NJT Bus: 317 and 830

Construction
- Parking: 197 spaces (190 standard, 7 accessible)
- Cycle facilities: Yes
- Accessible: Yes

Other information
- Fare zone: 23

History
- Opened: July 29, 1880
- Rebuilt: 1987; June 1994–January 1996
- Former names: Point Pleasant (July 29, 1880–April 28, 1957)

Key dates
- June 8, 1987: Station depot razed

Passengers
- 2025: 179 (average weekday)
- Rank: 103 of 153

Services
| Preceding station | NJ Transit | Following station |
|---|---|---|
| Bay Head Terminus | North Jersey Coast Line | Manasquan toward New York |
Former services
| Preceding station | New York and Long Branch Railroad | Following station |
|---|---|---|
| Bay Head Junction Terminus | Main Line | Brielle toward Perth Amboy |
Location

Point Pleasant Beach station is an active commuter railroad station in the borough of Point Pleasant Beach, Ocean County, New Jersey. Located at the junction of State Route 35 northbound and Arnold Avenue, the station serves trains of NJ Transit's North Jersey Coast Line between New York Penn Station and Bay Head station, the next station south. Point Pleasant Beach consists of two high-level side platforms and a 197-space parking lot, operated by the borough on a daily and permit basis. The inbound platform has a station depot with a ticket office.

== History ==
Service at Point Pleasant Beach began on July 29, 1880 as part of the New York and Long Branch Railroad extension from Sea Girt station. It retained the name Point Pleasant until April 28, 1957, when the word Beach was added to the name. The former station depot constructed by the Central Railroad of New Jersey was razed after being condemned due to the station settling to the ground. The 50-year-old structure was demolished on June 8, 1987, and replaced by a trailer. After several delays, construction of the new station began in June 1994, opening in January 1996.

== Station layout ==
The station features an enclosed ticketing/waiting area building adjoined to the inbound tracks. The southbound platform features some overhangs for protection from the elements but no major structures or services since the majority of people using this platform are inbound from the north due to there being only one more southerly stop. NJ Transit buses are frequently waiting adjacent to the southbound platform for connecting service for passengers arriving from stations northwards. The Point Pleasant Beach station features a fairly spacious parking lot adjoining the station building and northbound platform. Northbound trains serve track 1 and southbounds on track 2.
