= Elberon station =

NJ Transit rail station

Elberon
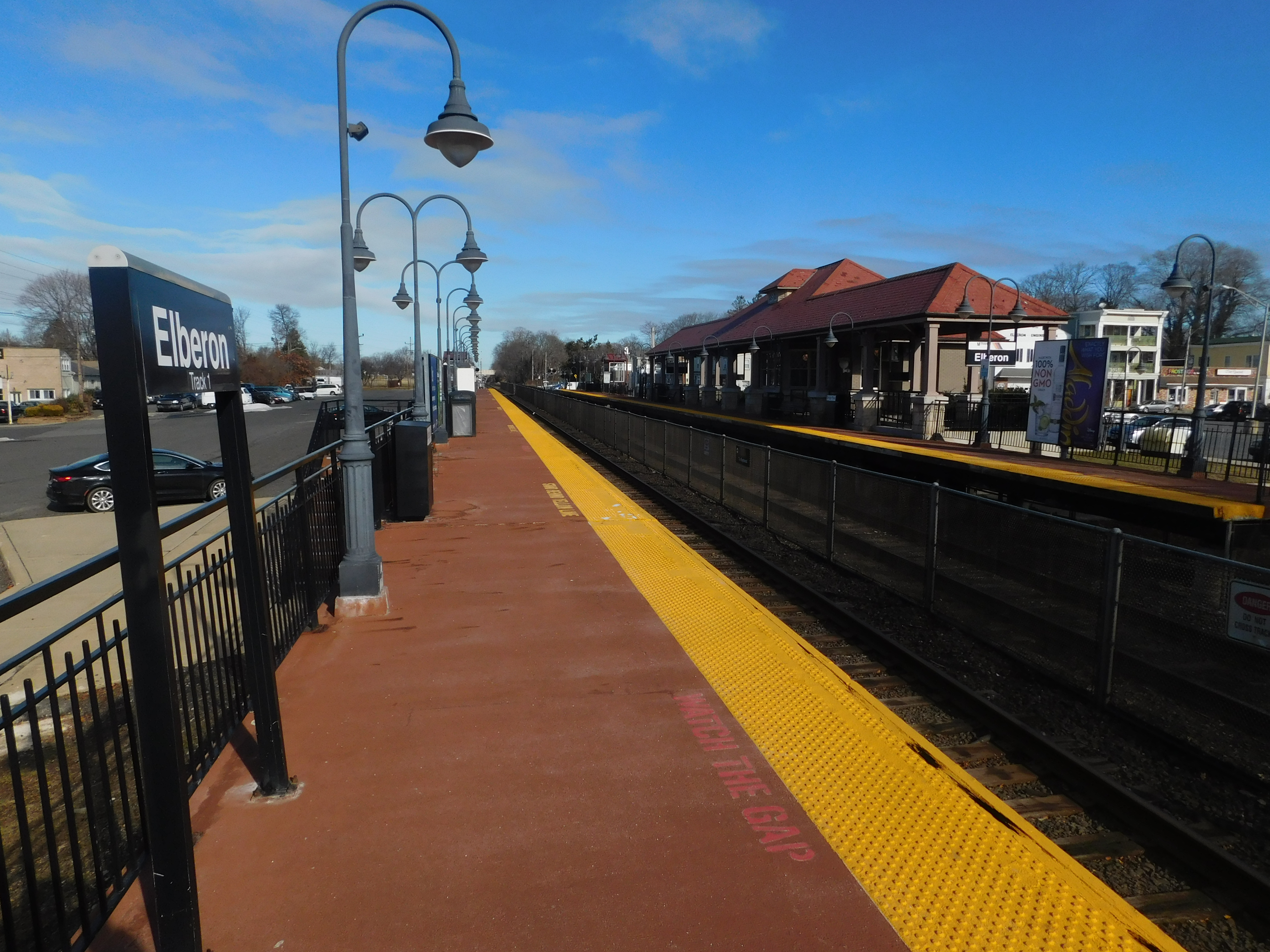
- The Elberon station facing north from the southern end of the Bay Head-bound platform in January 2018.

General information
- Location: Lincoln Avenue; Long Branch, New Jersey 07740
- Owner: NJ Transit
- Platforms: 2 side platforms
- Tracks: 2

Construction
- Platform levels: 1
- Parking: 229 spaces (222 standard, 7 accessible)
- Accessible: Yes

Other information
- Fare zone: 20

History
- Opened: August 27, 1875
- Rebuilt: April 1899–July 1899; October 14, 1993–June 3, 1996

Key dates
- November 26, 1898: Station depot burns first time
- May 27, 1988: Station depot burns second time

Passengers
- 2025: 85 (average weekday)
- Rank: 124 of 153

Services
Preceding station	NJ Transit	Following station
Allenhurst toward Bay Head	North Jersey Coast Line	Long Branch toward New York
Former services
Preceding station	New York and Long Branch Railroad	Following station
Deal toward Bay Head Junction	Main Line	West End toward Perth Amboy
- Elberon Railroad Station
- Formerly listed on the U.S. National Register of Historic Places
- Interactive map of Elberon Railroad Station
- Location: Lincoln Avenue, Elberon, NJ, USA
- Coordinates: 40°15′55″N 73°59′51″W
- Area: 0.5 acres (0.2 ha)
- Built: 1899
- Architectural style: Queen Anne, Richardsonian Romanesque
- NRHP reference No.: 78001777

Significant dates
- Added to NRHP: June 9, 1978
- Removed from NRHP: October 30, 1990
Location

Elberon is a railway station in the Elberon section of Long Branch, Monmouth County, New Jersey, United States. The station is served by New Jersey Transit's North Jersey Coast Line. Located at the intersection of Lincoln Avenue and Truax Road, It is the first station south of the electrified section of the line. The station has two side level high-level platforms and 229 parking spaces for commuter use.

== History ==
Elberon station opened in 1876 as the fourth of four stations on the New York and Long Branch Railroad, a railroad jointly owned and operated by the Pennsylvania Railroad and the Central Railroad of New Jersey. The railroad had a station downtown, along with stops at West End (Hollywood) and nearby Branchport. The depot caught fire on November 26, 1898 after burning telegraph wires ignited the depot, along with stations at Avon, Branchport and Asbury Park. Elberon burned completely while the rest suffered minor damage.

Elberon's depot was added to the New Jersey and National Registers of Historic Places in 1978. However, the depot caught fire on May 27, 1988, a complete loss. In October 1993, construction began on a replacement, which was finished and opened on June 3, 1996.

== Station layout ==
The station has high-level side platforms.

== See also ==
- Garfield Tea House
- Operating Passenger Railroad Stations Thematic Resource (New Jersey)
