= Long Branch, West Virginia =

Long Branch, West Virginia may refer to the following communities in the U.S. state of West Virginia:

- Long Branch, Fayette County, West Virginia
- Long Branch, Wyoming County, West Virginia
