= Long Branch station =

Long Branch station may refer to:

- Long Branch station (Maryland), an under construction light rail station in Silver Spring, Maryland, USA
- Long Branch station (NJ Transit), a commuter rail station in Long Branch, New Jersey, USA
- Long Branch GO Station, a commuter rail station in Toronto, Ontario, Canada

== See also ==
- Long Branch Loop, a streetcar loop in Toronto, Ontario, Canada
- Long Branch (disambiguation)
