= Long Branch, Virginia =

Long Branch, Virginia may refer to:

- Long Branch, Caroline County, Virginia, an unincorporated community in Caroline County
- Long Branch, Fairfax County, Virginia, an unincorporated community in Fairfax County
