= Rahway station =

NJ Transit rail station

Rahway
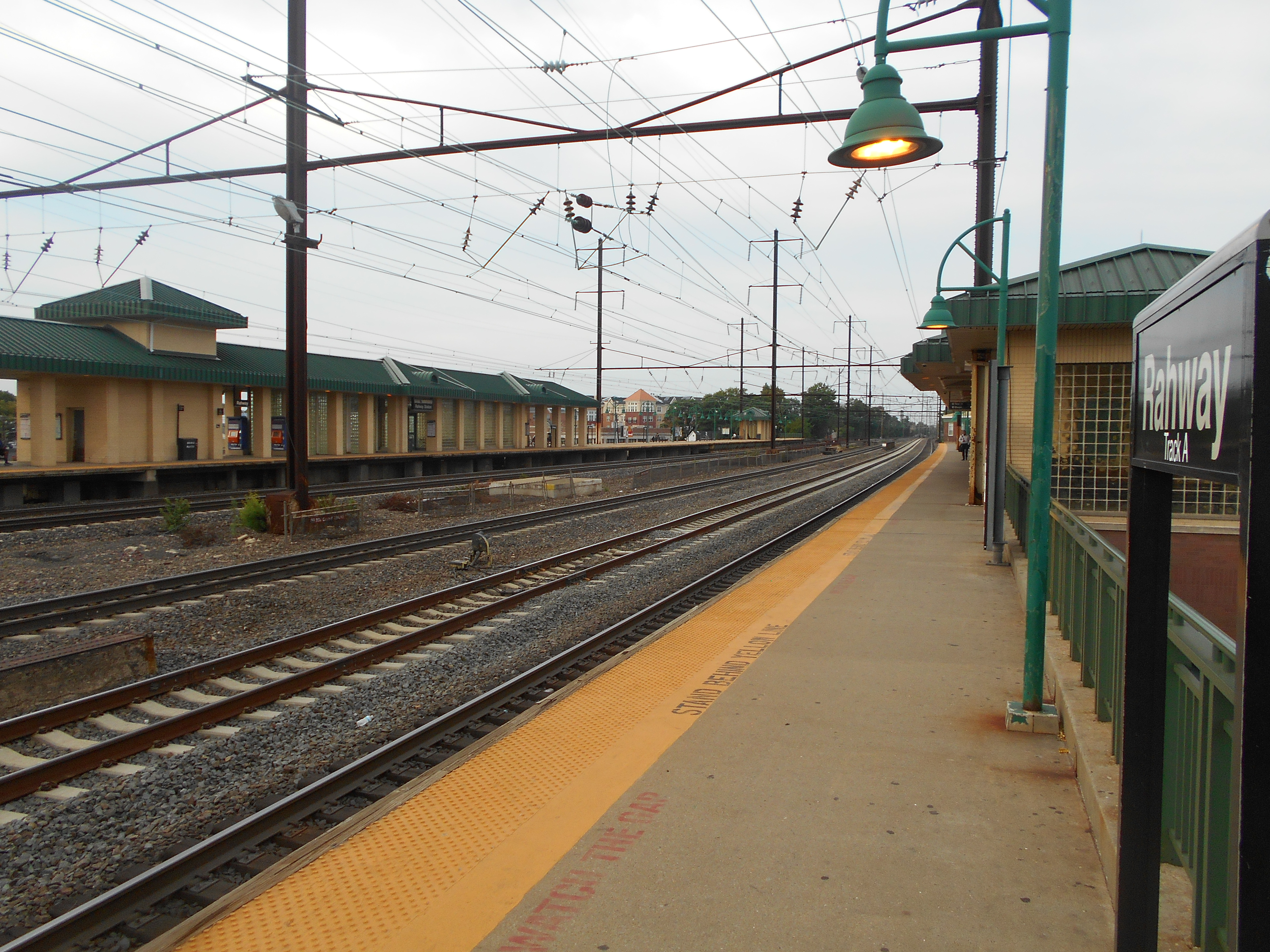
- Rahway station in August 2014

General information
- Location: Milton Avenue, between Irving & Broad Streets; Rahway, New Jersey
- Coordinates: 40.60634°N 74.27672°W
- Owner: New Jersey Transit
- Line: Amtrak Northeast Corridor
- Platforms: 1 side platform, 1 island platform
- Tracks: 6
- Connections: NJ Transit Bus: 48

Construction
- Parking: Yes
- Cycle facilities: Yes
- Accessible: Yes

Other information
- Fare zone: 8

History
- Opened: January 1, 1836
- Rebuilt: 1885; 1911–1913; 1974–1975; 1996–1998

Passengers
- 2025: 2291 (average weekday)
- Rank: 15 of 153

Services
| Preceding station | NJ Transit | Following station |
|---|---|---|
| Metropark toward Trenton | Northeast Corridor Line | Linden toward New York |
| Avenel toward Bay Head | North Jersey Coast Line | Linden toward New York |
Former services
| Preceding station | Pennsylvania Railroad | Following station |
|---|---|---|
| Metuchen toward Chicago | Main Line | Linden toward New York or Exchange Place |
| Perth Amboy Junction toward New Brunswick | New Brunswick Line | Scott Avenue toward New York or Exchange Place |
| Avenel toward Perth Amboy | Perth Amboy and Woodbridge Branch | Terminus |
Location

Rahway station is an NJ Transit train station in Rahway, New Jersey. It is served by the Northeast Corridor Line and North Jersey Coast Line. Rahway is just northeast of the Perth Amboy Junction, where the Northeast Corridor and the North Jersey Coast lines split at Union Tower. The Northeast Corridor has six tracks at the station; southbound trains use an island platform between the two westernmost tracks, while northbound trains use an island platform adjacent to the easternmost track.

== History ==
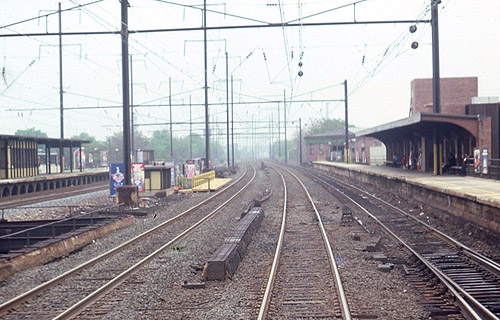
Rahway station in 1983

The first station at Rahway opened on January 1, 1836. It was destroyed by fire on November 12, 1884; a new station was completed in 1885. In November 1911, the Pennsylvania Railroad (PRR) awarded $3 million in construction contracts for a project to eliminate grade crossings in Rahway and Linden. The project raised 6 miles (9.7 km) of the line, eliminating 14 grade crossings; Linden, North Rahway, and Rahway stations were rebuilt. The four-track line was widened to six tracks. The elevated Rahway station opened in late July 1913. It had two island platforms and one side platform. The two-story station building had terra cotta walls and a tile roof. An under-track tunnel led to elevators to the island platforms; stairs connected the platforms to Milton and Irving streets.

The PRR became part of Penn Central in 1968. Amtrak took over intercity service in May 1971 and served Rahway station until November 1975. Local service was operated by Penn Central until 1976, Conrail until 1983, then NJ Transit. The New Jersey Department of Transportation approved $560,000 (later increased to $833,000) for renovations to the station. Construction began in February 1974 and was completed in August 1975. The 1913-opened station building was rebuilt with a new interior and a brick-and-steel facade; a shelter was added on the remaining island platform.

Another reconstruction took place from January 1996 to August 1998 at a cost of $12.6 million. The 1970s building was replaced with a new structure, the platforms were rebuilt, and new elevators were added for accessibility. The city purchased a commercial building on the east side of the station in 1998 and demolished it in 1999. The building site and an adjacent street were replaced with an 18,000 square feet (1,700 m^{2}) public plaza in 2000 at a cost of $600,000.
