= Long Branch (Troublesome Creek tributary) =

Stream in the American state of Missouri

Coordinates: 39°56′17″N 91°43′18″W

Long Branch is a stream in Lewis and Marion County in the U.S. state of Missouri. It is a tributary of Troublesome Creek.

Long Branch has the name of T. C. Long, the original owner of the site.

== See also ==
- List of rivers of Missouri
