= Long Branch, Caroline County, Virginia =

Unincorporated community in Virginia, US

Coordinates: 38°11′15″N 77°23′36″W

Long Branch is an unincorporated community in Caroline County, in the U.S. state of Virginia.
