= Long Branch, Wyoming County, West Virginia =

Community in West Virginia, US

Long Branch, West Virginia
- Unincorporated community
- Location within West Virginia Location within the United States
- Coordinates: 37°37′04″N 81°45′51″W
- Country: United States
- State: West Virginia
- County: Wyoming
- Elevation: 1,197 ft (365 m)
- Time zone: UTC-5 (Eastern (EST))
  - Summer (DST): UTC-4 (EDT)
- Area codes: 304 & 681
- GNIS feature ID: 1542334

Long Branch is an unincorporated community in Wyoming County, West Virginia, United States. Long Branch is located on County Route 6, 9.25 miles (14.89 km) west-southwest of Oceana.
