= Long Branch station (NJ Transit) =

NJ Transit rail station

Long Branch
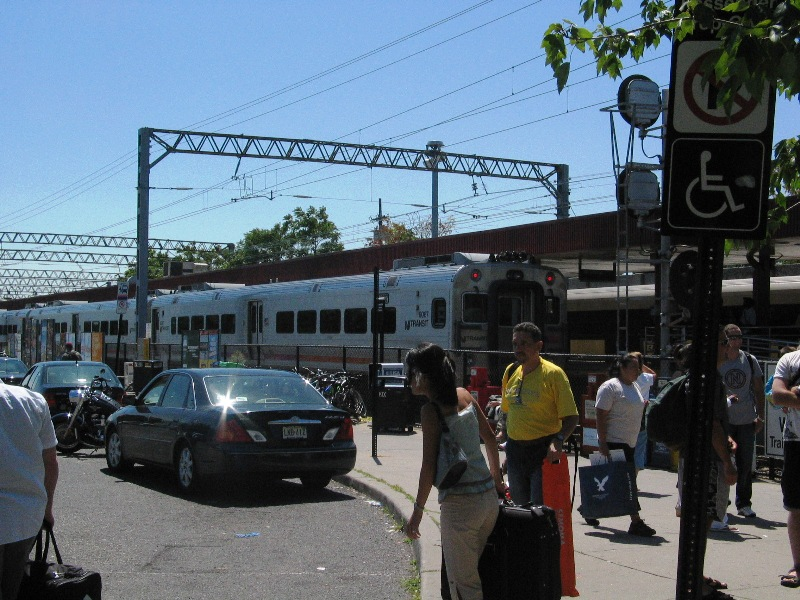
- Train stopped at Long Branch station

General information
- Location: 224 3rd Avenue; Long Branch, New Jersey 07740
- Coordinates: 40°17′49″N 73°59′17″W
- Owner: New Jersey Transit
- Platforms: 1 island platform
- Tracks: 2
- Connections: NJ Transit Bus: 831, 837; Academy Bus: Route 36, Shore Points

Construction
- Parking: 339 spaces (331 standard, 8 accessible)
- Cycle facilities: Yes
- Accessible: Yes

Other information
- Fare zone: 20

History
- Opened: June 25, 1875 (ceremonial); July 1, 1875 (regular service)
- Rebuilt: June 24, 1954–June 8, 1955; November 26, 1985–July 2, 1988

Passengers
- 2025: 853 (average weekday)
- Rank: 35 of 153

Services
Preceding station	NJ Transit	Following station
Elberon toward Bay Head	North Jersey Coast Line special event service	Monmouth Park toward New York
Elberon toward Bay Head	North Jersey Coast Line	Little Silver toward New York
Former services
Preceding station	New York and Long Branch Railroad	Following station
West End toward Bay Head Junction	Main Line	Branchport toward Perth Amboy
Location

Long Branch station is an active commuter railroad station in the city of Long Branch, Monmouth County, New Jersey. Located on 3rd Avenue in Long Branch, the station serves trains of NJ Transit's North Jersey Coast Line to and from New York Penn Station. Long Branch station serves as the southern terminus of electrified railroad service. Diesel railroad service continues south to Bay Head station in Ocean County. Long Branch Yard sits south of the station for trains that terminate at Long Branch. Long Branch station consists of a single high-level island platform, accessed from the parking lot via an underground tunnel.

Railroad service in Long Branch began with the construction of the New York and Long Branch Railroad from Perth Amboy in 1875. The station opened on July 1, 1875. An extension to nearby Elberon came in August 27, 1875. At the request of the city, the station depot was replaced in 1955. The current station opened on an unofficial basis on September 14, 1987 as part of a project that built an extension of electric service from Matawan. Full electric service at Long Branch station began on July 2, 1988.

== History ==
=== Replacement (1953–1955) ===
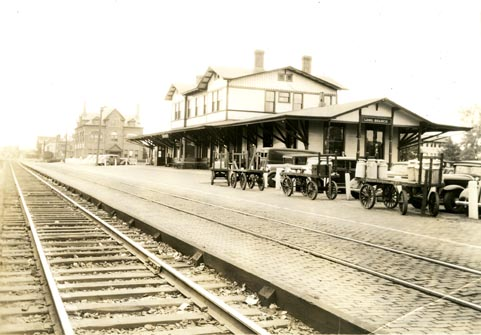
The former Long Branch station depot, c. 1940

Work on replacing the existing station began with the Long Branch City Commission putting the location of the train station in a commercial zoning area in early April 1953. Prior to this, the station had been in a residential zone. Earl T. Moore, president of the Central Railroad of New Jersey, wrote in a March 1953 that the railroad was interested in converting a modern office building the railroad using for offices into an active station depot. The roof would be replaced, alongside the shelters and platforms. A new baggage office would be offered in the building and some surrounding property would become a new parking lot. This parking lot would have 104 parking spaces for commuters and 27 spaces for commercial vehicles. The railroad was also considering that the platform alignment would be different to create more efficient service between New York City and Long Branch. Their plans considered making two side platforms to help facilitate that effort.

Moore stated that all of the railroad's plans required the zoning change and the approval of the Board of Public Utility Commissioners approving the discontinuation of the stations at West End and Branchport. To that point, Vineburg added that both stations were sites being considered for new supermarkets. Mayor Alexander Vineburg stated that the architect supplied by the railroad would do the best to make it look like one of the best depots in the state of New Jersey. Vineburg added that the railroad was interested in having the rest of the property developed, whether in house or sold to outside firms.

With negotiations following the zoning change, the railroad and the city came to agreement in November 1953 on the new station depot. Released to the public on November 17, the railroad agreed that a new, two-story station depot would replace the existing structure and the stations at Branchport and West End. Pending approval from the Board of Public Utility Commissioners, the Branchport and West End depots would be sold to commercial entities, alongside other railroad property in the city. The new station depot would be 80 by 40 feet (24 m × 12 m) and located just north of the existing Long Branch station depot on Third Avenue, which would be demolished. The first floor of the station depot would be all passenger facilities, alongside a new Union News Company business. The second story would be used for New York and Long Branch Railroad accounting, traffic and operating divisions. According to Vineburg, the new station would cost around $150,000 to build and construction be completed by the summer of 1954.

The city would take a parking lease that would run through 2003. Long Branch would lease the existing parking area at the Third Avenue station and increase its size from taxes incurred from the new building. The city would also retain the right for more parking in the future and if they wished to, a new stand for taxis to use. Long Branch would also maintain the property. A new Safeway supermarket would purchase land from the railroad and take 865 feet (264 m) of existing property. The city would then lease 75 feet (23 m) of land from Bath Avenue to serve as a park as part of a zoning variance made for Safeway.

Vineburg, alongside Harry Tallmadge of the Long Branch Chamber of Commerce, testified at a hearing in Newark for the elimination of West End and Branchport stations in order to facilitate construction of the new depot. On March 5, 1954, the Board of Public Utility Commissioners ruled that the railroad could abandon the station depots at West End and Branchport upon completion of the new station building. Public officials stated that the Elberon station would remain in service and that they wanted the new station depot done by the time of the Golden Jubilee in June 1954.

Bids opened for construction of the new station depot on June 4, 1954. The final contract was awarded to A.B. Schurman Construction Company, a firm from East Rutherford in Bergen County. While no official construction cost was announced, the Shurman bid was the lowest of the eleven bids received for the project. Construction on the new building would likely not take more than 175 days, was given a projected wrap date in December 1954. A request for a permit was in place by June 24, the same day that a bulldozer appeared on the site. The future station site was also blocked. A groundbreaking ceremony was held on June 24, with Aaron Schurman of the firm, Samuel Waldman, a local businessman, S. L. Mapes of the railroad, and government officials alongside Vineburg.

In late September 1954, Samuel Morris of the Long Branch Trust Company announced that they were planning to build a new branch at the West End station. This branch would involve using the existing station depot, a process they had done in Asbury Park. The branch would bring new drive-in banking to the area, which was growing in development. Morris added that they were in negotiations with the railroad to purchase the building, but any final deal would have to be approved by the state. However, a faulty wire in the basement of the building near the furnace caught fire on the morning of October 30. The north end of the station depot was engulfed in flame, with the waiting room and baggage room suffering severe damage. Firefighters were attempting to put the fire out by 5:30 a.m. The railroad had insurance on the depot and had still been in negotiations with the banking company. Because of the early hour, no train service was affected by the fire and with no agent, there was no change to ticket services. Estimated damages of the station depot were $2,500.

On June 6, 1955 it was announced that the new station depot would open on June 8, with celebrations beginning at 12:15 p.m. The ribbon cutting was held as expected on June 8. A luncheon was held at a restaurant in West Long Branch. With invited guests present, Vineburg and N.N. Bailey, Vice President of the Central Railroad of New Jersey, spoke at the ceremony. At that time, the stations at West End and Branchport were closed to passenger traffic. In early July 1955, a wrecker from Belford in Monmouth County began demolition work of the former station depot. The demolition contractor suggested that the demolition work would be finished by September 1955. Branchport station itself burned in an early morning fire on July 2, 1956.

=== Electrification (1982–1988) ===
With extension of electrification on the rebranded North Jersey Coast Line from South Amboy to Matawan station in 1982, NJ Transit officials agreed to push forward plans to extend it to Long Branch starting in 1983. With funds provided by the Urban Mass Transit Administration, the NJ Transit project would cost $57 million to extend to Long Branch and possibly be complete by 1986.

With federal cuts coming to NJ Transit in September 1983, $25 million in funding was lost for the agency, resulting in an automatic review of the capital projects. However, NJ Transit stated that the electrification project was one of the highest priorities and would likely not be affected by the federal funding reduction. The electrification extension was part of state bonds offered in 1968 and 1979 and aggravated commuters felt should be considered a top priority.

A meeting was held on September 29, 1983 between NJ Transit, city officials and some local business owners to discuss the electrification project in Long Branch. Viewing plans from 1978, the properties of a supermarket, diner, a gas station at the intersection of Morris and Third Avenue and a branch of a social services were all to be taken for the expansion of services in Long Branch. NJ Transit stated that they would be willing to reduce the properties required and that by November 1983, all properties to be acquired would be determined. At the same time, Monmouth Medical, looking to expand their hospital, requested that the city eliminate their use of Dunbar and Lowden Avenues to help facilitate. The expectation was that neither the electrification or expansion projects would affect the other. NJ Transit stated that the plans to go ahead with the project were in full swing, with bids being awarded in December 1984 with the hope of a completion in 1987.

By December 1983, the project cost ballooned to $72 million. NJ Transit received $30 million in 1982 for the electrification works in the state and $15 million would replace the signals from Long Branch to Matawan. $15 million would be acquired for Long Branch electrification in 1984 and the rest in 1985, but no guarantees were made. The $15 million from 1984 would go towards property acquisition and demolition, along with early construction. The final $42 million due in 1985 would go towards the electrification work, including new catenary towers and wires from Matawan to Long Branch, as well as the construction of electrical substations in Red Bank and Aberdeen Township.

Final station designs were changed, with the new station becoming a single high-level island platform instead of the existing side platforms. The ticket office would be located on the new platform, along with a waiting room. The new platform would be connected to the parking lot via an underground tunnel and stairs below the inbound tracks. A handicap accessible pedestrian ramp would be installed at Morris Avenue as well. In the original 1978 proposals, NJ Transit would have been required to condemn 9.5 acres (3.8 ha) of land. With the changes to the design, the damage was reduced to 1–2 acres (0.40–0.81 ha). This would result in the acquisiton of only the Mobil gas station at Morris and Third and the Golden Coach diner, alongside demolition of the existing station building. NJ Transit had also put consideration in acquiring the Pollak Clinic from Monmouth Medical and a part of land near Slocum Fuel Oil in order to expand parking. With Monmouth Medical's expansion, the clinic would be abandoned around 1986, in a similar timeline to the electrification project. This would create parking for 300 commuters. NJ Transit would also pay to improve the intersections and drains at the intersections of Third Avenue with Morris and Bath Avenues to help facilitate better traffic in and out.

Angst that the electrification was only going to Long Branch and not to Asbury Park caused concern the project may get postponed due to the latter's demands. Having oggten federal funding for a new transportation center in Asbury Park, Representative James J. Howard said the facility would be underused without electric service. He added that while he expected electric service to end at Long Branch, he felt Asbury Park be the end would encourage commuters to not have to drive to Long Branch. Howard said that he would look at getting funding from the United States Congress to extend the electricity all the way to Bay Head. NJ Transit responded by stating that going for Asbury Park now, which would cost an extra $30 million for the extension, has the potential delay the already acquired funding. They also felt that the angst was unfounded because most people would not drive to Long Branch to save time. However, the commentary from Howard scared several local officials, including Mayor Philip Huhn and City Council President Howard Woolley Jr. of Long Branch along with Theodore Labreque of the Monmouth County Transportation Coordinating Committee. None were opposed to Asbury Park becoming electrified in the future, but all were concerned about the funding being pulled due to lack of commitment.

However, with the 1984 funding pending, federal officials from the Urban Mass Transportation Administration (UMTA) questioned why NJ Transit wanted move some of $29 million set for the signal upgrade towards electrification projects. With the funding requiring an actual improvement in service, there was skepticism over the sudden change of plans. While NJ Transit was confident that they would get funding, they still had to testify about the project. NJ Transit approved $407,500 for track material the day before the hearing in May 1984. A meeting was held in Washington D.C. between federal officials and NJ Transit on the funding. NJ Transit stated that if the organization chooses to not fund the projects, the agency would still put in the switch revisions and changes needed between Rahway and South Amboy to help speed trains up. Alfred A. DelliBovi, the deputy administrator, stated that they would study the presentation from NJ Transit and make a recommendation within several weeks. He added that the decision would be made before the deadline on September 30, 1984.

However, no decision had been made by the deadline. John Villapiano and Richard Kelly, both candidates for the Monmouth County Board of Freeholders, wrote a letter to Ralph L. Stanley asking them to hurry up on the project. NJ Transit was going to send out bids for the design work in December 1984, but funding for the rest of the project required federal approval of the $20 million for 1984 and $37 million for 1985. DelliBovi stated that NJ Transit would not get funding until improvements are made to the Long Branch railroad yard. NJ Transit was proposing to manual crossing gates in the yard, despite using automatic gates everywhere else. DelliBovi stated that NJ Transit would need to prove the yard is safe before approving any funding. Governor Thomas Kean stated that he was concerned about the future of the funding and that he was pushing for funding in Washington D.C. himself.

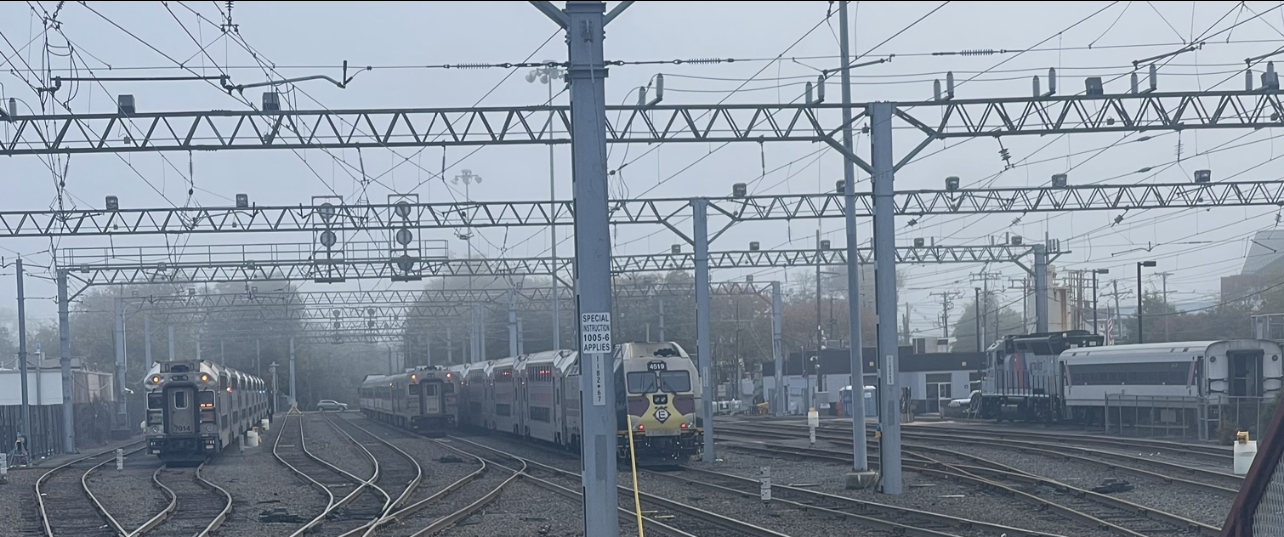
Long Branch yard, the site of the issues the UMTA had with NJ Transit's proposal

On October 31, 1984, Howard announced that the UMTA would release $18 million in funding for the project, less than the amount requested. However, he stated that it would ensure the completion of hte project. Howard added that UMTA wanted NJ Transit to determine whether Long Branch was a good location for a new railroad yard, but it would not affect funding. He also reiterated that he would push for funding for the extension to Asbury Park. UMTA offered to pay for the study requested, which would cost anywhere from $50,000–$100,000. The firm CH2M Hill would begin work on the study starting on November 26 with a report sent to the UMTA by the end of December 1984. NJ Transit stated that they could not continue with construction until the UMTA approved the study's results.

In February 1985, NJ Transit stated that they made changes, with the new railroad station's northern end being moved north of Morris Avenue to fix the requests of the UMTA. NJ Transit stated that the changes would result in a delay of six to seven months, bringing a mid-1988 completion date. The UMTA gave their official approval on March 6, 1985 with $30.3 million given to NJ Transit for the electrification project. NJ Transit stated that they would then move to the property acquisition phase and added that construction could start as early as the fall of 1985 with a completion between late 1987 and early 1988. The state would have to kick in 20% of the $57 million remaining after federal funding.

In June 1985, NJ Transit's Board of Directors approved the decision to choose an engineering firm to deal with the entire project, which would involve overseeing ten contracts. This would cost $6 million, with a final cost of $9.4 million once the design firm from Livingston was done. The contract would be for 3.5 years of work. A month later, NJ Transit requested bids on rail and materials for the construction of the new railroad yard in Long Branch and the modifications necessary to the mainline North Jersey Coast Line. The announcement of bids for official work came in the last week of July 1985, with the new station having a 373-space parking lot. Officially, NJ Transit would also acquire the Golden Coach, Mobil and Pollak Pavilion properties for expansion and construction of the new station.

It was announced in early September 1985 that commuters would be provided a trailer to serve as Long Branch station during the construction project. Because of the station depot being demolished as part of the work, NJ Transit would move the crews stationed there, along with 0.5-mile (0.80 km) of track to begin construction. The expectation was that the old station would be razed in early October. A temporary signal system would also be installed to ensure single-tracking through Long Branch was available during construction. NJ Transit authorized the awarding of five of the big contracts towards the electrification process on September 17, 1985. The contracts would total $50 million with bids opening between September–November 1985. By that point, work had begun at Long Branch station in preparation of construction. A groundbreaking ceremony was held on November 26, 1985 in Long Branch. Governor Kean and Howard were both at the ceremony. Howard continued his interest in extending the electrification to Asbury Park and Bay Head.

On September 14, 1986, NJ Transit introduced the new island platform and a parking lot for 104 vehicles. On September 22, the old parking lot would be closed for the remainder of construction. The catenary towers from Matawan to Long Branch were installed by this point as well. Progress on the yard was underway by the beginning of October. The new station building and tunnel opened in September 1987. Work on the installation of catenary wire began in October 1987.

NJ Transit operated the first electric run between Newark and Long Branch on June 28, 1988. Invited guests made the hour-long ride. Full passenger service at the new Long Branch station with electrification began on July 2, 1988.

== Station layout ==
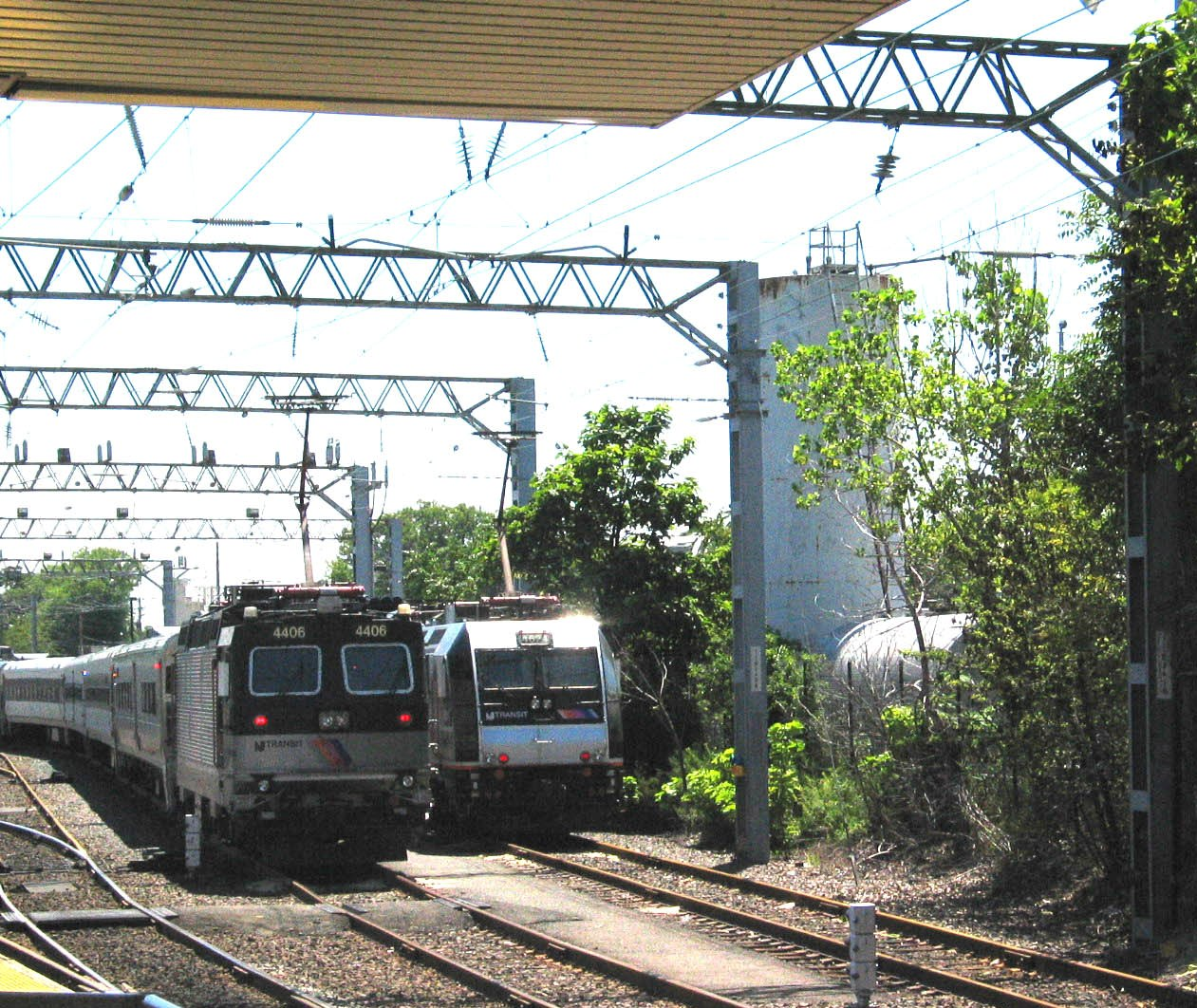
An ABB ALP-44 and Bombardier ALP-46 pass each other at Long Branch station in August 2007

Long Branch station serves as the southern terminus of electric railroad service on NJ Transit's North Jersey Coast Line. As a result, continuing service north towards New York Penn Station or south towards Bay Head requires in intra-platform transfer. During the peak hours, NJ Transit offers direct service between Bay Head and New York Penn Station without requiring the transfer. Long Branch station contains a single high-level island platform. This high-level platform contains a ticket office that operates in the mornings seven days a week and two ticket vending machines. The station also contains a 339-space parking lot owned by NJ Transit. Eight spaces at this station are handicap-accessible.

Connections to local buses are also available, with NJ Transit's 831 bus to Red Bank and 837 bus to Seaview Square in Ocean Township stopping at Long Branch station. Academy Bus operates service at Long Branch station, with its Route 36 service to Port Authority Bus Terminal and Shore Points service to Point Pleasant.
