= Bay Head station =

NJ Transit rail station

Bay Head
- The Bay Head train yard in August 2025. Bay Head station is in the lower right corner.

General information
- Location: Osborne Avenue at Birch Place; Bay Head, New Jersey 08742
- Coordinates: 40°04′34″N 74°02′47″W
- Owner: NJ Transit
- Platforms: 1 side platform
- Tracks: 2

Construction
- Parking: 101 spaces (99 standard, 2 accessible)
- Cycle facilities: Yes
- Accessible: No

Other information
- Station code: 23
- Fare zone: 23

History
- Opened: August 1, 1882
- Rebuilt: 1976
- Former names: Bay Head Junction

Passengers
- 2025: 135 (average weekday)
- Rank: 109 of 153

Services
| Preceding station | NJ Transit | Following station |
|---|---|---|
| Terminus | North Jersey Coast Line | Point Pleasant Beach toward New York |
Former services
| Preceding station | New York and Long Branch Railroad | Following station |
|---|---|---|
| Terminus | Main Line | Point Pleasant Beach toward Perth Amboy |
| Preceding station | Pennsylvania Railroad | Following station |
| Mantoloking toward Camden | Philadelphia and Long Branch Railroad | Terminus |
Location

Bay Head is a railway station in Bay Head, in Ocean County, New Jersey, United States. The station is served by trains on NJ Transit's North Jersey Coast Line, and it is the southern terminus for the line. The rail yard contains 33 acres (13 ha) of wetland inside the loop formed by the tracks used to turn around the trains. The rail yard borders Twilight Lake. Parking is free at the Bay Head station although the lot is only about a fourth of the size of the lot at the next station, Point Pleasant Beach, which requires payment.

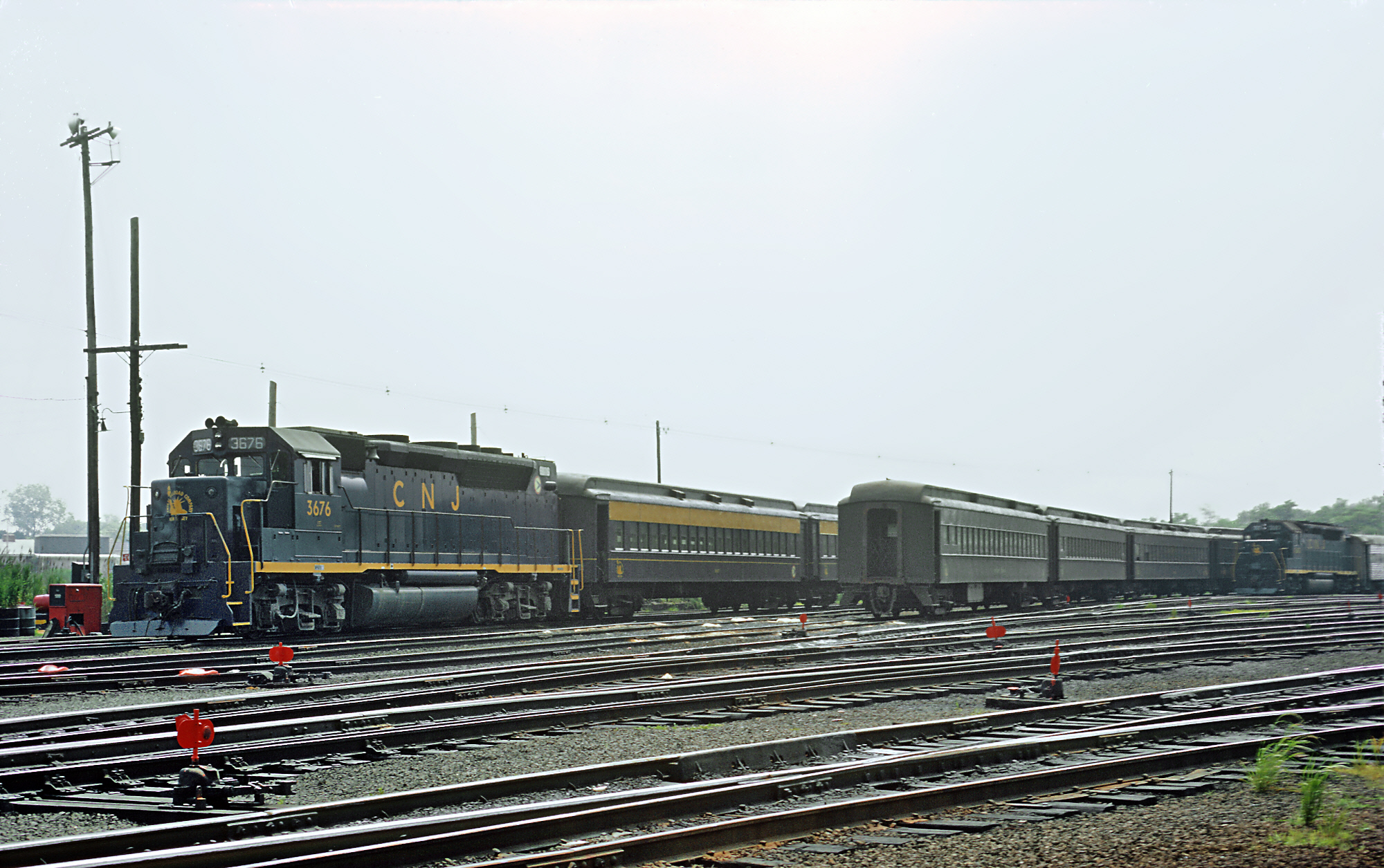
A Central Railroad of New Jersey commuter train at the yard in 1971

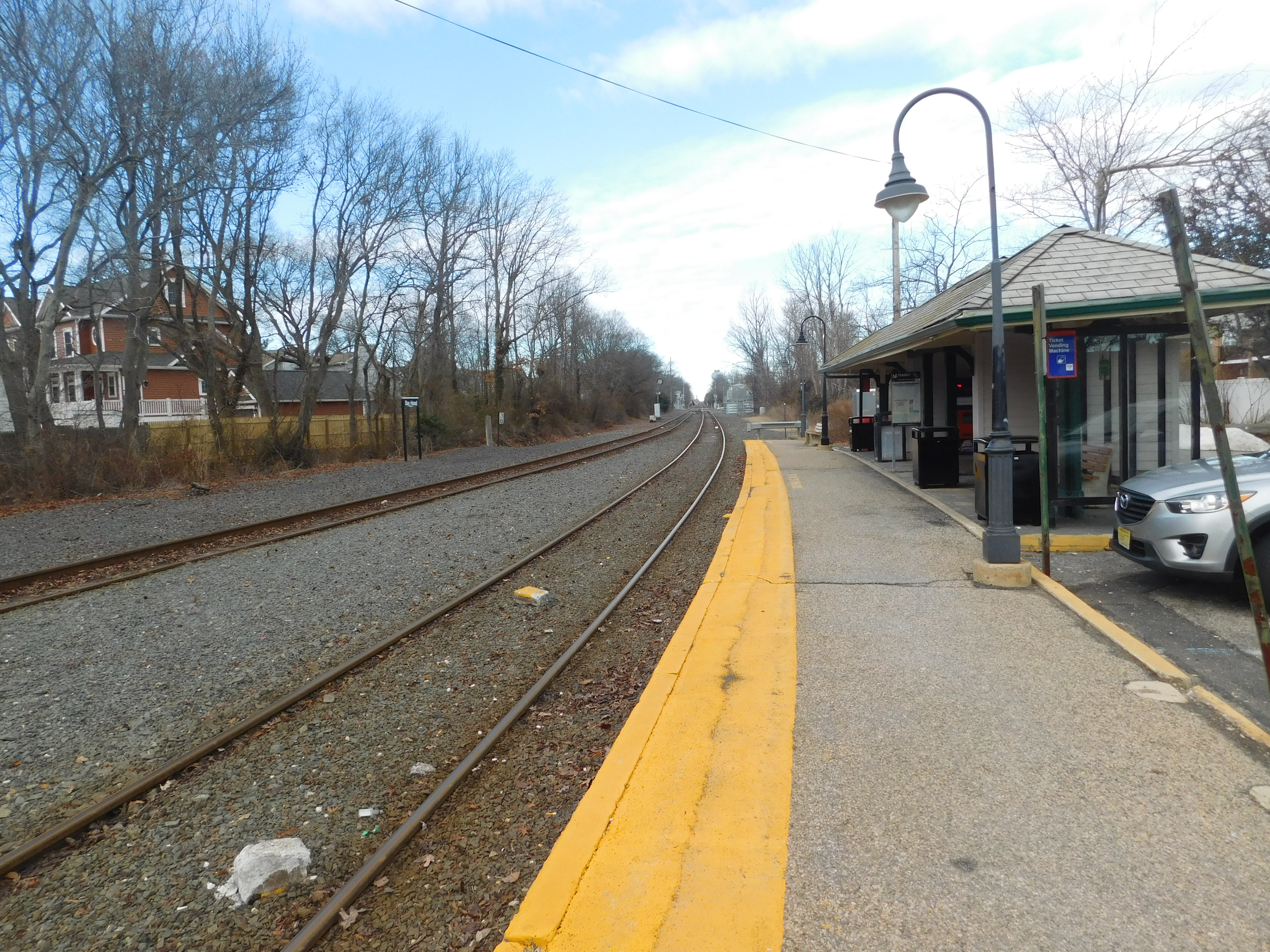
Bay Head station in January 2018

This station is not listed as disabled accessible by NJ Transit. Passengers must use the train stairs to climb up to the cars or descend to street level. There is no ramp or platform to aid the handicapped in boarding. Weekend ridership to the Bay Head station rises during the summer as beachgoing vacationers take the train to the beach. In May 2011, ticket vending machines were installed next to the station building at Bay Head.

== History ==
=== 1946 trestle fire ===
On the morning of December 1, 1946, a fire destroyed the Pennsylvania Railroad's trestle across Barnegat Bay in Seaside Park. The 300-foot (91 m) section of the wooden structure caught fire, requiring firefighters from Seaside Park and Ocean Gate to spend over six hours dousing the inferno. As a result of the response, the fire damage was limited to the center part of the span, interrupting rail service between Bay Head and Toms River. At Toms River, buses would take passengers to Long Branch. The damage in total ruined all the pilings and railroad ties in the original 300-foot (91 m) section and warped much of the rails on the trestle.

Service to Bay Head after the fire became bus only for Pennsylvania Railroad customers from Camden as trains 994, 995, 998 and 999 only operated to the station at Pemberton. From there, a bus would take the passengers to Bay Head. Passenger service would continue to Barnegat Pier from Toms River until December 14, 1948, at which point all the tracks between Toms River and Bay Head were abandoned.

== Station layout ==
NJ Transit trains stored in the Bay Head yard, looking north-northwest across the marsh, September 2025

The station has a low-level side platform serving trains in both directions, most trains also use track one, the doors open at the street.

== Bibliography ==
- United States Congress (1884). The Executive Documents of the House of Representatives for the First Session of the Forty-Eighth Congress, 1883-'84. Washington D.C.: Government Printing Office.
- Begley, Thomas C. (1950). Awards 4901 to 5000 Third Division Interpretation (Serial No. 92). Vol. 47. Chicago, Illinois: Champlin-Shealy Company.
