= Perth Amboy station =

NJ Transit rail station

Perth Amboy
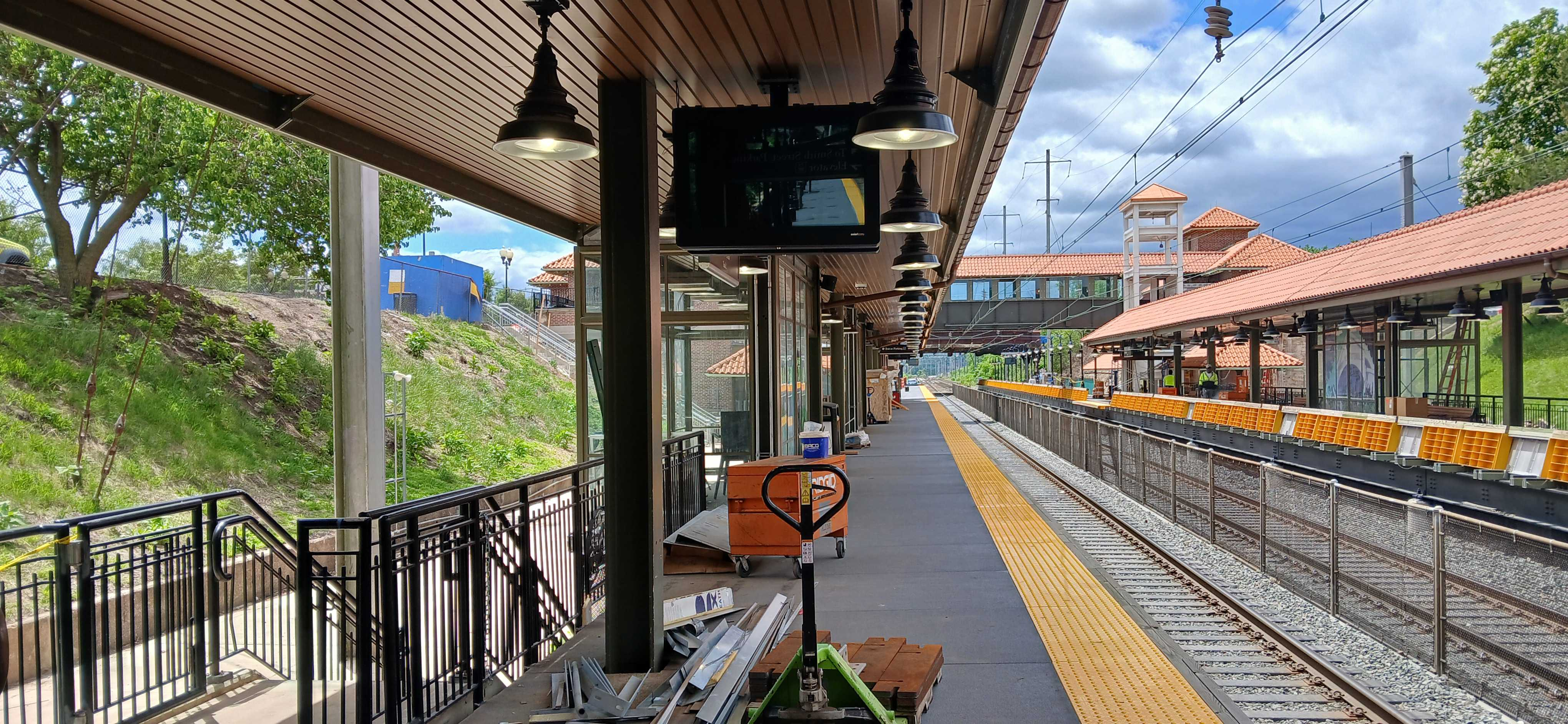
- Perth Amboy station in May 2026 with construction of the high-level side platforms underway.

General information
- Location: Elm Street between Smith and Market Streets; Perth Amboy, New Jersey 08861
- Owner: New Jersey Transit
- Platforms: 2 side platforms
- Tracks: 2
- Connections: NJT Bus: 48, 116, 813, 815, and 817

Construction
- Parking: Yes
- Cycle facilities: Yes
- Accessible: No

Other information
- Fare zone: 12

History
- Opened: June 28, 1875
- Rebuilt: 1928; April 21, 2022–present
- Electrified: 12 kV 25 Hz

Passengers
- 2025: 525 (average weekday)
- Rank: 55 of 153

Services
Preceding station	NJ Transit	Following station
South Amboy toward Bay Head	North Jersey Coast Line	Woodbridge toward New York
Former services
Preceding station	Central Railroad of New Jersey	Following station
Terminus	Elizabethport and Perth Amboy Branch	Barber toward Elizabethport
Preceding station	Pennsylvania Railroad	Following station
Terminus	Perth Amboy and Woodbridge Branch	Genasco toward Rahway
Preceding station	New York and Long Branch Railroad	Following station
South Amboy Junction toward Bay Head Junction	Main Line	Terminus
- Perth Amboy Station
- U.S. National Register of Historic Places
- New Jersey Register of Historic Places
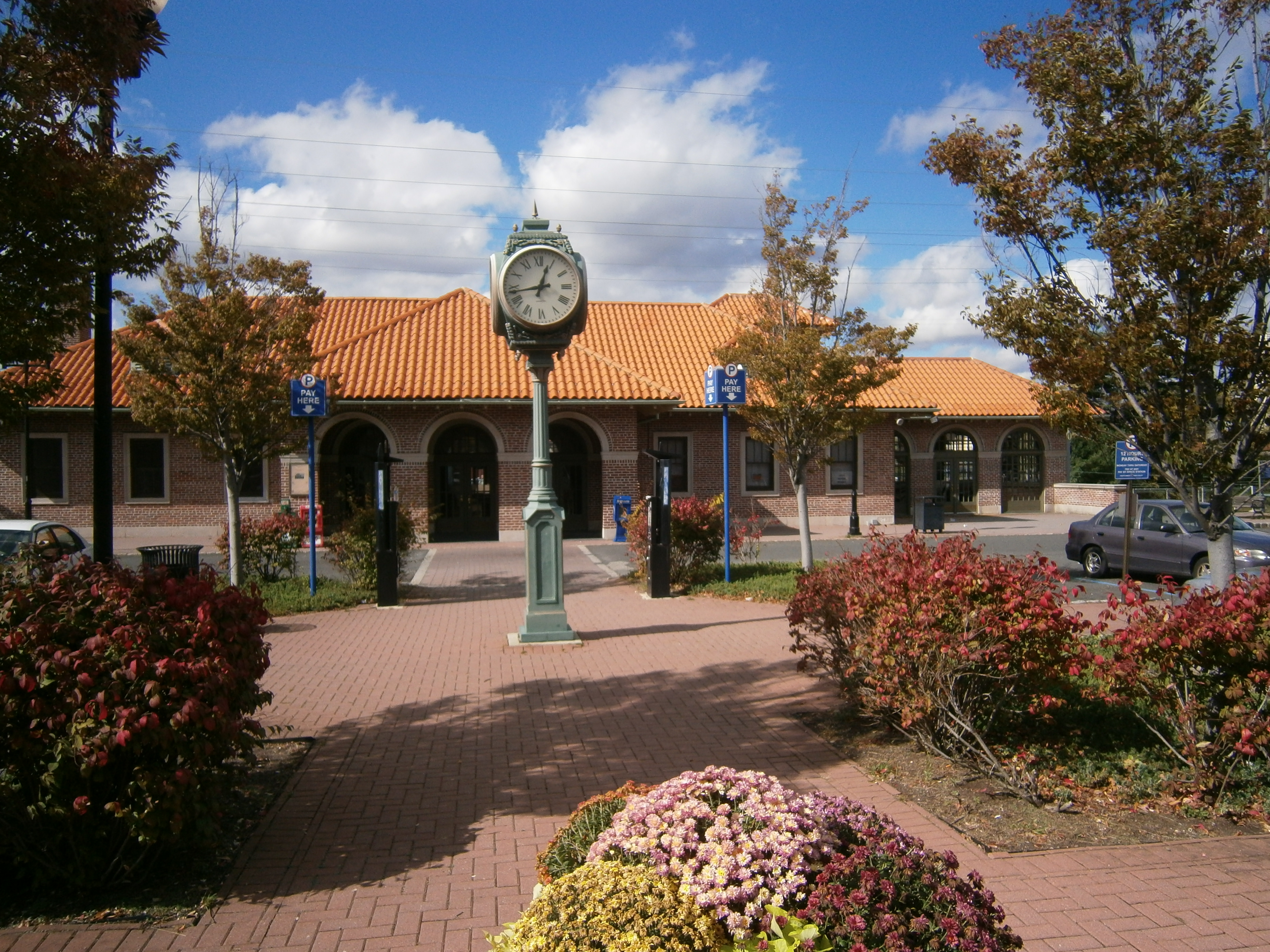
- Perth Amboy station's eastbound entrance
- Interactive map of Perth Amboy Station
- Coordinates: 40°30′33.35″N 74°16′25.68″W
- Built: 1928
- Architect: A.E. Owen
- Architectural style: Renaissance, Italian Renaissance Revival
- MPS: Operating Passenger Railroad Stations TR
- NRHP reference No.: 84002735
- NJRHP No.: 1899

Significant dates
- Added to NRHP: June 22, 1984
- Designated NJRHP: March 17, 1984
Location

Perth Amboy station is an active commuter railroad station in the eponymous city of Perth Amboy, Middlesex County, New Jersey. Located in a railroad cut between Smith and Market Streets, the station serves trains of NJ Transit's North Jersey Coast Line between Bay Head and New York Penn Station. Perth Amboy has two partial high-level side platforms as part of construction to upgrade the station from its previous low-level platforms. The rest of the station is under construction. The station houses, built by the Central Railroad of New Jersey, are on the state and National Register of Historic Places as part of the Operating Passenger Railroad Stations Thematic Resource.

== History ==
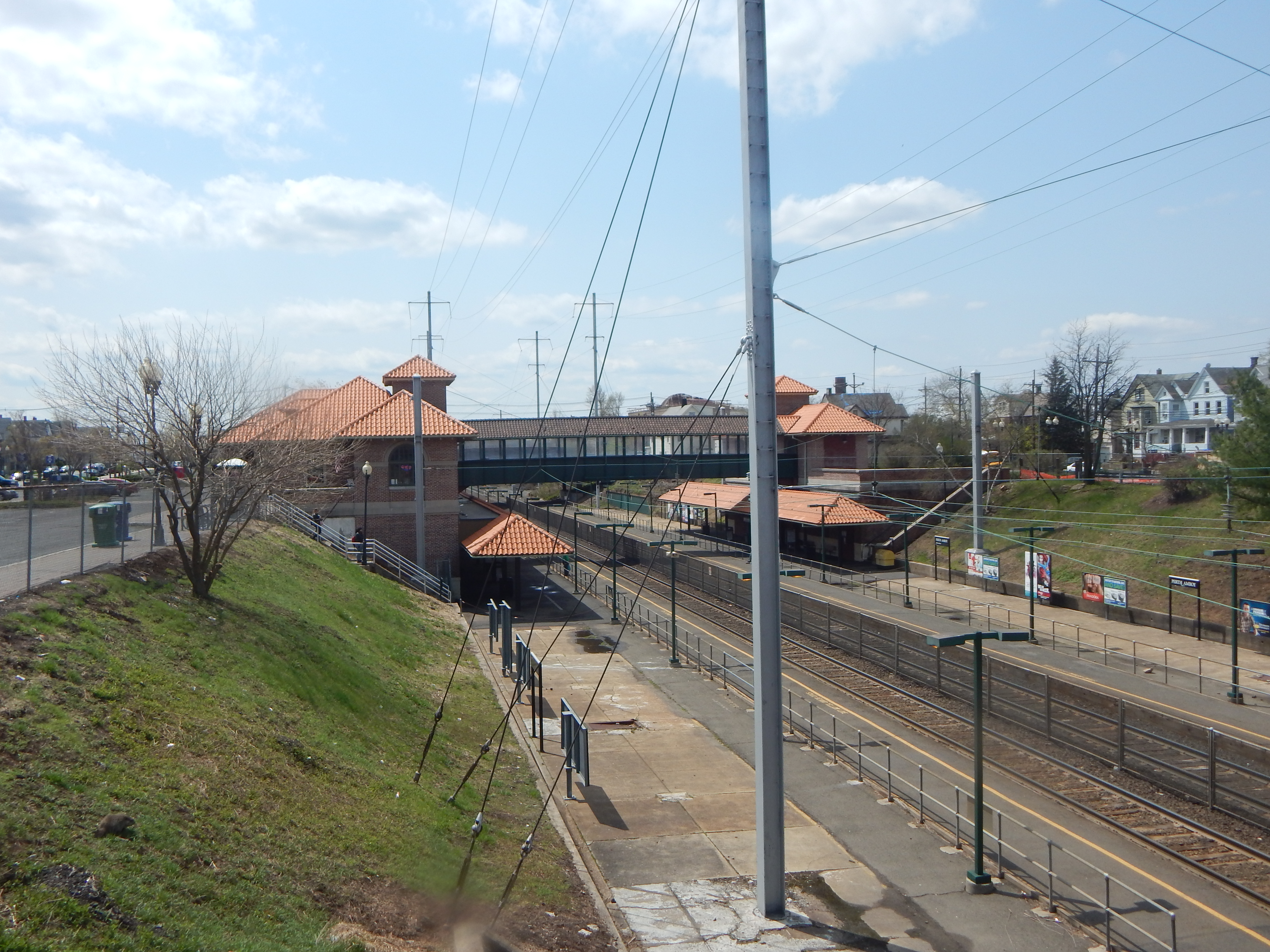
Perth Amboy station in April 2015

The station building was built in 1928 to replace an older structure built by the Central Railroad of New Jersey that was moved to Lewis Street and currently serves as a private residence there. It been listed in the state and federal registers of historic places since 1984 and is part of the Operating Passenger Railroad Stations Thematic Resource.

=== Station renovations ===
The station was refurbished in the 1990s. On June 16, 2010, New Jersey Transit (NJT) announced it had agreed to a $1 million (2010 USD) contract for a consultant to study the addition of high-level platforms to make the station compliant with the Americans with Disabilities Act of 1990 (ADA). NJ Transit's 2015 budget allocated $9.6 million for the final design for a major renovation that would make the station compliant with the ADA by adding elevators, and also include canopies and upgrades to communication systems. Ground was broken on the $45 million (2022 USD) project on April 21, 2022, with Governor Phil Murphy in attendance. The first high level platforms opened in May 2024 and can only accommodate 4 cars while the rest of the construction continues.

== Station layout ==
Perth Amboy has two tracks and two high-level concrete side platforms. The platforms are located below street level in a cut. At street level, there is a ticket office.

== See also ==
- List of New Jersey Transit stations
- National Register of Historic Places listings in Middlesex County, New Jersey
- Perth Amboy Ferry Slip

== Bibliography ==
- Honeyman, Abraham Van Doren (1923). History of Union County, New Jersey 1664-1923 · Volume 1. New York, New York: Lewis Historical Publishing Company.
