= Brielle Draw =

- Coordinates: 40°06′22″N 74°03′00″W
- Carries: New York and Long Branch (to 1976); Conrail; North Jersey Coast Line
- Crosses: Manasquan River
- Locale: Brielle; Point Pleasant Beach
- Owner: New Jersey Transit
- Maintained by: NJT
- ID number: NJT 1362-157

Characteristics
- Design: Bascule bridge
- Total length: 1,162.59 feet

History
- Opened: 1911

Location
- Interactive map of Brielle Draw

Brielle Draw is a railroad bascule bridge over Manasquan River in Brielle, Monmouth County and Point Pleasant Beach, Ocean County, New Jersey, United States west of the Manasquan Inlet to the Atlantic Ocean. It carries a single track of the New Jersey Transit Rail Operations (NJT) North Jersey Coast Line (MP 36.38) between Manasquan and Point Pleasant Beach stations. It was once part of Central Railroad of New Jersey (CNJ), New York & Long Branch Railroad (NYLB) and Pennsylvania Railroad (PRR) operations. The line is also served by the River Draw over the Raritan River, the Morgan Draw over Cheesequake Creek, the Oceanport Draw over Oceanport Creek and the Shark River Draw.

== See also ==
- NJT movable bridges
- Glimmer Glass Bridge
- Effects of Hurricane Sandy in New Jersey
