= Laurence Harbor station =

Proposed commuter rail station in New Jersey

Coordinates: 40.4449°N 74.2459°W

Laurence Harbor

General information
- Owner: New Jersey Transit
- Line: North Jersey Coast Line

Construction
- Accessible: yes

Services
Preceding station	NJ Transit	Following station
Aberdeen-Matawan toward Bay Head	North Jersey Coast Line	South Amboy toward New York
Location

Laurence Harbor was a proposed station that was to be located along New Jersey Transit's North Jersey Coast Line between the South Amboy and Aberdeen-Matawan stations. The station was to be in the Laurence Harbor section of Old Bridge, New Jersey.

The station was first proposed in the 1980s, although no progress was made until August 2001, when the transportation officials said the official station could be constructed within several years. After several years of proposals, along with the passing of a high opposer in 2003, the station came up once again in 2008. That year, the proposed Metropark South was brought back to the Old Bridge council by developer Michael Alfieri. His proposal also brought up the plans for new residential homes, commercial businesses along with the new station. The proposal was conditionally accepted in November of that year. As of 2009, there is no forward on the actual station being constructed.

== History ==
=== 1985 proposal and 2001 proposal ===
The location of Laurence Harbor in Middlesex County and New Jersey

The idea for a station in Laurence Harbor was first proposed by developer in Michael Alfieri in 1985. His original proposal in the community was to create and constructed a so-called "Metropark South", to consist of residential homes, commercial businesses, and a brand-new train station. The proposal received approval, but only the residential portion of the proposal was ever built. This residential area, consisting of high-class townhouses, is known as "Bridgepointe". In August 2001, several years after the partially constructed project was started, the staff at New Jersey Transit proposed the design and construction of a station at Laurence Harbor near Exit 120 on the Garden State Parkway, which would serve the North Jersey Coast Line. At that time, the tracks passed through Laurence Harbor between the South Amboy and Aberdeen-Matawan stations. A spokesperson from New Jersey Transit reported that the state is working with Old Bridge Township (where Laurence Harbor is a part) to make preliminary designs. The costs for the designs began around $300,000 (2001 USD) for a two-year study. The station was proposed to relieve major congestion on four of the major state highways in the community including Route 18, Route 34, Route 35, and U.S. Route 9. Old Bridge's mayor, Barbara Cannon, gave full support for the new station, who previously passed a unanimous resolution for the proposal. The township also reported that this would help qualify Old Bridge as a city and receive more state funding.

A week later, the figures for a brand-new station at Laurence Harbor were released, saying the station would take five years to construct, with costs ranging from $25 million–$30 million (2001 USD) of funding from the state of New Jersey and the federal government. The station would also relieve the busy Aberdeen-Matawan station, which at the time hosted about 3,500 commuters daily. Most of the city council and mayor supported the deal, except for councilman Joseph Hoff. Hoff believed the train station was a good idea, but there were a number of outstanding issues before plans for one could go forward. Hoff stated that the additional truck traffic and the safety of the pedestrians in the area were also a concern. These concerns would also get worse when the Atrium II office complex would be completed on the western side of Exit 120. Another major issue was the traffic congestion at Exit 120 itself, which at rush hour was "atrocious". By November 2002, the station had not received any studies on the general location were not conducted by New Jersey Transit. Although the proposal still had support by the community, several citizens, including Joseph Hoff, were still questioning it. Hoff cited that New Jersey Transit has not put any interest forward and would just end up becoming another parking lot rather than a tax revenue. He reported however, that if residential homes and commercial businesses were constructed, it would be beneficial to Laurence Harbor. The other issue that Hoff maintained, was that it would risk the lives of children heading to and from Laurence Harbor Memorial School by affecting the traffic in the area.

=== 2008 proposal ===
After the 2002 report by Joseph Hoff, the township councilman in opposition to the Laurence Harbor train station, the 74-year-old politician himself died on November 20, 2003. The proposal for the new train station began to wane for sometime, until 2005, when Aliferi, the designer and constructor of "Bridgepointe" returned to the township board. This time Aliferi proposed the continuation of construction for the two decade-old project, with several community groups either opposing the plan, or raising concerns. The proposal was to include a seven-story hotel, 83 single-family homes, two parking garages and 15,000 square feet (1,400 m^{2}) of retail space. The local highway, Laurence Parkway, would also receive improvements to better handle the new development. Concerns were also raised by the New Jersey Turnpike Authority, the agency that governs the Garden State Parkway, about the effects on the off-ramp for Exit 120. On February 8, 2006, the Old Bridge Township Council turned over on a 7-0 vote for the new development. Aliferi sued the township, taking the case to the New Jersey Superior Court. A judge sided with Aliferi, citing that the developer can bring the proposal back to the council. On February 21, 2007, the proposal was rejected again, partially citing that Aliferi has no interest in building the hotel or the offices.

On November 17, 2008, Aliferi returned yet again to the Old Bridge Township Council. The council this time gave the go-ahead for construction to begin with a condition. The council set that if Aliferi wants to construct it, he has to include commercial development before constructing residential homes to minimize community impact. Also before construction would begin, Aliferi would also have to return for a new General Development Permit (GDP). The proposal for the hotel that Aliferi brought up, was held off due to the location, which was on depressed elevation. There was no official decision for a new train station, which was proposed several times during Aliferi's plans.

== See also ==
- Morgan Draw
- List of New Jersey Transit stations
- Metropark (NJT station)
