= Morgan Draw =

- Coordinates: 40.46161°N 74.25968°W
- Carries: Conrail; North Jersey Coast Line
- Crosses: Cheesequake Creek
- Locale: Morgan and Laurence Harbor, New Jersey
- Owner: NJ Transit
- Bridge Hunter ID: NJT 403; BH 60655

Characteristics
- Design: Bascule
- Traversable?: Yes; by train only
- Longest span: 79 ft (24 m)
- No. of spans: 6
- Piers in water: 5
- Clearance below: 3 ft (0.91 m)

Rail characteristics
- No. of tracks: 2
- Electrified: Yes

History
- Engineering design by: Harry L. Thomas
- Constructed by: Scherzer Rolling Lift Bridge Co.
- Construction end: 1912
- Rebuilt: 2012 (rehabilitated post-Superstorm Sandy)

Morgan Draw is railroad moveable bridge over the Cheesequake Creek between the Morgan section of Sayreville and Laurence Harbor in Old Bridge in Middlesex County, New Jersey, United States. Located at MP 0.2 near the mouth on the Raritan Bay, the bascule bridge lies just upstream of the New Jersey Route 35 crossing. It is owned and operated by New Jersey Transit Rail Operations (NJT) and substantially rehabilitated in 2005-2008. A storm surge during Hurricane Sandy in 2012 caused severe damage to the bridge.

== Operations ==
The Cheesequake Creek is used for recreational boating. The bridge serves the North Jersey Coast Line between the South Amboy and Aberdeen-Matawan stations. It is also used by Conrail. As of 2008 the Code of Federal Regulations stipulated that it open on signal; except that, at least four hours notice is required from January 1 through March 31 from 6 p.m. to 6 a.m.; from April 1 through April 30 and November 1 through November 30 (from 10 p.m. to 6 a.m. Monday through Thursday, and midnight Sunday through 6 a.m. Monday; and rom December 1 through December 31 from 10 p.m. to 6 a.m.

== See also ==
- NJT movable bridges
- Laurence Harbor (NJT station)
- List of crossings of the Raritan River
