= Morgan, New Jersey =

Populated place in Middlesex County, New Jersey, US

- Unincorporated community
- Location of Morgan in Middlesex County Inset: Location of county within the state of New Jersey
- Coordinates: 40°28′00″N 74°16′06″W
- Country: United States
- State: New Jersey
- County: Middlesex
- Borough: Sayreville
- Elevation: 66 ft (20 m)
- GNIS feature ID: 878475

Morgan is a neighborhood in Sayreville in Middlesex County, in the U.S. state of New Jersey, named for Charles Morgan III who purchased the land on May 7, 1710.

The Morgan Draw, constructed over the Cheesequake Creek in 1912, serves the North Jersey Coast Line.

A month before the end of World War I in 1918, the neighborhood was heavily damaged by the T. A. Gillespie Company Shell Loading Plant explosion.

Morgan Heights is a neighborhood on the bluff in the district.

== See also ==
- List of neighborhoods in Sayreville, New Jersey
