= Raritan Bay Slag Superfund Site =

Coordinates: 40.4641°N 74.2583°W

Raritan Bay Slag
- Superfund site
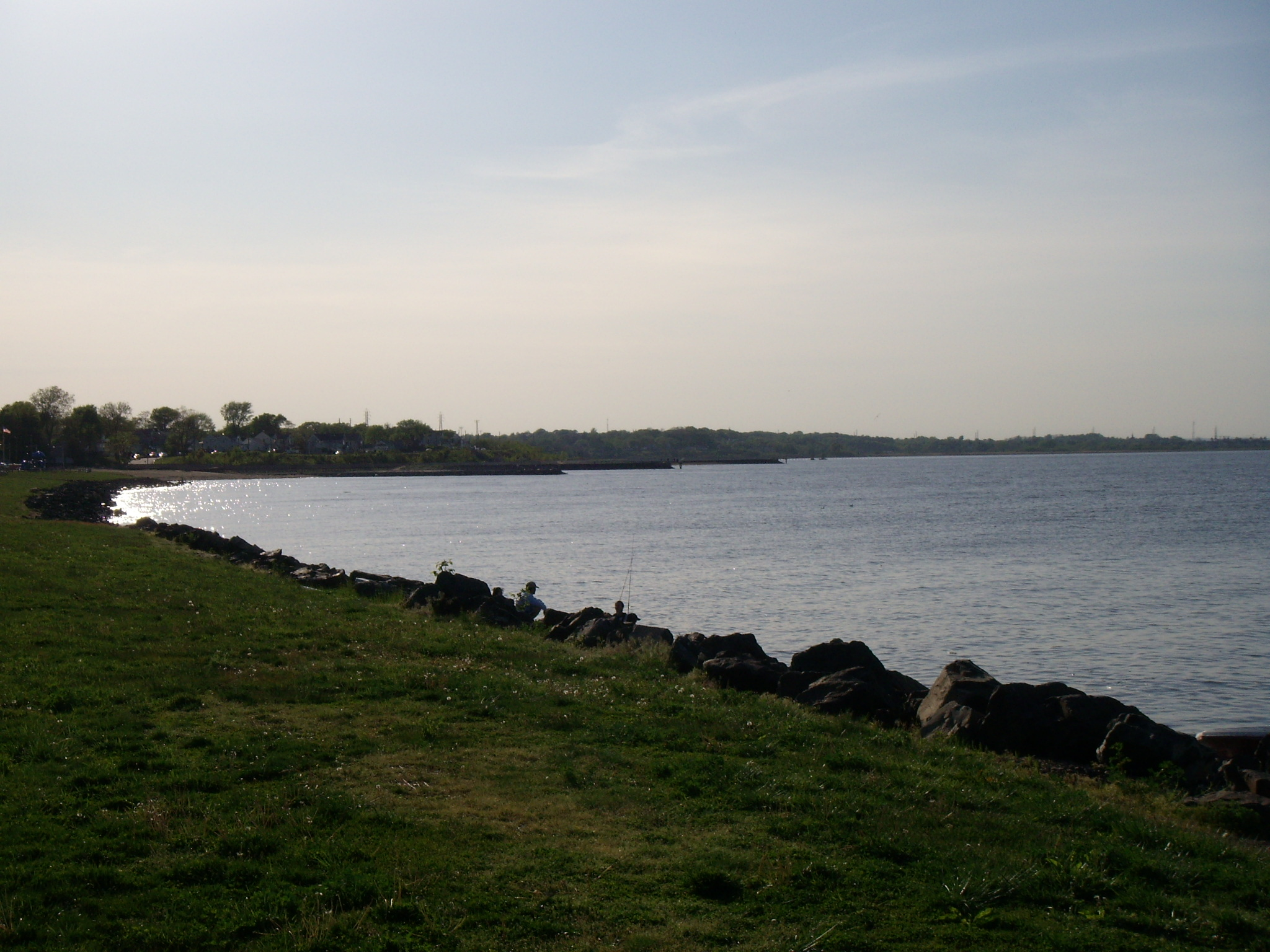
- The seawall on the Raritan Bay in Laurence Harbor

- Location within Middlesex County, New Jersey
- Location: Old Bridge Township & Sayreville Borough, Middlesex, New Jersey

Information
- CERCLIS ID: NJN000206276
- Contaminants: Lead, antimony, arsenic, and copper
- Responsible parties: National Lead Company

Progress
- Proposed: April 9, 2009
- Listed: November 4, 2009

The Raritan Bay Slag Superfund Site consists of a seawall along the coast of the Raritan Bay in the Laurence Harbor section of Old Bridge Township, New Jersey, United States. The seawall itself is made of slag. In this seawall, are large concentrations of lead, antimony, arsenic, and copper. The lead in particular has contaminated the nearby soil and surface water. The slag deposits are a by-product from NL Industries (formerly known as National Lead Company), a lead smelting company, dumping its wastes in the Raritan River. The New Jersey Department of Environmental Protection (NJDEP) investigated the area and found large concentrations of metals to be dangerous to human health. The NJDEP called the United States Environmental Protection Agency (EPA) to investigate the area further, which resulted in some of the slag being physically removed and the toxic areas being fenced off.

== Origins ==
Located in Laurence Harbor is the Old Bridge Waterfront Park, a boardwalk where the Superfund site is located. The cause of the Superfund site is a lead smelting company, National Lead Company, which currently goes by the name NL Industries. NL Industries specializes in lead-based "quality-of-life" products such as paint and metal bearings. The factories belonging to NL Industries have led to several lawsuits due to environmental pollution, similarly to this Superfund site.

=== Community history ===
The Raritan Bay is located in Laurence Harbor, an unincorporated community in Old Bridge Township and runs to Sayreville. Old Bridge Waterfront Park is a boardwalk in Laurence Harbor where the focus of this Superfund site is located. The boardwalk attracts tourists and locals alike for several beachside activities. These activities range from swimming and fishing to walking on the beachfront.

=== Company history ===
NL Industries, formerly known as National Lead Company, is a lead smelting company, founded in Philadelphia and currently located in Dallas, Texas. Founded in 1772, NL Industries specialized in lead solder, piping, and metal bearings which eventually changed to lead paint in the 1920s. The experimentation of titanium dioxide gave NL Industries a foothold in the paint industry. In later years, the company sold products to aid in the manufacturing of castor oil, rayon, airplanes, and oil drills. Due to multiple lawsuits because of environmental hazards created by NL Industries factories, NL Industries changed its name from the National Lead Company to NL Industries.

== Superfund designation ==
Elevated amounts of lead, antimony, arsenic, and copper were found by the New Jersey Department of Environmental Protection. Due to the concentrated amount along the shore of Laurence Harbor and Sayreville, the NJDEP called the EPA to evaluate the site. The EPA detected high levels of lead in the slag, soil, and water. Due to the concentration of harmful metals, action to clean up the site was recommended.

=== State intervention ===
The New Jersey Department of Environmental Protection, or NJDEP for short, have identified several dangerous heavy metals at the Raritan Bay Slag Site. These heavy metals include elevated concentrations of lead, antimony, arsenic, and copper. In addition to the location in Laurence Harbor, another area of concern was found on the Sayreville waterfront. The western jetty at the Cheesequake Creek inlet and waterfront area is the specific location of the area of concern. The NJDEP requested for the EPA to evaluate the Raritan Bay Slag site.

=== National intervention ===
The EPA evaluated the Raritan Bay Slag site in 2009. After confirming the findings of the NJDEP, the EPA’s results showed elevated levels of lead in the slag, soil, sediment and surface water. Several locations along the shoreline were marked as “dangers to public health and safety”. Remedial action and cleanup as soon as possible was recommended by the EPA.

== Health and environmental hazards ==
The NJDEP and EPA’s observations have shown excessive amounts of lead, arsenic, antimony, and copper in the site. Lead is extremely dangerous, lethal if ingested, and can cause developmental issues for children and fetuses. Arsenic increases the chance of cancer, however the amount of arsenic present in the site is too small to cause serious human harm.

=== Lead ===
Ingestion of lead at the correct dosage can kill. Accumulation of lead in the body can damage the gastrointestinal and nervous system, kidneys, or red blood cells. Children, infants, and fetuses are more affected by lead than adults. Lead can cause learning difficulties, stunt physical and mental growth, or threaten fetal development. The amount of lead needed to cause these effects is unknown as the effects can occur due to incredibly small amounts.

== Cleanup ==
The slag and other hazardous materials along the shoreline were recommended by the EPA to be physically removed from the area. Contaminated soil and surface water was also removed and treated. The excavation process began in November 2016.

=== Initial cleanup ===
Initial inspection of the site took place from September 2010 to June 2011. After the elevated quantities of heavy metals in the lag, soil, sediment, and surface water were identified, the EPA published a Record of Decision for the site in May 2013. Excavation, dredging and off-site disposal were the EPA’s preferred method of cleanup. Slag, battery casings, and any other polluted material along with the soil the materials have contaminated would be dug up or dredged and disposed of at off-site facilities. The surface water would be monitored to test if the removal increases any risks.

=== Current status ===
In September 2016, $7 million of federal funding was awarded to the region. The Superfund State Contract was signed in July 2016. Field work officially began in November 2016. Partial site cleanup was completed in late fall of 2017.

In 2021, dissatisfied with the progress of the cleanup, the EPA took over control of the site. The EPA claimed that National Lead was essentially dragging its feet in showing progress in cleanup design studies, both in June of 2020 and April of 2021, that they still continued to lack sufficient detail and were deemed unacceptable. The take over came five years after National Lead was given multiple extensions to provide the report.

== See also ==
- Slag
