= Laurence Harbor, New Jersey =

Populated place in Middlesex County, New Jersey, US

- Census-designated place
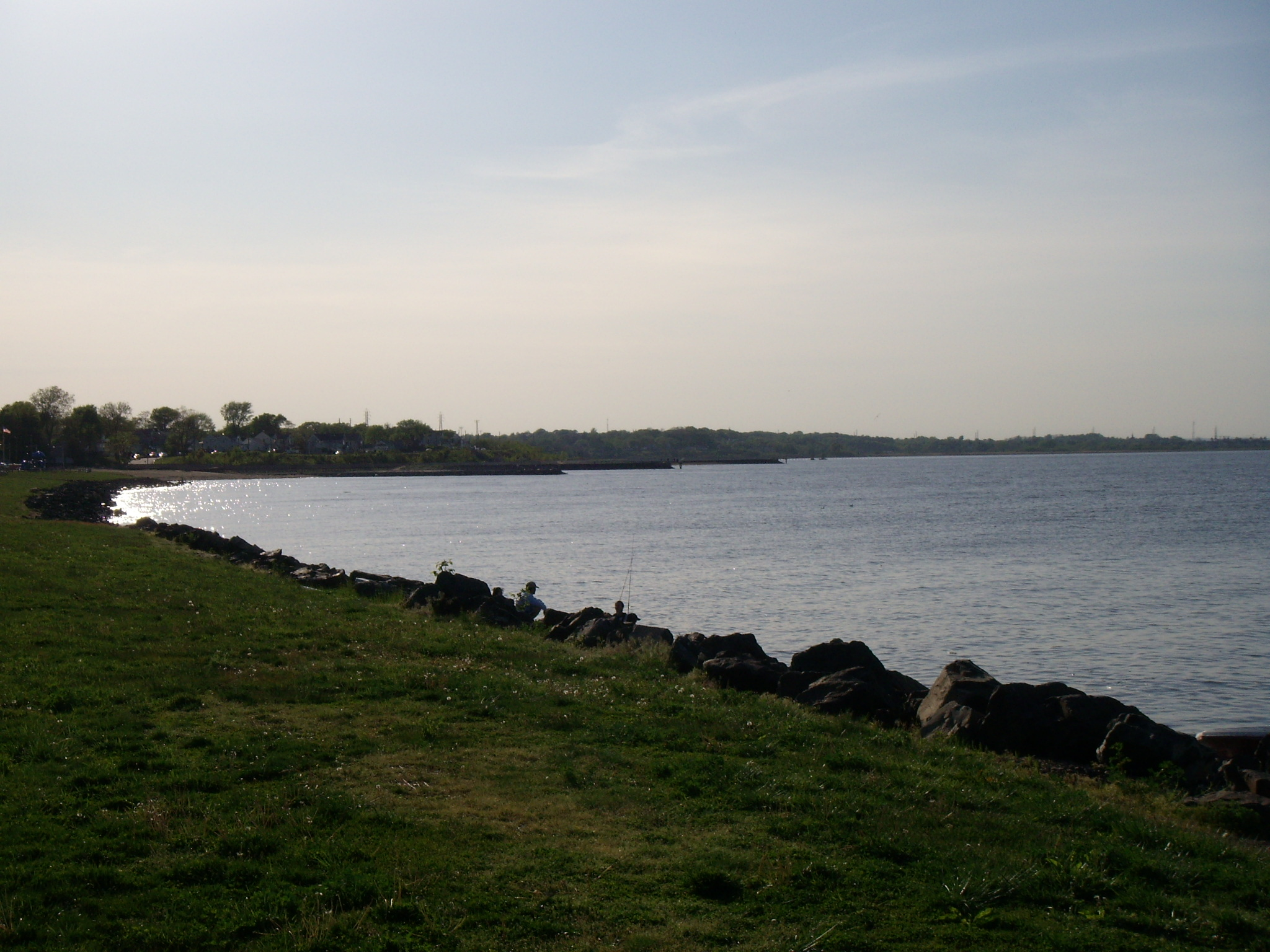
- The Raritan Bayshore at Laurence Harbor in Old Bridge, New Jersey, looking westward along Raritan Bay towards the adjacent Middlesex County city of South Amboy

- Map of Laurence Harbor CDP in Middlesex County. Inset: Location of Middlesex County in New Jersey.

- Location in Middlesex County Location in New Jersey Location in the United States
- Coordinates: 40.447787°N 74.248358°W
- Country: United States
- State: New Jersey
- County: Middlesex
- Township: Old Bridge

Area
  - Total: 3.00 sq mi (7.78 km^{2})
  - Land: 2.95 sq mi (7.64 km^{2})
  - Water: 0.054 sq mi (0.14 km^{2}) 1.90%
- Elevation: 30 ft (9 m)

Population (2020)
  - Total: 6,635
  - Density: 2,249.9/sq mi (868.7/km^{2})
- Time zone: UTC−05:00 (Eastern (EST))
  - Summer (DST): UTC−04:00 (Eastern (EDT))
- ZIP Codes: 08879 (Laurence Harbor); 07735 (Keyport); 07721 (Cliffwood)
- Area code: 732
- FIPS code: 34-39360
- GNIS feature ID: 02390040

Laurence Harbor is an unincorporated community and census-designated place (CDP) located along Raritan Bay within Old Bridge Township, Middlesex County, New Jersey, United States. As of the 2020 United States census, the CDP's population was 6,635, an increase of 99 (+1.5%) from the 6,536 recorded at the 2010 census, which in turn reflected an increase of 309 (+5.0%) from the 6,227 counted in the 2000 census.

== History ==
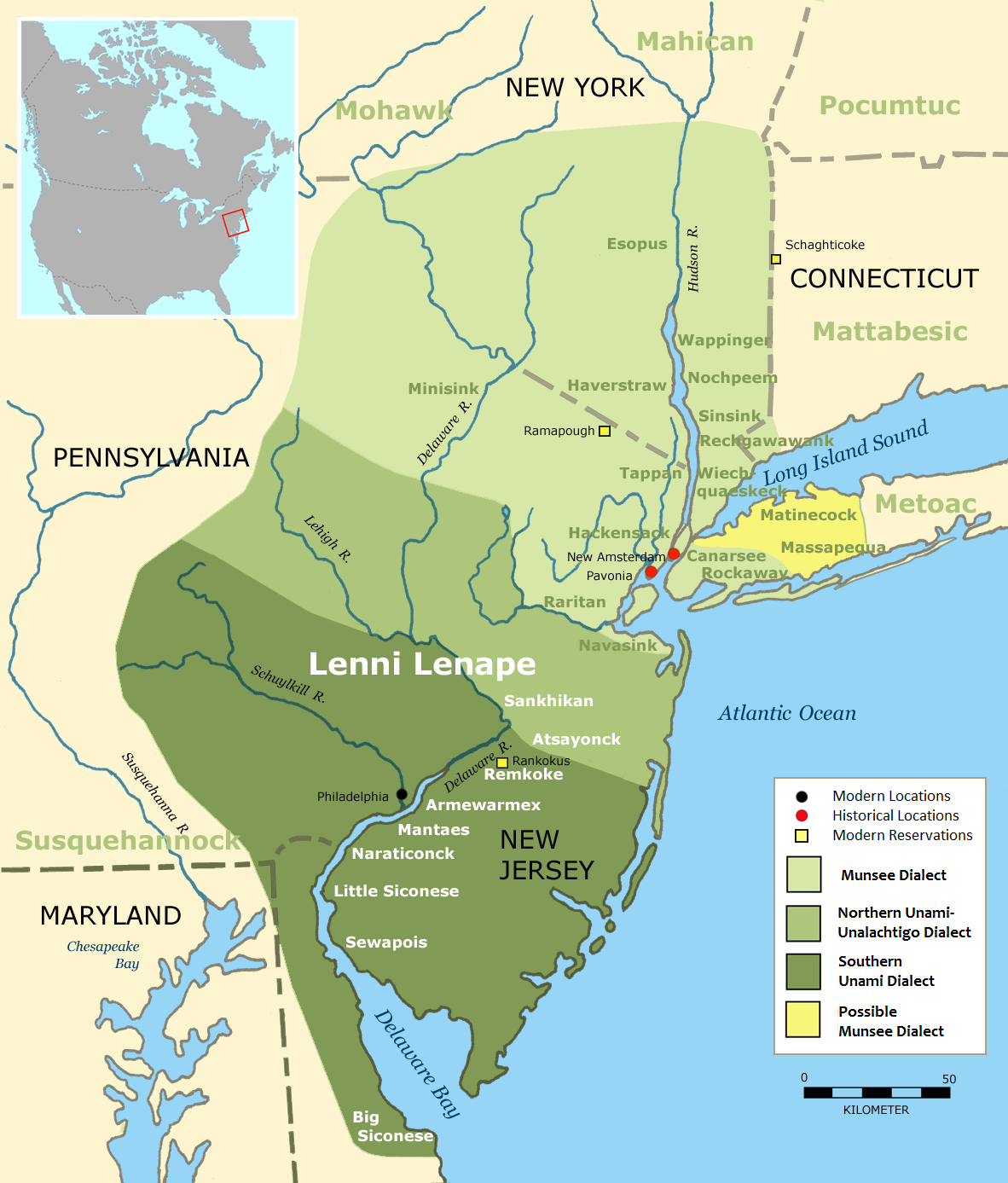
Lenape tribal zone

The lands known today as Laurence Harbor were part of the southernmost region inhabited by the Lenni Lenape tribe (also known as the Delaware) in the 17th century. In 1664, they became part of greater East Jersey, and in 1684 became part of South Amboy, which was much larger than it is today. In 1869, Madison Township split off from South Amboy; it was renamed Old Bridge Township in 1975.

European settlement of the area was linked to commerce passing through the Amboys along the Raritan River. From a military perspective, the area was useful for its high bayside cliffs, which allowed strategic observation of ships traveling between New York Harbor and the Atlantic Ocean.

Laurence Harbor is named after land developer Laurence Lamb, who bought property in what was then known as Madison Township at the turn of the 20th century and subdivided it into bungalow-sized lots. Lamb established a 400-acre (1.6 km^{2}) shorefront golf and country club on the site. Among those who frequented Mr. Lamb's establishment were Clark Gable, Guy Lombardo, the Prince of Wales and the Vanderbilts, who came to party and eat chingarora oysters, for which Raritan Bay was then famous. In 1928, the golf club was sold to developers for the above-mentioned construction of bungalows. A boardwalk, complete with a dance hall, casino, band shell, concession stands and a merry-go-round that played only one song, "Let's Remember Pearl Harbor", provided entertainment, hot dogs and ice cream during the 1940s.

For those traveling south from North Jersey or New York, it was the first stretch of Jersey Shore beachfront before reaching Keansburg or Asbury Park.

According to a local historian who grew up in Old Bridge Township, the area was used during Prohibition by rum runners who would lower their cargo of bootleg liquor overboard into the bay to be hauled ashore by local fishermen.

The Ochwald Brickworks, a brickyard, operated in the area where the Bridgepointe townhouses now stand. The brick plant began operation in the early 1900s and continued to the early 1960s. Its 60 workers produced more than 84,000 bricks per day. Nothing remains of the plant as all was demolished for residential dwellings.

== Geography ==
Laurence Harbor is the easternmost community in Middlesex County and occupies the northeast corner of Old Bridge Township. It is bordered to the north by Raritan Bay; to the northwest by Cheesequake Creek, across which is the neighborhood of Morgan within the borough of Sayreville; to the southwest by the Garden State Parkway; and to the southeast by the communities of Cliffwood and Cliffwood Beach in Monmouth County.

The CDP is located off Exit 120 of the Garden State Parkway. The main routes are Laurence Parkway and New Jersey Route 35. The railroad, which no longer has a station in Laurence Harbor (it had a Morgan station during most of the first half of the 20th century, located right across Cheesequake Creek from Laurence Harbor), divides the community into eastern and western sections, the former being locally referred to as "The Front".

According to the U.S. Census Bureau, the Laurence Harbor CDP has a total area of 3.00 square miles (7.8 km^{2}), including 2.95 square miles (7.6 km^{2}) of land and 0.06 square miles (0.16 km^{2}) of water (1.83%).

The community's shoreline looks directly north upon Staten Island's southern shore; the Verrazzano–Narrows Bridge, Lower Manhattan (including the Empire State Building, on a clear night) and Brooklyn can also be seen.

== Demographics ==
Historical population
Census	Pop.	Note	%±
1970	6,715		—
1980	6,737		0.3%
1990	6,361		−5.6%
2000	6,227		−2.1%
2010	6,536		5.0%
2020	6,635		1.5%
Population sources:1960–1980 1950 1960 1970; 1980 1990 2000; 2010 2020

Laurence Harbor first appeared as an unincorporated community in the 1970 U.S. census; and then was listed as a census designated place in the 1980 U.S. census.

=== Racial and ethnic composition ===
Laurence Harbor CDP, New Jersey – Racial and ethnic composition Note: the US Census treats Hispanic/Latino as an ethnic category. This table excludes Latinos from the racial categories and assigns them to a separate category. Hispanics/Latinos may be of any race.
Race / Ethnicity (NH = Non-Hispanic)	Pop 2000	Pop 2010	Pop 2020	% 2000	% 2010	% 2020
White alone (NH)	5,359	4,809	4,354	86.06%	73.58%	65.62%
Black or African American alone (NH)	197	359	468	3.16%	5.49%	7.05%
Native American or Alaska Native alone (NH)	13	13	13	0.21%	0.20%	0.20%
Asian alone (NH)	135	523	500	2.17%	8.00%	7.54%
Native Hawaiian or Pacific Islander alone (NH)	3	0	0	0.05%	0.00%	0.00%
Other race alone (NH)	19	23	39	0.31%	0.35%	0.59%
Mixed race or Multiracial (NH)	74	88	226	1.19%	1.35%	3.41%
Hispanic or Latino (any race)	427	721	1,035	6.86%	11.03%	15.60%
Total	6,227	6,536	6,635	100.00%	100.00%	100.00%

=== 2020 census ===
As of the 2020 census, Laurence Harbor had a population of 6,635. The median age was 42.5 years. 18.3% of residents were under the age of 18 and 15.1% of residents were 65 years of age or older. For every 100 females there were 100.5 males, and for every 100 females age 18 and over there were 98.2 males age 18 and over.

96.7% of residents lived in urban areas, while 3.3% lived in rural areas.

There were 2,625 households in Laurence Harbor, of which 26.2% had children under the age of 18 living in them. Of all households, 46.9% were married-couple households, 20.6% were households with a male householder and no spouse or partner present, and 24.2% were households with a female householder and no spouse or partner present. About 26.3% of all households were made up of individuals and 8.3% had someone living alone who was 65 years of age or older.

There were 2,749 housing units, of which 4.5% were vacant. The homeowner vacancy rate was 1.7% and the rental vacancy rate was 4.8%.

=== 2010 census ===
The 2010 United States census counted 6,536 people, 2,536 households, and 1,768 families in the CDP. The population density was 2,256.2 people per square mile (871.1 people/km^{2}). There were 2,650 housing units at an average density of 914.8 units per square mile (353.2 units/km^{2}). The racial makeup was 80.17% (5,240) White, 5.94% (388) Black or African American, 0.26% (17) Native American, 8.12% (531) Asian, 0.00% (0) Pacific Islander, 3.32% (217) from other races, and 2.19% (143) from two or more races. Hispanic or Latino of any race were 11.03% (721) of the population.

Of the 2,536 households, 28.4% had children under the age of 18; 51.6% were married couples living together; 11.7% had a female householder with no husband present and 30.3% were non-families. Of all households, 24.8% were made up of individuals and 5.5% had someone living alone who was 65 years of age or older. The average household size was 2.57 and the average family size was 3.09.

20.5% of the population were under the age of 18, 8.0% from 18 to 24, 30.8% from 25 to 44, 31.2% from 45 to 64, and 9.5% who were 65 years of age or older. The median age was 39.1 years. For every 100 females, the population had 101.4 males. For every 100 females ages 18 and older there were 99.8 males.

=== 2000 census ===
As of the 2000 United States census there were 6,227 people, 2,286 households, and 1,634 families residing in the CDP. The population density was 852.6 people/km^{2} (2,208 people/mi^{2}). There were 2,362 housing units at an average density of 323.4 units/km^{2} (838 units/mi^{2}). The racial makeup of the CDP was 90.65% White, 3.57% African American, 0.22% Native American, 2.20% Asian, 0.05% Pacific Islander, 1.64% from other races, and 1.67% from two or more races. Hispanic or Latino of any race were 6.86% of the population.

There were 2,286 households, out of which 34.4% had children under the age of 18 living with them, 55.6% were married couples living together, 11.5% had a female householder with no husband present, and 28.5% were non-families. 22.7% of all households were made up of individuals, and 4.9% had someone living alone who was 65 years of age or older. The average household size was 2.72 and the average family size was 3.25.

In the CDP the population was spread out, with 25.6% under the age of 18, 7.4% from 18 to 24, 34.9% from 25 to 44, 24.5% from 45 to 64, and 7.5% who were 65 years of age or older. The median age was 36 years. For every 100 females, there were 104.0 males. For every 100 females age 18 and over, there were 100.1 males.

The median income for a household in the CDP was $57,997, and the median income for a family was $61,470. Males had a median income of $46,439 versus $30,918 for females. The per capita income for the CDP was $23,619. About 4.3% of families and 5.6% of the population were below the poverty line, including 7.2% of those under age 18 and 10.8% of those age 65 or over.

== Housing ==
As this area was considered a beach resort back in the 1920s to 1950s, some houses along the waterfront and off Route 35 are bungalow style. Many have been updated to year-round use, and some lots have been combined to build much larger houses or additions. Built along the high waterfront cliffs, many of the houses have a waterfront view overlooking Raritan Bay, the Verrazzano–Narrows Bridge, Outerbridge Crossing and New York City (Lower Manhattan, Staten Island and Brooklyn) in the distance. The higher elevation protects most of the homes from flooding and provides the benefit of a shore view without flood insurance.

Bridgepointe, an upscale condo/townhouse development, was completed in 2005 and is located off Matawan Road very close to the Garden State Parkway Exit 120. This development, along with the Parkview at Madison Apartment complex, also nearby, serves the needs of many commuters who make the daily work trek to New York and North Jersey. A large cleared area of land located behind Bridgepointe and Parkview at Madison was slated for a high-end hotel, convention center, business complex, a New Jersey Transit train station and housing. Construction never began; however, the plans still remain on hold and are occasionally brought up within the township.

== Parks and recreation ==
Laurence Harbor is home to Old Bridge Waterfront Park, which consists of a new boardwalk (the old boardwalk was destroyed in the 1940–1950s) that was completed in 2002. The beachfront was redone through a joint venture by Old Bridge Township, New Jersey and Middlesex County Parks Department. It extends approximately one mile from the Old Bridge Police substation south, to the Aberdeen Township neighborhood of Cliffwood Beach, and runs parallel with New Jersey Route 35. This area is very popular for fishing as three jetties extend into Raritan Bay and are in excellent condition, also recently redone in the past ten years. The park's boardwalk is also popular for jogging and dog walking. At the northern parking lot of the park, there is bay beach swimming access along with a bathroom and showers.

On October 29, 2012, Hurricane Sandy slammed the greater Raritan Bayshore region. Its resulting storm surge, estimated to be in excess of 15 to 20 feet (4.6 to 6.1 m) above sea level, destroyed portions of the Old Bridge Waterfront Park.

Following Sandy, improvements to the boardwalk jetty and parks were performed in 2014 when the resources became available. There are now new parks and a new boardwalk and jetty railing, and improved erosion protection along the bay's edge.

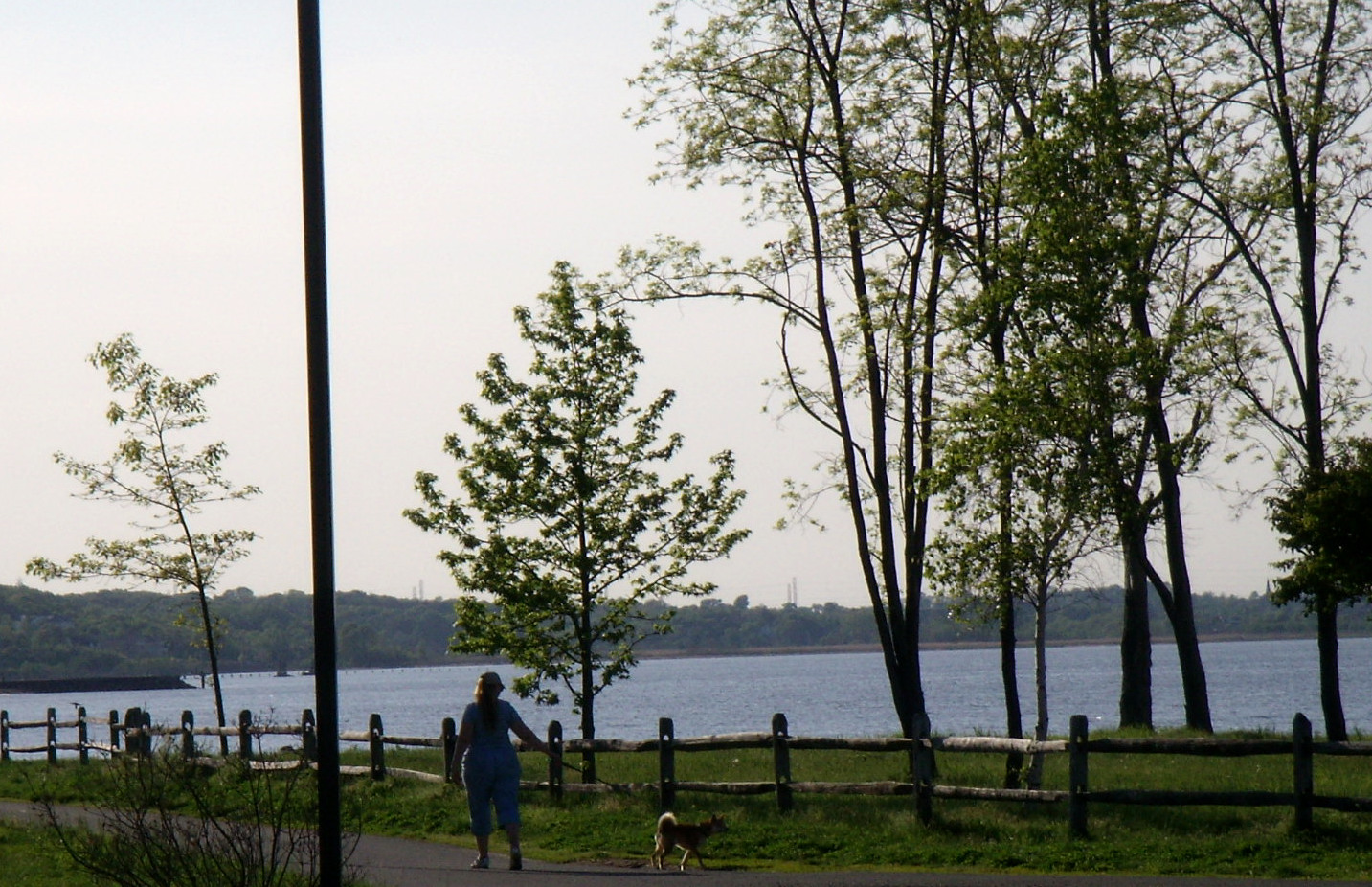
Woman walking her dog in Old Bridge Waterfront Park

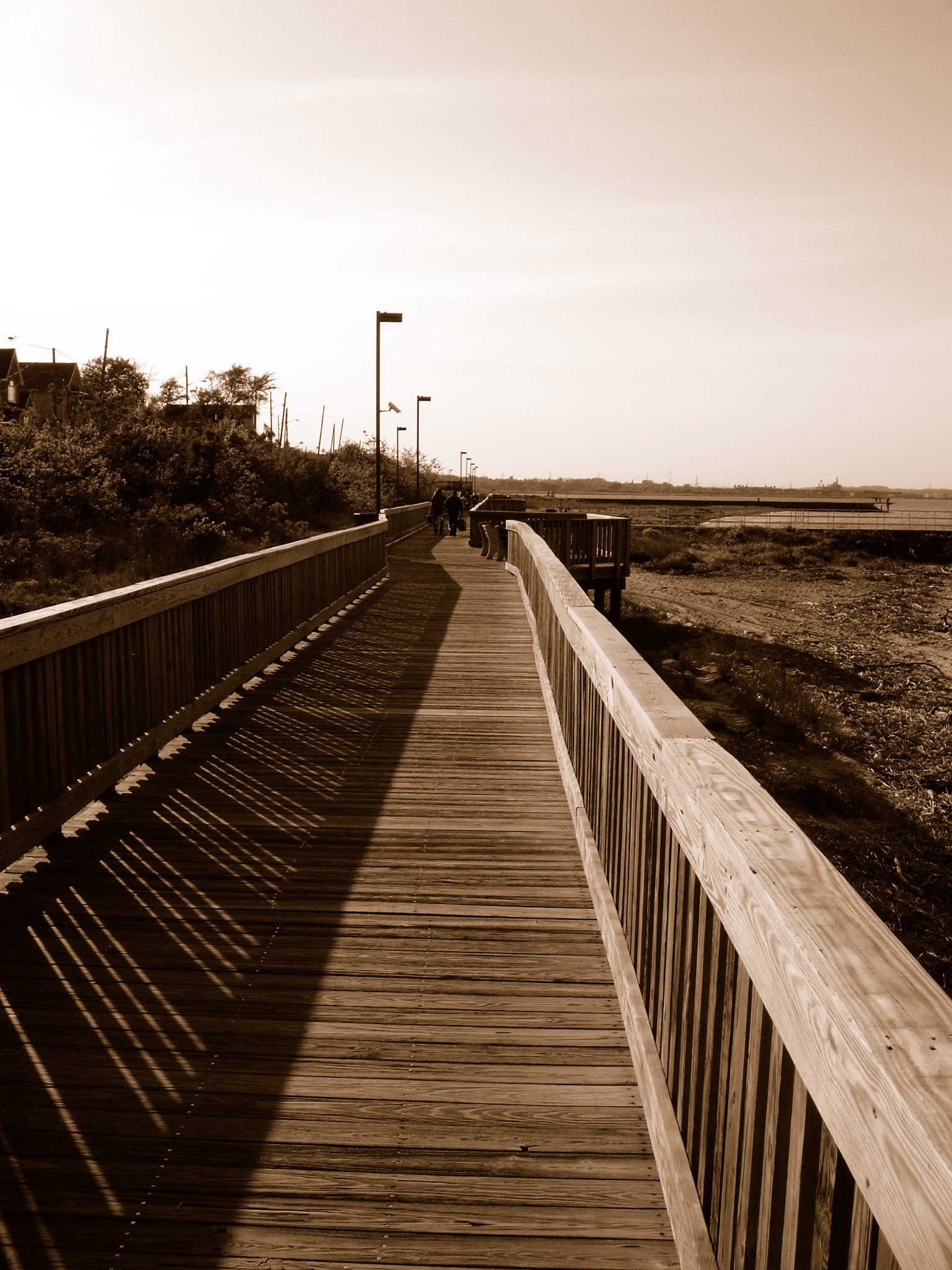
Boardwalk at Old Bridge Waterfront Park

== Environment ==
Laurence Harbor is surrounded by diverse wetlands and bay front. The shallow bay front provides habitat for migratory birds to stop and feed. Except for a few cold winter months, great egrets can be seen frequently in the area. In late September and October before freezing temperatures, the egrets can be found in large numbers. Large Atlantic horseshoe crabs can be seen in the hundreds spawning along the shoreline in April. During fall and early spring, sea gulls can be seen foraging for food by picking mussels and clams out of the bay, flying up, and dropping them on the local jetties to break them open and feed.

A diverse range of fish frequent and spawn in the local waters. Striped bass feed along the coastline in the early spring when the water temperature reaches approximately 45 degrees, begin to leave when the water gets warm enough for the bluefish, and return when the water cools in the fall. With birds at times following their feeding frenzies, bluefish feed heavily when they first arrive in spring. Various size bluefish remain in the water throughout the summer and into fall. Other fish that are known to be along the bay are black drum, fluke, winter flounder, eels, cow nose rays, skate, and weakfish.

Along the boardwalk amongst the sand dunes, there are honeysuckle trees that blossom in the spring. There have been sightings of wildlife such as the common box turtle along the boardwalk.

== Pollution and lead contamination ==
Pollution issues are being addressed on the southern half of the Old Bridge Waterfront Park. The main beach has been contaminated with toxic levels of lead. The Environmental Protection Agency has closed the beach to the public. There is information on the site at their web site under the National Priorities List for the Raritan Bay Slag Superfund Site. It is believed that slag from the National Lead factory in Sayreville was placed along the retaining wall in the 1960s and the 1970s to prevent erosion. Additionally, the same slag was used to build an entire jetty on the northern end of Morgan Bridge in Morgan. The slag comes in the form of about 20" diameter discs similar in shape to tire hubs and some are disc halves. The slag was a byproduct from the lead refining process that contains mostly steel with small percentages of lead and other heavy metals. The slag does not significantly affect the water quality due to dilution from ocean water that continuously comes in and out of the bay. Testing showed that the sand under the slag has lead particulates that have separated over time and there are traces of lead particulates in the sand below the tidal line. Once the slag is removed or contained the beach will be reopened.

Preceded by Northernmost beach	Beaches of New Jersey	Succeeded by Cliffwood Beach
