= North Jersey Coast Line =

Commuter rail line in New Jersey

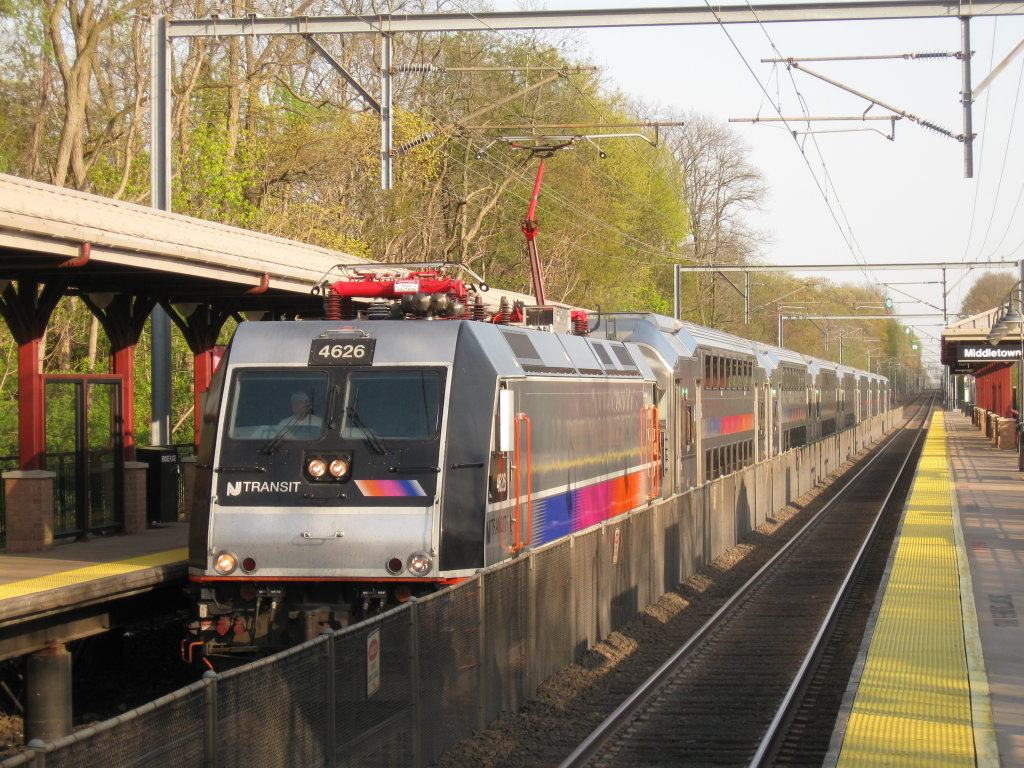
- An NJ Transit train arrives at Middletown station in Middletown Township

Overview
- Owner: NJ Transit Corporation
- Locale: Northern New Jersey, Central New Jersey, Jersey Shore
- Termini: Rahway; Long Branch Bay Head
- Stations: 20

Service
- Type: Commuter rail
- System: NJ Transit Rail Operations
- Operator: NJ Transit Rail Operations
- Rolling stock: ALP-45DP, ALP-46, GP40PH-2B or PL42AC locomotives Arrow III railcars Comet II IV & V or MultiLevel coaches
- Daily ridership: 15,300 (Q1, FY 2025)

Technical
- Track length: 81.5 mi (131.2 km)
- Track gauge: 4 ft 8 1/2 in (1,435 mm) standard gauge
- Electrification: Overhead line; 12 kV 25 Hz AC (New York–Matawan); 25 kV 60 Hz AC (Matawan–Long Branch)

The North Jersey Coast Line is a commuter rail line traversing through the Jersey Shore region, running from Rahway to Bay Head. Operated by NJ Transit, the line is electrified as far south as Long Branch. On rail system maps it is colored light blue, and its symbol is a sailboat. The line runs along the former New York & Long Branch Railroad, which was co-owned by the Central Railroad of New Jersey and the Pennsylvania Railroad.

Most trains operate between New York Penn Station and Long Branch, with frequent rush-hour service and hourly local off-peak service. Diesel shuttle trains between Long Branch and Bay Head meet these electric trains, although a limited number of through trains operate during weekday rush hours between Bay Head and New York Penn Station, utilizing dual-mode engines. Hourly New York to Long Branch service operates on weekends, with bi-hourly diesel shuttle service (with some extra trains) between Long Branch and Bay Head. Full hourly service operates during the peak summer season. Some electric trains terminate at South Amboy and make all stops from New York Penn Station, providing local service for the Northeast Corridor stops of Rahway, Linden, Elizabeth, and North Elizabeth during rush hours.

== Service ==
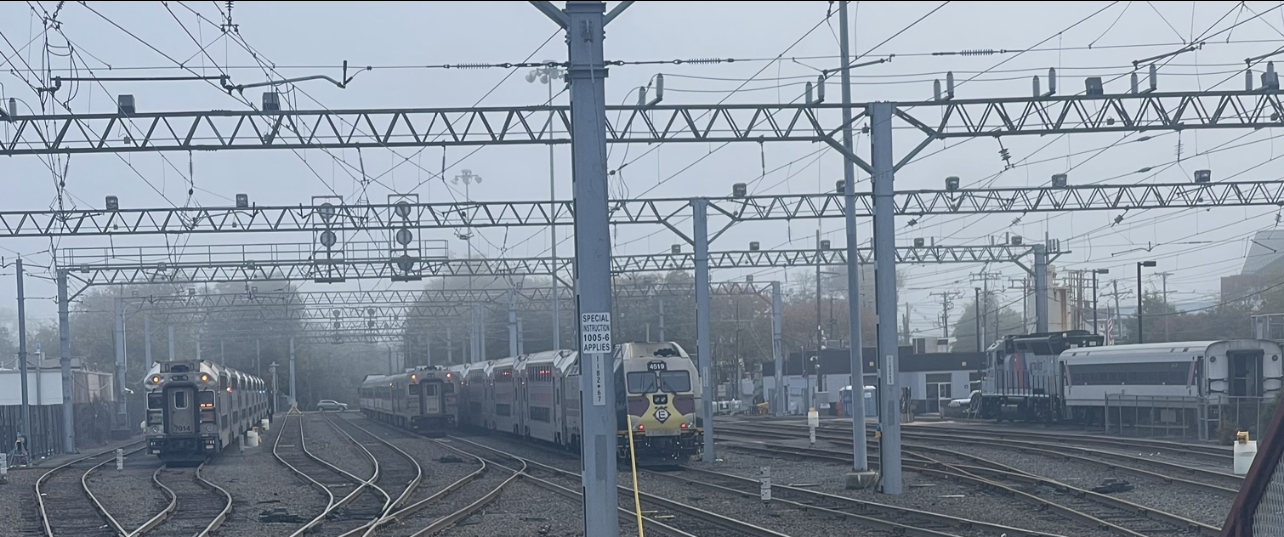
Long Branch Yard, one of the main yards on the North Jersey Coast Line

The line is double tracked, except for the bridge over the Manasquan River at Brielle. The line has cab signals and wayside block signals; the line from Rahway to Long Branch is signaled for operation in either direction on both tracks (Northeast Operating Rules Advisory Committee Rule 261). Twelve interlockings facilitate flexibility in operation between the two tracks; these and other interlockings control movements to or from freight lines such as the Chemical Coast Secondary, the Amboy Secondary, and the Southern Secondary, as well as Long Branch Yard.

NJ Transit trains in the Bay Head yard, the southern terminus of the line, September 2025

Passenger yards are at Long Branch and Bay Head. Long Branch Yard is fully electrified, and mostly interlocked. Bay Head contains a large balloon (circular looping) track where entire trains can reverse direction without backing up or uncoupling the locomotive, and obviating the need for a turntable. It remains in service, even though push-pull operation has eliminated the need for turning of trains. Bay Head Yard has no interlocking; all switches are hand-operated. A yard and sidings formerly existed at South Amboy, dating to when electrification ended there, but have since been removed; trains terminating at South Amboy cannot be bypassed by using the other track, as the new station has a single island platform.

Conrail Shared Assets Operations also operates over the North Jersey Coast Line to interchange with the Delaware and Raritan River Railroad in Red Bank.

=== Movable bridges ===
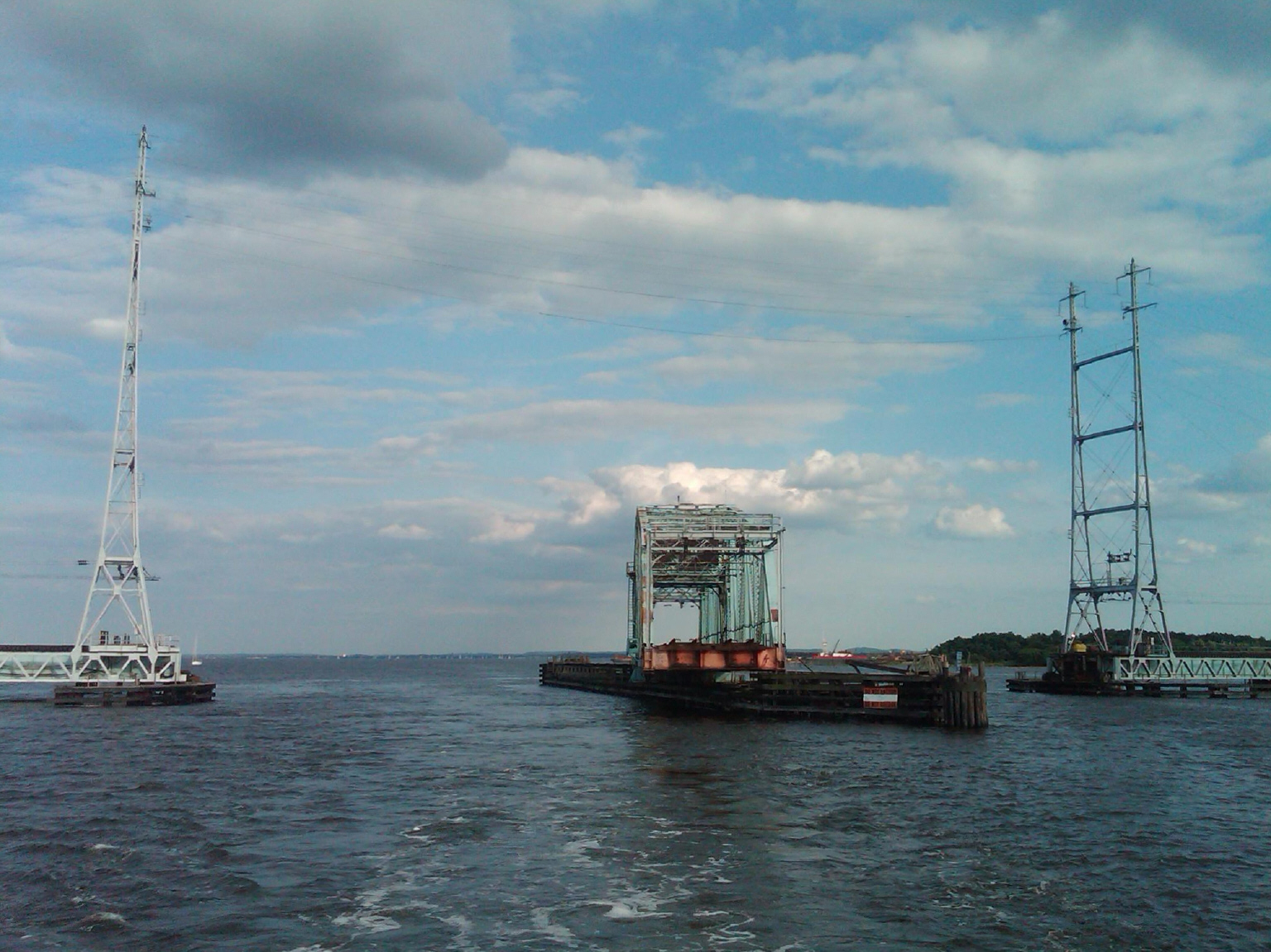
Raritan Bay Drawbridge, one of the moveable bridges on the New Jersey Coast Line

The North Jersey Coast Line has five movable bridges of the twelve used by the NJT rail network, the most on any one line.

- River Draw (swing) at Raritan Bay
- Morgan Draw (bascule) spans cross the Cheesequake or Morgan Creek
- Oceanport Draw (swing, with non-movable catenary) over the Shrewsbury River
- the Shark River Draw (bascule) on Shark River
- Brielle Draw over the Manasquan River

All these bridges were originally double-track spans, but Brielle Draw has been single-tracked since the mid-1970s. The line also crosses over several other waterways on fixed bridges, the longest of which is over the Navesink River at Red Bank.

=== Electrification ===
The North Jersey Coast Line is electrified north of Long Branch.

Electrified operation between Rahway and South Amboy began about 1936. Electrification was extended to Matawan in 1982 (now called Aberdeen-Matawan), with catenary installed in the early 1980s. This was originally 11 kV, increased to 12 kV in 1978 along with Amtrak's New York-Washington electrification, with insulators capable of supporting 25 kV. Electrification at 12.5 kV 60 Hz was extended to Long Branch in 1988, with catenary installed in 1986–88. As on the 1982 extension, the insulators can handle 25 kV. The catenary is self-adjusting (constant tensioning) with ambient temperature. In 2002, the voltage from Matawan to Long Branch was changed from 12.5 kV to 25 kV. As a result, the Arrow III passenger cars can no longer run between those two points, since those trains can not run on two different voltages on one trip (the transformer voltage taps must be manually changed from alongside the MU).

The line remains electrified at 12 kV 25 Hz AC north of Matawan. Three phase breaks segregate the different power sources, at the Matawan Phase Gap, Laurel Phase Gap (Hazlet/Holmdel), and east of Bergen Place in Red Bank.

== History ==
With the completion of the Waterfront Connection in 1991, five weekday round trip diesel trains began running from Bay Head to Hoboken Terminal using the Waterfront Connection. On May 18, 2015, NJ Transit expanded service to include three inbound and three outbound weekday trains running from Bay Head directly to and from New York Penn Station. The line was renamed to the "Bleachers Coast Line" temporarily in August 2026 as a partnership with New Jersey's rock band, "Bleachers".

=== Commuter clubs ===
The line was home to the second-last remaining private commuter passenger club in the United States. (Car 553 on the Metra Union Pacific North Line was the last.) The Jersey Shore Commuters Club was established in 1933 under the auspices of the Pennsylvania Railroad. It used half of a Comet IIM car - car 5459 (built as Comet IIB 5759 in 1988). In 2004, the Comet II Club Car went through a custom overhaul by Alstom and was furnished, with the club's funding, to include reclining lounge chairs, spacious seating, at-seat fold down tables, and private conference tables. The club also hosted various onboard activities to preserve its heritage. Club members enjoyed guaranteed and spacious seating as part of their annual membership fee that the club remitted to NJ Transit as part of its lease agreement. Membership was "open" and on a "first come first served basis" to those willing to pay the membership fee and abide by the club's bylaws. The Club end of the car was furnished similar to Amtrak's Amfleet and Horizon fleet of cars. The Club Car seats were actually former Amfleet Metroliner seats that the club had re-conditioned. The Club Car only ran during peak rush hour periods with one weekday round trip per day and was always run with the club end coupled to the locomotive when used. Due to damage sustained to the Club Car in Hurricane Sandy, the commuter club was disbanded in August 2013. Per posts on the club's Facebook page, the Club Car took its last trip on the line in October 2012, just prior to the hurricane.

=== Bergen Shore Express ===
In the summers of 1986–1988, NJ Transit experimented with service from selected stops of the Bergen County Line, around the southwest curve of the West End Junction in Jersey City, and switching from the Morris & Essex to the Northeast Corridor via a complicated set of switch maneuvers in the Newark area, then continuing express to the Coast Line, with no intermediate stops between Harmon Cove station and Long Branch. Tickets were for a specified town and included bus service to the beach and beach admission passes. One round trip was made each Saturday and Sunday during July. Despite high demand (on sunny days), the service was discontinued, ostensibly due to crew and equipment shortages, and the inability to forecast demand.

=== Summer Shore Express ===
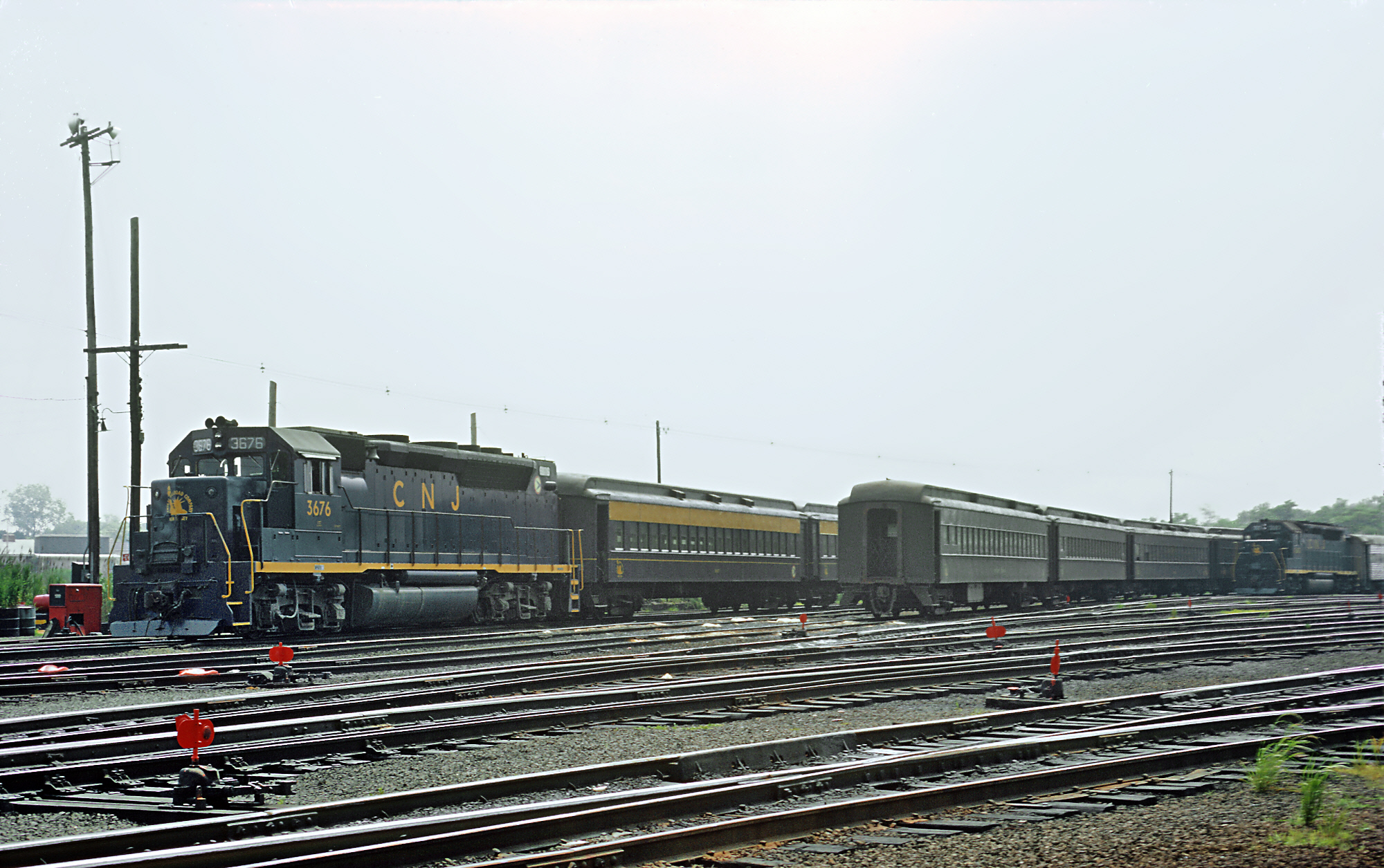
A Central Railroad of New Jersey commuter train at Bay Head station in 1971

In June 2014, NJ Transit began running one-seat limited-stop summer shore express trains to and from Bay Head and New York Penn Station on weekends and holidays. This limited time service only ran through the summer and ended on September 1, 2014. This service was brought back for the 2015, 2016, and 2017 summer seasons. Service consisted of four inbound and outbound trips, with two trips during the morning, and two in the evening in both directions.

=== Hurricane Sandy ===
As a line paralleling the New Jersey coastline, the North Jersey Coast Line received exceptionally severe damage from Hurricane Sandy on October 29–30, 2012. Track was washed out in several places from Perth Amboy southward, most notably between South Amboy and Aberdeen-Matawan stations, where the line runs closest to the Atlantic Ocean. The Raritan Bay and Morgan Creek drawbridges were struck by boats, storage containers and other floating debris, knocking the bridges' tracks out of alignment. Trees also fell over parts of the line. Service remained suspended for three weeks; a resumption of service only as far as Woodbridge (and skipping Avenel) on November 4 was halted after only one day due to severe overcrowding. The Christie administration announced that most North Jersey Coast Line trains would return to service on Monday, November 19, with slightly longer trip times and omission of trains to Hoboken Terminal.

== Rolling stock ==
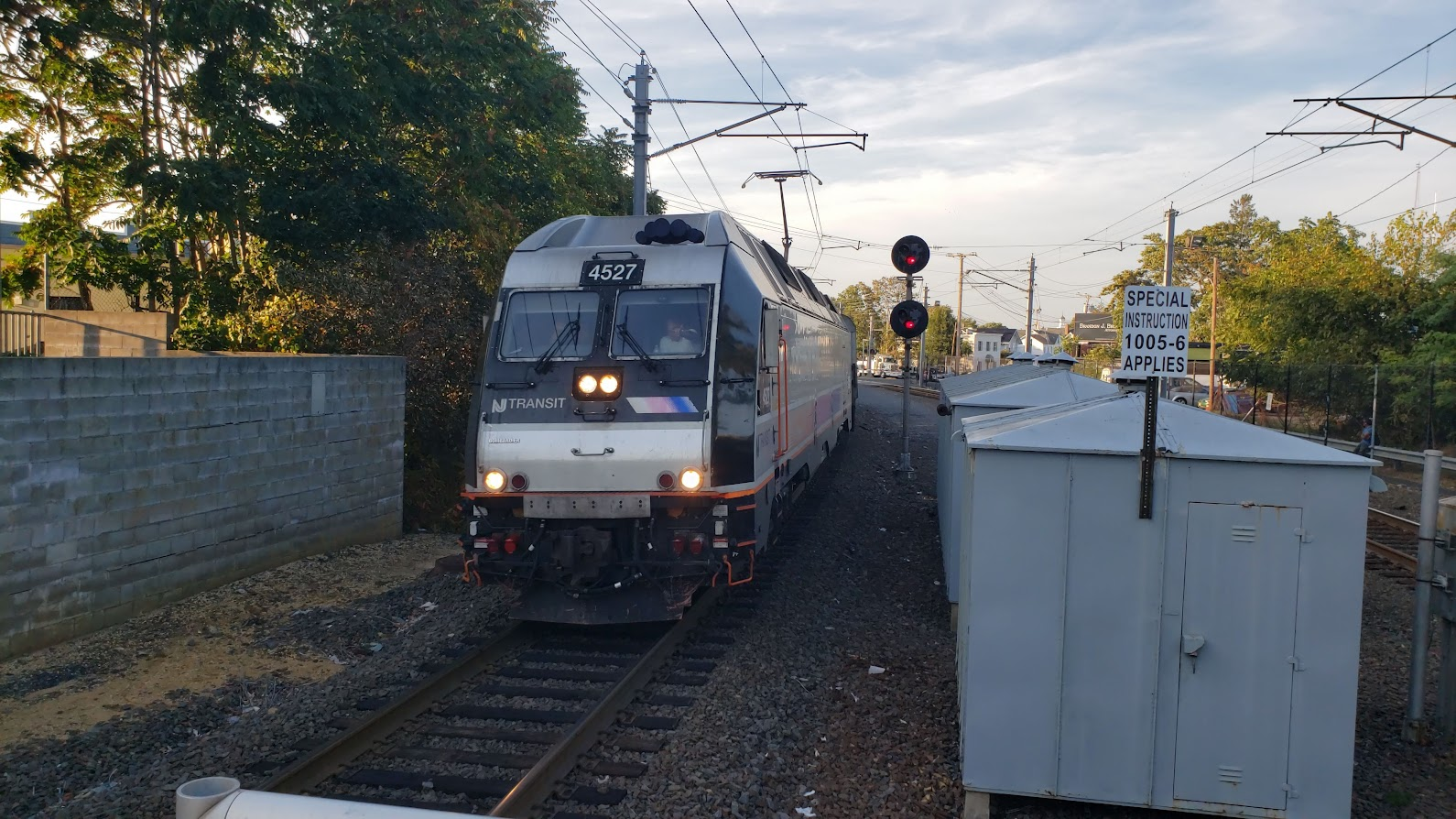
ALP-45 4527 entering Long Branch station

Because of the complexity of electrification on the Coast Line, the route has among the most diverse fleet in the NJT system.

Between New York and Long Branch service is typically operated with an ALP-46 electric locomotive pulling Comet II & IV cars with a Comet V cab car or MultiLevel coaches. Shuttle trains between Long Branch and Bay Head are typically operated with a PL42AC or GP40PH-2B diesel locomotive or Bombardier ALP-45DP locomotives pulling 4 to 6 car sets of Comet II & IV cars with a Comet V cab car or MultiLevel coaches.

During weekday rush hours, NJ Transit operates "One Seat Ride" services between New York and Bay Head. These trains use ALP-45DP dual-power locomotives that can run on either electric power supplied by overhead lines or from an on-board diesel generator. They are paired with an 8-car set of Comet II & IV cars with a Comet V cab car or MultiLevel coaches.

NJ Transit also operates short turn runs between New York and South Amboy during weekday rush hours. These services can use Arrow III railcars. Because of the voltage change at Matawan, Arrow railcars cannot operate further south, as they are not capable of in motion voltage changes like the ALP-45 and ALP-46 locomotives.

== Stations ==
State	Zone	Location	Station	Miles (km)	Date opened	Date closed	Connections / notes
NY	1	Manhattan	New York Penn Station	0.0 (0.0)	1910		Amtrak (long distance): Cardinal, Crescent, Lake Shore Limited, Palmetto, Silver Meteor; Amtrak (intercity): Acela Express, Adirondack, Carolinian, Empire Service, Ethan Allen Express, Keystone Service, Maple Leaf, Northeast Regional, Pennsylvanian, Vermonter; Long Island Rail Road: Babylon, Belmont Park, City Terminal Zone, Far Rockaway, Hempstead, Long Beach, Montauk, Oyster Bay, Port Jefferson, Port Washington, Ronkonkoma, West Hempstead branches NJ Transit: Gladstone, Montclair-Boonton, Morristown, Raritan Valley, Northeast Corridor lines New York City Subway: 1, 2, and 3 (at 34th Street–Penn Station (IRT Broadway–Seventh Avenue Line)), A, C, and E (at 34th Street–Penn Station (IND Eighth Avenue Line)); New York City Bus: M7, M20, M34 SBS, M34A, Q32; Academy Bus: SIM23, SIM24; Flixbus: Eastern Shuttle; Vamoose Bus
NJ	1	Secaucus	Secaucus Junction	3.5 (5.6)	2003		NJ Transit: Bergen County, Gladstone, Main, BetMGM Meadowlands, Montclair-Boonton, Morristown, Pascack Valley, Raritan Valley, and Northeast Corridor lines Metro-North Railroad: Port Jervis Line; NJ Transit Bus: 2, 78, 129, 329, 353
NJ	1	Newark	Newark Penn Station	10.0 (16.1)	March 24, 1935		Amtrak (long-distance): Cardinal, Crescent, Palmetto, Silver Meteor, Silver Star; Amtrak (intercity): Acela Express, Carolinian, Keystone Service, Northeast Regional, Pennsylvanian, Vermonter; NJ Transit: Northeast Corridor and Raritan Valley lines PATH: Newark – World Trade Center; Newark Light Rail: Grove Street – Newark Penn, Broad Street – Newark Penn; NJ Transit Bus: 1, 5, 11, 21, 25, 28, 29, 30, 31, 34, 39, 40, 41, 44, 62, 67, 70, 71, 72, 73, 76, 78, 79, 108, 308, 319, 361, 375, 378, go25, go28 Greyhound Lines
NJ	1	Newark	South Street				
NJ	1	Newark	Newark Liberty International Airport Station	12.6 (20.3)	October 21, 2001		Amtrak: Keystone Service, Northeast Regional; NJ Transit: Northeast Corridor Line; AirTrain Newark
NJ	5	Elizabeth	North Elizabeth	14.4 (23.2)			NJ Transit: Northeast Corridor Line; NJ Transit Bus: 112
NJ	5	Elizabeth	Elizabeth	15.4 (24.8)	December 21, 1835		NJ Transit: Northeast Corridor Line; NJ Transit Bus: 24, 26, 48, 52, 56, 57, 58, 59, 62, 112
NJ	5	Elizabeth	South Elizabeth				
NJ	7	Linden	Linden	18.6 (29.9)			NJ Transit: Northeast Corridor Line; NJ Transit Bus: 56, 57, 94
NJ	8	Rahway					
NJ	8	Rahway	North Rahway	20.1 (32.3)		January 31, 1993	Closed due to maintenance issues
NJ	8	Rahway	Rahway	20.7 (33.3)	January 1, 1836		NJ Transit: Northeast Corridor Line; NJ Transit Bus: 48; Rahway Community Shuttle
NJ	9	Woodbridge Township	Avenel	23.0			
NJ	9	Woodbridge Township	Edgars			July 21, 1975	
NJ	10	Woodbridge Township	Woodbridge	25.3	October 11, 1864		NJ Transit Bus: 48, 116, 803
NJ	10	Woodbridge Township	Genasco				
NJ	12	Perth Amboy	Perth Amboy	29.6	June 28, 1875		NJ Transit Bus: 48, 116, 813, 815, 817
NJ	13	South Amboy	South Amboy	33.6	1938		NJ Transit Bus: 815, 817
NJ	13	Old Bridge Township	Laurence Harbor	36.9			Formerly proposed station in 1985, 2001, and 2008
NJ	15	Matawan	Aberdeen–Matawan	40.6	July 1, 1875		NJ Transit Bus: 135
NJ	16	Hazlet	Hazlet	45.2	July 1, 1875		Academy Bus: PNC Bank Arts Center Shuttle
NJ	17	Middletown Township	Middletown	48.6	July 1, 1875		
NJ	18	Red Bank	Red Bank	55.2	July 1, 1875		NJ Transit Bus: 831, 832, 834, 838; Academy Bus: Shore Points Line
NJ	19	Little Silver	Little Silver	56.9	July 1, 1875		Academy Bus: Shore Points Line
NJ	19	Oceanport	Monmouth Park (limited service)	59.1	1892		
NJ	20	Long Branch	Long Branch	61.3	July 1, 1875		NJ Transit Bus: 831, 837; Academy Bus: 36 Terminus of electrification
NJ	20	Elberon	Elberon	64.3	August 25, 1875		
NJ	21	Allenhurst	Allenhurst	67.0	May 17, 1897		NJ Transit Bus: 837
NJ	21	Interlaken	Interlaken	67.8		July 30, 1904	
NJ	21	Asbury Park					
NJ	21	Asbury Park	North Asbury Park	68.7		July 21, 1975	
NJ	21	Asbury Park	Asbury Park	69.5	August 25, 1875		NJ Transit Bus: 317, 830, 832, 836, 837; Academy Bus: Shore Points Line
NJ	21	Bradley Beach	Bradley Beach	70.5	June 24, 1893		NJ Transit Bus: 317, 830; Academy Bus: Shore Points Line
NJ	22						
NJ	22	Avon-by-the-Sea	Avon	71.1		April 1982	
NJ	22	Belmar	Belmar	71.7	September 14, 1875		NJ Transit Bus: 317, 830; Academy Bus: Shore Points Line
NJ	22	Lake Como	Como			June 1934	Demolished by New York & Long Branch Railroad in November 1934.
NJ	22	Spring Lake	Spring Lake	74.2	October 11, 1875		NJ Transit Bus: 317, 830; Academy Bus: Shore Points Line
NJ	23						
NJ	23	Sea Girt	Sea Girt	76.0	October 11, 1875	July 21, 1975	
NJ	23	Manasquan	Manasquan	77.3	July 29, 1880		NJ Transit Bus: 317, 830; Academy Bus: Shore Points Line
NJ	23	Point Pleasant Beach	Point Pleasant Beach	80.0	July 29, 1880		NJ Transit Bus: 317, 830; Academy Bus: Shore Points Line
NJ	23	Bay Head	Bay Head	81.5	August 1, 1882		

== See also ==
- New York and Long Branch Railroad
- Perth Amboy and Woodbridge Railroad
- Union Tower
- Essay Tower

== Bibliography ==
- Honeyman, Abraham Van Doren (1923). History of Union County, New Jersey 1664-1923 · Volume 1. New York, New York: Lewis Historical Publishing Company.
- Poor, Henry Varnum (1893). Poor's Manual of Railroads, Volume 26. New York, New York: American Bank Note Company.
- Shea, Raymond F. (2009). Brielle: From Saltworks to Suburb. Mount Pleasant, South Carolina: Arcadia Publishing. ISBN 9781614235255.
- United States Congress (1884). The Executive Documents of the House of Representatives for the First Session of the Forty-Eighth Congress, 1883-'84. Washington D.C.: Government Printing Office.
- Wainwright, Halsted H. (1922). History of Monmouth County, New Jersey, 1664-1920 Volume 2. New York, New York: The Lewis Historical Publishing Company.
