= Shark River Draw =

Bridge in New Jersey, U.S.

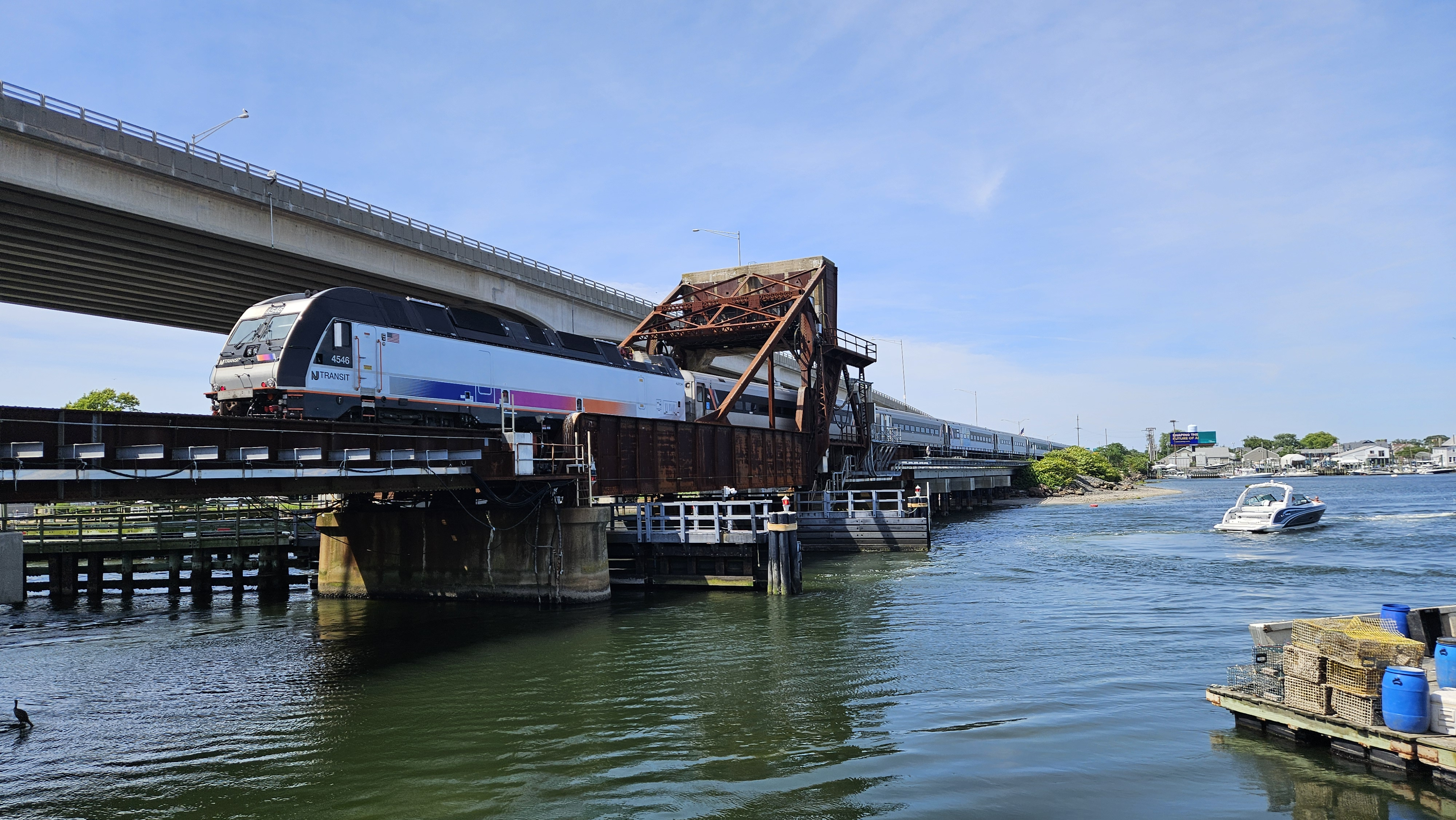
- A Bombardier ALP-45A Crosses the Shark River Draw
- Coordinates: 40°11′05″N 74°01′33″W
- Carries: New York and Long Branch (up until 1976); Ocean Avenue
- Crosses: Shark River Inlet
- Owner: New Jersey Transit
- ID number: NJT 433

Characteristics
- Design: Bascule Bridge

History
- Construction end: 1937

Location
- Interactive map of Shark River Draw

The Shark River Draw, commonly known as the Belmar Bridge, is a moveable drawbridge that over the Shark River Inlet, an inlet at the mouth of the Shark River in the towns of Belmar and Avon-by-the-Sea Monmouth County, New Jersey, United States, just west of the Atlantic Ocean.

The bascule bridge carries NJ Transit Rail Operations North Jersey Coast Line between the Bradley Beach and Belmar stations. The bridge was built in 1937 by the New York and Long Branch Railroad. It underwent a major 5-stage rehabilitation in 2013–2014.

The drawbridge runs parallel and downstream to the fixed crossing of the New Jersey Route 35 and upstream of the moveable crossing of New Jersey Route 71 bridge to the east, together with which it is subject to the opening regulations as set out in Title 33 of the Code of Federal Regulations.

== See also ==
- NJT movable bridges
- List of crossings of the Raritan River
