= Oceanport Draw =

- Coordinates: 40.31830°N 74.02527°W
- Carries: North Jersey Coast Line
- Crosses: Oceanport Creek
- Locale: Oceanport, New Jersey
- Owner: NJ Transit
- Bridge Hunter ID: NJT; BH 61743

Characteristics
- Design: Swing
- Traversable?: Yes; by train only
- Clearance below: 4 ft (1.2 m) mean high water 6 ft (1.8 m) mean low water

Rail characteristics
- No. of tracks: 2
- Electrified: 25 kV 60 Hz

History
- Construction end: 1914

Oceanport Draw is railroad moveable bridge over the Oceanport Creek (MP 8.4), a tributary of the Shrewsbury River, in Oceanport in Monmouth County, New Jersey, United States. It is owned and operated by New Jersey Transit Rail Operations (NJT).

== History ==
The bridge was built in 1914 and was used by New York and Long Branch Railroad, which was jointly owned and operated by the Pennsylvania Railroad (PRR) and the Central Railroad of New Jersey (CNJ). It became property of Conrail in 1976. It is identified as the Oceanport Creek Bridge (ID#2041) by the New Jersey's state historic preservation office (SHPO; April 4, 1984).

== Operations ==
The swing bridge serves the North Jersey Coast Line (MP 19.80) between the Little Silver and Monmouth Park stations. As of 2008 the Code of Federal Regulations stipulated that it open on signal with exceptions: four hours notice is required from January 1 through March 31 from 6 p.m. to 6 a.m.; from April 1 through April 30 and November 1 through November 30 (from 10 p.m. to 6 a.m. Monday through Thursday, and midnight Sunday through 6 a.m. Monday; and from December 1 through December 31 from 10 p.m. to 6 a.m.

== See also ==
- NJT movable bridges
- List of crossings of the Raritan River
