= South Amboy station =

NJ Transit rail station

South Amboy
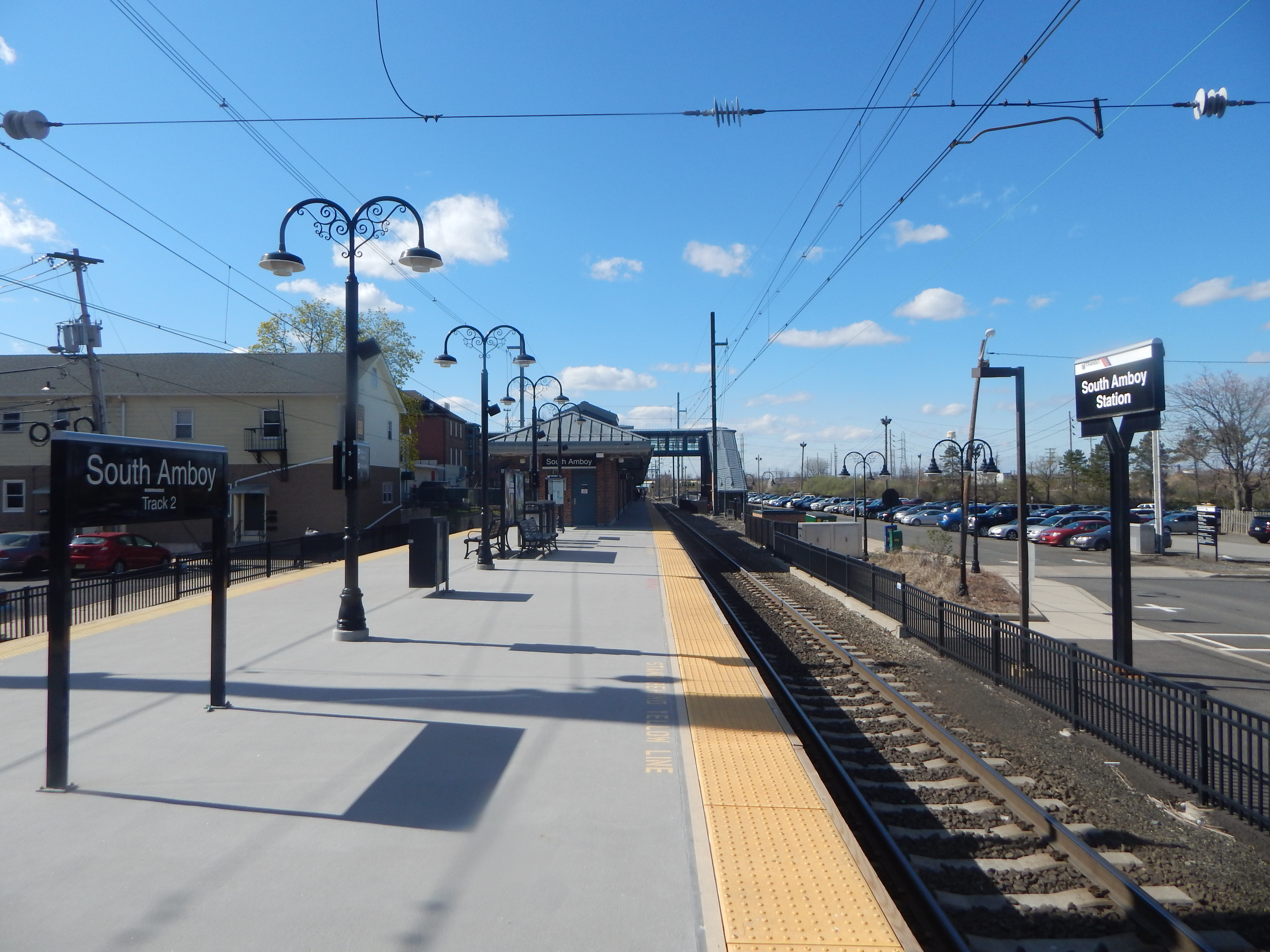
- South Amboy station in April 2015.

General information
- Location: 137 North Broadway; South Amboy, New Jersey 08879
- Coordinates: 40°28′58.57″N 74°16′44.16″W
- Owner: New Jersey Transit
- Platforms: 1 island platform
- Tracks: 2
- Connections: NJT Bus: 815 and 817

Construction
- Parking: Yes
- Cycle facilities: Yes
- Accessible: yes

Other information
- Fare zone: 13

History
- Rebuilt: November 2006–January 5, 2010
- Electrified: 12 kV 25 Hz

Passengers
- 2025: 675 (average weekday)
- Rank: 41 of 153

Services
Preceding station	NJ Transit	Following station
Aberdeen–Matawan toward Bay Head	North Jersey Coast Line	Perth Amboy toward New York
Former services
Preceding station	New York and Long Branch Railroad	Following station
Morgan toward Bay Head Junction	Main Line	South Amboy Junction toward Perth Amboy
Preceding station	Pennsylvania Railroad	Following station
Old Bridge toward Camden	Amboy Branch	Terminus
Location

South Amboy is a commuter railroad train station in the city of South Amboy, Middlesex County, New Jersey. Servicing trains of New Jersey Transit's North Jersey Coast Line, electric trains go between New York Penn Station and Long Branch. There are also diesel trains that go through to Bay Head. The next station to the north, across the Raritan River, is Perth Amboy and the next station to the southeast is Aberdeen–Matawan. The station consists of two tracks and a single high-level island platform that is handicap accessible.

== History ==
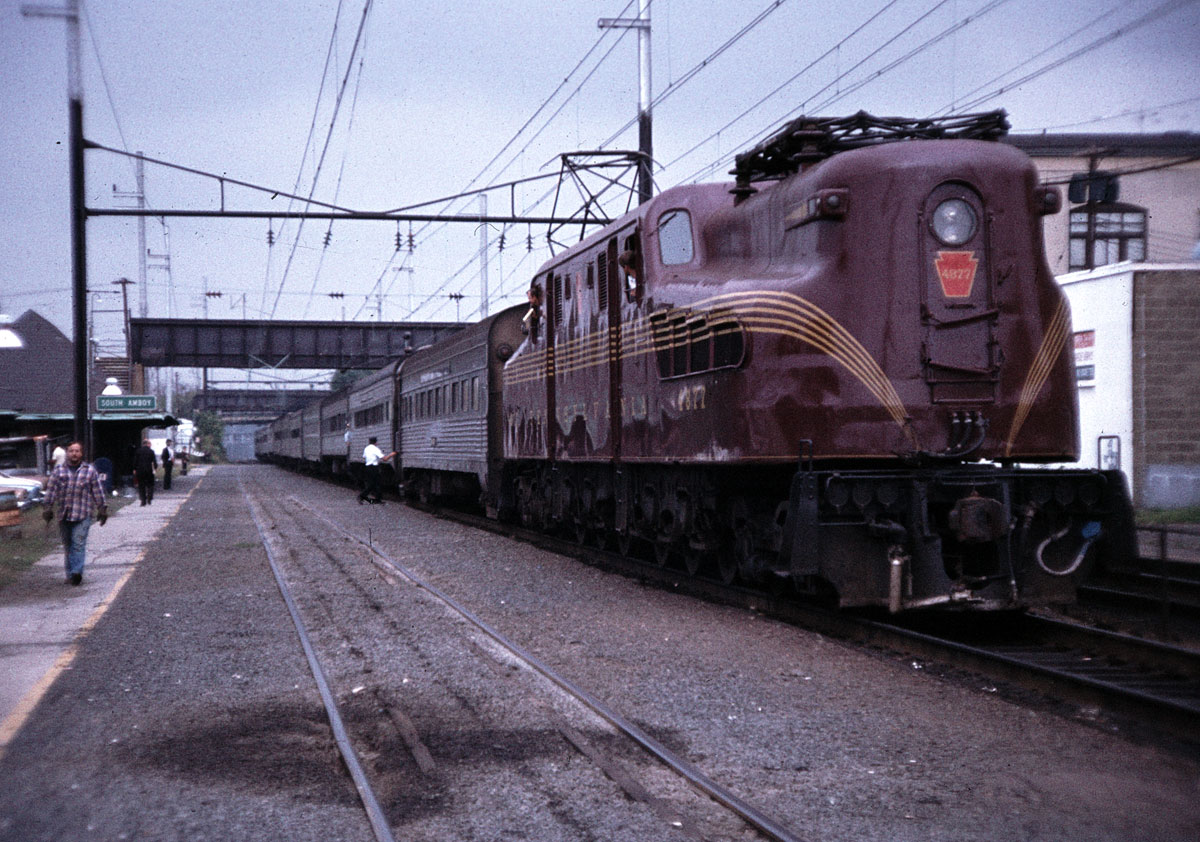
South Amboy station in 1981, with a Pennsylvania Railroad GG1 locomotive present in the station.

South Amboy station was upgraded to be fully compliant with the Americans with Disabilities Act of 1990 as part of a station renovation project from November 2006 to January 5, 2010. During the first phase of the project, a new $4.8 million pedestrian overpass was constructed, allowing safe transfers across the two tracks at the station. The overpass opened on March 11, 2005. The second phase of the project replaced the two original low-level side platforms with a new ADA-accessible high-level island platform, and reconstructed the station building. The station received a new ticket office, canopies, signage, and lighting. The second phase cost $29 million, and was completed on January 5, 2010.

In 2014, a September 11 memorial and plaque was installed on the west side of the station at the plaza facing North Broadway. It features a section of antenna steel donated by the Port Authority of New York and New Jersey from one of the World Trade Center towers.

== Station layout ==
This station has two tracks and a high-level island platform, and is fully ADA-accessible. The station had a third track, but it was removed during the station renovation project.

== Images ==
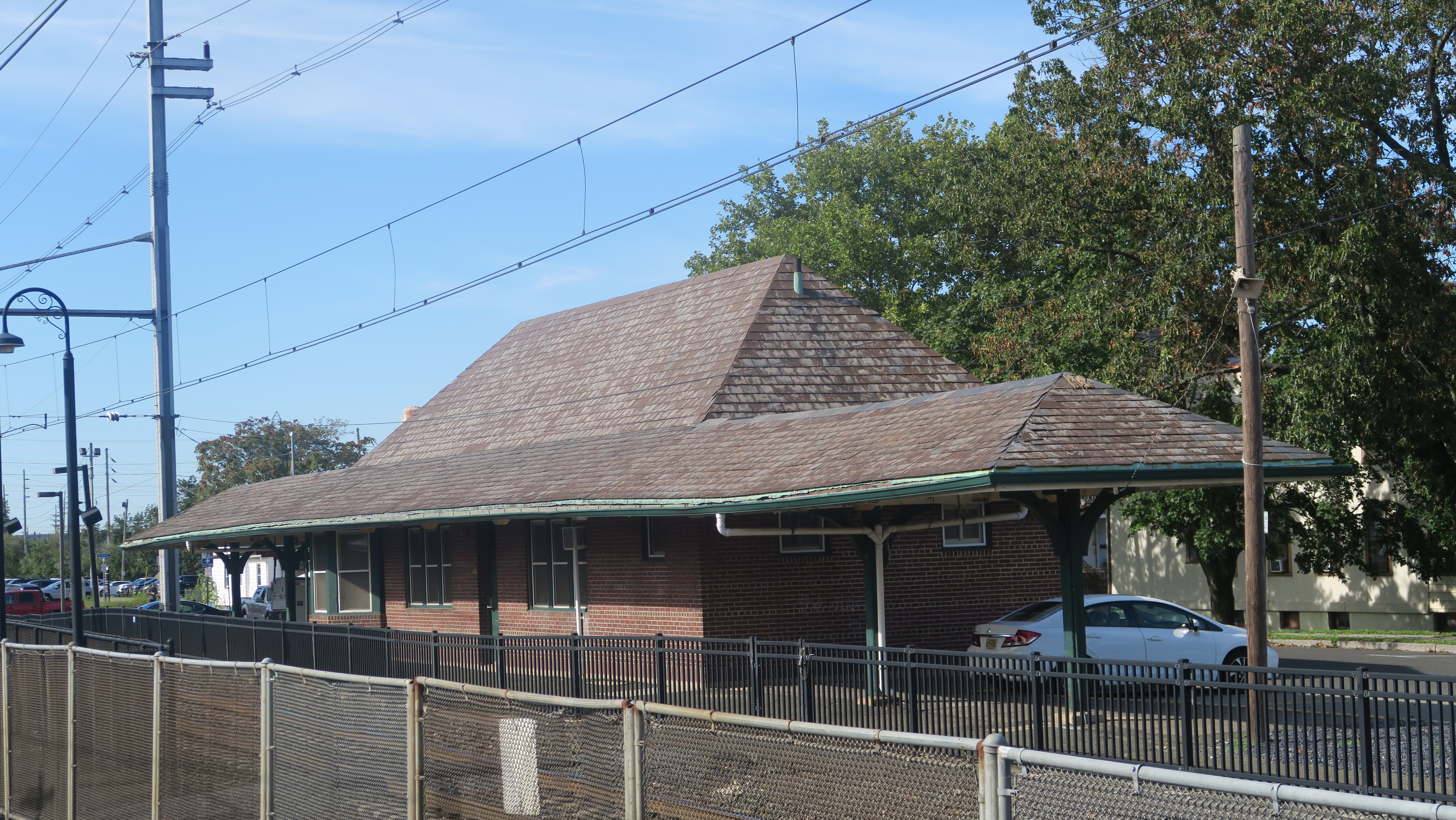
The former Central Railroad of New Jersey station depot in South Amboy

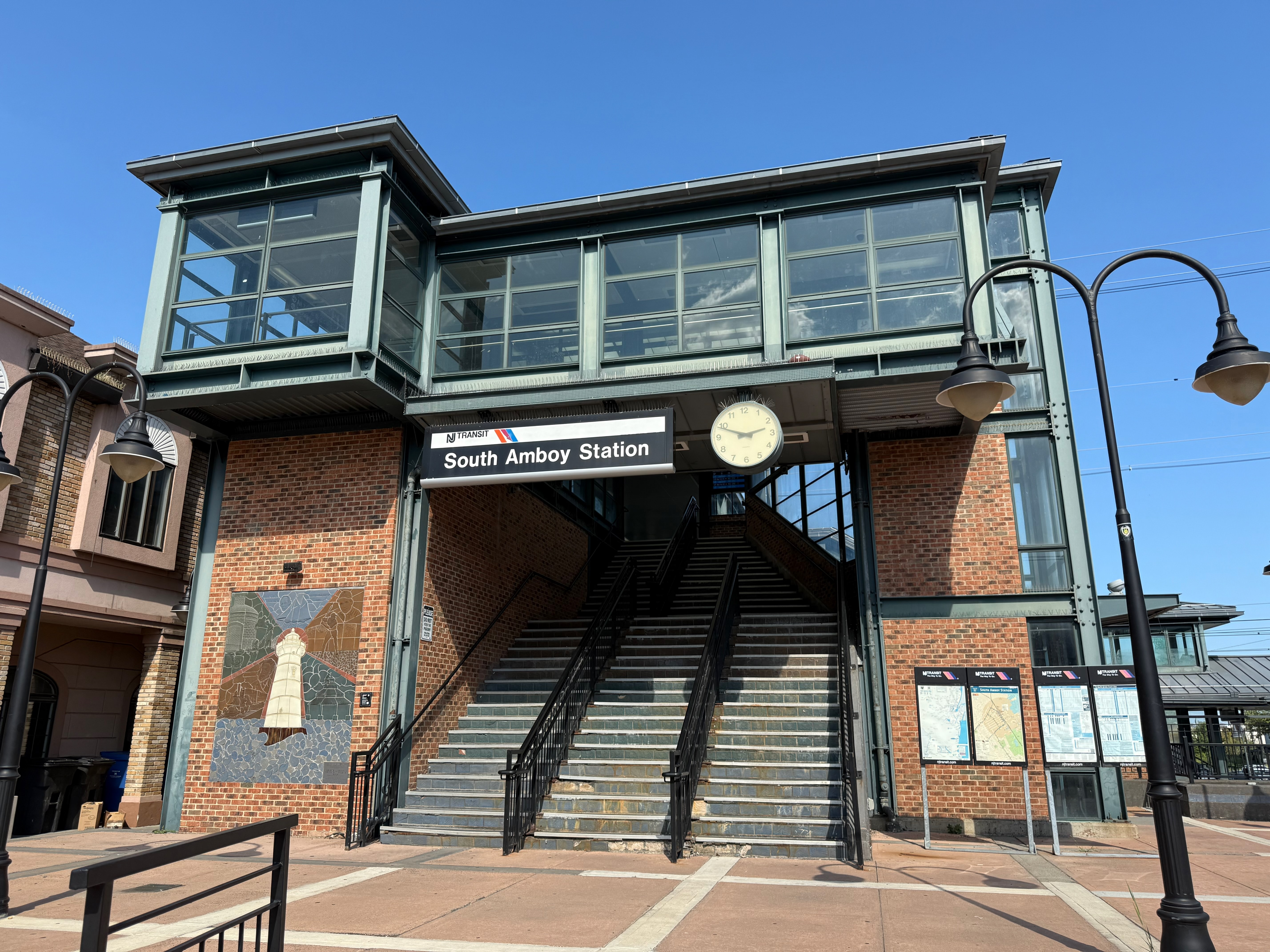
Main entry steps at the plaza facing North Broadway

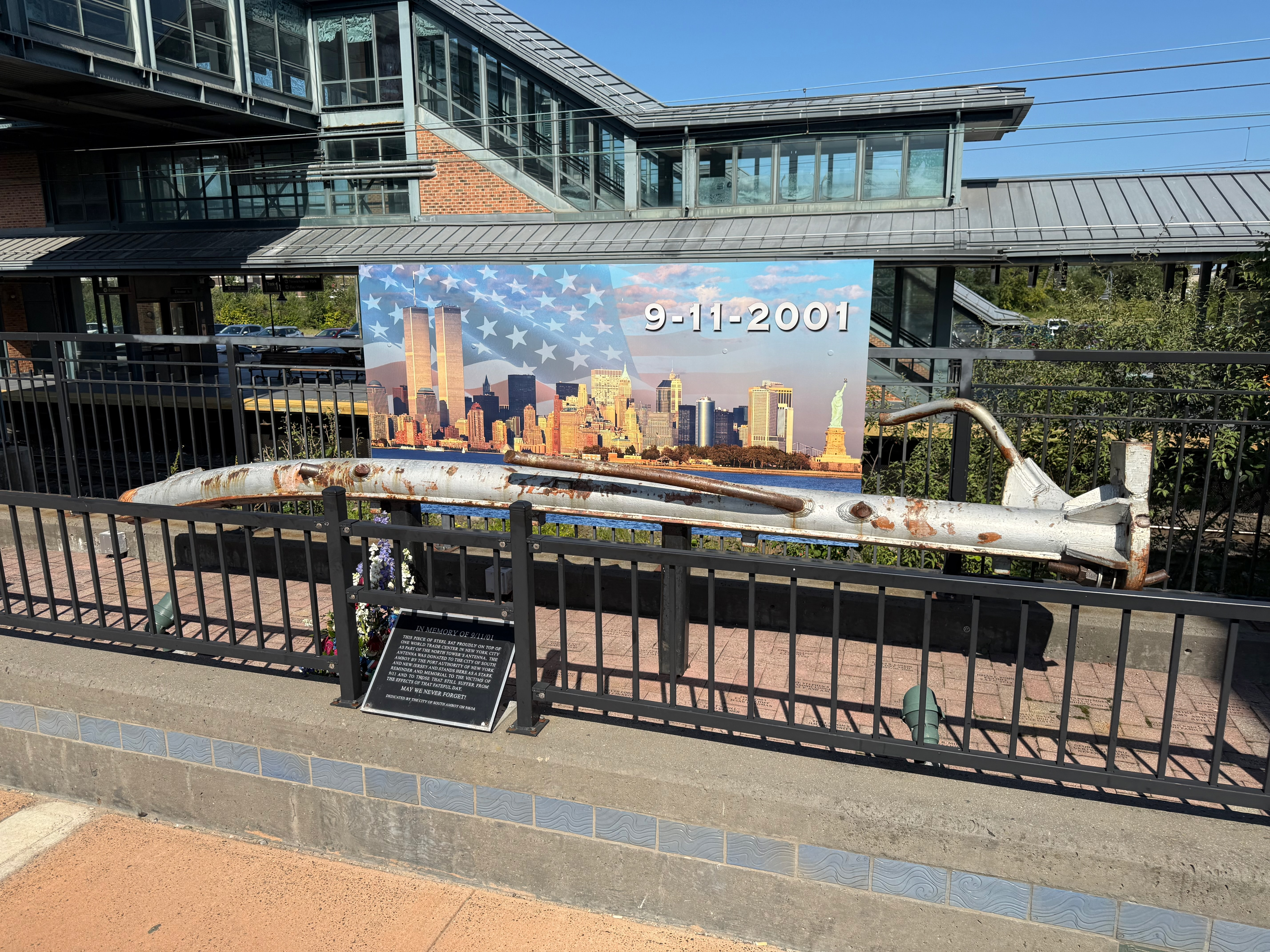
September 11 memorial

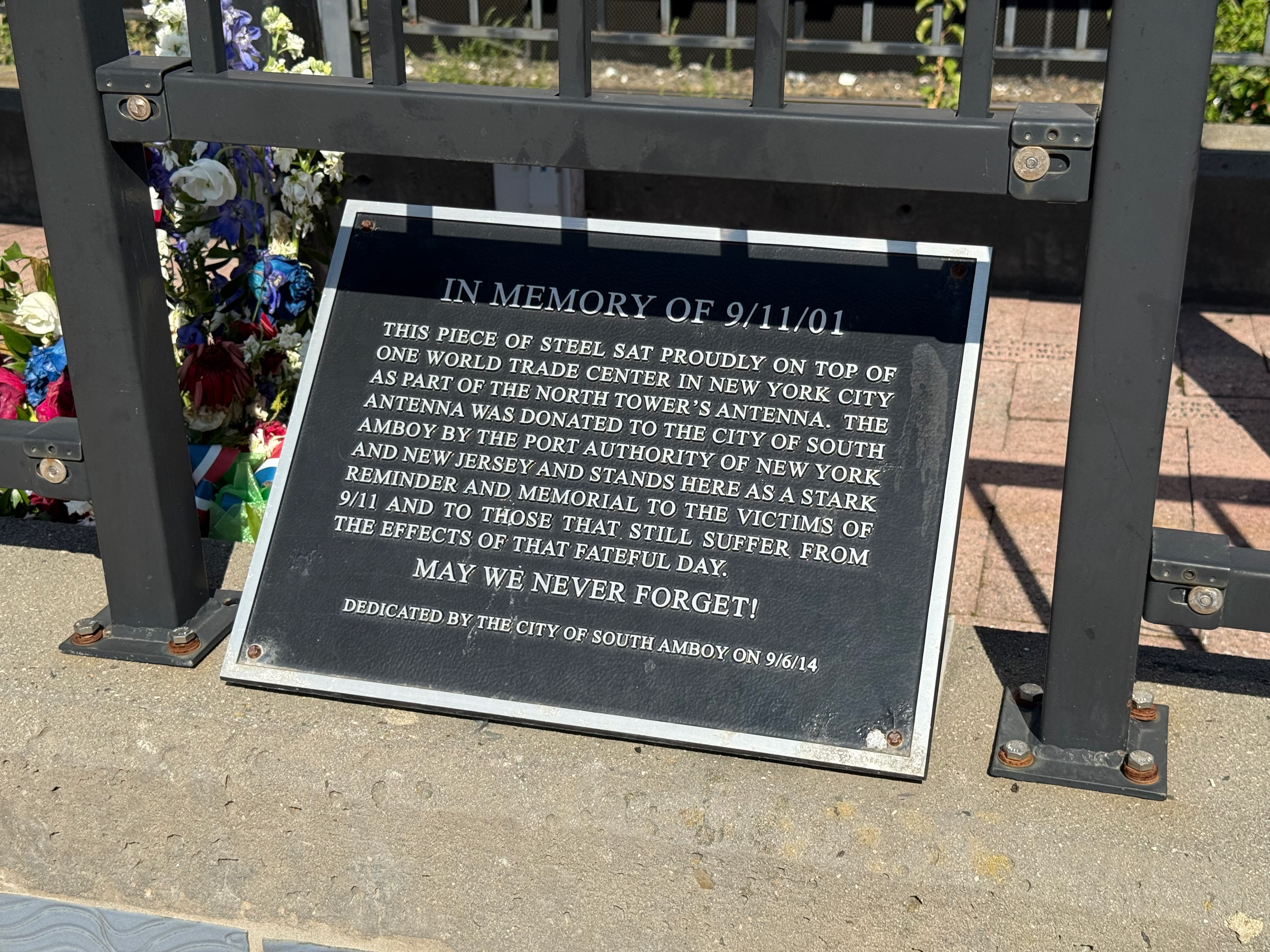
September 11 memorial plaque
