= Cheesequake State Park =

State park in New Jersey, United States

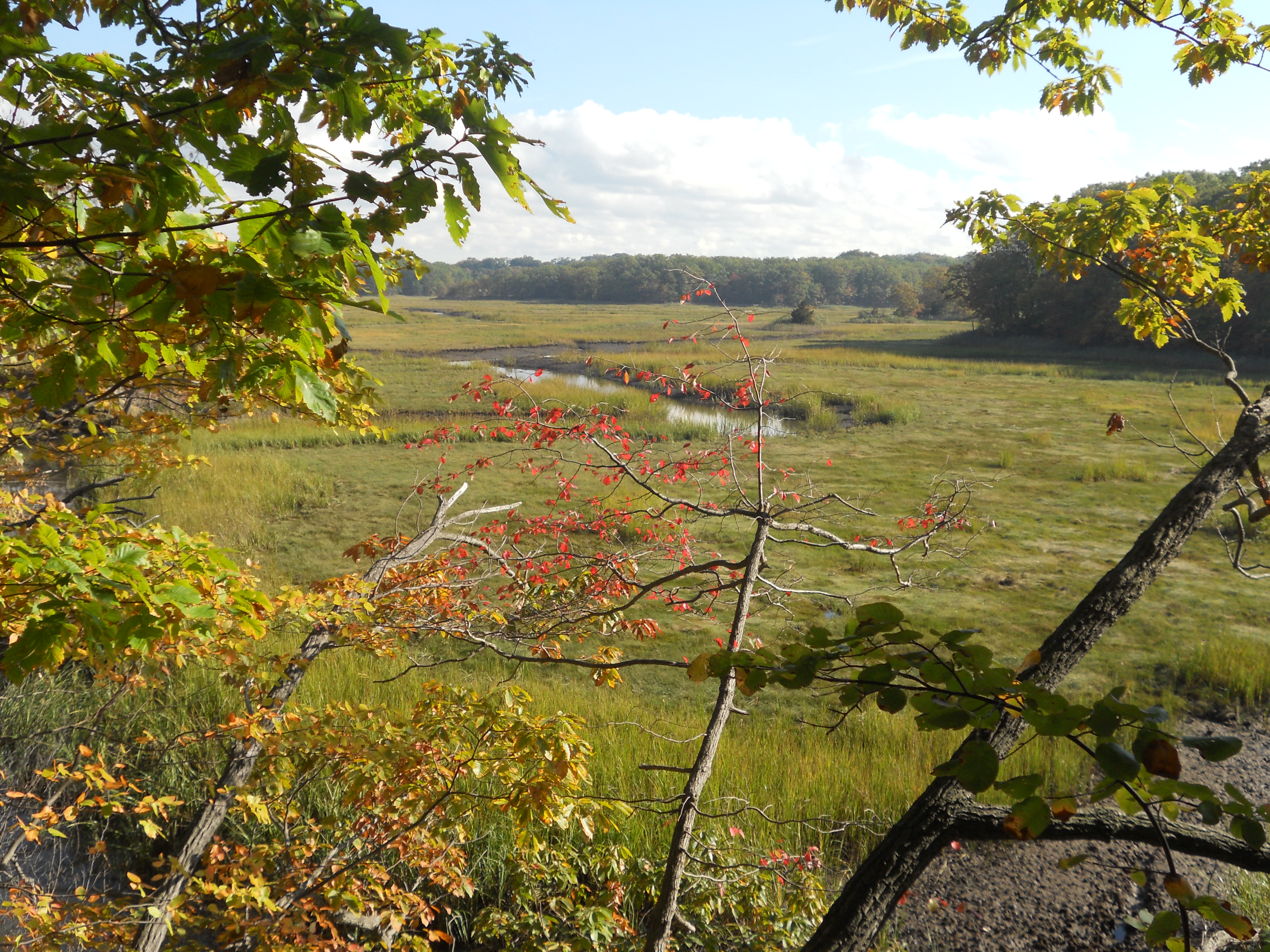
- Cheesequake Marsh from Cheesequake State Park

- Location within Middlesex County, New Jersey
- Type: State Park
- Location: Old Bridge, New Jersey
- Nearest city: South Amboy, New Jersey
- Coordinates: 40°26′06″N 74°16′13″W
- Area: 1,610 acres (2.52 mi^{2})
- Elevation: 52 feet (16 m)
- Opened: 1940
- Etymology: Lenape: Chiskhakink (Cheseh-oh-ke, Chichequaas), meaning "upland," "upland village," or "at the land that has been cleared"
- Operator: New Jersey Department of Environmental Protection, New Jersey Division of Parks and Forestry
- Visitors: 1,396,737 (in 2013)
- Open: Year round
- Status: Open
- Camp sites: 53 sites plus 6 large group sites (available May 1 – October 31)
- Hiking trails: 5 trails, lengths range from 1.5 to 3.5 miles
- Designation: Marine and Intertidal
- Website: Cheesequake State Park
Hooks Creek Lake
- Location within New Jersey
- Coordinates: 40.439318°N 74.269443°W
- Type: Man-made
- Managing agency: New Jersey Department of Environmental Protection, Division of Parks and Forestry
- Surface area: 10.6 acres (43,000 m^{2})
- Average depth: 5.5 feet (1.7 metres)
- Max. depth: 7.3 feet (2.2 metres)
- Water volume: 72,800 cubic metres (72,800,000 litres)
- Residence time: 259 days

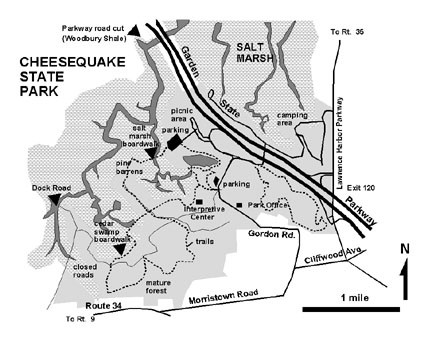
Map of Cheesequake State Park in Old Bridge, New Jersey

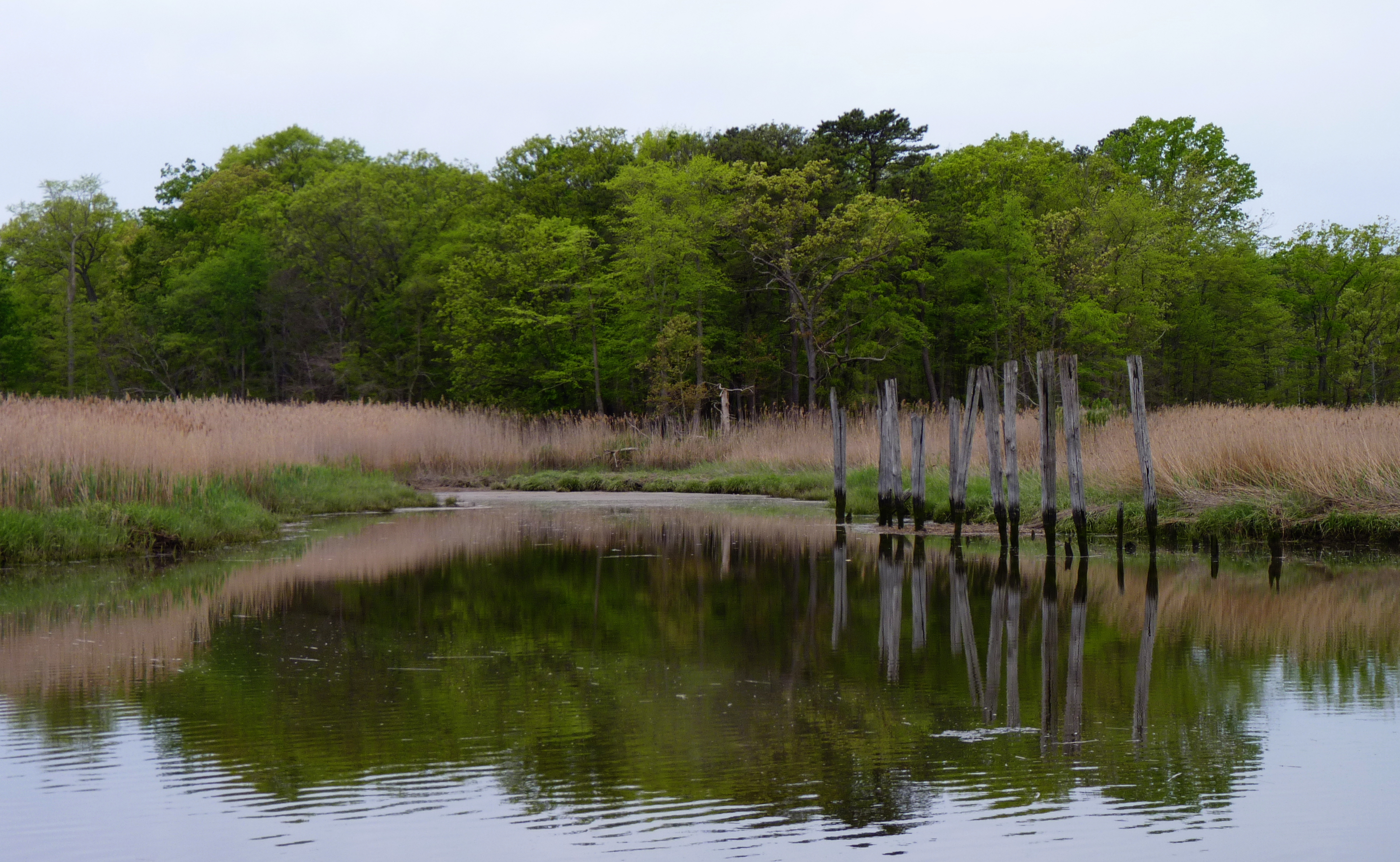
Cheesequake Creek

Cheesequake State Park is a 1,610-acre (2.52 mi^{2}) state park located in Old Bridge, Middlesex County, New Jersey, in the United States.

The New Jersey Legislature allocated $100,000 in 1937 to purchase property for the park. The state first acquired a 250-acre (100 ha) tract of farmland and a Civil War-era mansion from the Favier brothers in January 1938. Additional lands were acquired over the next two years, and the Civil Conservation Corps, part of the Works Progress Administration, helped develop the property. The park was opened in June 1940. It is operated and maintained by the New Jersey Division of Parks and Forestry and is part of the New Jersey Coastal Heritage Trail Route.

The name Cheesequake has been variously described as deriving from the Lenape words Cheseh-oh-ke ("upland"), Chichequaas ("upland village"), or Chiskhakink ("at the land that has been cleared").

== Geography, flora, and fauna ==
The park's lowlands consist of freshwater and saltwater marsh and a tidal estuary near the mouth of Cheesequake Creek on the Raritan Bay. It also includes hills of Northeastern hardwood forest, open fields, and a white cedar swamp. It includes a small parcel of Atlantic coastal pine barrens, consisting of pine forest in sandy soil, an isolated section of the much larger New Jersey Pine Barrens. It also includes the 6-acre (24,000 m^{2}) Hooks Creek Lake, a freshwater lake where recreational fishing features trout, largemouth bass, catfish, and sunfish. Crabbing is also available at the park.

== Facilities, activities, and trails ==
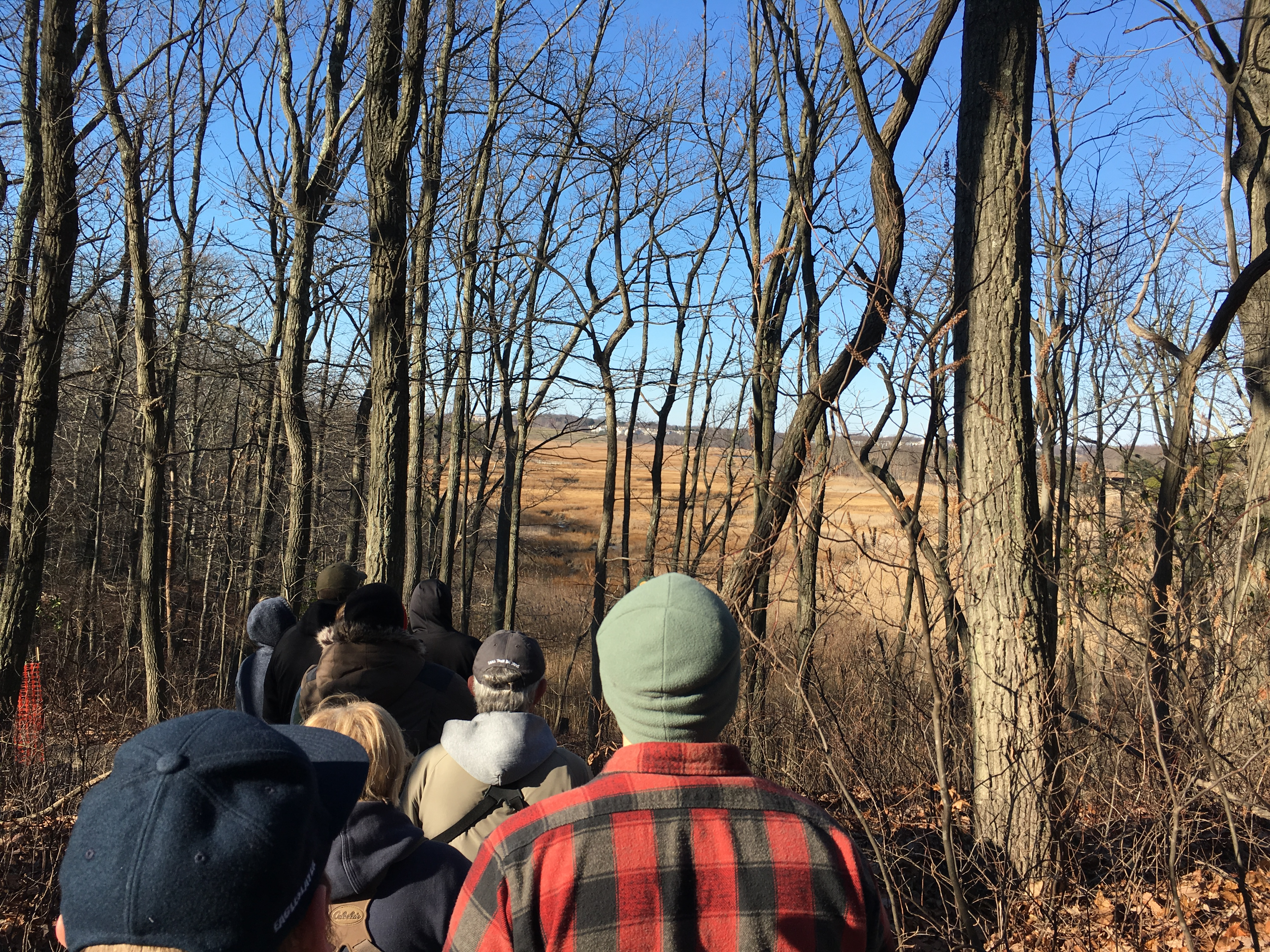
Participants in a First Day Hike in the park in 2017 walk through the hardwood forest above and see the marshes below

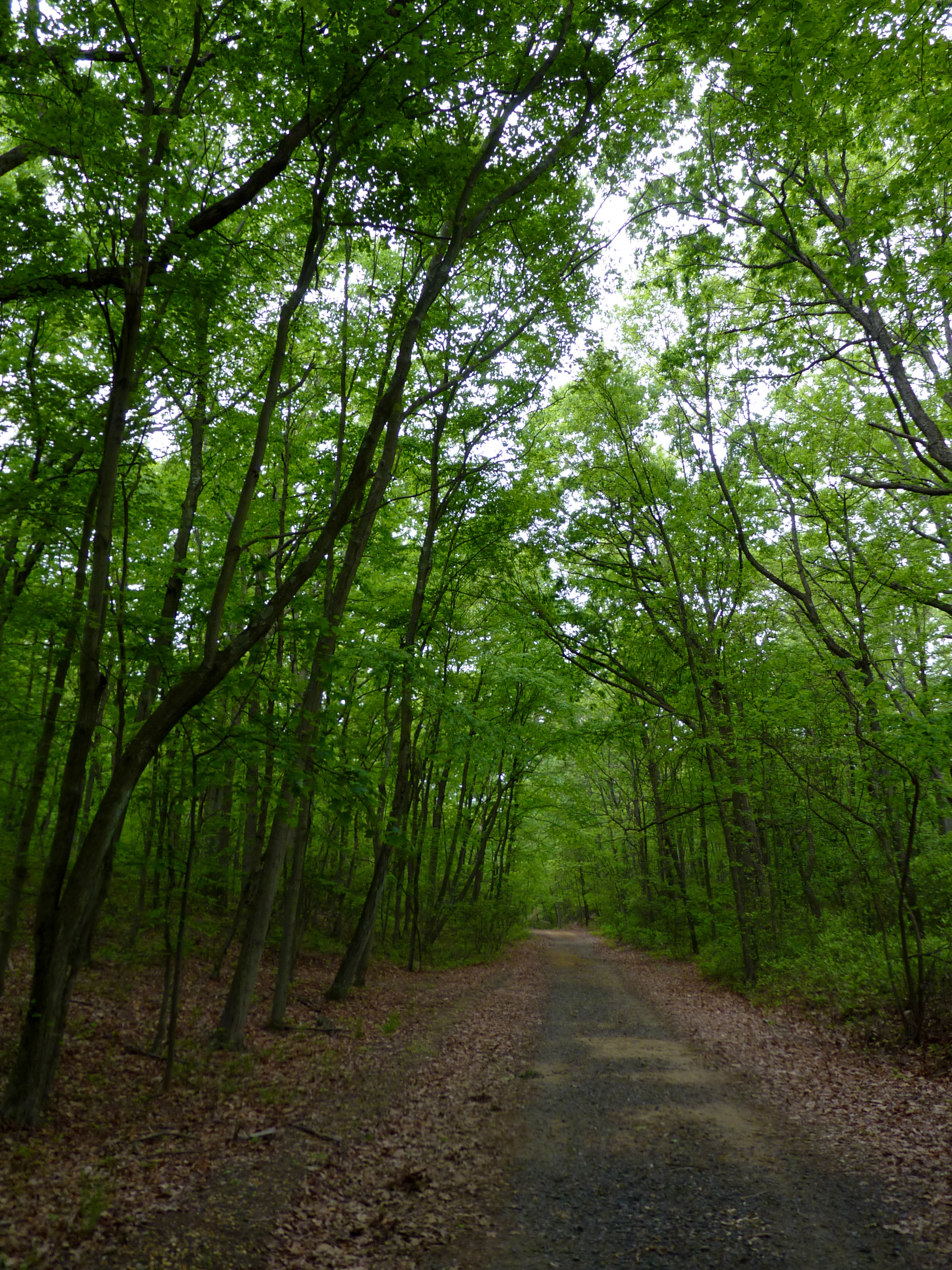
Museum Road in Cheesequake State Park

The park includes an interpretive center and five marked trails for both hiking and mountain biking that run throughout the wooded hills and across long wooden bridges across marshland. The park has designated camping areas available by reservation. Swimming and boating are summertime activities, while sledding, cross-country skiing, and snowshoeing are available in wintertime.

The Garden State Parkway runs through the park near exit 120 but offers no direct access. A road runs underneath the parkway to connect the northern and southern sides of the park. Parts of the park, including a picnic area, are visible from the parkway. Aberdeen-Matawan station (New Jersey Transit) is located about two miles east of the park.

== See also ==
- List of New Jersey state parks
