= Aberdeen–Matawan station =

NJ Transit rail station

Aberdeen–Matawan
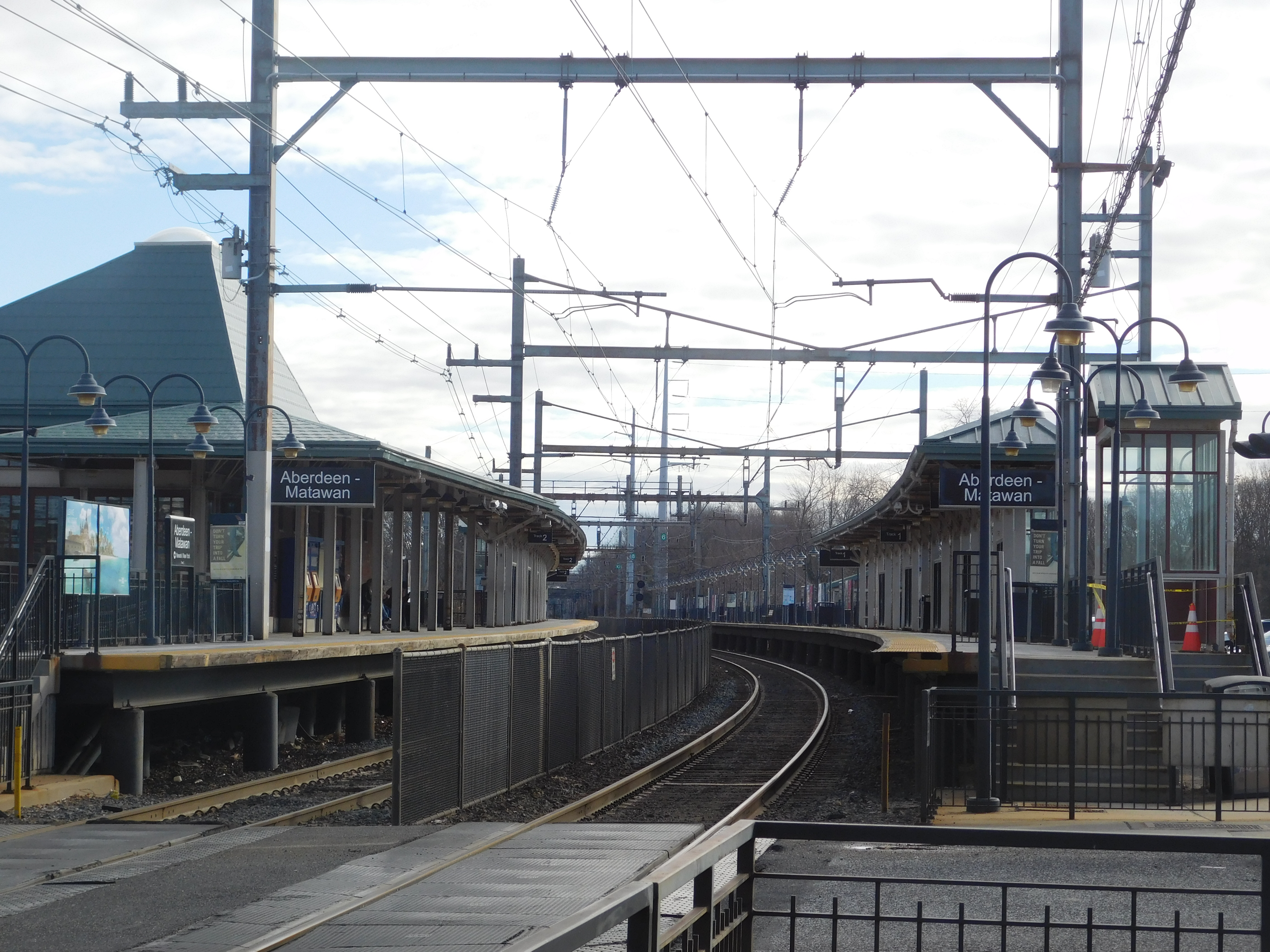
- Aberdeen–Matawan station in January 2018.

General information
- Location: Main Street and Atlantic Avenue; Matawan, NJ 07747
- Owner: NJ Transit
- Platforms: 2 side platforms
- Tracks: 2

Construction
- Parking: Yes
- Cycle facilities: Yes
- Accessible: yes

Other information
- Fare zone: 15

History
- Opened: June 25, 1875 (ceremonial); July 1, 1875 (regular service)
- Rebuilt: May 10–November 3, 1983

Passengers
- 2025: 1,228 (average weekday)
- Rank: 25 of 153

Services
Preceding station	NJ Transit	Following station
Hazlet toward Bay Head	North Jersey Coast Line	South Amboy toward New York
Former services
Preceding station	Central Railroad of New Jersey	Following station
Terminus	Freehold Branch	Stillwell Street toward Freehold
Terminus	Seashore Branch	Keyport toward East Long Branch
Preceding station	New York and Long Branch Railroad	Following station
Hazlet toward Bay Head Junction	Main Line	Cliffwood toward Perth Amboy
- Matawan Station
- U.S. National Register of Historic Places
- New Jersey Register of Historic Places
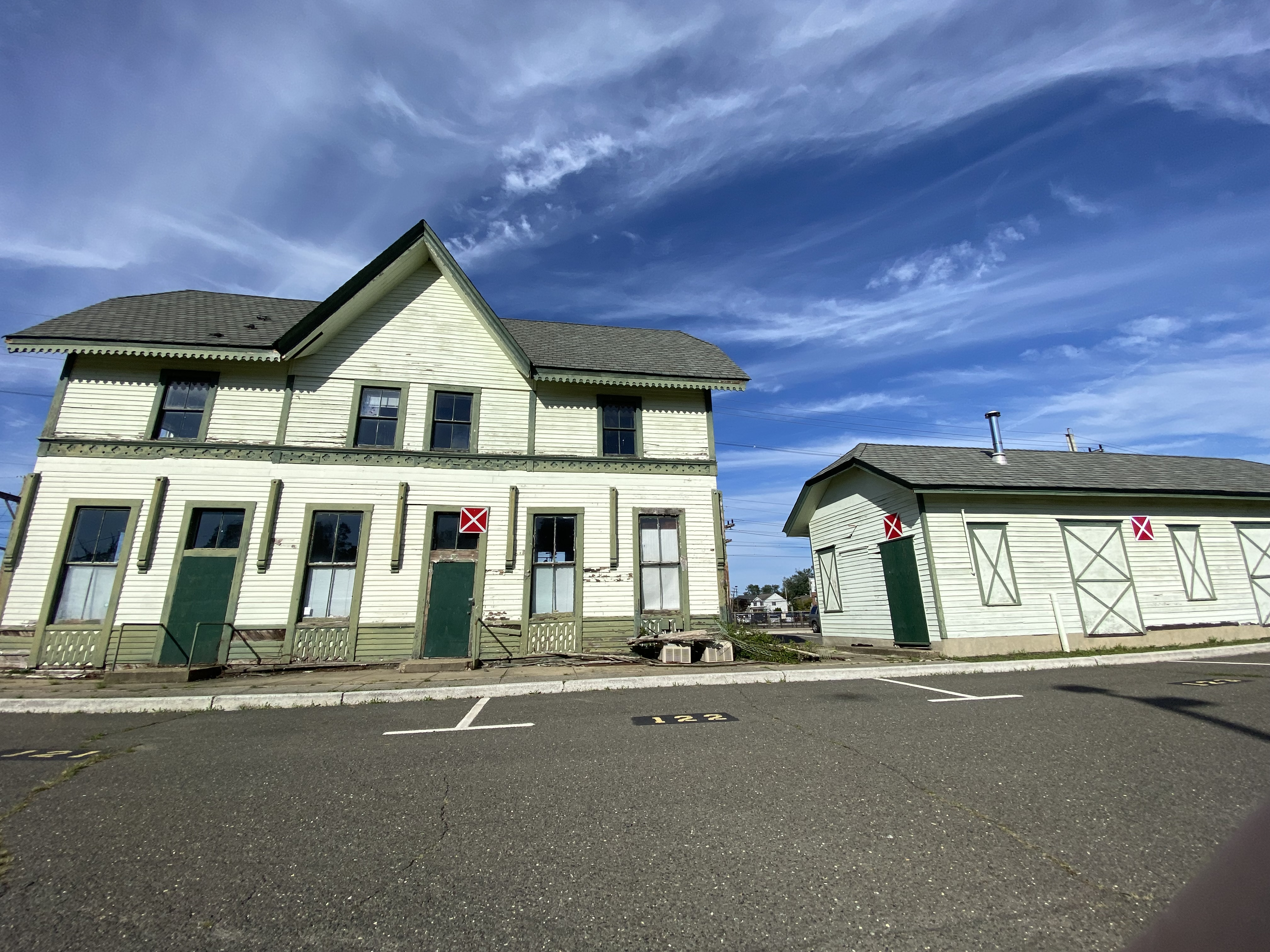
- The back of the former Central Railroad of New Jersey depot at Aberdeen–Matawan in September 2023
- Interactive map of Matawan Station
- Location: Matawan, New Jersey, USA
- Coordinates: 40°25′12.70″N 74°13′24.98″W
- Area: 0.5 acres (0.20 ha)
- Built: 1875
- Architectural style: Stick-Eastlake, Carpenter Gothic
- MPS: Operating Passenger Railroad Stations TR
- NRHP reference No.: 84002756
- NJRHP No.: 2017

Significant dates
- Added to NRHP: June 22, 1984
- Designated NJRHP: March 17, 1984
Location

Aberdeen–Matawan is a station on NJ Transit's North Jersey Coast Line, located in Aberdeen and Matawan, Monmouth County, New Jersey, United States. This station, convenient to Route 35 and the PNC Bank Arts Center, is popular with both commuters and concertgoers, and is the busiest station on the line between Bay Head and Rahway.

The station is located at grade on Atlantic Avenue, on the border of Aberdeen and Matawan, and has two high side platforms, as well as two abandoned low side platforms, and two tracks. A ticket office is located on the New York-bound platform. All trains on the North Jersey Coast Line serve this station. The former Freehold Branch can still be traced in a southeastern parking lot.

== History ==
For many years, the New York and Long Branch Railroad-built station was known as just Matawan, as its stationhouse and main platform were in Matawan, and only an auxiliary platform and large extra parking area were in Aberdeen.

The original building was opened on July 1, 1875, as a temporary station for regular service. It was the first station built on the line and was estimated to cost between $4,000 and $6,000 at the time. In 1982, the original building was closed and replaced by a small, one-story building on the north side of the tracks, to accommodate morning rush hour travelers commuting into New York City. The station was electrified in 1983 under New Jersey Transit as just a one-stop extension from the original end of electrification under the Pennsylvania Railroad in South Amboy. In 1984, the original station building was listed in the New Jersey Register of Historic Places and National Register of Historic Places as part of the Operating Passenger Railroad Stations Thematic Resource.

When the station was reconstructed and expanded in the 1990s, the new stationhouse and main platforms were built on the Aberdeen (eastern) side of Atlantic Avenue. NJ Transit considered renaming the station to just Aberdeen, but Matawan officials protested, since much of the town's recognition factor was due to the heavy use of the station by central New Jersey residents. Thus, the joint Aberdeen-Matawan name was adopted. All three station buildings are still in existence.

In 2003, the area surrounding the station was designated a Transit Village by the New Jersey Department of Transportation. Work began on the redevelopment of the surrounding area in August 2016. In October 2018, a new mixed used development called "The Link at Aberdeen Station" was opened right next to the station on the Aberdeen side, replacing the abandoned Zobel paint factory. In late 2023, construction began on a mixed used development called "Matawan Junction" on the intersection of Main and High Streets, two blocks away from the current station, an empty lot which had been abandoned since 1984.

== See also ==
- List of NJ Transit stations
- National Register of Historic Places listings in Monmouth County, New Jersey
