= Bradley Beach station =

NJ Transit rail station

Bradley Beach
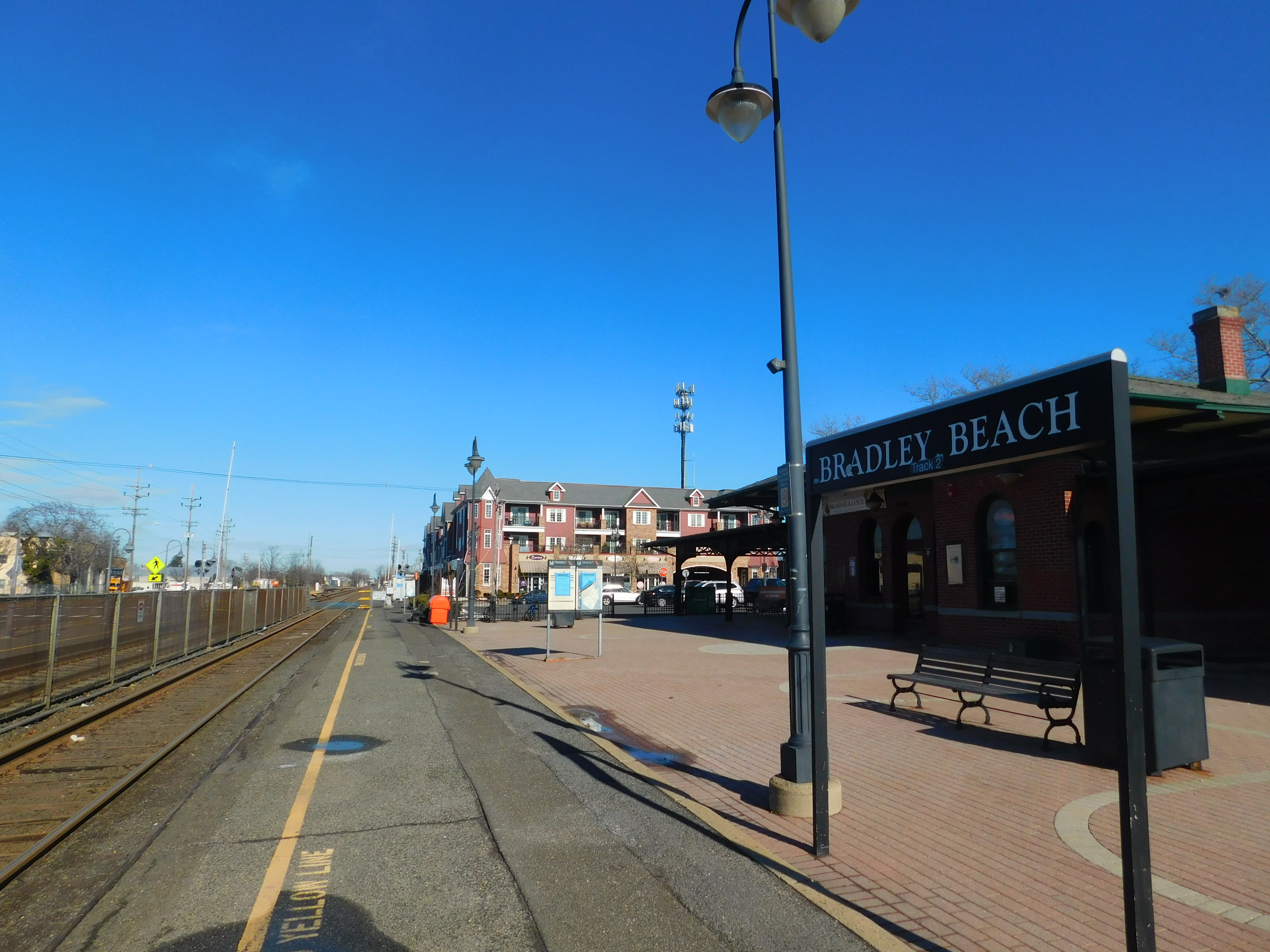
- Bradley Beach station facing the station depot and northbound platform.

General information
- Location: Railroad Square between Brinley and LaReine Avenues; Bradley Beach, New Jersey 07720
- Owner: NJ Transit
- Platforms: 2 side platforms
- Tracks: 2
- Connections: NJ Transit Bus: 317, 830

Construction
- Parking: 77 spaces (73 standard, 4 accessible)
- Cycle facilities: Yes
- Accessible: No

Other information
- Fare zone: 21

History
- Opened: June 24, 1893
- Rebuilt: April 5, 1912–c. August 1, 1912

Passengers
- 2025: 130 (average weekday)
- Rank: 110 of 153

Services
Preceding station	NJ Transit	Following station
Belmar toward Bay Head	North Jersey Coast Line	Asbury Park toward New York
Former services
Preceding station	New York and Long Branch Railroad	Following station
Avon toward Bay Head Junction	Main Line	Asbury Park toward Perth Amboy
- Bradley Beach Station
- U.S. National Register of Historic Places
- New Jersey Register of Historic Places
- Interactive map of Bradley Beach Station
- Location: Bradley Beach, NJ, USA
- Coordinates: 40°12′13″N 74°1′8″W
- Area: 3 acres (1 ha)
- Built: 1912
- Architect: Mason Romeyn Strong
- Architectural style: Renaissance
- MPS: Operating Passenger Railroad Stations TR
- NRHP reference No.: 84002749
- NJRHP No.: 1963

Significant dates
- Added to NRHP: June 22, 1984
- Designated NJRHP: March 17, 1984
Location

Bradley Beach station is an active commuter railroad station in the eponymous borough of Bradley Beach, Monmouth County, New Jersey, Located at Railroad Square, Bradley Beach station serves trains of NJ Transit's North Jersey Coast Line between Bay Head in Ocean County and New York Penn Station. Bradley Beach station is on the diesel only section of the line south of Long Branch. The station has a pair of low-level side platforms, one of which parallels Memorial Drive and has the standing Central Railroad of New Jersey depot on the inbound platform. A parking lot surrounds the station depot, which is on the National Register of Historic Places and hosts a café.

Built on a site owned by the Ocean Grove Camp Meeting Association, Mayor James A. Bradley of Asbury Park spent $1,500 to build a new station on their property. The station was little more than a small shanty formerly used as a lecture hall at the Asbury Park Excursion Grounds. Bradley Beach station opened to pomp and circumstance on June 24, 1893. Repeatedly promised a new station by New York and Long Branch Railroad Superintendent Rufus Blodgett, no progress was made until the railroad came under the supervision of Lee W. Berry. A point of contention in building a new station was the lack of Sunday service in the area because of an agreement between the railroad and the Ocean Grove Camp Meeting Association. Sunday service began at Bradley Beach station on July 4, 1912 and a new station opened under a month later. The Camp Meeting Association attempted twice (in 1919 and 1920–1921) to gain possession of the station grounds due to a violation of the 1893 agreement. Bradley Beach gained title of the depot square in May 1921.

In 1938, the station name was renamed Bradley Beach–Neptune after repeated complaints by Neptune Township for representation. The station was added to the National Register of Historic Places on June 22, 1984 as part of the Operating Passenger Railroad Stations Thematic Resource. Following the elimination of the ticket agent at Bradley Beach on July 1, 1981 as part of greater cuts, the station depot went into a state of neglect with the windows being boarded up and covered in graffiti. After municipal pressure to get the station renovated, NJ Transit started a project in 1996 and finished it in June 1997 to have the depot re-opened.

== History ==
=== Establishment and growth (1893–1909) ===
By early 1893, Bradley Beach was a growing section of Neptune Township and on March 28, the small community became an incoporated borough. The Ocean Grove Camp Meeting Association offered land for construction of a new railroad station in Bradley Beach along the New York and Long Branch Railroad, a joint venture between the Central Railroad of New Jersey and the Pennsylvania Railroad. This land, 250 by 300 feet (76 m × 91 m) in size, was given to the railroad for free and James A. Bradley contributed $1,500 (1893 USD) for construction of a new railroad station. The new station depot at Bradley Beach cost $500 to build. Bradley donated the station depot, which had served as a lecture hall at the Asbury Park Excursion Grounds.

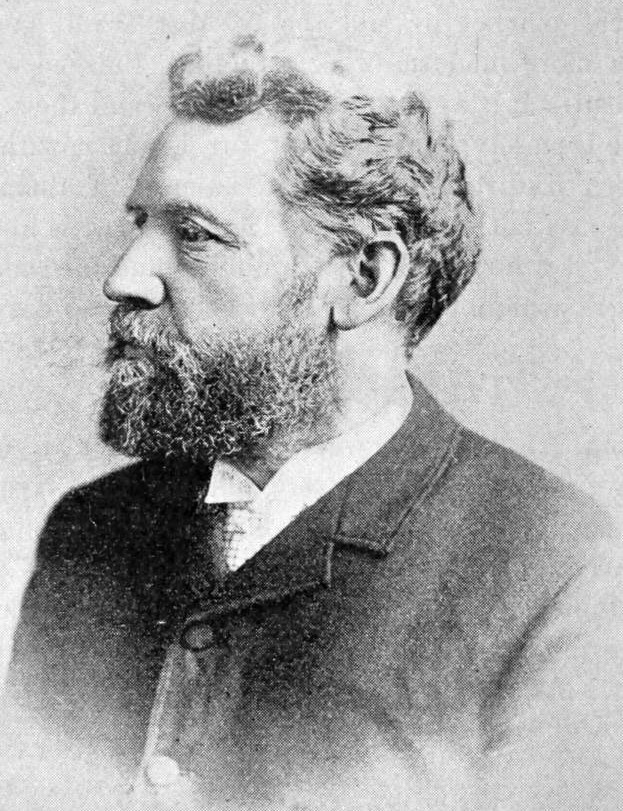
James A. Bradley, c. 1893

On June 24, 1893, an opening ceremony was held at the new Bradley Beach railroad station. They illuminated the new station with candles for lighting and placed flammable tar barrels in the square the station stood. A new platform was built from the south end of the square, where opening speeches were held. More than 1,500 people attended the opening ceremony at 7:00 p.m. that evening. West Asbury Park's Excelsior brass band and the Bradley Beach drum corps attended the ceremony to play music. A children's chorus sung a song before Bradley took the stage. Clarence Steiner, whose firm helped develop much of Bradley Beach, followed another musical performance. A member of the Ocean Grove Camp Meeting Association also spoke. Rufus Blodgett, who served as the superintendent of the New York and Long Branch Railroad, also spoke, stating the new station would be operated on a year-long basis rather than serving as only a summer sport. Blodgett added that the resort would help the railroad.

The poor conditions of the station at Bradley Beach, little more than a shed for passengers, and the station's location away from the Bradley Beach Hotel and various boarding houses, a half-hour walk. All local stagecoach operations also were using the station at Asbury Park and none were using Bradley Beach station. The primary problem for ridership at Bradley Beach was the lack of railroad service on Sundays in Asbury Park and Ocean Grove, a request by the Ocean Grove Camp Meeting Association. The Camp Meeting Association made the deal that no train would stop within 1 mile (1.6 km) in order to get land for Interlaken station. Sunday service along the New York and Long Branch Railroad ended at Interlaken, north of Bradley Beach. Locals suggested that proper stagecoach service would make Bradley Beach a proper terminus for Sunday service instead of Interlaken.

The Central Railroad of New Jersey limited service at Bradley Beach station until June 1903. By that time, the station had a regular 35+ commuters daily. At that time, the railroad introduced a 7:22 a.m. stop at Bradley Beach, a train that went local to Long Branch station, where it would then express to Communipaw Terminal in Jersey City. Thomas Somers, a businessman from New York City who owned property at Bradley Beach, put his influence on the railroad to make this train stop. The railroad also added that June 1903 had been the most prosperous month for the railroad since the opening of the station in 1893.

As part of an agreement on July 28, 1904 between the railroad and the Camp Meeting Association, the Interlaken station would be abandoned in order to get Sunday service to be extended to North Asbury Park station. The new arrangement would be enforced as of August 7. Influence of citizens got the railroad to add stops at Bradley Beach on their theater train starting in February 1909.

=== Negotiations for a new depot (1909–1911) ===
With an announcement that the railroad was going to build a new station depot at Asbury Park in September 1909, locals in Bradley Beach began renewed efforts to get a new one in the borough. A newly organized Bradley Beach Board of Trade announced a new plan on September 10, 1909 to meet Rufus Blodgett with a petition to build a new station. They added that if a new station could not be built, that they at least get the current structure repaired. The Board of Trade also stated that they would request permission to replace the shrubbery around the current depot and plant new flowers to help beautify the structure.

In February 1910, the first proposal was offered to get Bradley Beach a new station. The proposal involved moving the closed station at Interlaken, a stone structure that had been abandoned with the 1904 deal with the Camp Meeting Association. With the station unused, locals thought it would be possible to put the building on flat cars and transport it to Bradley Beach overnight. The status of Interlaken depot also was seen as a way to get Blodgett to agree to move the building. At the same time, a proposal to move the freight station at Bradley Beach to a location near Springwood Avenue in Asbury Park (near the passenger depot) failed because of lack of space in a nearby meadow.

However, in March 1910, C.W. Huntington, the general superintendent for the railroad, announced that plans were in the works to replace the station depot at Braley beach with a new structure. This new station would be located on the site of the existing depot. That week, a crew of 20 railroad workers began doing survey work in Bradley Beach in the square around the existing station depot while they had been installing a new track from Corliers Avenue in the West Grove section of Neptune Township to Fourth Avenue in Bradley Beach. This new track would be used for summer excursion trains. This would also involve improvements to the southbound main line track at Bradley Beach station.

The Central Railroad of New Jersey approved $6,500 (1910 USD) in late April 1910 for construction of a new station depot at Bradley Beach. The new station would be a rough model in design of the station at Little Silver.

Angst began developing by February 1911, with the dilapidated boxcar serving as a station and no word on replacement progress. The Board of Trade stated that they would make the station grounds presentable for the railroad to build a new station at. C. Arthur Hall, who served as the president, stated that the railroad would build a new station if they could eliminate the Sunday service restriction in Bradley Beach. They decided that they would make a committee to talk to the Asbury Park Board of Trade to determine the future of Sunday service in the two communities. They also stated they received letters from the Central Railroad of New Jersey and the Pennsylvania Railroad about the problems in Bradley Beach. The Pennsylvania Railroad stated they were less interested in helping the municipality, resulting in the proposal of a boycott of the company's service. By doing so, they would put pressure on the railroad and offer better service at Bradley Beach station.

At a meeting in Bradley Beach on February 22, 1911, officials from the Central Railroad of New Jersey, including new superintendent L.W. Berry (who replaced Blodgett), met with political officials from the municipality at the Board of Trade. The three railroad officials, Berry, Mayor Edwin Parker of Long Branch (who was also the freight agent for the New York and Long Branch Railroad) and former mayor Charles McFadden, who was the general passenger agent, met with new mayor William E. MacDonald and other locals with the Bradley Beach Board of Trade. They arrived at Bradley Beach on a 3:30 p.m. train that was greeted by over 100 residents of the borough. There, the officials were brought in automobiles on a tour of Bradley Beach, ending up at Borough Hall. At Borough Hall, they had a meeting in the Council Chambers to discuss the ridership and costs figures for a new station in the municipality.

MacDonald started the discussion at Borough Hall, stating that stations along the line with smaller populations such as Avon-by-the-Sea, Belmar and Allenhurst had more train stops and better depots than the stop at Bradley Beach. He added that the population of Bradley Beach had been growing and that 300 people were going to Asbury Park station instead because of the lack of service at Bradley Beach station. MacDonald also noted that freight services had gone up significantly, requiring two agents rather than one to handle all the business. MacDonald added that Blodgett's agreement in 1893 was that a new station would be built at Bradley Beach by 1898, but that it had never happened. Instead, paint had been replaced multiple times and a new floor had been installed at the station. Joseph McLaughlin, a member of the Board of Trade, added that he had issues renting local cottages because of the lack of train stops at Bradley Beach despite the fact that many trains already passed through the station on a daily basis. Berry responded by stating that he personally had started discussions internally about improving the amount of train stops at Bradley Beach. He added that they had already made an extra stop on a New York-bound train. Dr. Hugh Sutherland Kinmonth, a local doctor, added that he was embarrassed to tell people that the station depot at Bradley Beach was nothing but a shanty for local tramps to sleep at. He added that he would rather lie and state that the railroad had no station at Bradley Beach than embarrass himself with the existing structure.

Berry stated that he felt that Bradley Beach officials deserved a new station and would work to get them a new one, despite not making any official promises. He felt that the existing station was a disgrace and that Bradley Beach really had no station whatsoever. Berry, Packer and McFadden stated that they would aid Bradley Beach officials in any way necessary to meet a shared goal. After the meeting, Berry, Packer and McFadden went to the Marlborough Hotel in Asbury Park for dinner along with local officials. It was added that Bradley Beach had raised $5,000 for construction of a new depot with plans submitted from an area architect. However, Blodgett refused to budge, citing the 1 mile (1.6 km) rule from the Camp Meeting Association. MacDonald stated that hopefully they would get to install a new cornerstone of a new depot and citizens outside the Marlborough applauded.

=== New depot and Sunday service (1911–1912) ===
William Barton, the Secretary of the Board of Trade, requested on March 13, 1911 that all the gutter scrapings from streets in Bradley should be kept and reused for the beautification of the square around the station depot. The idea was that by installing new sidewalks in the plaza and placing new grass that it would entice railroad officials further to replace the station depot. Mud from the gutter would work as topsoil for new plants. Despite disagreement during a meeting at Borough Hall, the municipality agreed to save the mud for the Board of Trade to do as they wish. On the condition a new station depot was secured, Kinmonth and Thomas F. Somers offered $1,000 combined for beautification of the grounds. At the meeting, it was announced that the railroad had sent a couple of engineers to measure the station grounds and that L.W. Berry had informed the Board of Trade that four new trains would stop at Bradley Beach daily. These four would all be Pennsylvania Railroad trains headed for Philadelphia, Pennsylvania, an issue brought up at the February 22 meeting.

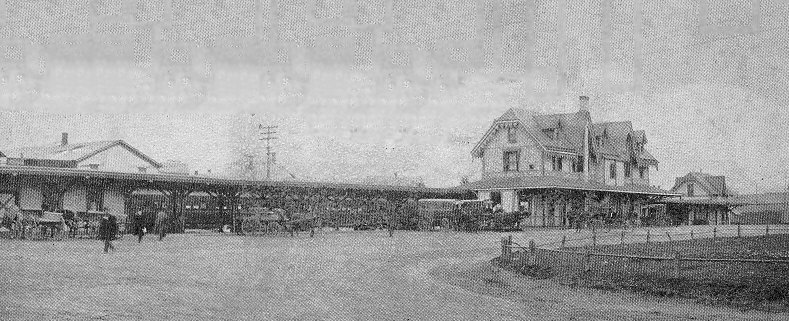
The Asbury Park–Ocean Grove station from a 1908 postcard

In July 1911, progress began on the introduction of Sunday train service to stations within the 1 mile (1.6 km) line of the Ocean Grove Camp Meeting Association. Asbury Park officials filed a case with the State Board of Public Utility Commissioners on July 8, demanding that trains that stopped at the North Asbury Park station should also stop at the main station in downtown Asbury Park, along with the other stations in the range.

With pressure from the Commissioners, the railroad began negotiations with the Camp Meeting Association to work on getting service on the Sundays and a purchase of a land for a new freight station in Asbury Park. These negotiations began on September 20, but if they could not agree to a decision, the Commissioners would file an order to force the railroad to stop at all stations affected by the original agreements. The negotiation was over the agreement's clause that if the Sunday service was instituted, the land ownership would return to the Camp Meeting Association. The railroad company agreed that it would continue to honor the original agreement and deny service on Sundays as requested. The Camp Meeting Association stated that the Commissioners had no authority to force the railroad to stop there.

On October 11, 1911, in spite of objections by the railroad and the Camp Meeting Association, the Commissioners ordered that the railroad begin making stops at Bradley Beach and Asbury Park–Ocean Grove stations as of November 1. The Commissioners stated that the railroad was a quasi-public corporation, created for a public purposes and was subject to the politics of the state. The board stated that the powers they have included one to secure proper transportation and transportation facilities for the general public, no matter what agreements have existed between the railroad and private organizations. They stated that they had no power to stop an agreement, nor would they consider the legality of the agreements between the railroad and the Camp Meeting Association.

With the agreement, the railroad would begin introducing Sunday theater train stops at Bradley Beach and Asbury Park–Ocean Grove stations on November 5, 1911. MacDonald talked to officials to confirm the railroad making these stops at Bradley Beach and new timetables reflecting the new services would start on November 4.

Despite announcing that they would take the fight over Sunday service to the Supreme Court of the United States over the right of the state to break an existing contract, the association gave Bradley Beach $100 on November 15, 1911 to help with the beautification process at the station depot. The railroad also announced that that week that they set aside $12,500 for the construction of a new station depot in Bradley Beach. Rumors surfaced that the station would become Bradley Beach–Ocean Grove station to reduce anger of the Camp Meeting Association, but locals did not want such a situation to occur. The Supreme Court of the United States affirmed the decision of the Public Utility Commissioners in late February 1912, which resulted in delayed start of Sunday service to Bradley Beach station. With that, municipal officials requested that the borough attorney confirm with the railroad the beginning of service will coincide with service at Asbury Park–Ocean Grove returning on March 3, 1912.

On March 7, the railroad announced the construction of a new railroad station at Bradley Beach. The new building would be a brick station depot that blended in sympathy to Bradley Beach Borough Hall at Railroad Square. This new station would cost $12,000–$14,000 and that the contract would be awarded on March 13. A contractor was doing work digging out a new basement for the station depot. Surveyors were present in late March 1912 to lay out the site of the new railroad station. Excavation would begin on April 2, 1912.

Construction of the new station began on April 5, 1912 but no ceremony was held for the occasion. Lines were placed for construction the night before and construction began in the morning. The firm of I.S. Rossell from New York City was the general contractor in charge of construction and the architect of the new station was Mason Romeyn Strong, also of New York City. The new station at Bradley Beach would be a 40 by 20 feet (12.2 m × 6.1 m) single-story red brick structure with a black slate roof. The station would have a large waiting room and modern ticket office. It would also have a baggage room near the rear of the station. A porte-cochère would be along Main Street. The cost would be $15,000 and a fence separating the tracks would be installed. With the failed negotiations between the railroad and Camp Meeting Association, the railroad would have built a new station on the southbound track with a shelter.

The New York and Long Branch Railroad declined a further attempt on in April 1912 to get the land on the west side of the tracks for construction of a station on the southbound side. The railroad company stated that the borough would have to try on their own to acquire the land. MacDonald stated that he would try to get the Camp Meeting Association to take James A. Bradley's offer. His offer included taking the land for the railroad station and giving the Camp Meeting Association an adjacent property for them to use as they wish. The borough would have until May 1 to get the Association to agree to a transfer. The Association instead offered a $100 per year lease of the land, but had rejected selling the land.

The Public Utility Commissioners filed an order on June 10, 1912 to restore Sunday services at Bradley Beach station as of July 1. The order was being made on base of discrimination of Bradley Beach compared to other new stations. The first Sunday train stopped at 2:12 p.m. on July 7, 1912 with a load of residents on board. However, no ceremony was held and trains began stopping on a regular basis. At that time, significant process had been made on the new station.

The new station would be finished by August 1, 1912. After the station opened, Bradley took possession of the former station depot he had donated for use by the railroad. Bradley chose to move the station to the beach at Ocean Avenue between Second Avenue and Evergreen Avenue to serve as a new summer house.

=== Station land quarrels (1913–1921) ===
Despite the construction and opening of a new station, the status of the land on the western side of the tracks was still in debate. Bradley Beach officials restarted plans for the waiting room on March 3, 1913. The new mayor of Bradley Beach, Walter Parker, reached out to Lee W. Berry to determine further progression. Berry stated that the municipality should focus on acquiring a 15-foot (4.6 m) wide strip of land on the west side of the tracks from the Camp Meeting Association. Berry stated that was the amount of room the railroad would need for a new structure. Berry added that the railroad would install three street lights at the station for the southbound platform. Parker announced himself and two other Councilmen as the delegation committee to sort out the situation, adding that Bradley's offer of a land swap was still on the table.

Parker announced to the Borough Council at a meeting on March 31 that the Camp Meeting Association had given 80 feet (24 m) of their property to become a public highway to run next to the railroad tracks. Parker and fellow Council members stated that they were confident they would get the land for the waiting room, but that they would have to inquire with Neptune Township to get streets closed in order to install the new waiting room. However, the former Mayor of Bradley Beach, T. Frank Appleby, stated that there was no maps in public files with that road laid out for future construction. A letter sent from the Camp Meeting Association on April 19, 1912 told Appleby that that the railroad could have 25 by 150 feet (7.6 m × 45.7 m) plot of land for $500, but was rejected by Berry soon afterwards. They added that the property was still available on the $500 offer.

After negotiations with Appleby and his real estate company, the New York and Long Branch Railroad purchased the land for the original asking price of $500 on April 7, 1913. At that point, the fence that separated the tracks was in place and this would be the impetus for a new waiting room on the southbound platform.

The Ocean Grove Camp Meeting Association reinstated their fight to enforce their original agreement with the New York and Long Branch Railroad by suing the railroad in the Circuit Court in Freehold on September 8, 1919. The Camp Meeting Association wanted control of the entire square around the Bradley Beach station, a 288-by-380-foot (88 m × 116 m) property that had the station depot and a statue honoring veterans of World War I. This property was valued at about $30,000. The Camp Meeting Association had made offers to purchase the square from the railroad, but the railroad refused all offers. With the lawsuit, the association stated that they had been unlawfully denied the property after the violation of the 1-mile (1.6 km) rule on March 1, 1912. On September 9, the borough voted to involve themselves as defendants on the lawsuit alongside the railroad in the case. The Council stated that the municipality had already put in monetary investments in improving the property, meaning that it should be considered a municipal building. The Council passed an ordinance reflecting their opinion and asked their attorney to file a motion for the addition. James A. Bradley also stated his displeasure with the Camp Meeting Association on September 18 in a telephone interview with the Asbury Park Evening Press. Noting that he paid $1,500 for the property in original negotiations with the association, he opposed their decision to take the railroad to court.

The motion was sent to Justice Cutler and forced the Camp Meeting Association to prove why the borough should not be a defendant on the case. However, the Camp Meeting Association dropped its lawsuit on October 19, 1919. The stated reason was that the United States Railroad Administration was not made a party to the case. When the testimony was given by Bradley Beach officials to explain why they should be a party, they found a filed discontinuation of the case. The judge stated that because there was no longer a case, he was unsure if he could follow through with their request.

Despite the lawsuit being dropped, the New York and Long Branch Railroad began private negotiations for a transfer of land to the Camp Meeting Association. An official transfer of the square property was agreed to do on October 6, 1920 for $1 and notarized on October 30. The deed was finalized on November 3, 1920. Bradley Beach officials found out about the double transfer of property on December 9 when the Camp Meeting Association offered that the borough could preserve the square for use as a park, but only if the association was paid for the property. If no payment was made, the square would become a business property instead of a municipal park. Bradley Beach officials questioned the legality of the transfer. The association wanted to sell it rather than build on it, but the expectations by locals was that the case would soon return to the courts.

Bradley Beach officials, under instruction of Mayor Frank C. Borden Jr., announced that they felt that the $1,500 payment made by James A. Bradley in May 1893 was dedicated to operate the square under a public purpose. They stated that the borough improved the property and installed the war tribute statue. The Councilors felt that they had right to the property and were not worried about losing title to the square around the station. They instructed their municipal attorney to file a protest against the acquisition by the Camp Meeting Association on December 14. The Borough Solicitor, Ward Kremer, filed his lawsuit in Freehold on December 23 to quiet title of the Camp Meeting Association. Once the association would file a response to the lawsuit, the expectation was that hearings would begin in Chancery Court in February 1921.

In March 1921, it was announced that the trial would be held in Freehold with a jury to decide in the matter. However, an application would be made March 14 to move the case to the New Jersey Supreme Court in Monmouth County's circuit. This process would include an interrogation of Bradley, whose health was failing while living in New York City. The borough won possession of the rights to the square in late May 1921. Afterwards, the municipality spent time working on plans for a Memorial Day celebration in Bradley Beach to welcome visitors.

James A. Bradley died at his home in New York City on June 6, 1921 due to illnesses related to old age at age 91.

=== Fights over closure and name (1937–1938) ===
Neptune Township, asking for help on getting the railroad to pay for repairs of the grade crossing at Corlies Avenue, added in early December 1937 that they desired to have the station name at Bradley Beach changed to "Bradley Beach–Neptune". E.T. Carr, the assistant superintendent, stated that they would consider both requests in the future.

In December 1937, the Central Railroad of New Jersey announced that they were going to eliminate agency works on Sundays at nine of 16 stations on the New York and Long Branch Railroad. At all sixteen stations from South Amboy to Point Pleasant would have workers in all positions get their hours reduced. The order, effective December 27, would close the Bradley Beach station on Sundays and reduce the hours to 5:30 a.m. to 11:30 a.m. and 2:30 p.m. to 4:30 p.m. The railroad's labor union filed a protest on at an emergency basis on December 17 and said the cuts were a violation of the Railway Labor Act. With a meeting with the Board of Public Utility Commissioners coming on February 10, 1938, the borough added their opposition to the railroad's actions and that they would send someone to be represented on January 27. The borough solicitor, Joseph Megill, was ordered to represent the borough at the hearing and statistics were provided for him to use at the hearing to defend full-time agency services at Bradley Beach station. Borden and two of his fellow Borough Council Commissioners would possibly attend the February 10 hearing to help advocate for their sides.

The municipality had a conference with officials of the Central Railroad of New Jersey and Pennsylvania Railroad on February 8, 1938. Commissioner Bernard Poland pushed to help get the railroads to reverse their plans to reduce the agency hours at the station, having provided the agencies the statistics of Bradley Beach in favor of the railroad. The railroads told municipal officials that they would not reduce agency hours at Bradley Beach station and it would not be a focus at the meeting in Newark the next day. The hearing the next day was postponed until February 24.

The railroad rejected the name change by the Neptune Township Committee in March 1938, citing that using more than one name on a station sign was an improper practice. Despite the rejection, the Township Committee restarted their fight to add Neptune to the station name on March 22. Municipal officials noted that three nearby stations shared double names: Asbury Park–Ocean Grove, North Asbury Park–Wanamassa and Avon–Neptune City. The committee requested that the clerk of the township list this in their renewed request to the railroad.

In an April 1938 letter, Edward W. Scheer, the president of the Central Railroad of New Jersey, stated that he personally would analyze the opinions of Neptune Township officials and the railroad and make a decision soon after. At that point he would notify the municipalities involved on their decision. At a meeting on May 10, the township clerk read another letter from Scheer in which he agreed with Neptune officials that they had a right to be signed at the Bradley Beach station.

=== Decline and restoration (1981–1997) ===
With budget cuts coming to rail and bus service due to lowered state and federal subsidies for mass transit in March 1981, the operation of the station depot at Bradley Beach came into question. Municipal officials voted on April 28 to join a petition that would protest closing the ticket office at Bradley Beach station at that point signed by 100 people. They also recommended that residents oppose this to state officials in Trenton. Neptune Township added their opposition in early May, noting that the Asbury Park station ended up being demolished for a municipal building. Neptune Township Mayor Holmes Adams wrote a letter of opposition to the New Jersey Department of Transportation as well, noting that he did it in response to a local petition from residents of Bradley Beach. He opposed the closing of the depot and the fare increase that would come with the cuts.

Despite the addition of extra subsidies from the federal government and state government, NJ Transit's Executive Director Jerome C. Premo stated that they had issues that could not be corrected without multiple fare hikes and cuts. NJ Transit had agreed to increasing rail fares by 50% on January 1, 1982 that would follow an 11% increase on July 1, 1981, when the cuts would take effect. NJ Transit, cutting 17 trains, also announced that they would close 30 station depots, including five on the newly-branded North Jersey Coast Line: Manasquan, Perth Amboy, Allenhurst, Spring Lake and Bradley Beach.

In July 1981, with the station closed, Heritage Studies, Inc. of Princeton did an analysis of the station for inclusion on the National Register of Historic Places as part of a broad study of NJ Transit depots. The station joined the New Jersey Register of Historic Places on March 17, 1984 and the National Register on June 22, 1984.

NJ Transit removed the brick platform at Bradley Beach station, replacing it with an asphalt one in late 1981. By September 1984, the boarded-up station depot had become covered in graffiti.

In February 1987, the deteriorating condition of the station became a prime focus of the borough. Having been in discussions with NJ Transit since 1985 about potential use of the station depot, Mayor Leonard Riley noted that the National Register of Historic Places designation had caused issues in converting the building into a police station. Mayor Riley and his fellow commissioners discussed with NJ Transit that they did not want to lease the station from the agency because of the poor condition and the lack of interest in restoring it. NJ Transit stated that they did not have immediate plans and no funding in the short term to renovate the closed depot. The railroad offered a $1 per year lease, but the borough would have to maintain the depot. The borough recommended that they find a private developer.

In July 1992, Mayor Stephen Schueler invited NJ Transit to inspect the Bradley Beach station for future use and improvements for the area around the depot, which was boarded up and unused. A planning group from New York City affiliated with NJ Transit would come in a few weeks to examine the station in areas such as parking, the streets and the square. At the same time, the Borough Council worked with a firm from Ocean Township to see what they could offer. NJ Transit in 1991 and 1992 had been improving depots to help drive ridership and while the Bradley Beach Historical Society offered to take over the building, Schueler stated that they would probably not attract the ridership that a commercial establishment might. The Borough Council was interested in reinstating ticket service at the station, whether in the form of a ticket vending machine or a ticket agent. The station depot at Bradley Beach closed on an indefinite basis on July 1.

In January 1993, NJ Transit opened a request for inquiries on potential tenants for the Bradley Beach station depot. The station building, 1,200 square feet (110 m^{2}) in size, 2,500 square feet (230 m^{2}) if they enclosed the canopies, was to have at least one or multiple retail businesses in it. NJ Transit, unsure if they were going to renovate the station depot, stated that they would offer leases and terms of renovation for the potential companies. At an open house on January 29, NJ Transit and the borough of Bradley Beach offered an open house to attract businesses. Over 20 businesses attended, where they offered renderings to businesses. Schueler said that the borough was considering two "special improvement districts" to help drive development in Bradley Beach. NJ Transit stated that a renovation of the station depot would cost around $200,000 and that any lease would be at least five years. At least one potential business owner stated that the lack of parking at Bradley Beach station was an obstacle towards construction of a restaurant in the station.

In May 1996, NJ Transit and Schueler announced that restoration work would begin on Bradley Beach station. The restoration work, costing $956,310 would begin that month and intended to be finished by September 1996. Bradley Beach was one of five stations selected for improvements based on a study funded by the Geraldine R. Dodge Foundation and NJ Transit in 1992. The Woodbridge station on the North Jersey Coast Line was also one of the five stations picked. At Bradley Beach, the station parking lot would be repaved, but not expanded. The pavement surrounding the depot would also be removed, but replaced by brick. A new intertrack fence designed by local artists would be installed. Lighting inside and outside the station would be removed and replaced with more contemporary lighting. The boarded-up windows would be removed and replaced with new windows. The depot would be upgraded in accordance with the Americans with Disabilities Act, including the restrooms. Schueler stated that the abatement of asbestos in the station depot would begin on May 22. The parking lot and building renovations, done by Agia Mason Inc. of Bradley Beach, would begin by June.

In January 1997, NJ Transit offered bids on leasing the station depot at Bradley Beach. 225 square feet (20.9 m^{2}) would be used for a rental process, targeting a café or food and newspaper business. NJ Transit and borough officials held a rededication ceremony on June 16, 1997. The new station, featuring a new restaurant called the Back in Time Café, filled the inside of the depot. The renovated depot would have the café at the former ticket window at Bradley Beach station, but no ticket agent was restored, nor was a ticket vending machine installed.

== Station layout and services ==
The Bradley Beach station depot is a one-story red brick structure with a slate roof with a chimney on the southern end of the structure. Each side of the depot has steel canopies, the north one being 40 by 28 feet (12.2 m × 8.5 m). It had a 24-by-20-foot (7.3 m × 6.1 m) waiting room that serves as the home of Back in Time Café. Bradley Beach station contains two low-level asphalt side platforms that run along the border of the borough of Bradley Beach and Neptune Township. Bradley Beach station's northbound platform is located between Brinley Avenue and LaReine Avenue in a small square bordered by Main Street (State Route 71) on the east side of the tracks in the borough. The southbound platform parallels Memorial Drive in Neptune Township between the same two streets and has a pair of bus shelters. The station has a single parking lot of 77 spaces, of which four are accessible for the handicapped. NJ Transit operates the limit on a free basis for all commuters and locals to use. The station has a single ticket vending machine, located on the north side of the station depot. Bicycle facilities are also available.

Bradley Beach station operates on the diesel-only section of the North Jersey Coast Line that operates between Bay Head and Long Branch stations. Some trains go directly on express to New York Penn Station. NJ Transit's 317 bus from Philadelphia, Pennsylvania's 6th and Race Streets bus terminal to Asbury Park station and their 830 bus from Asbury Park to Point Pleasant Beach station operate on Main Street.

== See also ==
- List of New Jersey Transit stations
- National Register of Historic Places listings in Monmouth County, New Jersey
