= Perth Amboy Branch =

Perth Amboy Branch could refer to several former railway lines:

- the Central Railroad of New Jersey's Elizabethport and Perth Amboy Branch
- Conrail's Chemical Coast Secondary, which incorporated the Central Railroad of New Jersey branch
- the Lehigh Valley Railroad's Perth Amboy Branch
- the United New Jersey Railroad and Canal Company's Perth Amboy and Woodbridge Branch
