= Essay Tower =

Coordinates: 40°29′23″N 74°17′3″W

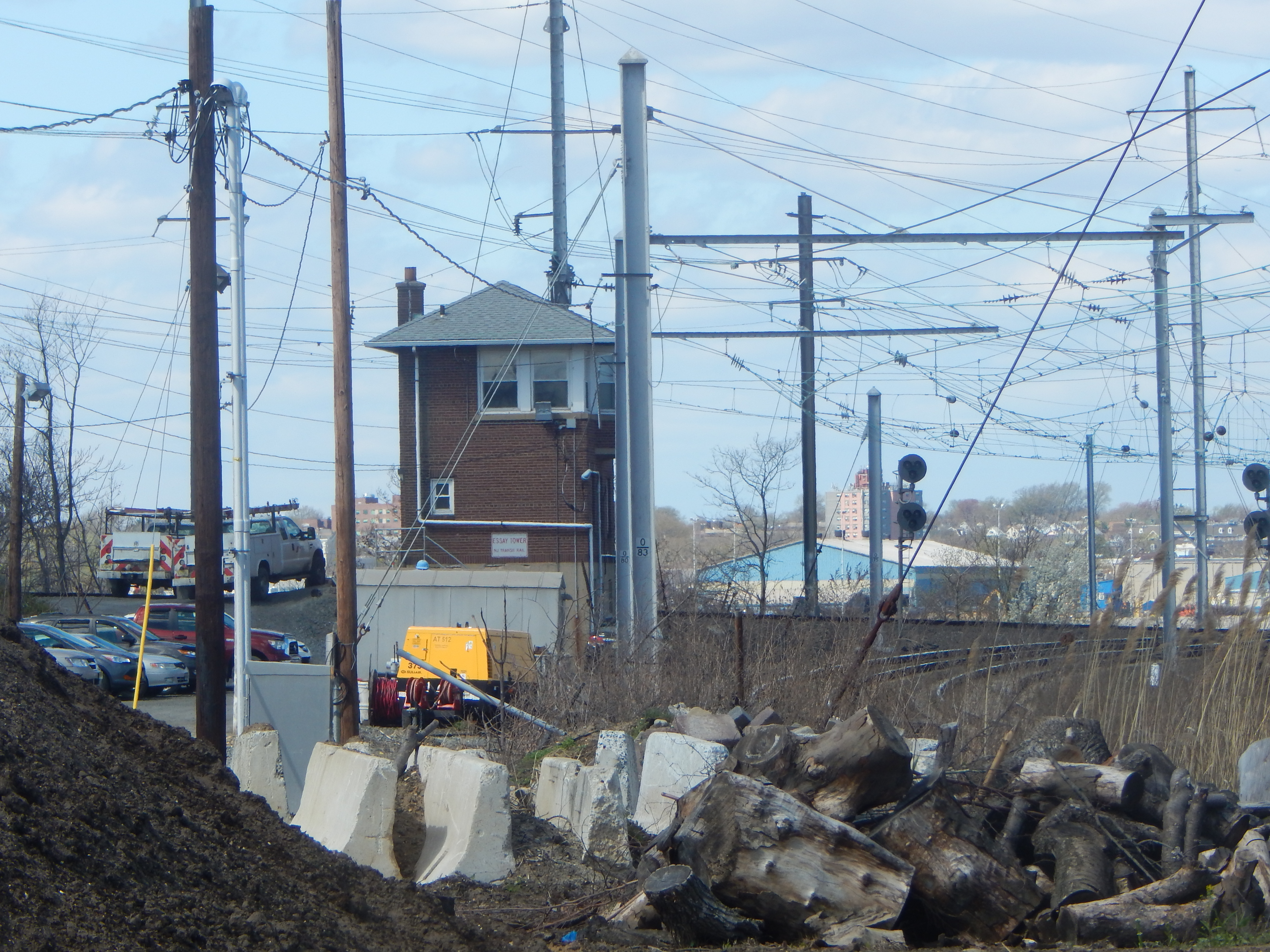
Essay Tower in May 2015

Essay Tower or SA Tower was a former Pennsylvania Railroad interlocking tower in South Amboy, New Jersey.

== History ==
Essay Tower was built by the Pennsylvania Railroad to control traffic coming off the Camden and Amboy Railroad and the Perth Amboy and Woodbridge Railroad. The tower was in later years used to control the South Amboy Engine Facilities for the New York and Long Branch Railroad. Where the electric locomotive was exchanged for a steam locomotive or in later years a diesel-electric locomotive. The tower served through the shortly-lived Penn Central, and then Conrail followed by New Jersey Transit from 1983 on. The tower closed on a warm July 2, 1986, when a GE E60 electric handed train 104 to an EMD F40PH Diesel-Electric Locomotive.

== Current status ==
Essay Tower closed following the electrification to Long Branch, New Jersey and service is now automated.

In 2023, as part of the Raritan Bay Drawbridge replacement project, the tower was demolished to make way for the right of way that will be shifted to the left, thus occupying the land the tower occupied.
