= Union Tower =

Railway interlocking tower in Rahway, New Jersey

Coordinates: 40.60299°N 74.28021°W

Union Tower is a closed interlocking tower on the Pennsylvania Railroad's Northeast Corridor in Rahway, New Jersey.

== History ==
Union Tower was built by the Pennsylvania Railroad (PRR) to control the Perth Amboy and Woodbridge Railroad. Incidentally the PA&W was electrified by the PRR in 1935. For years this interlocking tower on the PRR had controlled trains on the NEC and the PA&W heading either to or from the New York and Long Branch Railroad in South Amboy, New Jersey. In 1968 when the Pennsy merged with the New York Central Railroad to form Penn Central, Union continued to control trains from the PA&W and NEC. In 1976 the government created railroad Conrail assumed operations from Penn Central. While Amtrak handled passenger trains on the NEC. Conrail did commuter and freight operations. Freight however did not get sent onto the North Jersey Coast Line, it stayed on the NEC.

== Today ==
Today, Amtrak Union Tower formerly controlled the NEC and the approaches from the Perth Amboy and Woodbridge Railroad branch (North Jersey Coast Line). It closed in 2011. The traffic it still sees are NJ Transit Rail Operations trains to and from Long Branch, and Amtrak and NJ Transit trains to and from New York City, Trenton and Philadelphia. Amtrak CETC-9 now dispatches the territory formerly controlled by the operator at Union. Three interlockings replaced Union Tower; Roads, Union, and Merck.
