= Asbury Park station =

NJ Transit rail station

Asbury Park
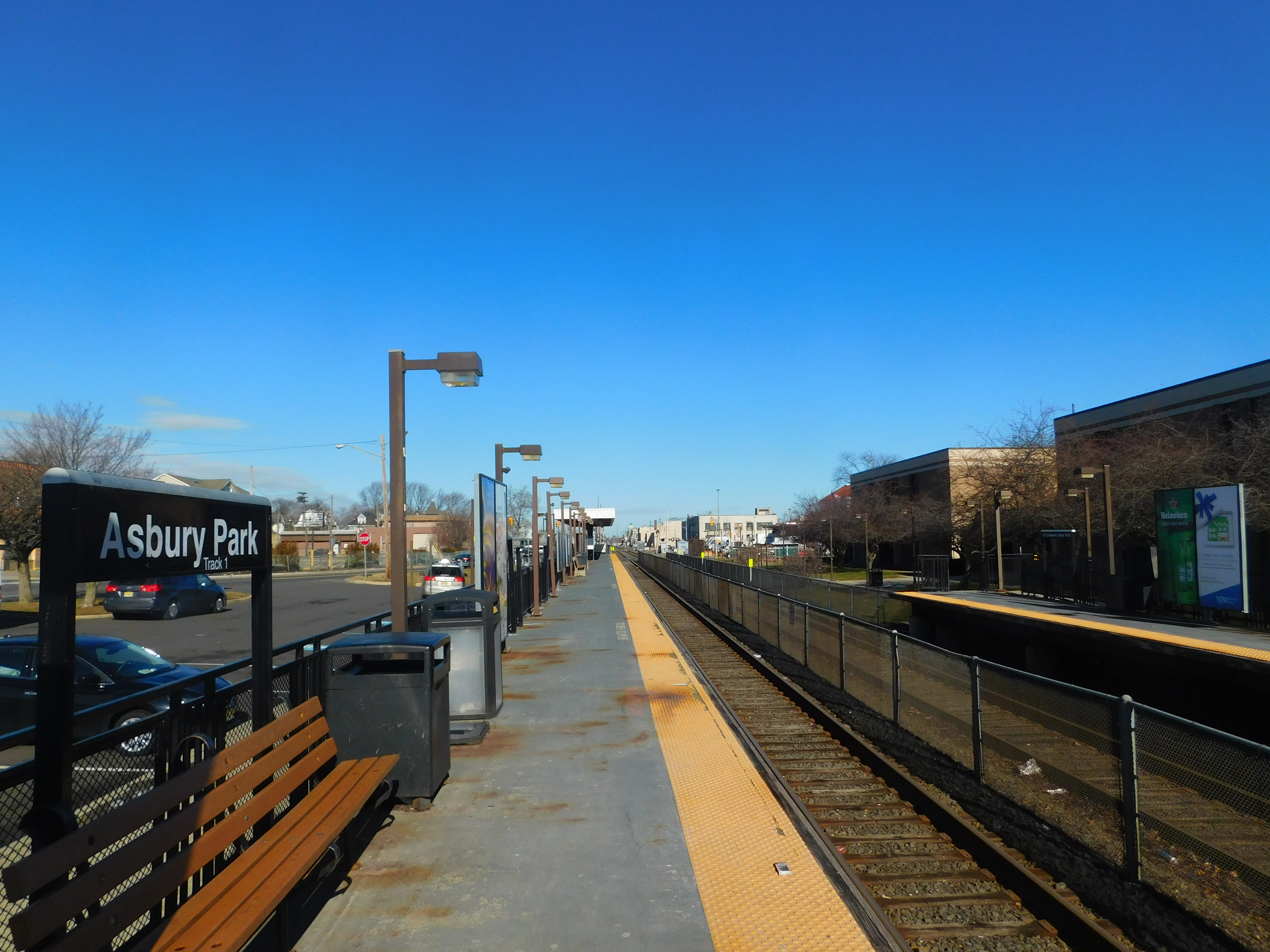
- The Asbury Park station facing northbound in January 2018.

General information
- Location: 111 Main Street, Asbury Park, New Jersey 07712
- Coordinates: 40°12′59″N 74°00′52″W
- Owner: NJ Transit
- Platforms: 2 side platforms
- Tracks: 2
- Connections: NJ Transit Bus: 317, 830, 832, 836, 837; Academy Bus: Shore Points Line

Construction
- Parking: 40 spaces (38 standard, 2 accessible)
- Cycle facilities: Yes
- Accessible: Yes

Other information
- Fare zone: 21

History
- Opened: August 25, 1875
- Rebuilt: February 8–November 2, 1922

Key dates
- March 1978: Station depot razed

Passengers
- 2025: 405 (average weekday)
- Rank: 70 of 153

Services
Preceding station	NJ Transit	Following station
Bradley Beach toward Bay Head	North Jersey Coast Line	Allenhurst toward New York
Former services
Preceding station	New York and Long Branch Railroad	Following station
Bradley Beach toward Bay Head Junction	Main Line	North Asbury Park toward Perth Amboy
Location

Asbury Park is an NJ Transit railway station in Asbury Park, in Monmouth County, New Jersey, United States. It is served by trains on the North Jersey Coast Line. It is located along Cookman Avenue between Main Street and Memorial Drive. The current Asbury Park station is one of two original Asbury Park stations on the line. The North Asbury Park station still exists, but is no longer a station stop; the former station was located at the Sunset Avenue crossing.

== History ==
Railroad service into Asbury Park began in 1875 with the construction of an extension of the New York and Long Branch Railroad (NY&LB), a subsidiary of the Central Railroad of New Jersey and the Pennsylvania Railroad. The NY&LB began as a railroad between Elizabethport (in Elizabeth, Union County) to Long Branch, finished in 1875. The railroad was extended through the city of Asbury Park on August 25. However, the station at Asbury Park was built on land donated by the Ocean Grove Campmeeting Association, a part of the Methodist Church. The new station was built for the purposes of serving both Asbury Park and Ocean Grove. However, the railroad obeyed the request of the Campmeeting Association that trains could not stop within the city of Asbury Park on Sundays due to religious requirements, despite the fact that the Asbury Park–Ocean Grove station produced the most revenue of any station on the line.

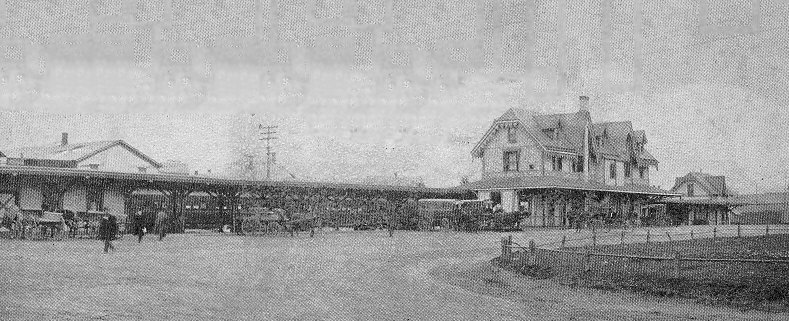
The Asbury Park–Ocean Grove station from a 1908 postcard.

The railroad made an agreement with the Campmeeting Association on May 5, 1883, for the Sunday services. An amendment was made to this deal on June 1, 1889, that kept trains from stopping at North Asbury Park station. This led to the construction of a new station at Interlaken and Loch Arbour. Construction of the new station at Interlaken began in August 1889, with a projected cost of $10,000 (1889 USD). Timber and staking came by August 27. Construction of the station at Interlaken finished and opened in late-June 1890. As a result of the new station at Interlaken, North Asbury Park station was closed by the railroad on November 23, 1890, despite pleas to keep it open. Passengers started using the Asbury Park station instead of the new depot at Interlaken, however. However, a new station opened at North Asbury Park in July 1892 at the cost of $8,000.

A new agreement was signed between the railroad and the Campmeeting Association on August 1, 1904. This allowed Sunday service to begin at North Asbury Park station. The station at North Asbury Park getting Sunday service led to the discontinuance of the Interlaken station. In July 1911, the railroad applied to the Public Service Commission to begin Sunday service at the downtown Asbury Park station. On October 10, 1911, despite pleas from the Campmeeting Association, the commission filed in favor of the railroad, feeling it was not furnishing proper service by forcing trains to skip Asbury Park station on Sundays. The order was to take effect on November 1, 1911. Ocean Grove handed the railroad its rights to the Asbury Park depot and its surrounding land on March 3, 1912.

Construction of a new depot in Asbury Park began on the morning of February 8, 1922. This concluded 40 years of pressuring the New York and Long Branch to build a new depot in the city because the old depot could not handle the amount of traffic coming in and out of Asbury Park. Workers moved all the functions into the south end of the older depot on February 8 to allow for construction to begin. This station depot, a majestic replacement over the original, opened on November 2, 1922. The new depot, of brick and reinforced concrete, cost $200,000 (1922 USD). This new depot was 20 by 30 feet (6.1 m × 9.1 m) large with a grand chandelier in the depot. The depot was symmetrically designed on both sides. A local editorial piece in the Asbury Park Evening Press noted that the city should be proud of the new depot. However, there was still concern that the depot was not large enough to handle the expected amount of business, which proved to be true for several decades after its construction.

As the New York and Long Branch Railroad began to deteriorate due to the advent of the Garden State Parkway, the station deteriorated with it. The railroad painted the depot in 1962. Six ticket windows opened with the station, and eventually it was reduced to just one. Conrail, who took over in 1976, looked to sell off depots. The railroad offered the depot for the city to use. Asbury Park preferred to demolish the station and replace it with a new municipal complex, which would cost $2.3 million. $1.5 million of that total would come from the Economic Development Administration. This new complex would provide new homes for the Asbury Park City Council, the Asbury Park Police Department along with various city offices. The city spent $800,000 for alternative costs along with $50,000 for land acquisition. The Historic Preservations Advisory Council came to protest to the demolition of the 55-year old depot in 1977, citing the historic nature of the depot. They were hoping to get an injunction against the demolition, stating the depot was eligible for listing on the National Register of Historic Places.

However, despite the protests, the city manager signed off in November 1977 to seek bids for demolition. On January 4, 1978, the city approved a contract with Mazza and Sons, Inc. of Oceanport for $10,910 (1978 USD). The station depot would be replaced with a wooden trailer for Conrail employees to sell tickets. Demolition of the old station came in March 1978.
