= Perth Amboy and Elizabethport Railroad =

Map

The Perth Amboy and Elizabethport Railroad was a railroad operated by the Central Railroad of New Jersey (CNJ). It was an independent company when it started construction in 1871, but was taken over by the CNJ in 1873. The railroad diverged from the CNJ main line at Elizabethport and ran to South Amboy, where the New York and Long Branch Railroad (NY&LB) would go on to Bay Head. South of a junction with the Perth Amboy and Woodbridge Railroad in Perth Amboy, the Pennsylvania Railroad had trackage rights to connect with the jointly-controlled NY&LB; this portion was electrified in 1935. When the CNJ terminal in Jersey City closed, CNJ trains would run to Newark where passengers transferred to Pennsylvania Railroad or PATH trains to New York City. Today it is a part of New Jersey Transit's North Jersey Coast Line and Conrail's Chemical Coast Secondary.
