= Hazlet station =

NJ Transit rail station

Hazlet
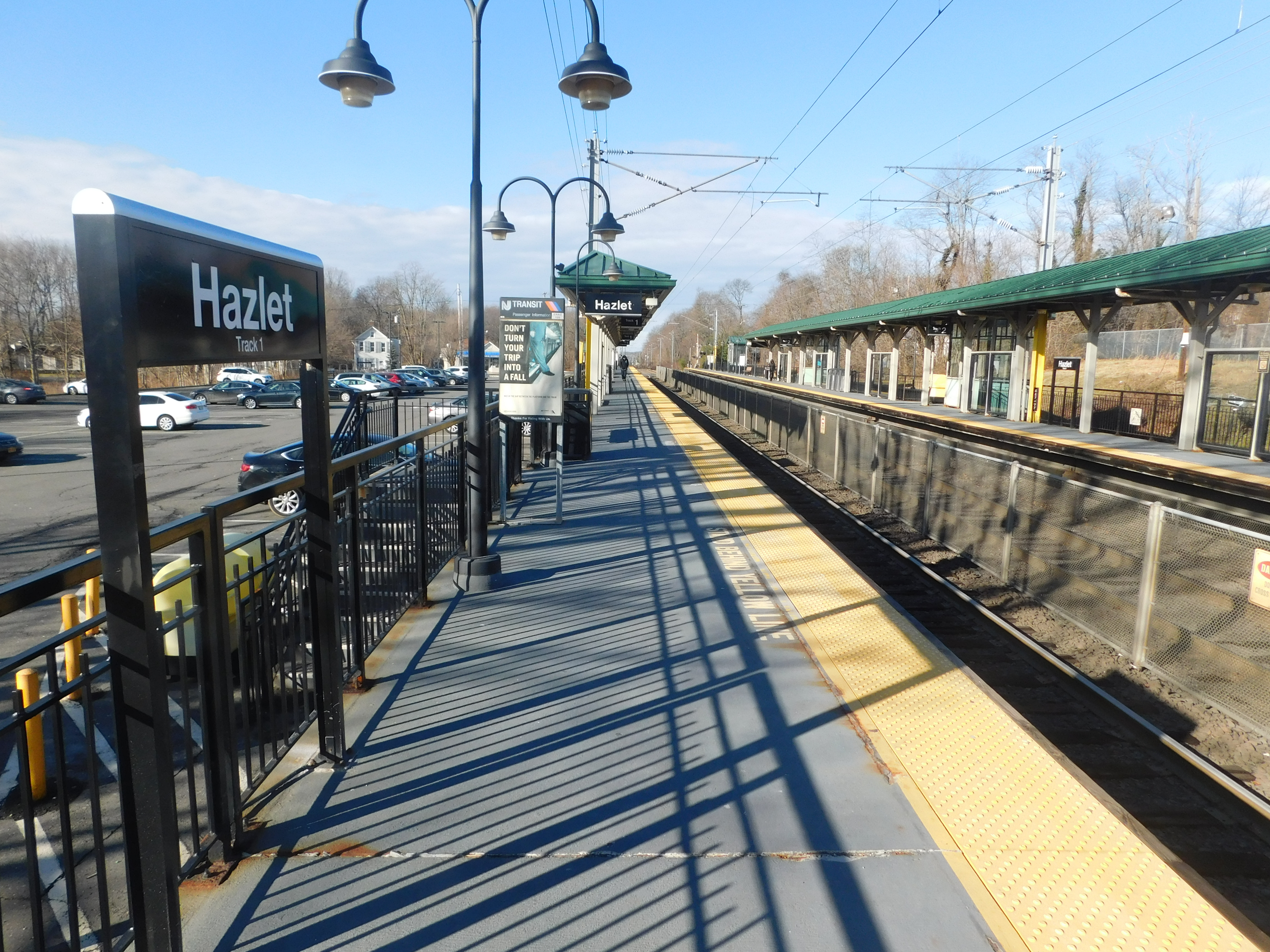
- Hazlet station in January 2018.

General information
- Location: Between Holmdel Road and Hazlet Avenue; Hazlet, New Jersey 07730
- Coordinates: 40°24′55.44″N 74°11′26.60″W
- Owner: NJ Transit
- Platforms: 2 side platforms
- Tracks: 2
- Connections: Academy Bus: PNC Bank Arts Center shuttle

Construction
- Parking: Yes
- Accessible: yes

Other information
- Fare zone: 16

History
- Opened: June 25, 1875 (ceremonial); July 1, 1875 (regular service)
- Rebuilt: 2003
- Former names: Holmdel (1875–1879)

Key dates
- 1952: Agent removed

Passengers
- 2025: 559 (average weekday)
- Rank: 51 of 153

Services
Preceding station	NJ Transit	Following station
Middletown toward Bay Head	North Jersey Coast Line	Aberdeen–Matawan toward New York
Former services
Preceding station	New York and Long Branch Railroad	Following station
Middletown toward Bay Head Junction	Main Line	Matawan toward Perth Amboy
Location

Hazlet is a station on New Jersey Transit's North Jersey Coast Line in Hazlet, Monmouth County, New Jersey. The station is located between a stretch of tracks from Keyport–Holmdel Road (County Route 4) to Hazlet Avenue.

== History ==
Opened as Holmdel, Hazlet station opened in 1875 as part of the New York and Long Branch Railroad, a subsidiary of both the Pennsylvania Railroad and the Central Railroad of New Jersey. The station name changed to Hazlet in 1879 when it was determined to be confusing for the Holmdel in Monmouth County. The station was renamed after John Hazlett, a local settler and property owner. The agency at Hazlet closed in 1952.

The station was rebuilt in 2003, completed on May 27 at a cost of $6.1 million. The refurbishment included two new side high-platforms and new canopies to conform with ADA regulations. The abandoned, historic Vecchi Ketchup Factory chimney at the site of the new station project was dismantled to make way for additional parking spaces.

== Station layout ==
The station has two tracks and two high-level side platforms. The station is compliant with the Americans with Disabilities Act of 1990. The station has three parking lots, with a total of 600 daily and permit parking spaces.
