= Vecchi Ketchup Factory =

Condiment factory in Hazlet, New Jersey

Coordinates: 40°24′55.5″N 74°11′17″W

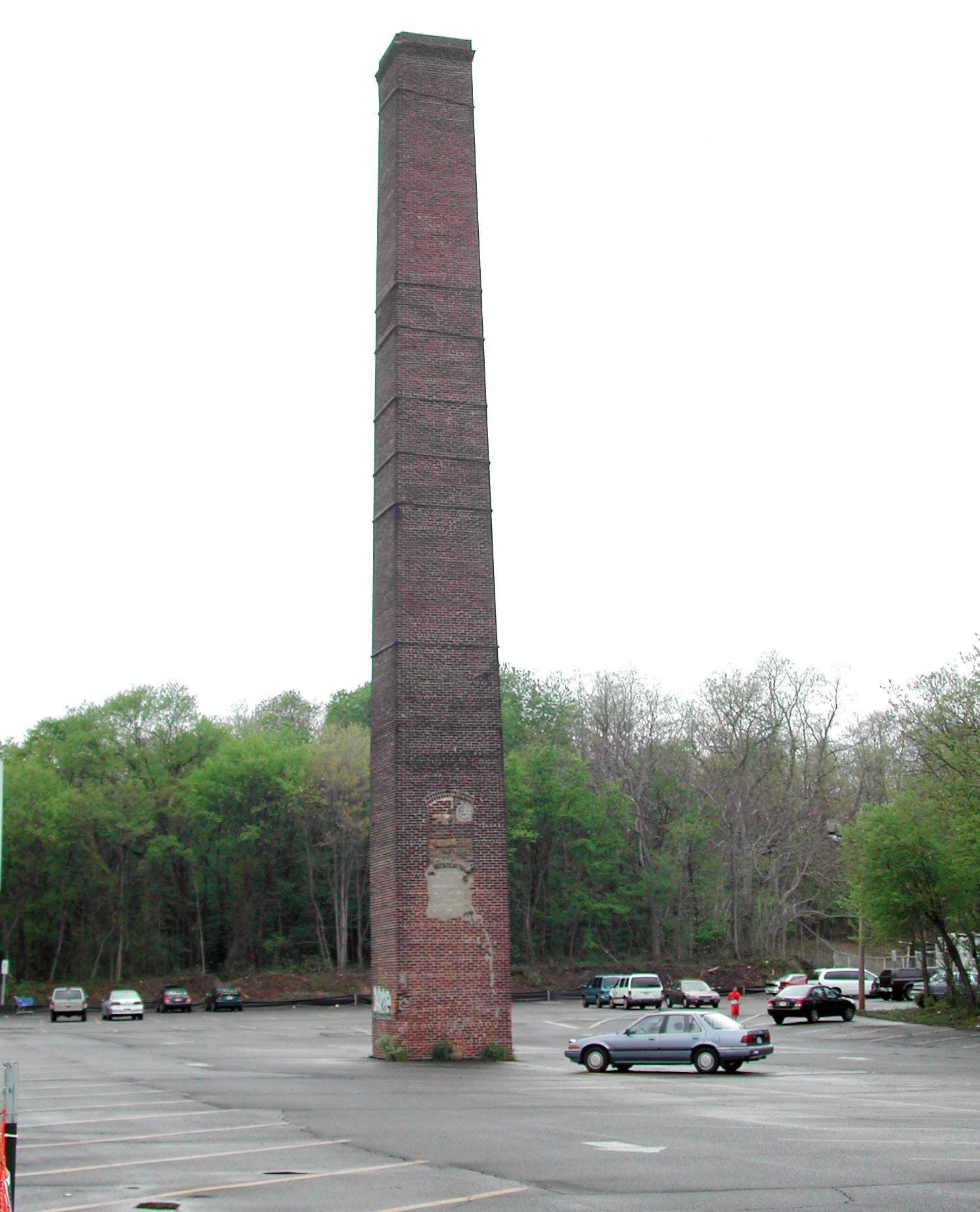
Vecchi Factory chimney as it appeared in 2002

The Vecchi Ketchup Factory in Hazlet, New Jersey produced ketchup from the early 20th century until around 1960. The factory operated in the early 20th century.

Farmers from the area brought their tomatoes to be unloaded from horse-drawn carriages at the factory to make tomato paste, ketchup and canned tomatoes. Apple butter and cider, were made in the fall, although the factory was primarily known as a ketchup factory.

The factory later became a foundry where brass castings were produced before closing around 1960. A fire destroyed much of the abandoned factory in 1963 except for the chimney, which remained until it was demolished for the Hazlet station parking project.

After the chimney's demolition in 2002, bricks from the chimney were sold for $10 each to benefit the township's proposed 9/11 memorial.
