= Middletown station (NJ Transit) =

NJ Transit rail station

Middletown
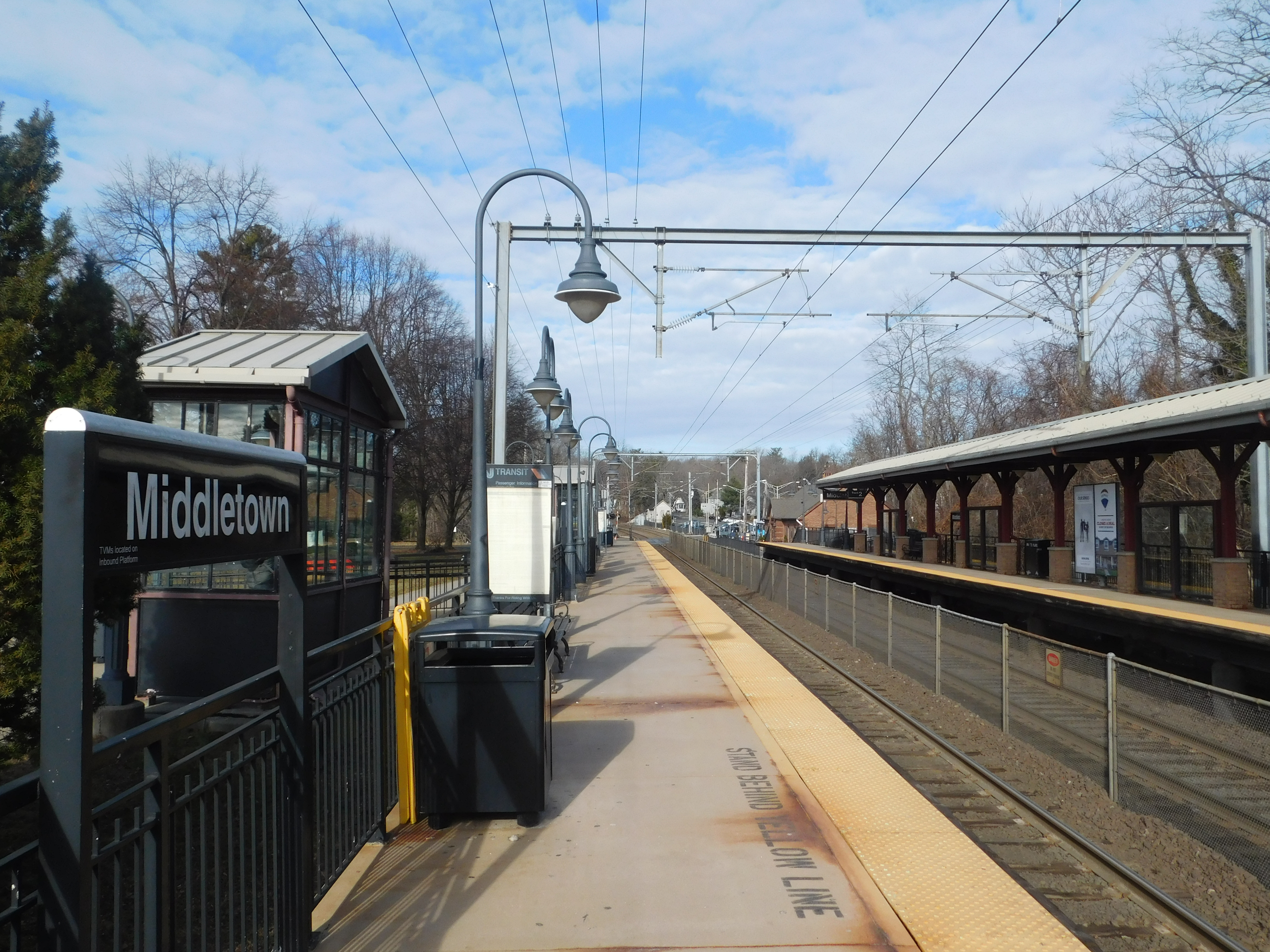
- Middletown station in January 2018.

General information
- Location: Railroad Avenue and Church Street; Middletown Township, New Jersey 07748
- Coordinates: 40°23′21.81″N 74°6′56.54″W
- Owner: NJ Transit
- Line: North Jersey Coast Line
- Platforms: 2 side platforms
- Tracks: 2

Construction
- Parking: Yes
- Cycle facilities: Yes
- Accessible: yes

Other information
- Fare zone: 17

History
- Opened: June 25, 1875 (ceremonial); July 1, 1875 (regular service)
- Rebuilt: August 1983–May 9, 1986
- Electrified: 25 kV 60 Hz

Passengers
- 2025: 679 (average weekday)
- Rank: 40 of 153

Services
Preceding station	NJ Transit	Following station
Red Bank toward Bay Head	North Jersey Coast Line	Hazlet toward New York
Former services
Preceding station	New York and Long Branch Railroad	Following station
Red Bank toward Bay Head Junction	Main Line	Hazlet toward Perth Amboy
Location

Middletown is a passenger railway station for NJ Transit's North Jersey Coast Line in Middletown Township, in Monmouth County, in the U.S. state of New Jersey. Located along both sides of Church Street, the station is the only active station within the township.

== History ==
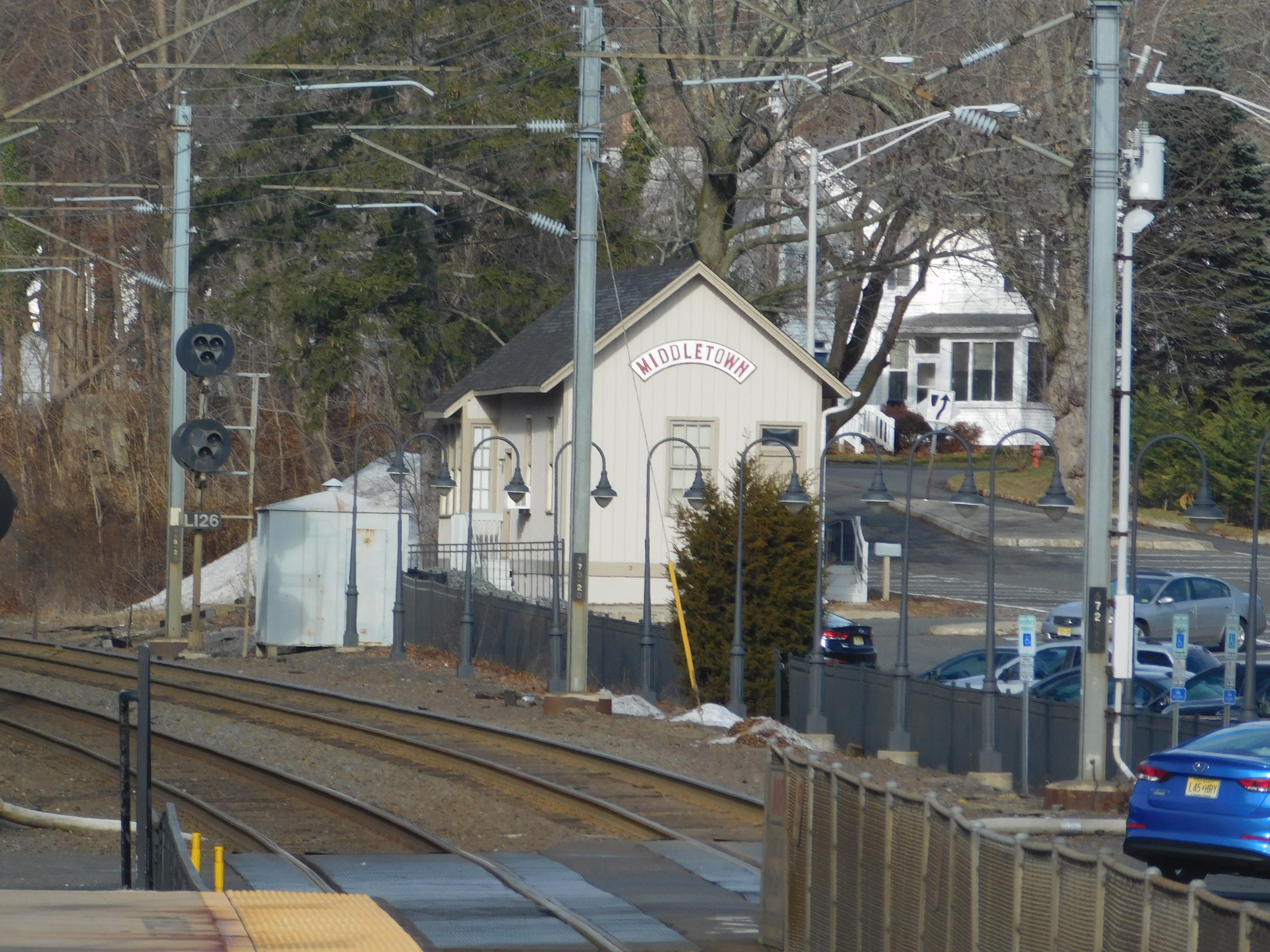
The former New York and Long Branch Railroad station at Middletown.

The station was constructed as part of the New York and Long Branch Railroad, a subsidiary of the Central Railroad of New Jersey and the Pennsylvania Railroad. The site of the current Middletown station was part a farm owned by the Conover family. In 1875, the Conovers sold some of their land for $100 to build the railroad through the area. A new station was built in 1876 for the passenger service.

After years of neglect, the station was repainted and rehabilitated in 1964 with attendance by descendants of the Conovers. The high-level platforms were constructed in 1988 with the beginning of electric service down to Long Branch from South Amboy. The former depot stands at the edge of the parking lot on Conover Avenue.

== Station layout ==
The station has two tracks, and two high-level side platforms that are eight cars long. The station has 1,616 parking spaces in two lots that are owned by Middletown Township.
