= Allenhurst station =

NJ Transit rail station

Allenhurst
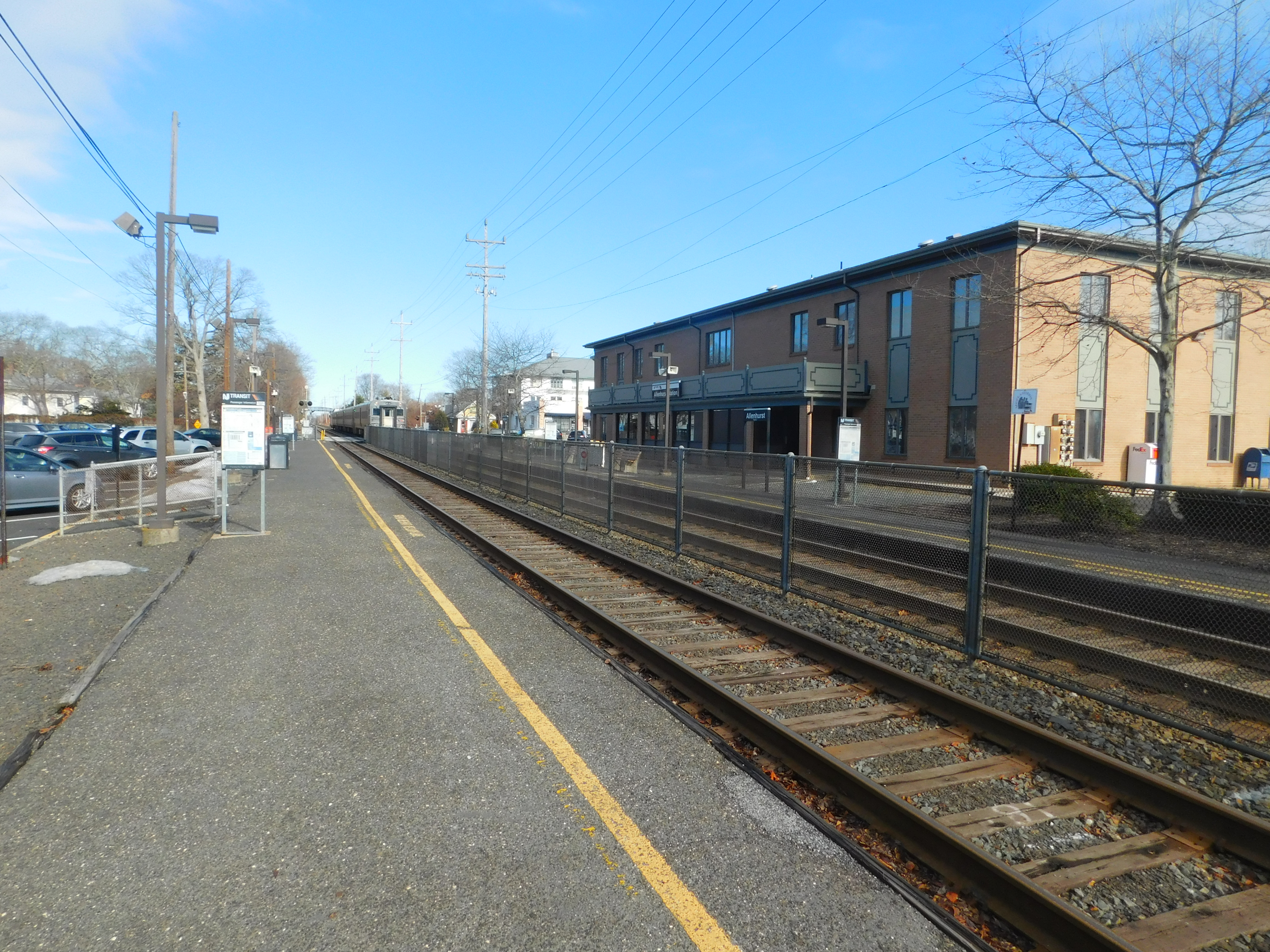
- Allenhurst station facing northbound in January 2018. A Bay Head shuttle to Long Branch is departing.

General information
- Location: 201 Main Street; Allenhurst, New Jersey 07711
- Owner: NJ Transit
- Platforms: 2 side platforms
- Tracks: 2

Construction
- Parking: 89 spaces (89 standard, 0 accessible)
- Accessible: No

Other information
- Fare zone: 21

History
- Opened: May 17, 1897
- Rebuilt: 1983

Key dates
- July 1, 1981: Station agent eliminated
- April 13, 1982: Station depot razed

Passengers
- 2025: 93 (average weekday)
- Rank: 121 of 153

Services
Preceding station	NJ Transit	Following station
Asbury Park toward Bay Head	North Jersey Coast Line	Elberon toward New York
Former services
Preceding station	New York and Long Branch Railroad	Following station
North Asbury Park toward Bay Head Junction	Main Line	Deal toward Perth Amboy
- Allenhurst Railroad Station
- U.S. National Register of Historic Places
- Interactive map of Allenhurst Railroad Station
- Location: Main St., Allenhurst, New Jersey
- Coordinates: 40°14′14″N 74°0′25″W
- Area: 0.4 acres (0.16 ha)
- Built: 1897
- Architectural style: Queen Anne, Neo-Classical
- NRHP reference No.: 80002504
- Added to NRHP: September 17, 1980
Location

Allenhurst is an active commuter railroad station in Allenhurst, Monmouth County, New Jersey. Served by New Jersey Transit's North Jersey Coast Line, Allenhurst station operates on the diesel-only segment between Bay Head and Long Branch stations. Trains also operate to both New York Penn Station and Hoboken Terminal. The next station to the north is Elberon in Long Branch while the next station to the south is Asbury Park. Allenhurst station consists of two low-level side platforms that are not handicapped accessible.

== History ==
Allenhurst station opened on May 17, 1897, as a replacement for the Interlaken station on the New York and Long Branch Railroad, a joint operation between the Central Railroad of New Jersey and Pennsylvania Railroad. As part of opening, Interlaken station became a Sunday-only stop on the railroad until its closure on July 31, 1904. The station joined the National Register of Historic Places in August 1980, despite the poor condition of the station depot. New Jersey Transit eliminated agent services at the station on July 1, 1981. However, the owner razed the wooden station depot on April 13, 1982. The station has been listed on the National Register of Historic Places since 1980, despite being demolished.

== See also ==
- National Register of Historic Places listings in Monmouth County, New Jersey
