= Edward W. Scheer =

American railroad executive (1875–1949)

Edward Waldemar Scheer
- Edward (pictured fifth from the left) at the Railway Labor Management Conference in 1942.
- Born: April 28, 1875; Zaleski, Ohio, U.S.
- Died: June 16, 1949 (aged 74); District of Columbia, U.S.
- Resting place: West Laurel Hill Cemetery
- Occupation: President of the Reading Company

Edward Waldemar Scheer (April 28, 1875 – June 16, 1949) was the President of the Reading Company from 1935 to 1944.

== Career ==
In 1890, Scheer began work as a messenger boy for Baltimore and Ohio Railroad. He slowly worked his way up the company from clerk to vice president of the Reading Company and then became president of the Central Railroad of New Jersey. He succeeded Ewing when he died in 1935. He was a member of the Railway Labour Management Conference and attended many meetings. Scheer pushed unification with the Baltimore and Ohio Railroad and made it one of his goals during his presidency of the company.

He played a major role in removing some of the company's interest charges.

== Death ==
Scheer died on June 16, 1949, after being in the railroad field for more than 54 years.
