= Perth Amboy and Woodbridge Railroad =

Overview
- Dates of operation: 1855–1958
- Successor: United New Jersey Railroad and Canal Company

Technical
- Track gauge: 1,435 mm (4 ft 8 1/2 in)
- Length: 6.33 miles (10.19 km)
- No. of tracks: 2

The Perth Amboy and Woodbridge Railroad was a railroad company in the state of New Jersey. It was incorporated in 1855, and completed its line between Rahway and Perth Amboy, New Jersey, in 1864. The company became part of the Pennsylvania Railroad system and was merged into the United New Jersey Railroad and Canal Company in 1958. Its line is part of the New Jersey Transit's North Jersey Coast Line.

== History ==
The Perth Amboy and Woodbridge Railroad was incorporated on March 9, 1855, and opened its 6.33-mile (10.19 km) line on October 11, 1864. The line diverged from the New Jersey Rail Road and Transportation Company's main line at Rahway, New Jersey (at the future location of Union Tower), and ran south through Woodbridge to South Amboy, New Jersey (at Essay Tower), on the Camden and Amboy Railroad. The New Jersey Rail Road leased the company on completion; the Pennsylvania Railroad assumed the lease in 1871 when the New Jersey Rail Road, Camden and Amboy, and Delaware and Raritan Canal Company were consolidated to form the United New Jersey Railroad and Canal Company.

The line was double-tracked in 1886–1887. In 1891, the Perth Amboy and Woodbridge Railroad was consolidated with the Perth Amboy and Long Branch Railroad; the new company kept the name Perth Amboy and Woodbridge Railroad. The Pennsylvania Railroad merged the Perth Amboy and Woodbridge Railroad into the United New Jersey Railroad and Canal Company in 1958. The line was electrified in 1935. On Penn Central Transportation's bankruptcy in 1976, the Perth Amboy and Woodbridge Branch was conveyed to Conrail. The New Jersey Department of Transportation acquired the line, along with most other properties hosting commuter rail, in 1978.

== Today ==
Today this line is part of New Jersey Transit's North Jersey Coast Line, which operates into New York's Pennsylvania Station. This line is controlled by the NJ Transit North Jersey Coast Line dispatcher from Graw interlocking (inclusive), to the west. Amtrak CETC-9 controls from Graw (exclusive) east into Amtrak's Union Interlocking. Between Perth Amboy, New Jersey and South Amboy, New Jersey the main line crosses the Raritan Bay Drawbridge over the Raritan River.
