= Raritan Bay Drawbridge =

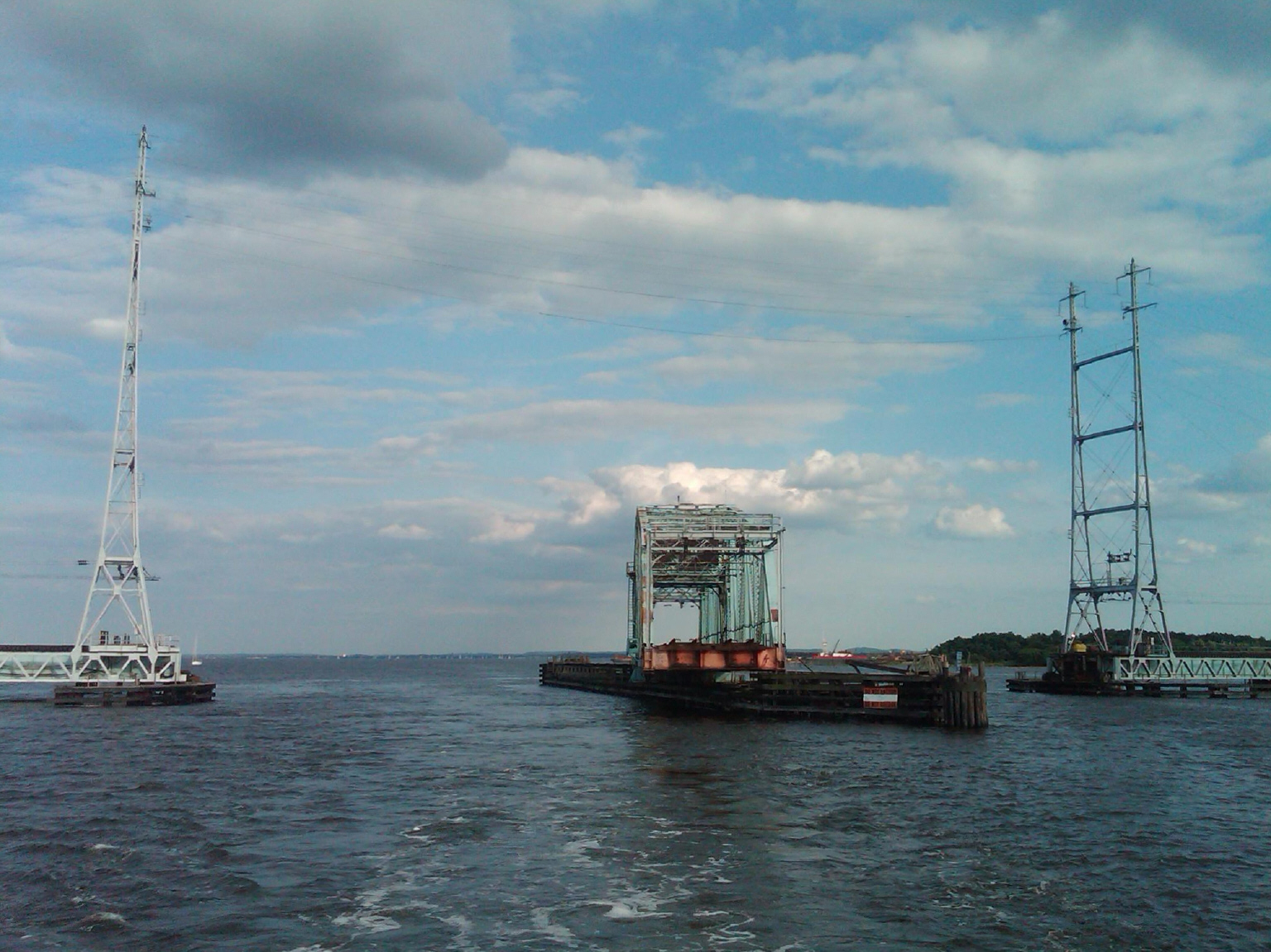
- In the open position in early summer 2011
- Coordinates: 40.496°N 74.281°W
- Carries: New York and Long Branch (to 1976); Conrail; North Jersey Coast Line
- Crosses: Raritan River
- Locale: Perth Amboy and South Amboy, Middlesex County, New Jersey
- Other name: River Draw
- Owner: New Jersey Transit
- ID number: NJT 400

Characteristics
- Design: Swing bridge
- Longest span: 331 feet (101 m)
- No. of spans: 30

Rail characteristics
- No. of tracks: 2
- Electrified: 12 kV 25 Hz

History
- Constructed by: Pennsylvania Steel Company; McCullen and McDermott
- Construction end: 1908

Location
- Interactive map of Raritan Bay Drawbridge

The Raritan Bay Drawbridge, also known as River-Draw, Raritan Bay Swing Bridge, and Raritan River Railroad Bridge, is a railroad swing bridge crossing the Raritan River 0.5 miles (0.8 km) from where it empties into the Raritan Bay in Middlesex County, New Jersey, United States. It crosses the city line of Perth Amboy to the north and South Amboy to the south.

== History ==
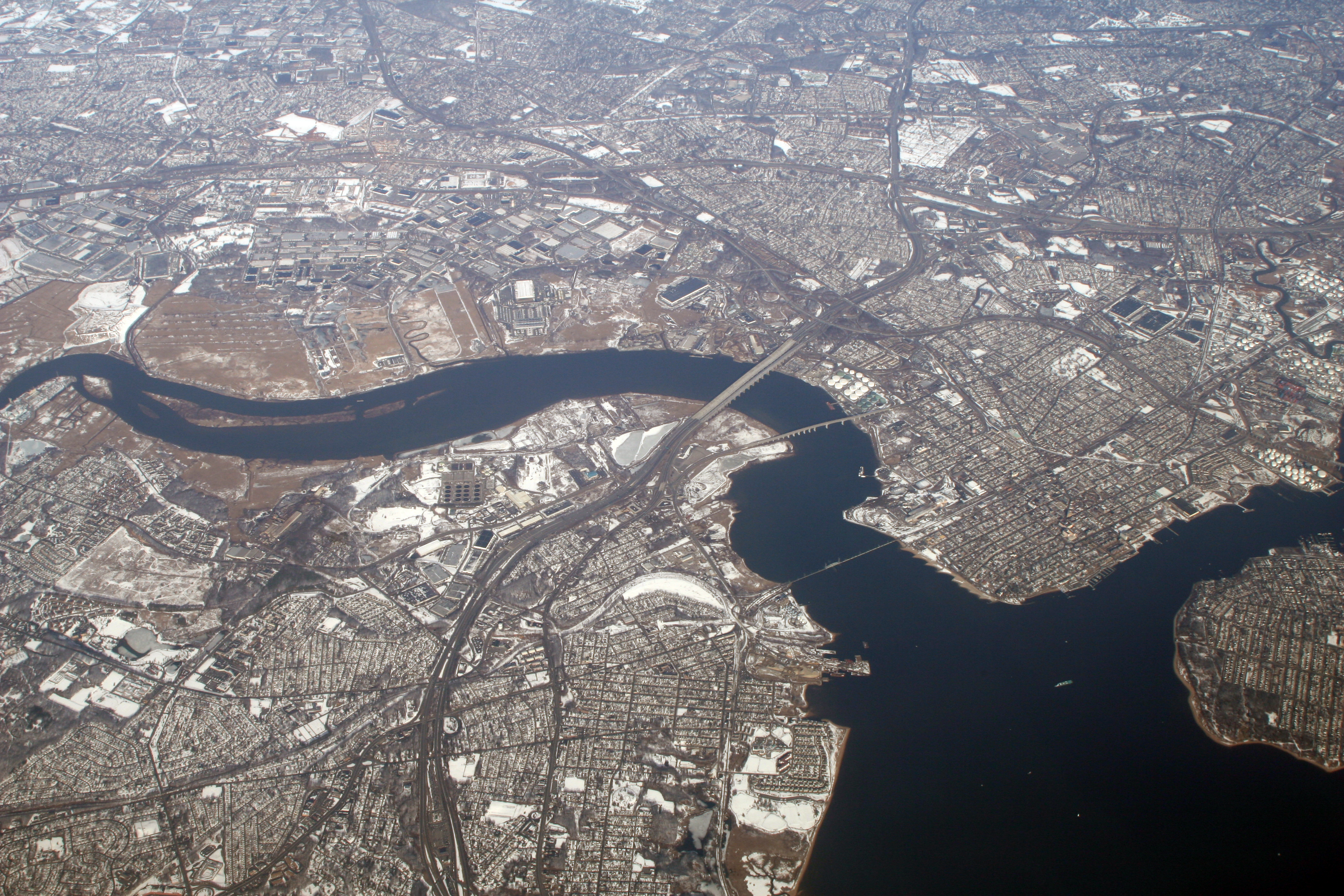
Aerial view of bridges where the Raritan River enters Raritan Bay; the rail bridge is the rightmost one

The bridge was built in 1908 to replace one that had been built at the crossing in 1875 to serve the New York and Long Branch Railroad, jointly operated by the Central Railroad of New Jersey (CNJ) and Pennsylvania Railroad (PRR). Near the end of its construction, the bridge was sabotaged by a dynamite blast. A few years after completion, the bridge was damaged in a severe winter storm. The bridge has been owned by several different parties since the CNJ/PRR era: Penn Central (1968–1971), the New Jersey Department of Transportation (to 1983), and New Jersey Transit (NJT).

== Operations ==
The bridge is used by NJT commuter rail on its North Jersey Coast Line and for Conrail-Norfolk Southern rail freight operations. Federal regulations require the bridge to be open on signal except during rush hour or when a train has passed the home signal for it.

== Replacement ==
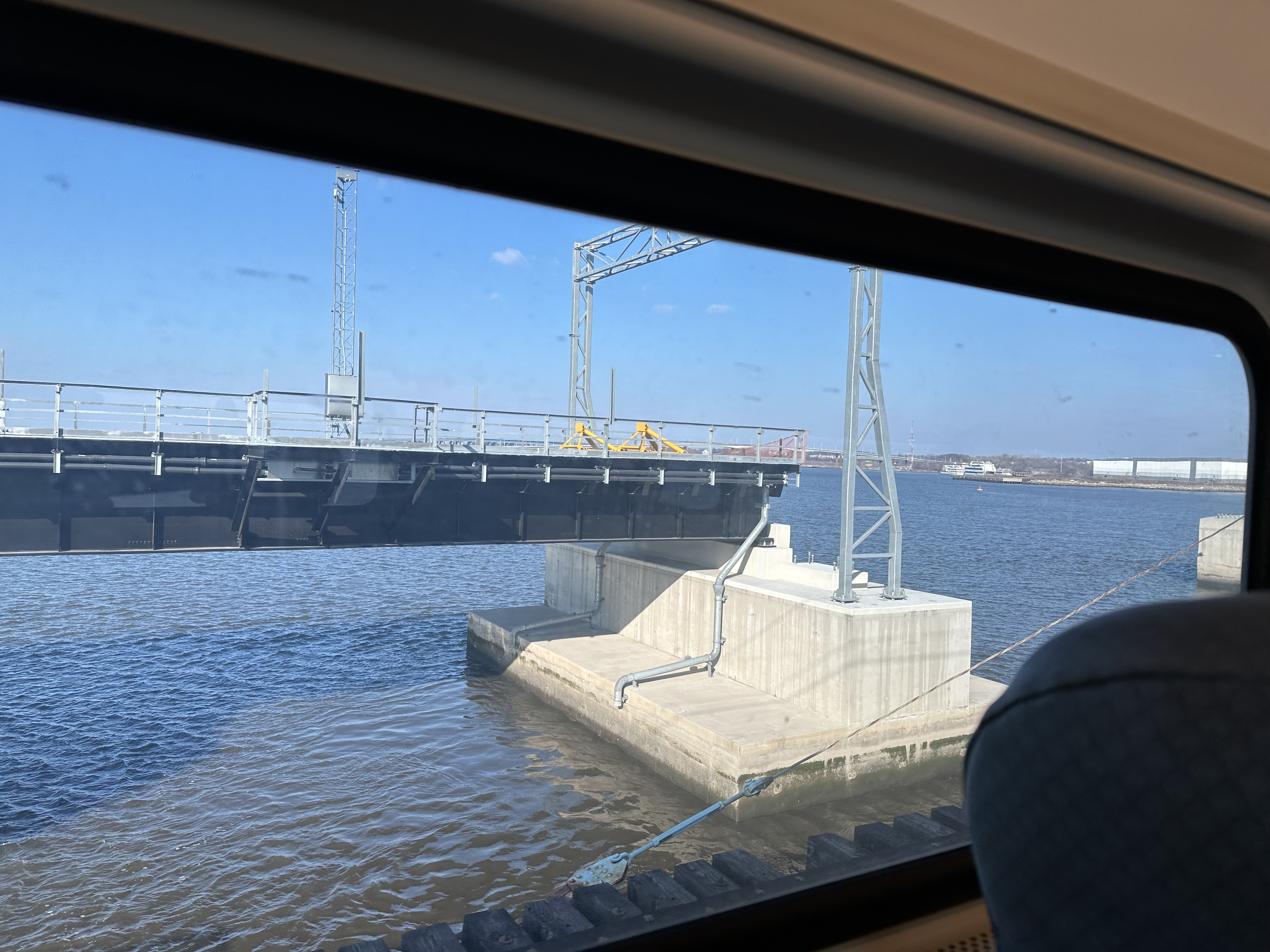
Portion of the new bridge under construction, as seen in January 2025 from a train on the existing bridge

The bridge was scheduled to be replaced after suffering structural damage from Hurricane Sandy in 2012. The bridge was overwashed by the storm surge, struck by two tugboats, and had to be realigned before low-speed service could resume a month later. A $446 million federal grant, announced in 2014, will fund construction of a new bridge while trains continue using the existing bridge.

A groundbreaking ceremony for the approaches to the new was held September 15, 2020, with completion projected for 2026.

An additional groundbreaking ceremony was held on June 24, 2025 for the center lift span of the new bridge.

== See also ==
- List of crossings of the Raritan River
- NJT movable bridges
