= New York and Long Branch Railroad =

New Jersey commuter train

Overview
- Reporting mark: NYLB
- Locale: Perth Amboy, NJ to Bay Head, NJ
- Dates of operation: 1875–1976
- Successor: Conrail

Technical
- Track gauge: 4 ft 8 1/2 in (1,435 mm) standard gauge

The New York and Long Branch Railroad (reporting mark NYLB) was a railroad in central New Jersey, running from Bay Head Junction in Bay Head to Perth Amboy, where it connected to the Central Railroad of New Jersey's Perth Amboy and Elizabethport Railroad. The railroad was jointly owned and operated by the Pennsylvania Railroad and the Central Railroad of New Jersey and became property of Conrail in 1976. It is now part of New Jersey Transit's North Jersey Coast Line.

== Connections ==
The railroad had the following connections to others, from north to south:

- Perth Amboy and Elizabethport Railroad (CNJ) at Perth Amboy (PRR had trackage rights north to the PRR's Perth Amboy and Woodbridge Railroad)
- United New Jersey Railroad and Canal Company (PRR) at PRR Crossing South Amboy
- Raritan River Railroad at South Amboy
- Freehold and Atlantic Highlands Railroad (CNJ) at Matawan
- New Jersey Southern Railroad (CNJ) at Red Bank
- Monmouth Park Railroad at Oceanport
- New Jersey Southern Railroad (CNJ) at Branchport
- West End Railroad (CNJ) at West End
- Freehold and Jamesburg Agricultural Railroad (PRR) at Sea Girt
- Pennsylvania and Atlantic Railroad (PRR) at Bay Head Junction (CNJ trains turned around at a loop)

== History ==
The company was incorporated on April 8, 1868; its line from Perth Amboy to Long Branch was built in 1875. On December 20, 1881 the following companies were merged into it, listed from north to south:

- New Egypt and Farmingdale Railroad (inc. March 17, 1869, built 1876 from Long Branch to Belmar and the rest of the line to New Egypt never built)
- Long Branch and Sea Girt Railroad (inc. June 18, 1875, built 1876 from Belmar to Sea Girt)
- New York and Long Branch Extension Railroad (inc. March 10, 1880, built 1880 from Sea Girt to Point Pleasant)
- Long Branch and Barnegat Bay Railroad (inc. September 23, 1880, built 1881 from Point Pleasant to Bay Head Junction)

At first, the railroad was leased by the CNJ; the PRR had plans for a parallel Perth Amboy and Long Branch Railroad. A January 3, 1882 agreement split the property between the CNJ and PRR, with trackage rights for each over the whole line. When Penn Central (the PRR's successor) and the CNJ merged into Conrail in 1976, the railroad was finally under control of one company. It is now part of New Jersey Transit's North Jersey Coast Line (NJCL)

== Stations ==
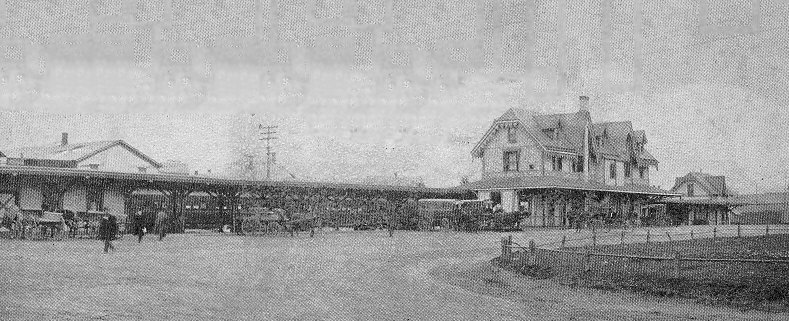
Asbury Park – Ocean Grove station of the NY&LB Railroad in 1908

New York and Long Branch Railroad Stations (From N to S)
Milepost	Name
38.6	Perth Amboy
37.1	P.R.R. Crossing/SA/Essay Tower
36.6	South Amboy
32.6	Cliffwood
31.4	Matawan
29.6	Hazlet
25.0	Middletown
21.6	Red Bank
19.3	Little Silver
16.8	Branchport
15.7	Long Branch
15.0	Hollywood and West End
13.4	Elberon
12.0	Deal Beach
11.5	Interlaken
	North Asbury Park
10.0	Ocean Grove and Asbury Park
8.1	Avon and Key East
7.4	Belmar and Ocean Beach
	Como
5.4	Spring Lake
3.9	Sea Girt
3.1	Manasquan
2.5	Brielle
1.1	Point Pleasant
0.0	Bay Head Junction

== See also ==
- Raritan Bay Drawbridge
