= Huber Woods Park =

County park in Monmouth County, Middletown Township, New Jersey

Huber woods Park
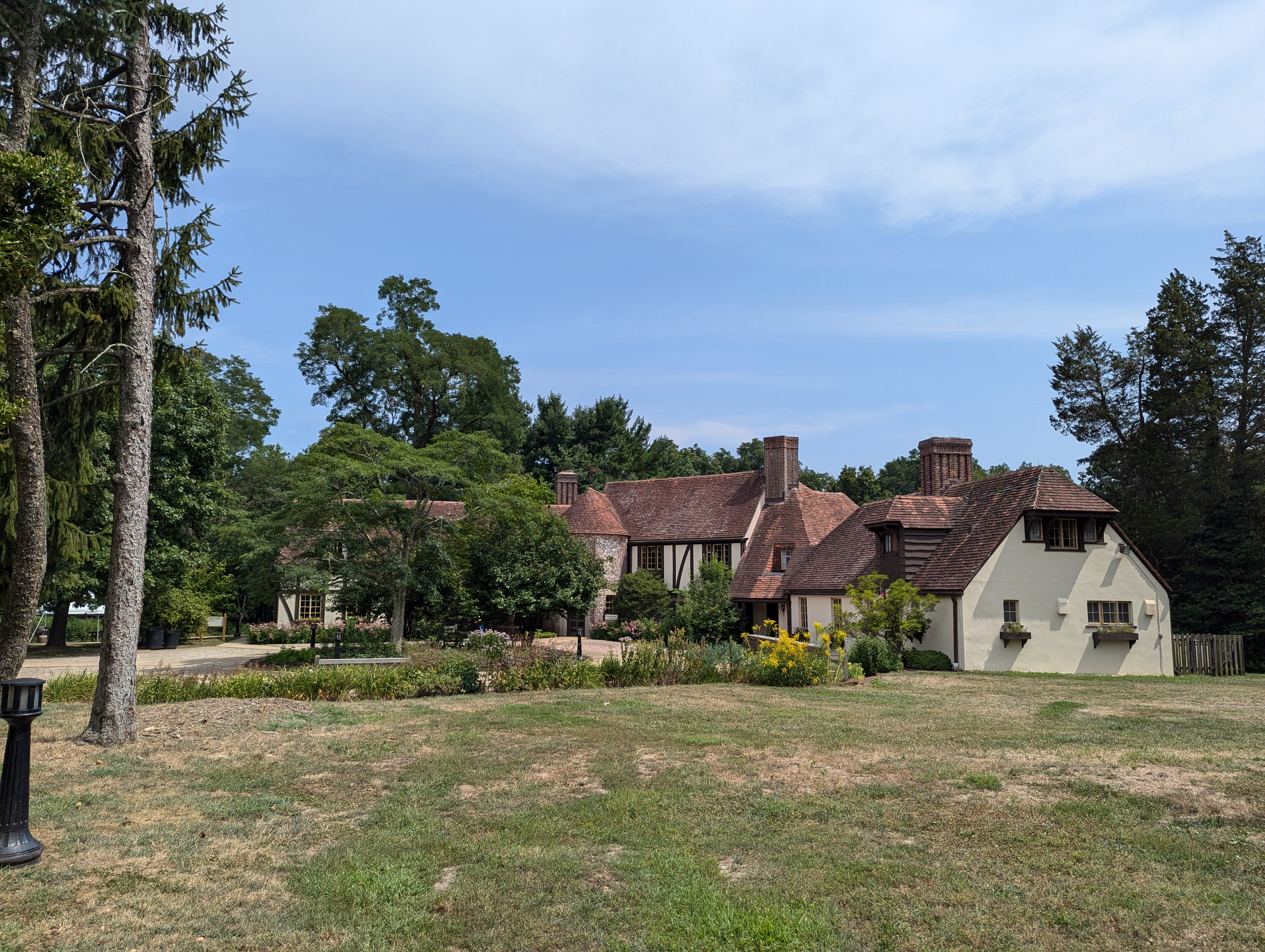
- The park's Environmental Center, formerly the H.W. Huber House

- Location within Monmouth County, New Jersey Location within New Jersey Location within the United States
- Type: Passive park
- Location: Middletown Township, New Jersey, United States
- Coordinates: 40.383973°N 74.035058°W
- Area: 390 acres (1.6 km^{2})
- Created: 1974
- Owner: Monmouth County
- Operator: Monmouth County Park System
- Visitors: 114,781 (2021)
- Open: 7 AM to dusk
- Status: Open all year
- Hiking trails: 9
- Habitats: Mixed Oak Forest
- Website: www.monmouthcountyparks.com

Huber Woods Park is a county park located in the community of Locust, Middletown Township, New Jersey. The 390-acre (160 ha) park, run by the Monmouth County Park System is situated in the Navesink Highlands and is primarily made up of preserved woodland and farmlands formerly owned by the Huber family. The park is often used for hiking, birdwatching and horseback riding and features an environmental center, housed in the former Huber family residence, a reptile house, and an equestrian area.

== History ==
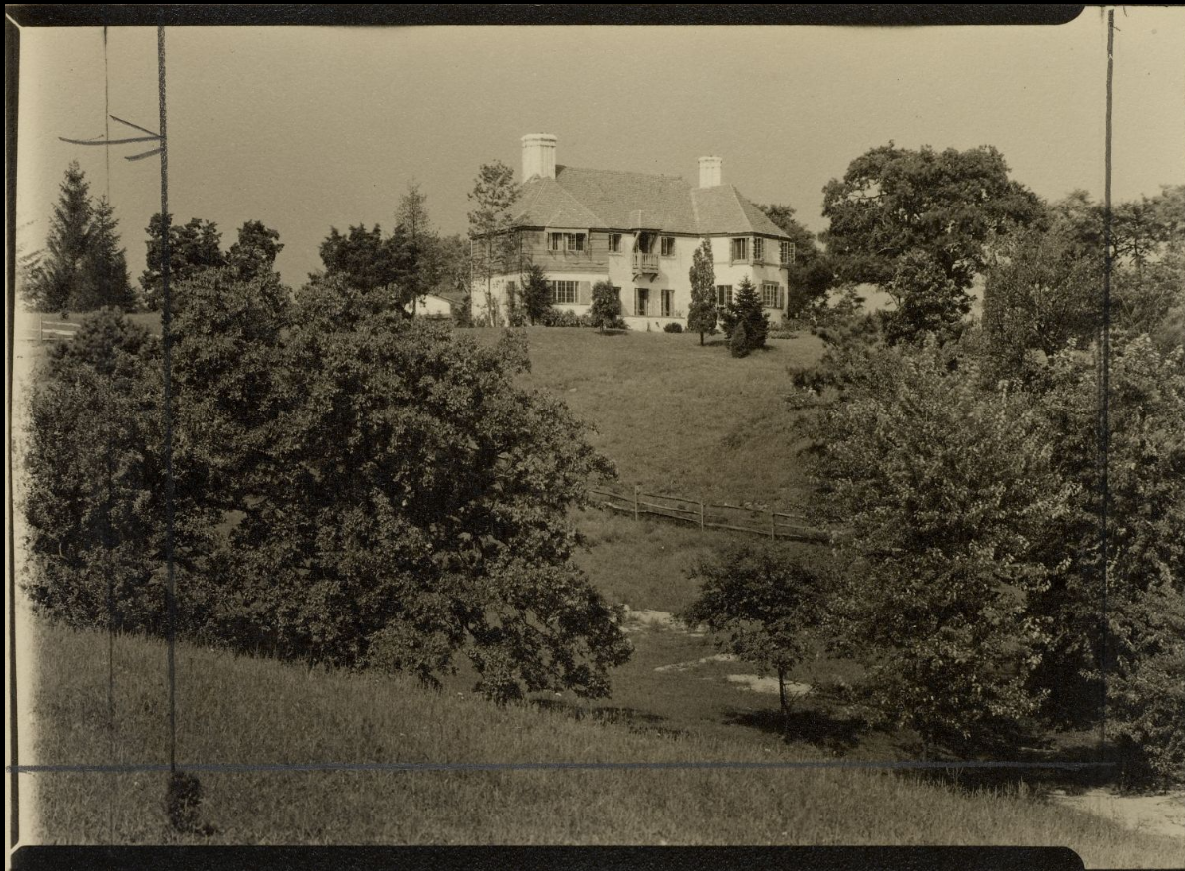
The H.W. Huber house sometime after 1927.

Just prior to European settlement, Middletown Township and the land which made up the park was inhabited by the Lenape Navesink people. The land was purchased by European settlers in 1664 and farms existed by the early 18th century. One of these early farms, owned by the Brown family, became the namesake of Browns' Dock Road, a dirt road which runs through the park today.

By the early 20th century, Locust had become a fashionable summer colony for the upper-class. One of these families was the family of Joseph Huber, a German immigrant who founded the J.M. Huber Corporation, which originally sold pigments. The Hubers rented the Brown family farm in 1904, and purchased the property outright in 1915. Joseph's son, Hans Huber and his wife Catherine Huber decided to build their home on the property as well, building the H.W. Huber house, an Alpine-style house in 1927 designed by architects William Frenaye and Edwin Howard. The Huber family would spend summers at the house, farming the land and raising horses, cows and chickens.

In 1974, Hans and Catherine Huber decided to donate 119 acres of their property to the Monmouth County Park System. They placed several covenants with their donation, including that Brown's Dock Road shall not be widened or paved, and that the land be preserved as a nature sanctuary. Further acquisitions during the 1970s added 84 acres to the park. After Hans and Catherine Huber's death in 1985, the Huber family decided to donate an additional 48 acres which included the H.W. Huber house, a barn and stable complex, fields and woodlands.

Since the Huber families' ownership, the park system has converted the H.W. Huber house into an environmental center, and built a discovery trail around the residence. in 1987, the park system moved SPUR—Special People United to Ride a threptic riding program to the park from Thompson Park, and in 1994 erected an Activity Building next to the environmental center to conduct educational programs. The last expansion of the park happened in 2006, when the 99 acre Timolat Farm was purchased by the Monmouth Conservation Foundation. The garage of the Huber house, which was turned into a reptile center during the 1990s, was renovated in 2019.

== Description ==
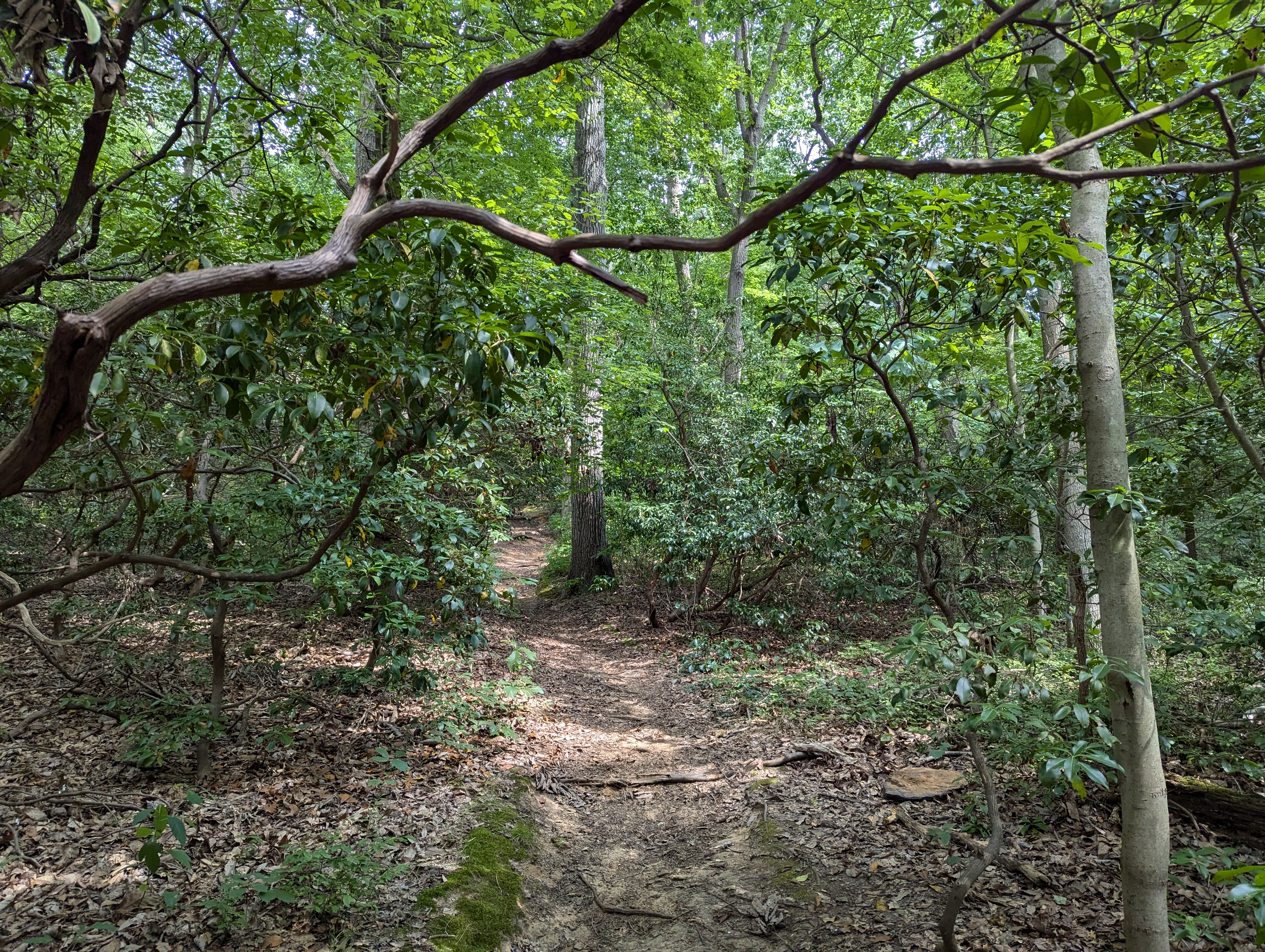
Oak forest on the Nature Loop in Huber Woods Park.

The park is situated on a cuesta ridge in the Navesink Highlands, and consists of rolling pasture and woodlands. Although the park in the past was equally divided between pasture and woodlands, today the park is rewilding, and four-fifths of the park has reverted to woodland. The more mature woodlands, primarily consisting of mixed oak forest, resembles the forests of Hartshorne Woods Park and consist of oaks and some remnant American chestnut, with an understory of mountain laurel. Norway Spurce planted by the Huber family grows near the environmental center. Animals such as the red fox and pileated woodpeckers may be seen in the park, as well as raptors such as the bald eagle.

== Activities and facilities ==
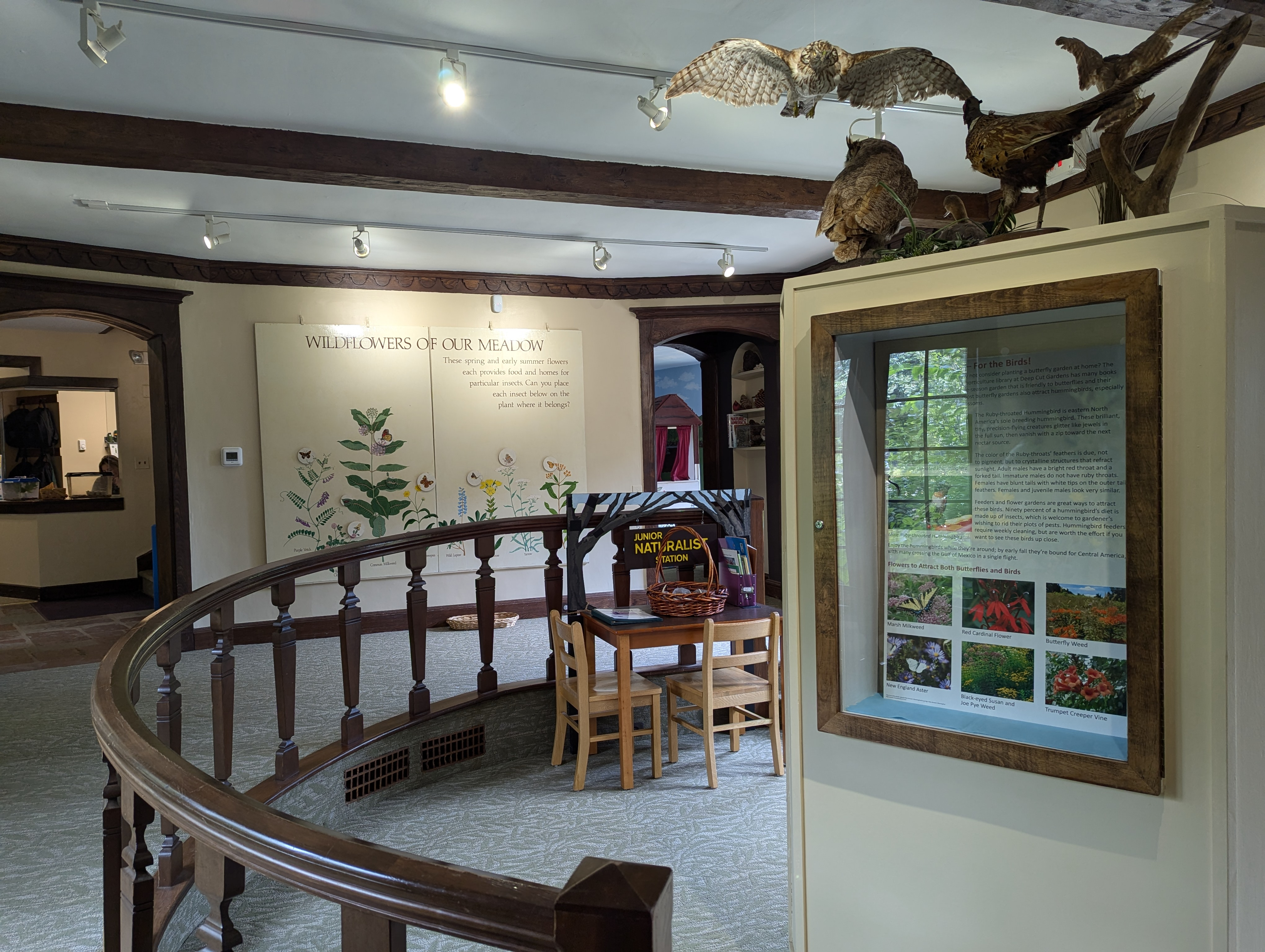
Exhibits at the environmental center.

The park's primary attraction is its 8.5 miles (13.7 km) of trails, which are used for hiking, biking, birdwatching and horseback riding. The nine different trails are each rated by difficulty and access, range from the easy 0.2 miles (0.32 km) Discovery Path to the more challenging 1.3 miles (2.1 km) Many Log Run.The 0.5 miles (0.80 km) Claypit Run trail connects the park to Hartshorne Woods Park.

The park also offers educational programs at the environmental center, which houses exhibits on the birds, plants and wildlife of Monmouth County, and also includes information about the Lenape people and the Huber family. Adjacent to the environmental center is the reptile house, which includes live displays native reptiles such as the eastern box turtle, eastern king snake, diamondback terrapin, and green frog.
