= Clayton Park =

Clayton Park may refer to:

- Clayton Park, Nova Scotia, a suburb of Halifax, Nova Scotia
- Clayton Park (album), a 1999 album by Canadian rock band Thrush Hermit
- Clayton Park (New Jersey), a county park in Upper Freehold, New Jersey
