= Frenaye =

Frenaye is a surname. Notable people with the surname include:

- Frances Frenaye (1908–1996), American translator
- William Frenaye (1900–1961), American architect
