= Monmouth County Park System =

- Type: Public
- Location: Monmouth County, New Jersey
- Established: 1960
- Status: Open year round
- Website: monmouthcountyparks.com

The Monmouth County Park System is an agency that maintains over 40 parks and recreational areas, in Monmouth County, New Jersey, United States. Established in 1960, the Park System takes up 5.9% of Monmouth County's total acreage. The largest park in the county is Turkey Swamp Park in Freehold with 2,388 acres. The most visited park in the county in 2021 was the Manasquan Reservoir in Howell with 1,412,586 visits. The entire Park System had a total of 8,668,914 visitors in 2021 compared to 645,354 residents of Monmouth County.

== List of parks ==
List of MCPS operated parks with 2021 visitation numbers
| Park | Municipality | Visitation | Acreage |
|---|---|---|---|
| Baysholm Tract* | Freehold Township | N/A | 71* |
| Bayshore Waterfront Park | Port Monmouth | 276,246 | 229 |
| Big Brook Park | Marlboro | N/A | 432 |
| Clayton Park | Upper Freehold | 32,400 | 450 |
| Crosswicks Creek Park | Upper Freehold | N/A | 2,351 |
| DeBois Creek Recreation Area* | Freehold Township | N/A | 165* |
| Deep Cut Gardens | Middletown | 195,795 | 54 |
| Dorbrook Recreation Area | Colts Neck | 735,251 | 540 |
| Durand Tract (Freehold Township Park) | Freehold Township | N/A | 94 |
| East Freehold Showgrounds | Freehold Township | 221,611 | 81 |
| Fisherman's Cove Conservation Area | Manasquan | 139,759 | 55 |
| Fort Monmouth Recreation Area | Tinton Falls | N/A | 9 |
| Freneau Woods Park | Aberdeen | N/A | 313 |
| Hartshorne Woods Park | Middletown | 495,552 | 797 |
| Henry Hudson Trail | N: Highlands to Aberdeen S: Aberdeen to Freehold | 272,347 | 234 |
| Holmdel Park | Holmdel | 1,096,379 | 664 |
| Huber Woods Park | Middletown | 114,781 | 390 |
| Longstreet Farm** | Holmdel | 102,522 | 9 |
| Historic Walnford | Upper Freehold | 12,581 | 36 |
| Manasquan Reservoir | Howell | 1,412,586 | 1,348 |
| Manasquan River Greenway | Farmingdale | N/A | 522 |
| Metedeconk River Greenway* | Freehold to Howell | N/A | 542* |
| Monmouth Cove Marina | Port Monmouth | 31,487 | 10 |
| Mount Mitchill Scenic Overlook | Atlantic Highlands | 187,283 | 12 |
| Perrineville Lake Park | Millstone | 18,911 | 1,266 |
| Seven Presidents Oceanfront Park | Long Branch | 827,315 | 38 |
| Shark River Park | Wall | 331,494 | 991 |
| Sunnyside Equestrian Area | Middletown | N/A | 135 |
| Swimming River Park | Red Bank | N/A | 18 |
| Tatum Park | Middletown | 190,963 | 366 |
| Thompson Park | Lincroft | 840,171 | 667 |
| Turkey Swamp Park | Freehold Township | 289,673 | 2,388 |
| Union Transportation Trail | Upper Freehold | 34,643 | 115 |
| Weltz Park | Ocean Township | N/A | 169 |
| Wickatunk Recreation Area | Marlboro | N/A | 115 |
| Wolf Hill Recreation Area | Oceanport | 496,228 | 92 |
| Yellow Brook Tract* | Howell | N/A | 430* |
| TOTAL | | 8,355,978 | 16,199 |

*Indicates the site is undeveloped

**Historic Longstreet Farm is part of Holmdel Park

=== Golf courses ===
List of MCPS operated golf courses with 2021 visitation numbers
| Golf Course | Municipality | Visitation | Acreage |
|---|---|---|---|
| Bel-Aire Golf Course | Wall | 57,411 | 132 |
| Charleston Springs Golf Course | Millstone | 79,984 | 820 |
| Hominy Hill Golf Course | Colts Neck | 45,054 | 262 |
| Howell Park Golf Course | Howell | 45,465 | 350 |
| Pine Brook Golf Course | Manalapan | 32,416 | 61 |
| Shark River Golf Course | Neptune | 52,607 | 176 |

== Statistics ==
In 2021, the Monmouth County Park System acquired 529 new acres of land, adding up to a grand total of 18,003 acres; 57% of this is forest, 25% is field, 6% is water, 3% is wetland, 9% is developed (impervious), and 3% is other. They have a total of 43 parks and golf courses. There are 148 miles of trails, 32 miles are paved, 30 miles are easy, 76 miles are moderate, and 10 miles are challenging. There are a total of 113 recreational facilities. In 2021, the Park System offered 5,178 recreational programs, with a program attendance of 93,983. The park system had six major events, with a total attendance of 119,024. The Park System had 347 full-time staff, 492 seasonal part-time staff, and 62 program staff/instructors.

== Finances ==
The Monmouth County Park System began 2021 with a balance of $112,704,820, with $12,550,185 coming from their trust, and $154,635 coming from donations. They had a total income of $45,511,756 and a total expenditure of $42,291,297, leaving them with a ending fund balance of $15,925,279.

2021 Income
| Location | Income | Percentage |
|---|---|---|
| County Appropriation | $22,319,972 | 49% |
| Golf Courses | $15,941,157 | 35% |
| Visitor Services | $3,061,134 | 7% |
| Parks | $2,779,975 | 6% |
| Monmouth Cove Marina | $1,400,422 | 3% |
| Donations | $9,096 | <1% |
| TOTAL | $45,511,756 | 100% |

2021 Expenditures
| Type | Expenditure | Percentage |
|---|---|---|
| Personnel | $21,954,925 | 51.91% |
| Operations | $9,108,032 | 21.54% |
| New Jersey State Sales Tax | $276,725 | <1% |
| General Revenue Returned to Treasurer | $10,951,615 | 25.90% |
