= Howell Park =

Howell Park may refer to:

- Eliza Howell Park, a park in Detroit
- John Howell Memorial Park, a park in Atlanta
- Howell Park Golf Course, a golf course in New Jersey
