= Deep Cut Gardens =

Botanical garden in New Jersey

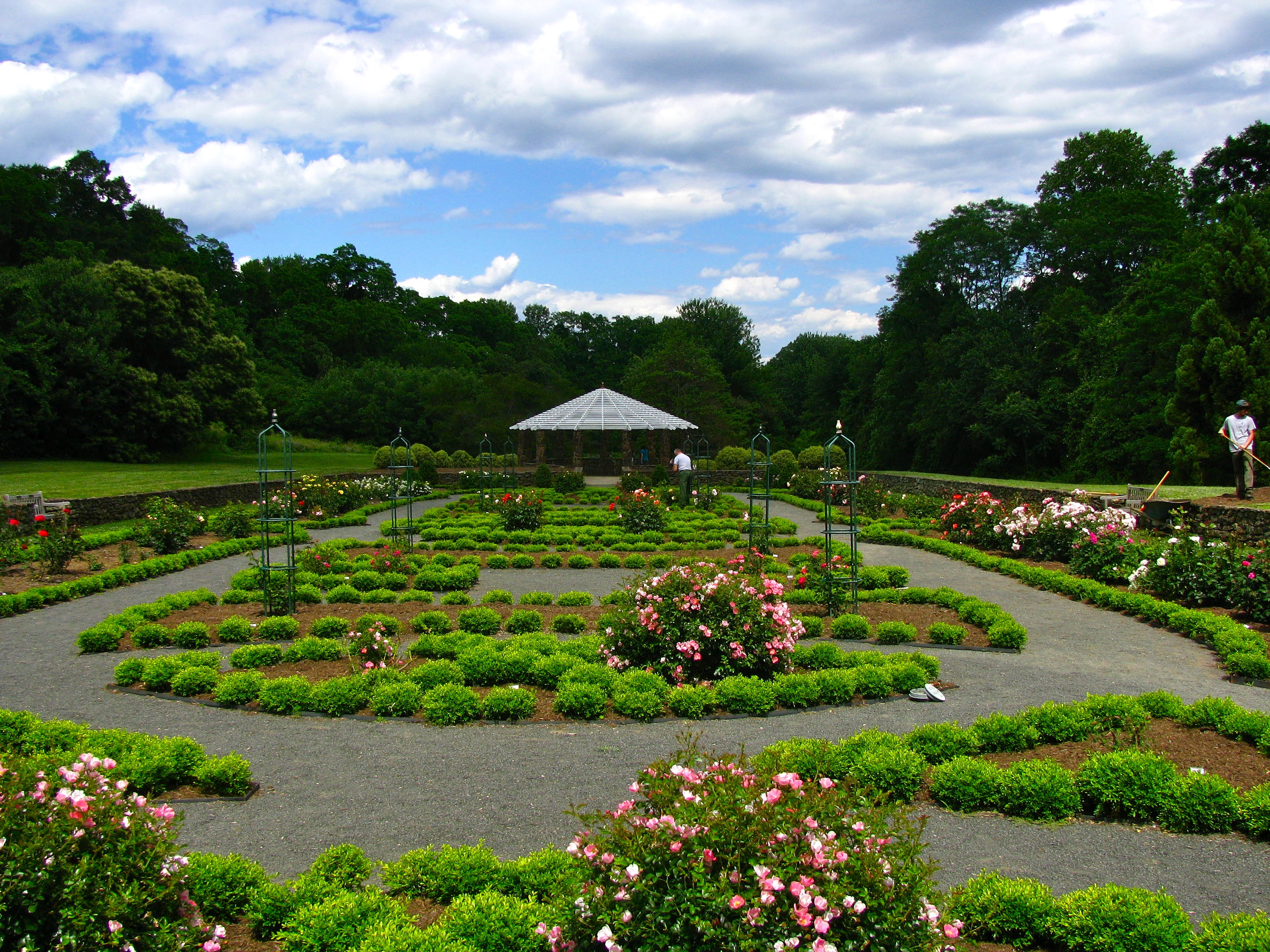
- The rose parterre at Deep Cut Gardens

- Location within Monmouth County, New Jersey Location within New Jersey Location within the United States
- Type: Botanical garden
- Location: Middletown Township, New Jersey, United States
- Coordinates: 40.39°N 74.13°W
- Area: 54 acres (0.22 km^{2})
- Created: 1978
- Owner: Monmouth County
- Operator: Monmouth County Park System
- Visitors: 114,781 (2022)
- Open: 7 AM to dusk
- Status: Open all year
- Website: www.monmouthcountyparks.com

Deep Cut Gardens is a public botanical garden in Middletown Township, New Jersey, in the United States. Adjacent to Tatum Park, the 54-acre (22 ha) garden is dedicated to home gardening, and is visited by 100,000 visitors a year. The park features a variety of gardens, including a rockery, a display greenhouse, a rose parterre and a Japanese garden. The gardens also host a variety of educational programs relating to home gardening, and the 4,000-volume Elvin McDonald Horticultural Library.

The garden passed through a number of owners before being acquired by the Monmouth County Park System, with the most famous being mobster Vito Genovese. Although Genovese's mansion on the grounds of the present park burnt down in 1937, the park contains numerous traces of his ownership, including stately Sargent's weeping hemlocks, the rock garden and a small rock replica of Mount Vesuvius, alluding to Genovese's birthplace of Naples.

== History ==
=== Early history ===
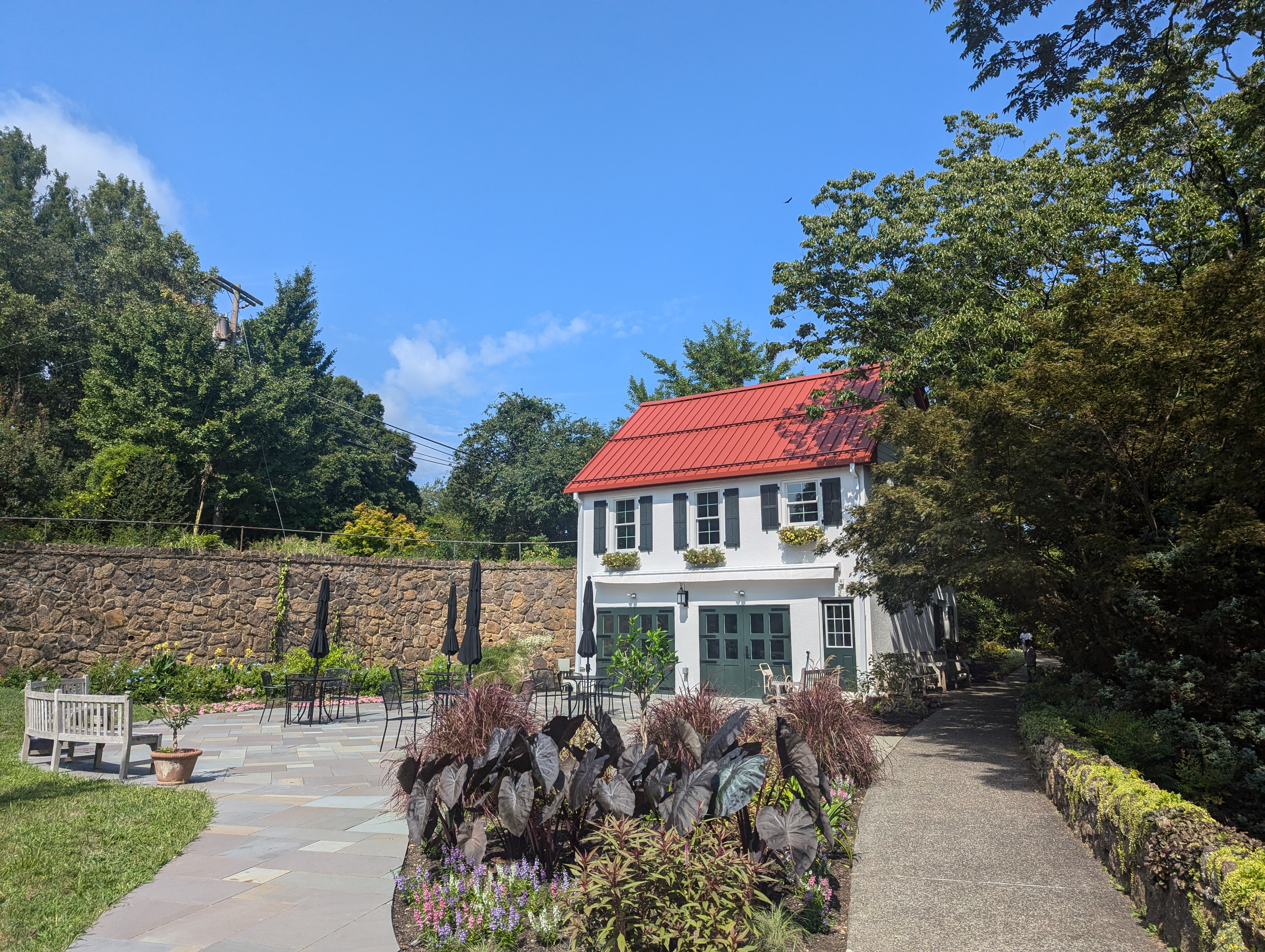
c. 1900s gardener's cottage

The land making up Deep Cut Gardens was first settled by Europeans after the Monmouth Tract was granted to Quaker settlers in 1665. The site was divided into several family farms until 1890, when the town sheriff took over the property due to unpaid taxes. The land subsequently passed through several interim owners before being purchased by New York businessman Edward Dangler and his wife Teresa for $38,000 in 1926. In 1928, the Danglers built a two-storey, eight-room Colonial Revival mansion on a hilltop overlooking the property and with views of Sandy Hook and New York Harbor.

=== Genovese ownership ===
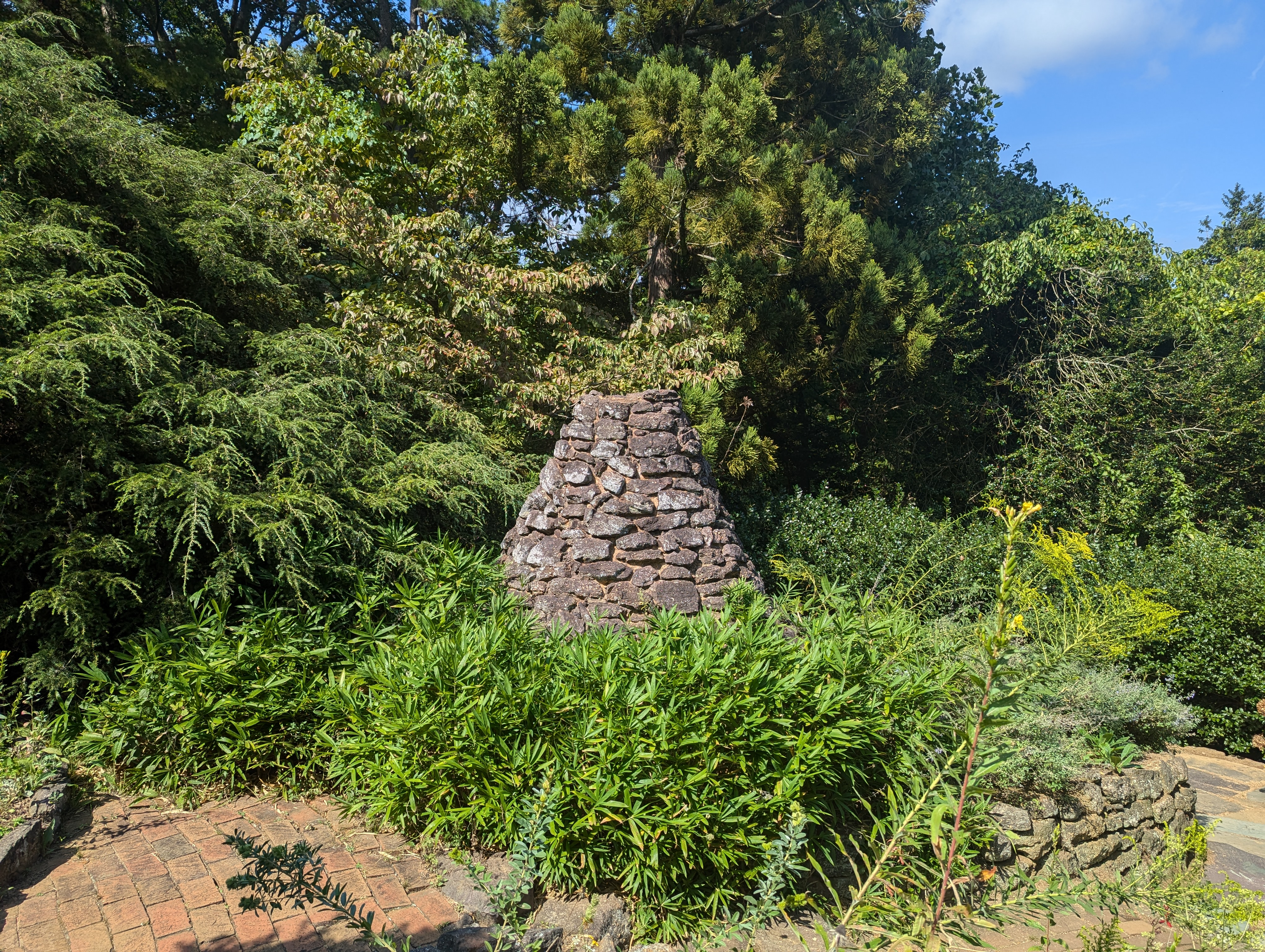
Genovese-era rock replica of Mount Vesuvius

In 1935, the Dangler mansion was sold to the mobster Vito Genovese, who was looking for a summer home and a place where his three children could be "out in the country". In the following years, Genovese undertook an ambitious renovation of the house and the property. Genovese remodeled the c. 1900s gardener's cottage into a garage with servants' quarters overhead, and expanded the mansion to twelve rooms. To landscape the grounds, Genovese hired landscape architect Theodore Stoudt to plan a new garden surrounding the house. Genovese reputedly gave a free hand to Stoudt, with his only condition that the gardens contained a small rock replica of Mount Vesuvius as a reminder of his birthplace in Naples. On special occasions and parties, a flame was stoked inside the Vesuvius replica and it would "erupt" smoke and fire.

Over the next two years, Stoudt would end up directing "a small army of stonemasons, carpenters, landscapers and nurserymen" to transform the property. Stoudt, during an interview in 1991, recalled that he "saw the garden design as a mixture of English and Italian", and did not think an Italian garden would "suit the house — or the Don's wallet." Therefore, Stoudt opted to build a "pseudo-Italian" rock garden on the steep slope behind the house, with terraced water pools, large Sargent's weeping hemlocks and the Vesuvius replica. On the foot of the hill, Stoudt wanted a garden which was "big enough to make an impression from the top of the hill", and thus opted for a rose parterre, featuring a large pergola and with plants imported from Italy. In addition to the landscaping, Genovese also constructed a large swimming pool, a three-hole golf course, two tennis courts and a greenhouse.

Nevertheless, by 1937, Genovese's fortunes had taken a turn for the worse. After allegedly ordering the murder of fellow mobster Ferdinand Boccia, and with New York prosecutor Thomas E. Dewey singling out Genovese as a target, Genovese fled to Europe. While Genovese was in Europe, on February 23, 1937, a fire broke out on the first floor of Genovese's mansion. The fire, which required 4,000 feet (1,200 m) of hoses and two hours to extinguish, resulted in the complete loss of the mansion and an estimated $80,000 worth of damages, although the gardener's cottage and greenhouse were saved. The following year, one of the landscaping contractors Genovese hired placed a lien on the property for unpaid bills.

In 1949, with the gardens falling to ruins, Genovese sold the property for $35,000, subsequently living in Atlantic Highlands, New Jersey.

=== Wihtol ownership ===
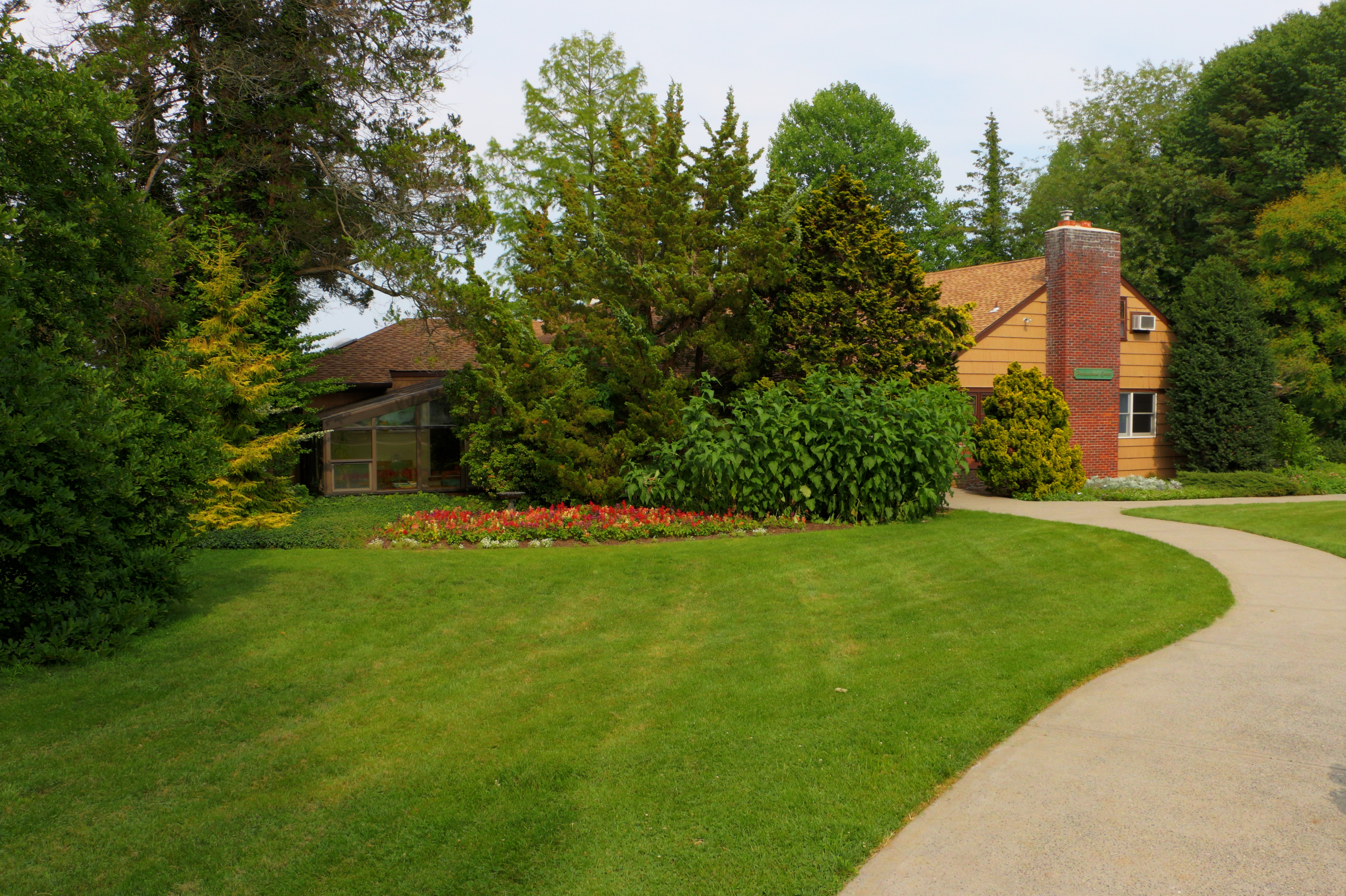
1954 ranch-style house built by the Wihtols

On December 31, 1953, Karl and Marjorie Sperry Wihtol bought the neglected property, by then named "Deep Cut Farm" after a stream on the property, and built a ranch-style house on the site of the former mansion, moving in December 1954. Marjorie, who was the daughter of Thomas Sperry, was an avid horticulturist and restored the dilapidated Genovese-era rock garden and greenhouse, planted ornamental trees and built a pool, a Japanese garden and a vegetable garden.

After Karl's death in 1970, Marjorie approached the Monmouth County Park System in 1976 with an offer to donate half of the property to the park system. When she died in 1977, she deeded half of the property for "park and horticultural purposes only". The remaining half of the property was purchased by the park system using funds from the New Jersey Department of Environmental Protection's Green Acres Program.

=== Public gardens ===
After receiving Deep Cut Farm in 1977, the park system worked over the next year restoring neglected parts of the property including uncovering the remains of the Theodore Stoudt–designed rose parterre. Deep Cut Gardens, then named Deep Cut Park, was dedicated and opened to the public on September 14, 1978. The first director of the garden, horticulturist Margaret 'Peggy' Crooks, oversaw the conversion of the Wihtol home into the Horticultural Center, the conversion of the Wihtols' pool to a koi pond, the planting of demonstration plots and specimen trees. In 1991, Deep Cut Park was renamed to Deep Cut Gardens.

Between 2007 and 2010, the park system restored the original rose parterre in cooperation with Rutgers University. Aerial photographs of the original garden were used to inform the restoration, which repaired the crumbling stone walls and replanted the rose beds. In 2009, the park system started planting native species beds to encourage environmentally sustainable gardening practices. In 2023, the park system began renovating the c. 1900s gardener's cottage as well as beginning construction on a new gazebo.

== Gardens description ==
Deep Cut Gardens today spans over 54 acres (22 ha), adjacent to Tatum Park, which is also run by the Monmouth County Park System. The park is intended as a "living catalogue" of cultivated and native plants, and is also dedicated to educating and assisting home gardeners. A variety of gardens exist in the park reflecting the historic nature of the gardens as well as the varying tastes and preferences of the park's various owners.

=== Rockery ===
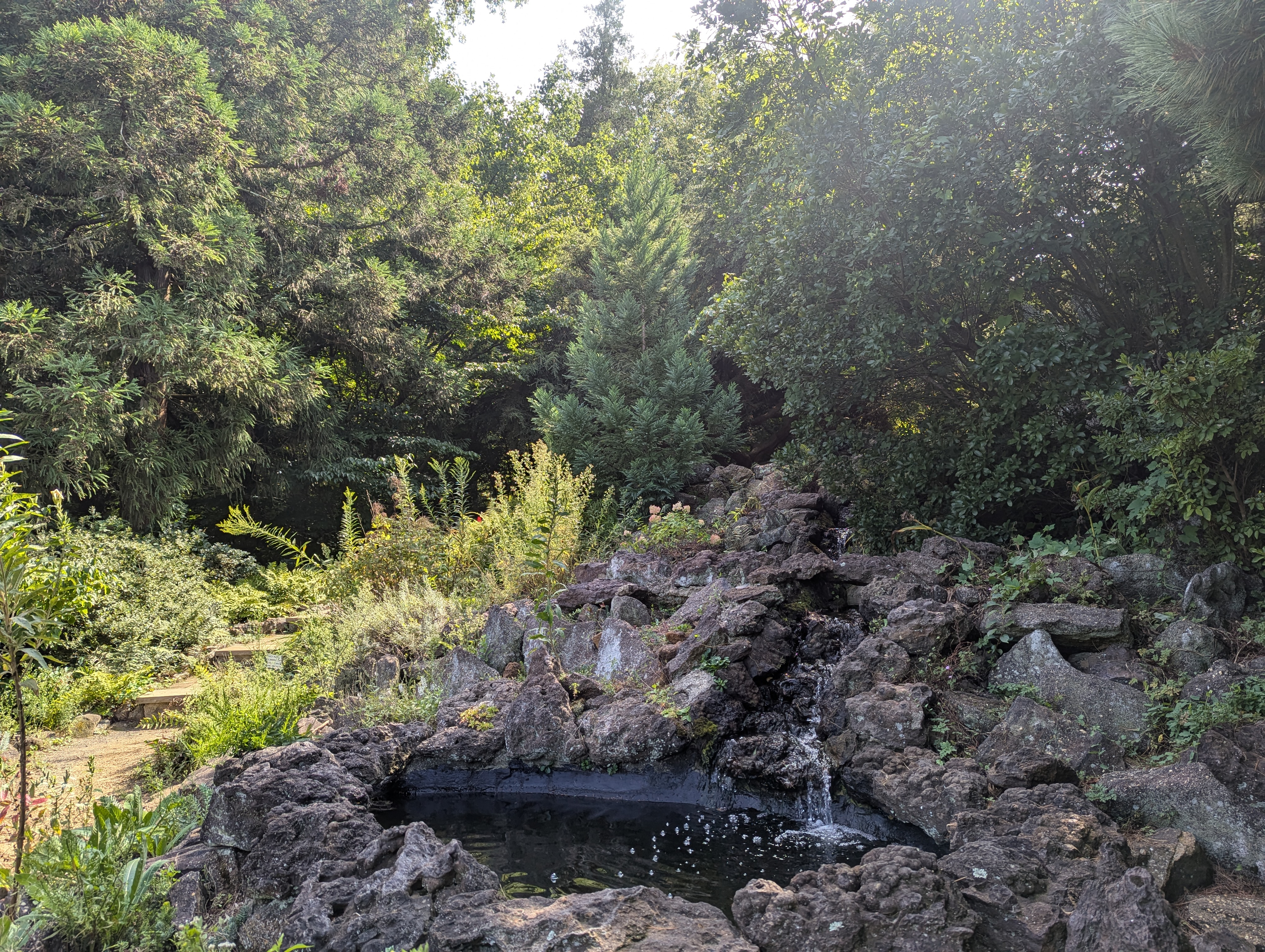
Water features at the rockery

The rockery, or rock garden, is a Genovese-era garden which sprawls under the hillside where the mansion once stood, and where the Horticultural Center stands today. The terraced "pseudo-Italian" rockery was designed by Theodore Stoudt and features three cascading pools which draw water from a deep well on the property. Large Sargent's weeping hemlocks, measuring 35 feet (11 m) across, form a canopy over the garden, with Cryptomeria and dwarf white pine trees also present in the garden. Reflecting Genovese's Italian heritage, lava rock imported from Italy was used to line the pools, and the rock replica of Mount Vesuvius is located in the garden. Nevertheless, most of the rock used to construct the rockery and other structures on the property is actually sedimentary ironstone, known locally as peanut stone and sourced from the local vicinity. The flowers planted in the rockery include rhododendrons, catmint, rose campion, and spiderwort.

=== Rose parterre ===
The rose parterre, located at the base of the hill and under the rockery, was also designed by Theodore Stoudt for Genovese's mansion. Like other parterres in the world, the recessed parterre at Deep Cut Gardens uses box hedges to create patterns which are filled with roses and other blooming flowers. The parterre, intended by Stoudt to be viewed from the hilltop mansion, was buried after the property was sold and became a meadow, with only a circular pergola constructed at the back of the parterre remaining visible during the intervening years. Between 2007 and 2010, the rose parterre was restored by the park system and Rutgers University. The restored parterre contains 52 rose cultivars and 180 bushes arrayed in a 140-foot (43 m) by 100-foot (30 m) symmetrical pattern, and along with the restored pergola is a focal point of the gardens and a popular setting for photography.

=== Display greenhouse ===
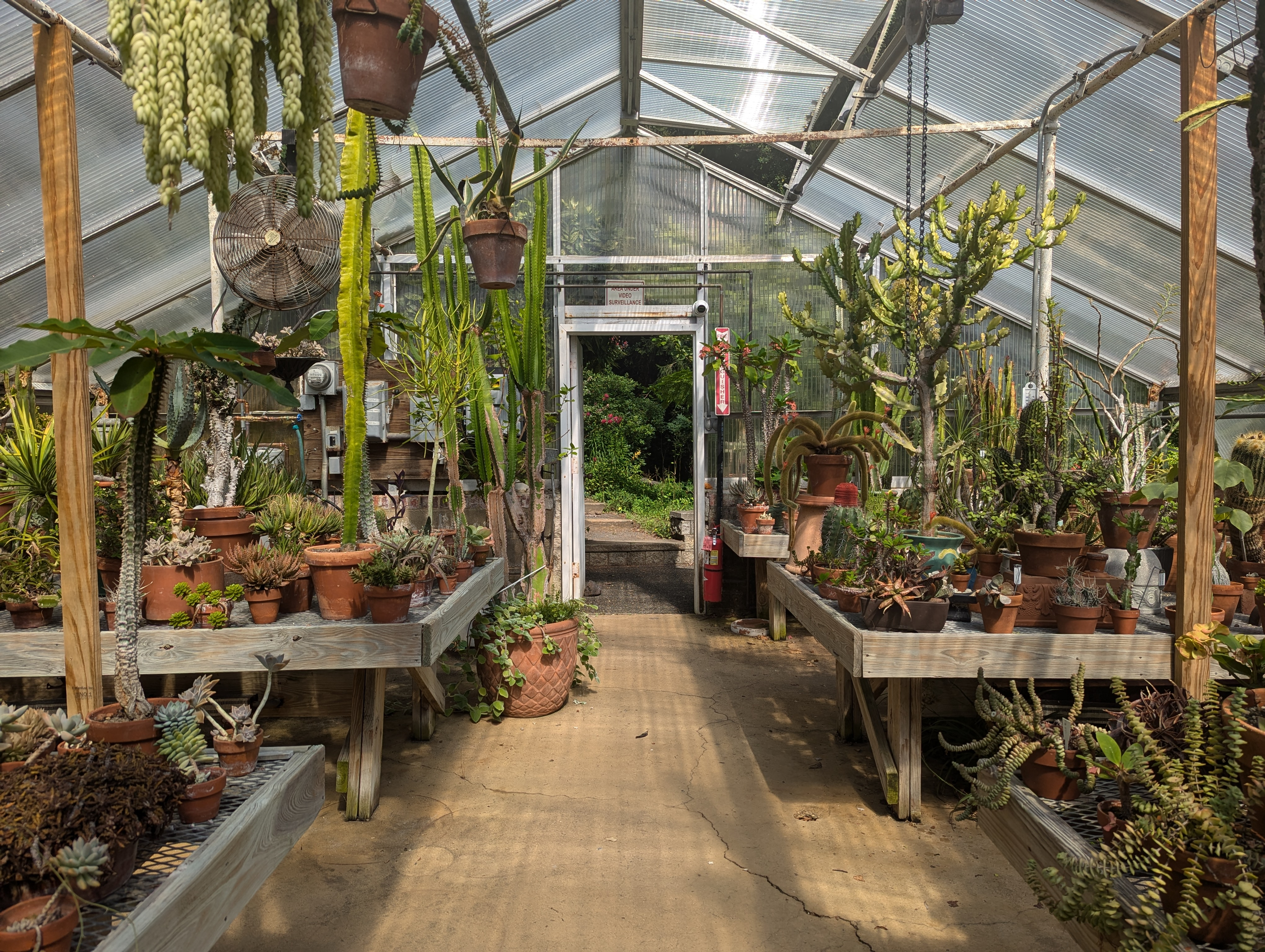
Succulents in the display greenhouse

The heated display greenhouse dates back to the Genovese-era, and was later renovated by the Wihtols in the 1950s to display their large collection of succulents acquired from the United States, Britain, South America and South Africa. The greenhouse after being acquired by the park system was renovated in 1990 by replacing the frame and glazing with polycarbonate.The current greenhouse is divided into three sections representing different growing conditions; a section contains bromeliads, palms and other tropical plants such as staghorn ferns and hibiscus, a section with a wide variety of orchids and bonsai, and a section housing succulents and plants grown in a mediterranean climate.

=== Display garden ===
The display garden, located south of the greenhouse and the Horticultural Center, is part of a network of All-America Selections (AAS) display gardens in the United States, and is marked by the intense cultivation of vegetables, flowers and herbs received from the AAS. The garden is divided into several sections with differing themes, including a section with colorful flowers named the "Candy Store" and a section called "Pink POP" which includes hybrids of Echinacea purpurea and Verbena bonariensis. The display gardens have won accolades from the AAS, in 2023 winning third place in the AAS Display Garden Challenge.

=== Other gardens and landscape features ===
To the immediate north of the display greenhouse is a small Japanese garden planted by the Wihtols, featuring stone lanterns, statues and conifers. Some of the plantings in the garden include Hurricane Lilies, buttercup witch hazel, and bitter oranges. Directly adjacent to the greenhouse in the south is the park's bonsai collection, which contains eighty plants, some over a century old. A bonsai club maintains and promotes the collection.

Beside the rockery is the shade garden, which was planted by the park system after acquisition of the site in the late 1970s. The garden, shaded by a canopy of tulip poplar and spruce trees, is home to shade-tolerant plants including columbines, wild gingers, foamflowers and azaleas.

Other features in the park include the historic front lawn, which after a century of planting includes trees such as Japanese maple, China fir, dawn redwood and paperback maple, a rain garden, pollinator garden, and keeping in the park's mission of home gardening education, a composting demonstration garden. Water features in the park include a natural pond and the former Wihtol-era swimming pool which has been converted into a koi pond. Trails also traverse the undeveloped portions of the park.

== Activities and facilities ==
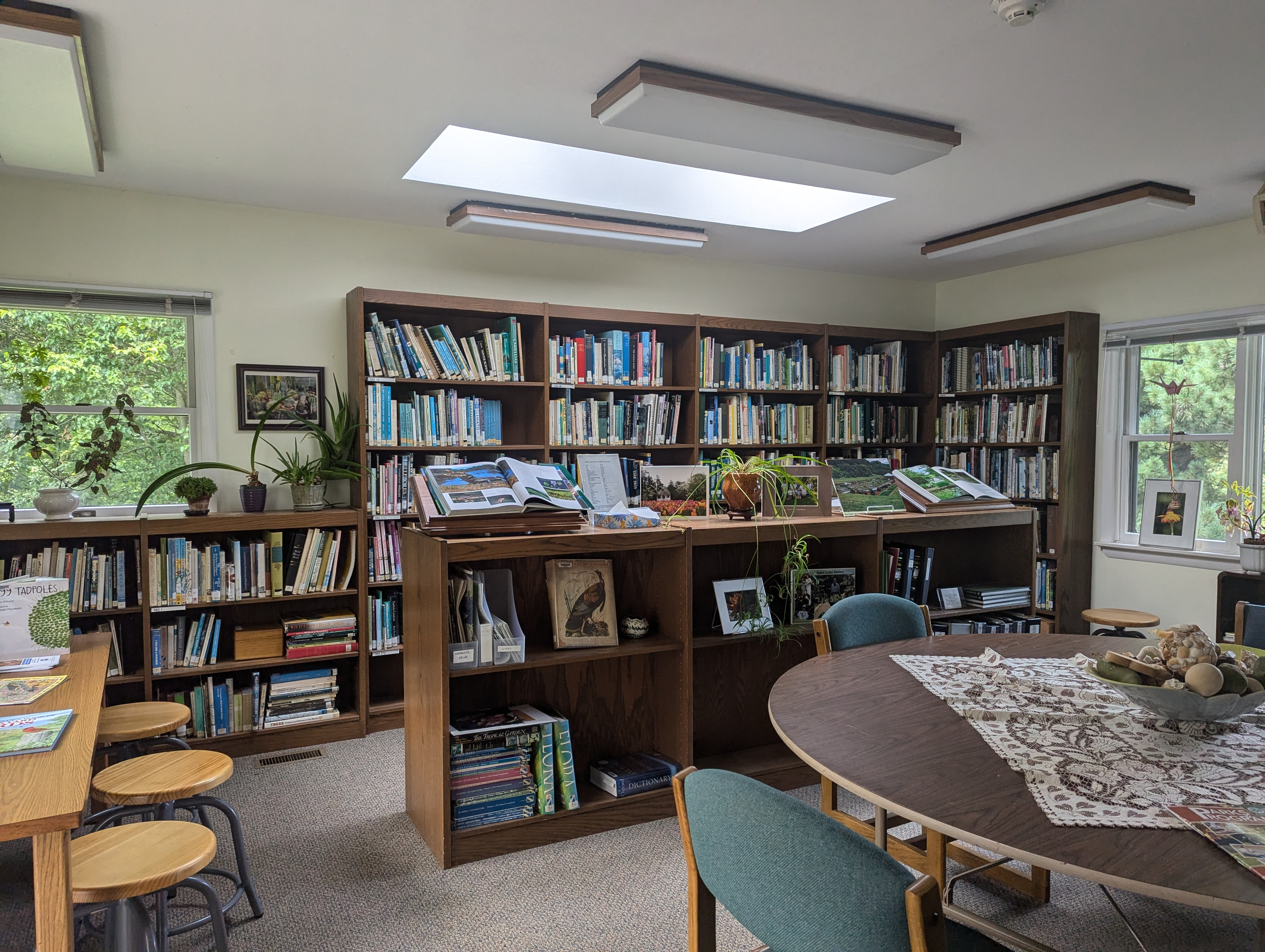
Elvin McDonald Horticultural Library in the Horticultural Center

Deep Cut Gardens, keeping to its mission to educate and assist home gardeners, hosts a variety of gardening resources, programs and facilities. The Horticultural Center, housed in the former Wihtol residence, houses a seed exchange station and the Elvin McDonald Horticultural Library, which houses over 4,000 volumes and periodicals with an emphasis on home gardening, horticulture and landscape design. The park system also arranges events at the park such as open houses and plant swaps throughout the year, with garden tours, demonstrations and children's activities offered free of charge.

== Gallery ==
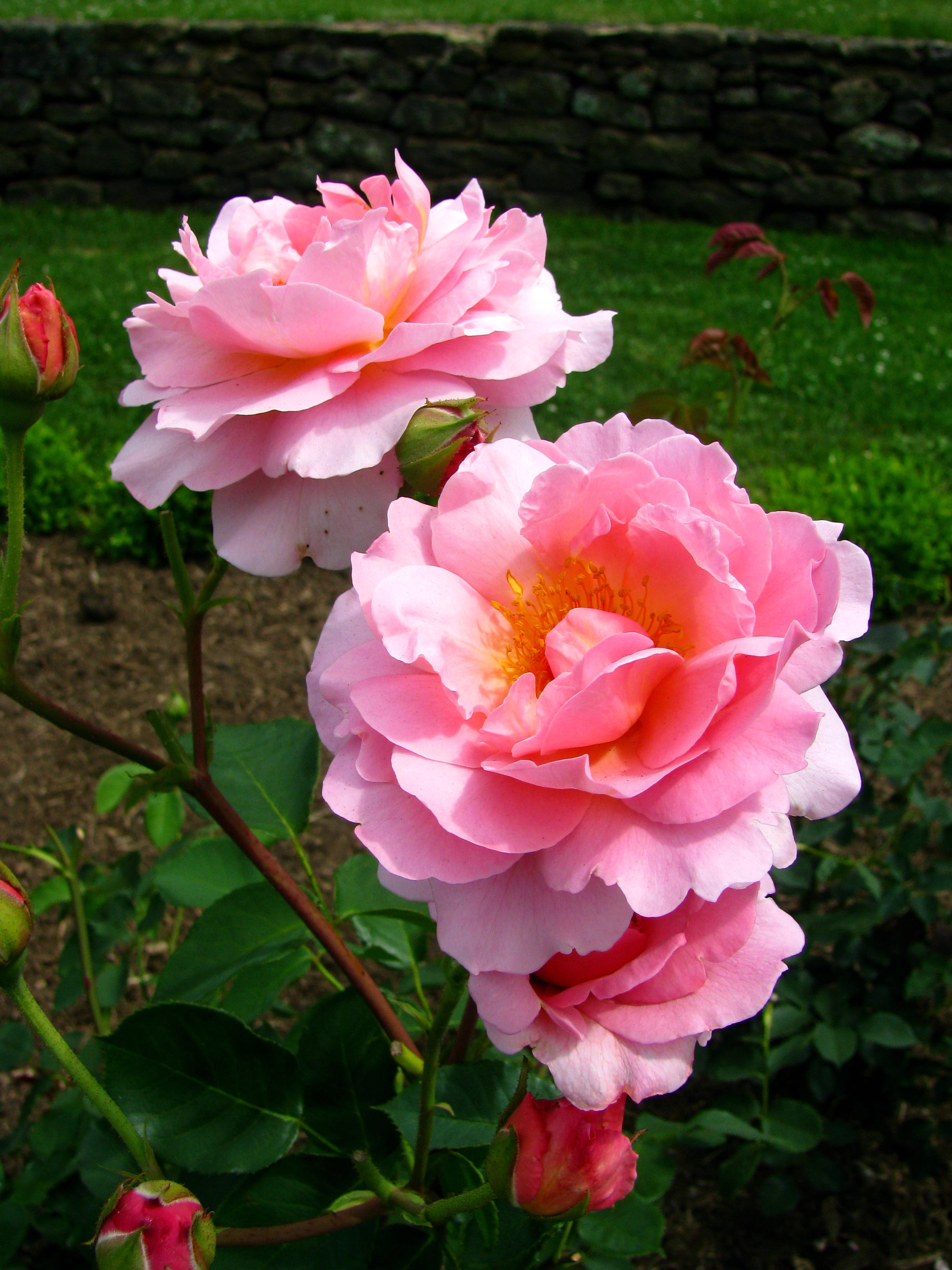
Rose in the rose parterre

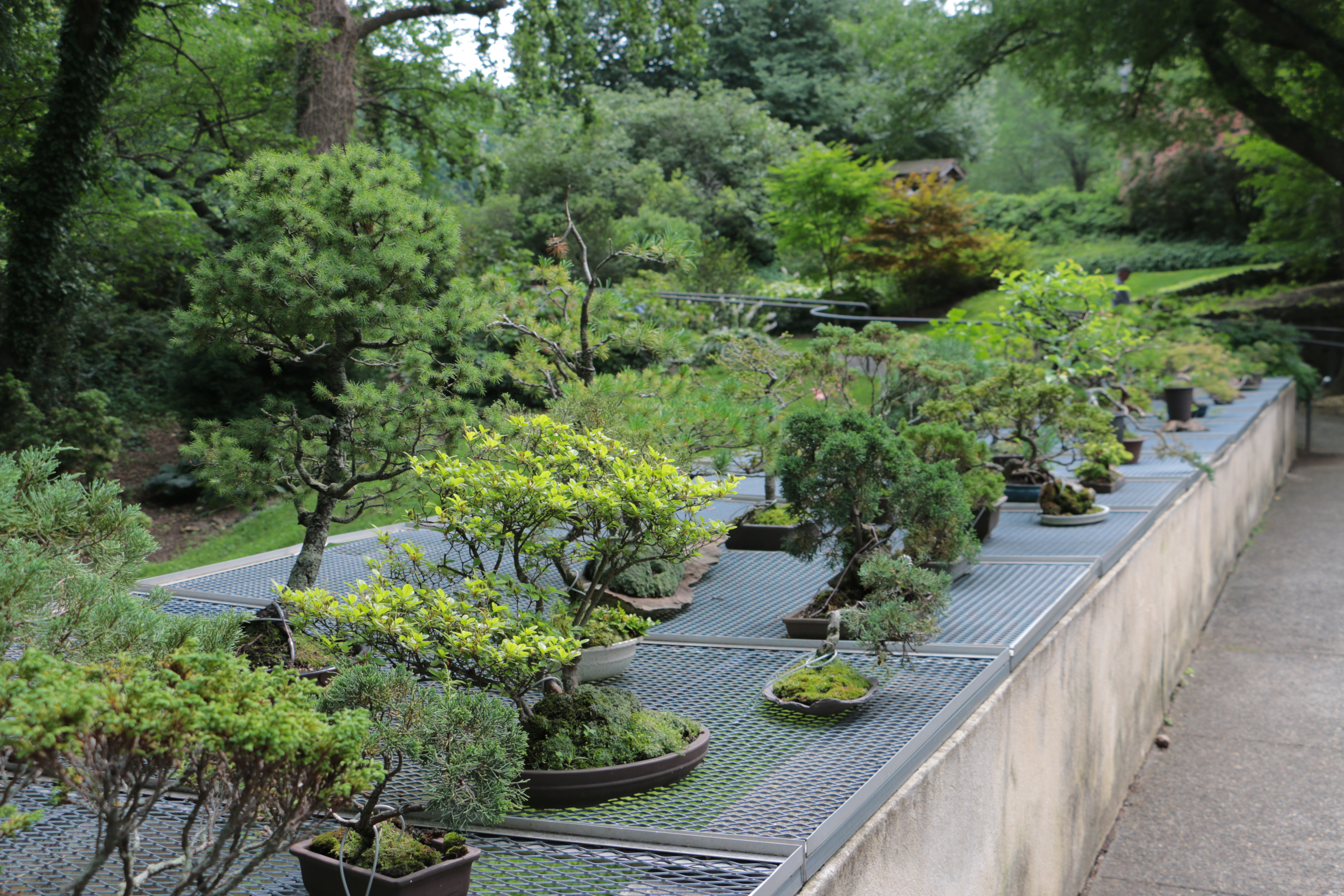
Bonsai collection at Deep Cut Gardens

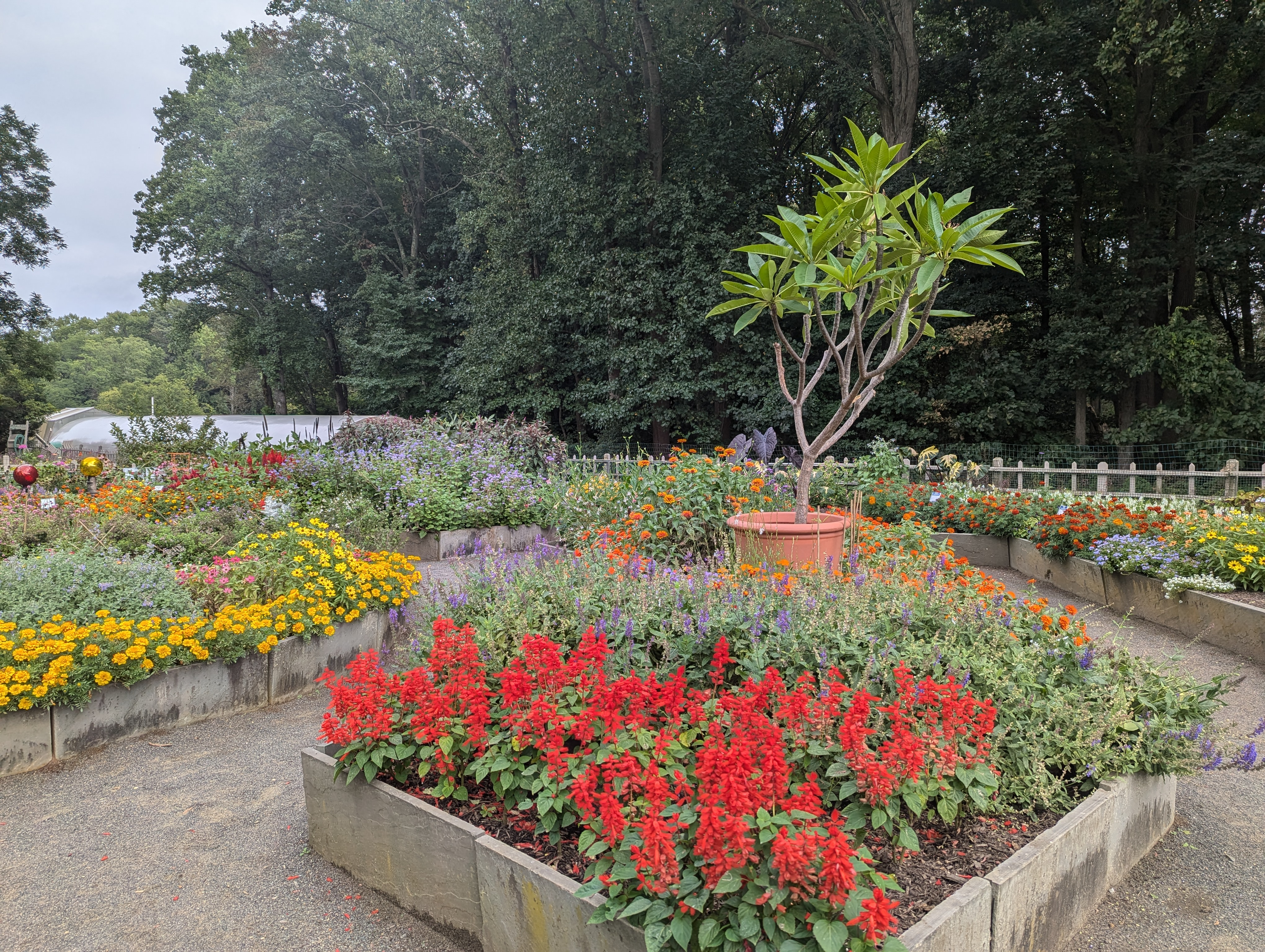
The display garden

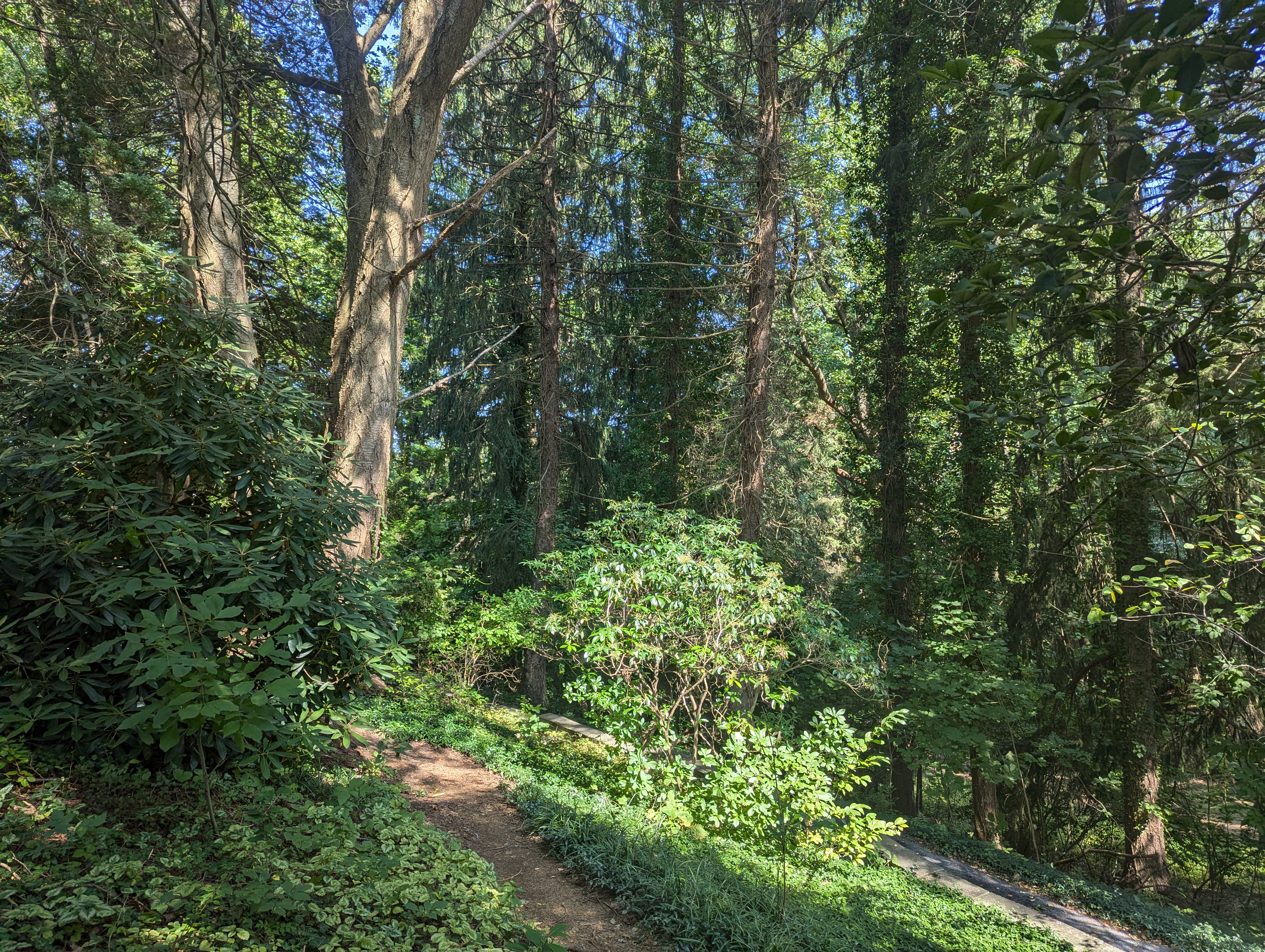
The shade garden

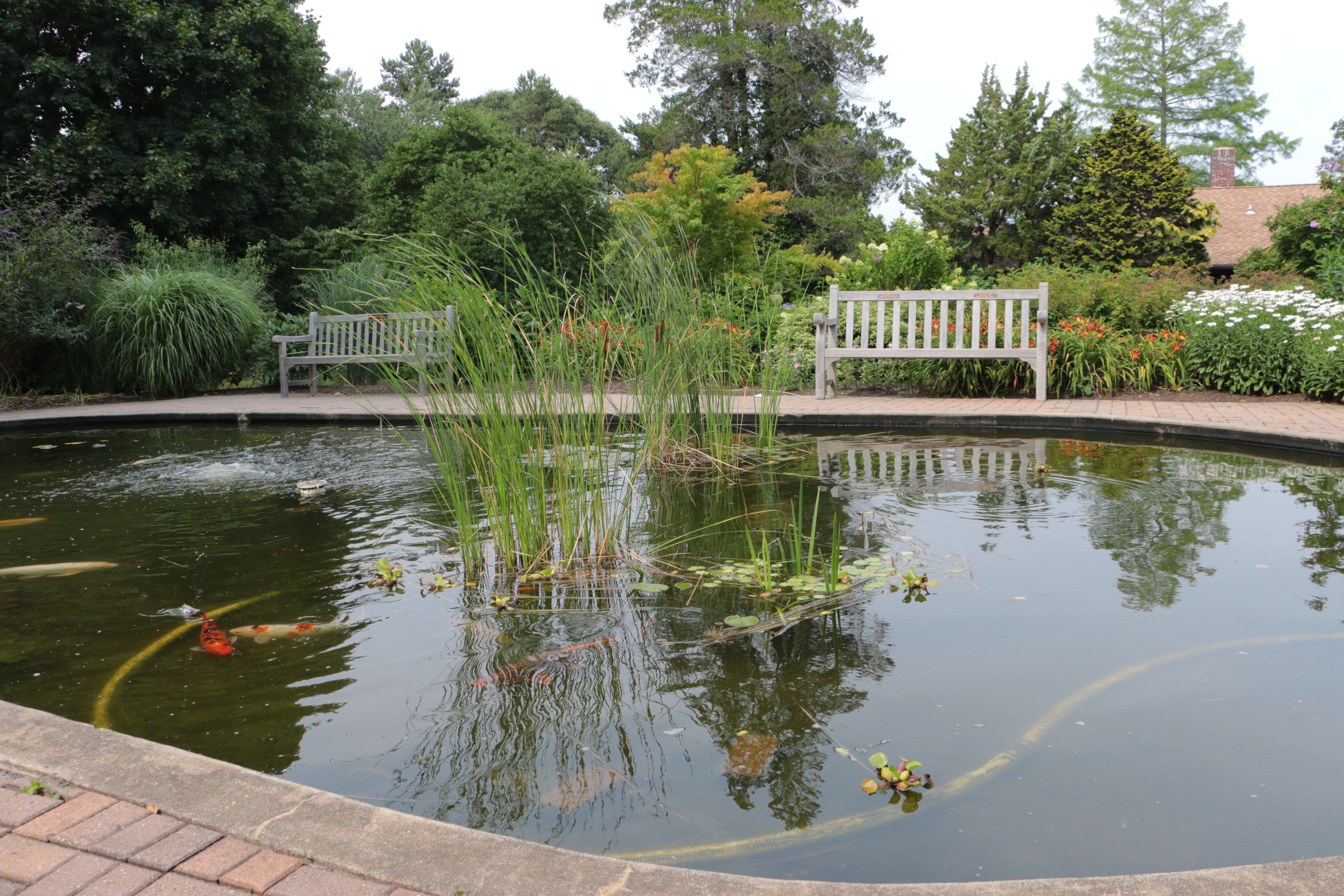
Koi pond, formerly the Wihtols' swimming pool
