= Freneau Woods Park =

County park in Monmouth County, Aberdeen Township, New Jersey

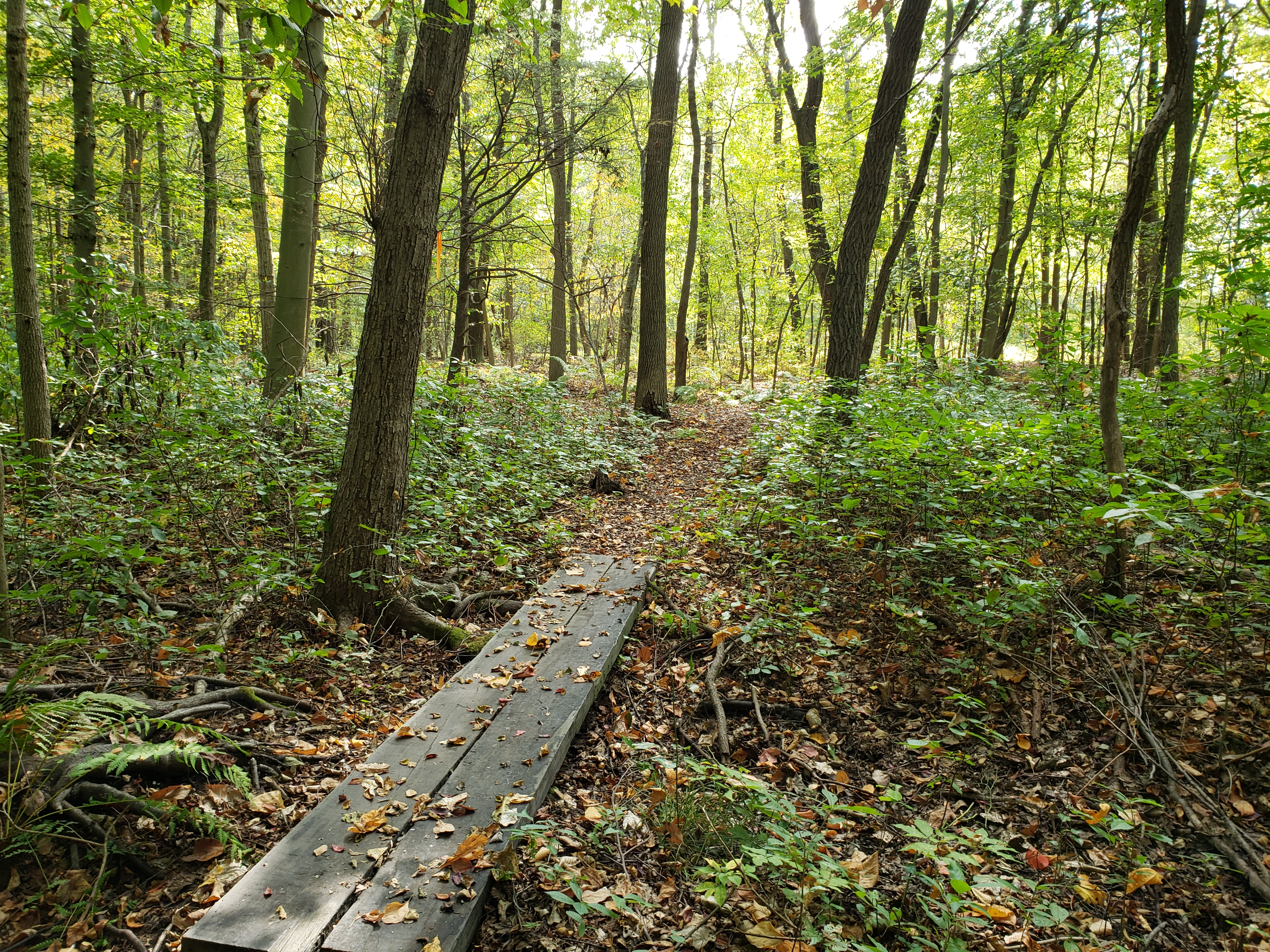
- The deciduous woodlands of Freneau Woods Park
- Interactive map of Freneau Woods Park
- Type: Passive park
- Location: Aberdeen Township, New Jersey, United States
- Coordinates: 40.400419°N 74.253036°W
- Area: 313 acres (1.27 km^{2})
- Created: 2011
- Owner: Monmouth County
- Operator: Monmouth County Park System
- Open: 7 AM - Dusk
- Status: Open all year
- Hiking trails: 4
- Habitats: Mixed Oak Forest
- Designation: Passive Park
- Website: www.monmouthcountyparks.com

Freneau Woods Park is a county park near the northern border of Monmouth County, in Aberdeen Township, New Jersey.

Acquired by the Monmouth County Park System in 2011, As of 2019 the park consisted of 210 acres of fields and forests along the headwaters of the Matawan Creek and the southern boundary of Lake Lefferts. The park provides important habitats and green space in a densely populated part of the county. Part of the property was once owned by Philip Morin Freneau, "The Poet of the American Revolution", after whom the park is named. Later, the property was owned by a monastery, whose former buildings are used for events and as a visitor center. The park has since grown to 313 acres in size.

== Activities and facilities ==
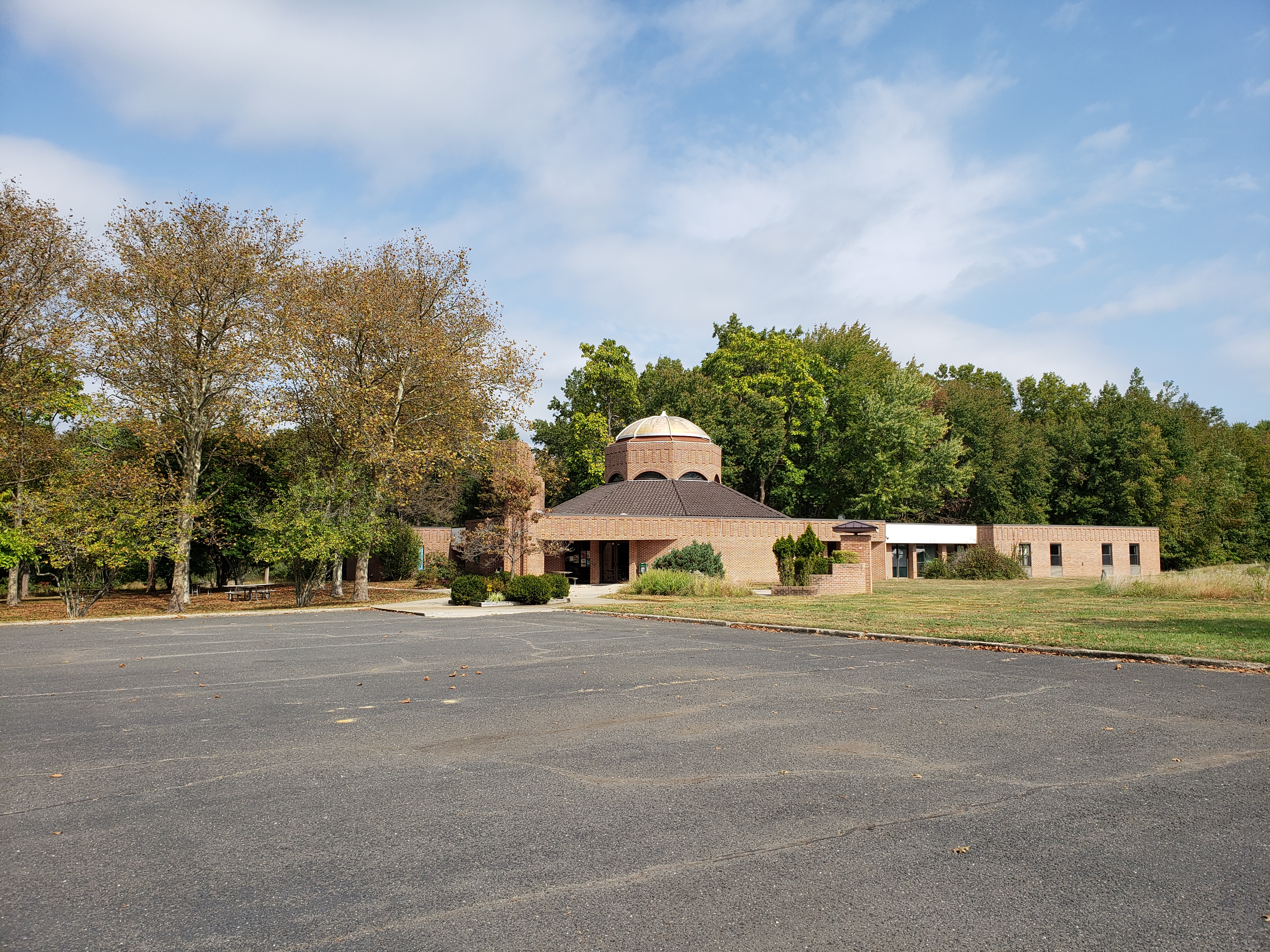
Formerly a monastery, this building now serves as the visitor center.

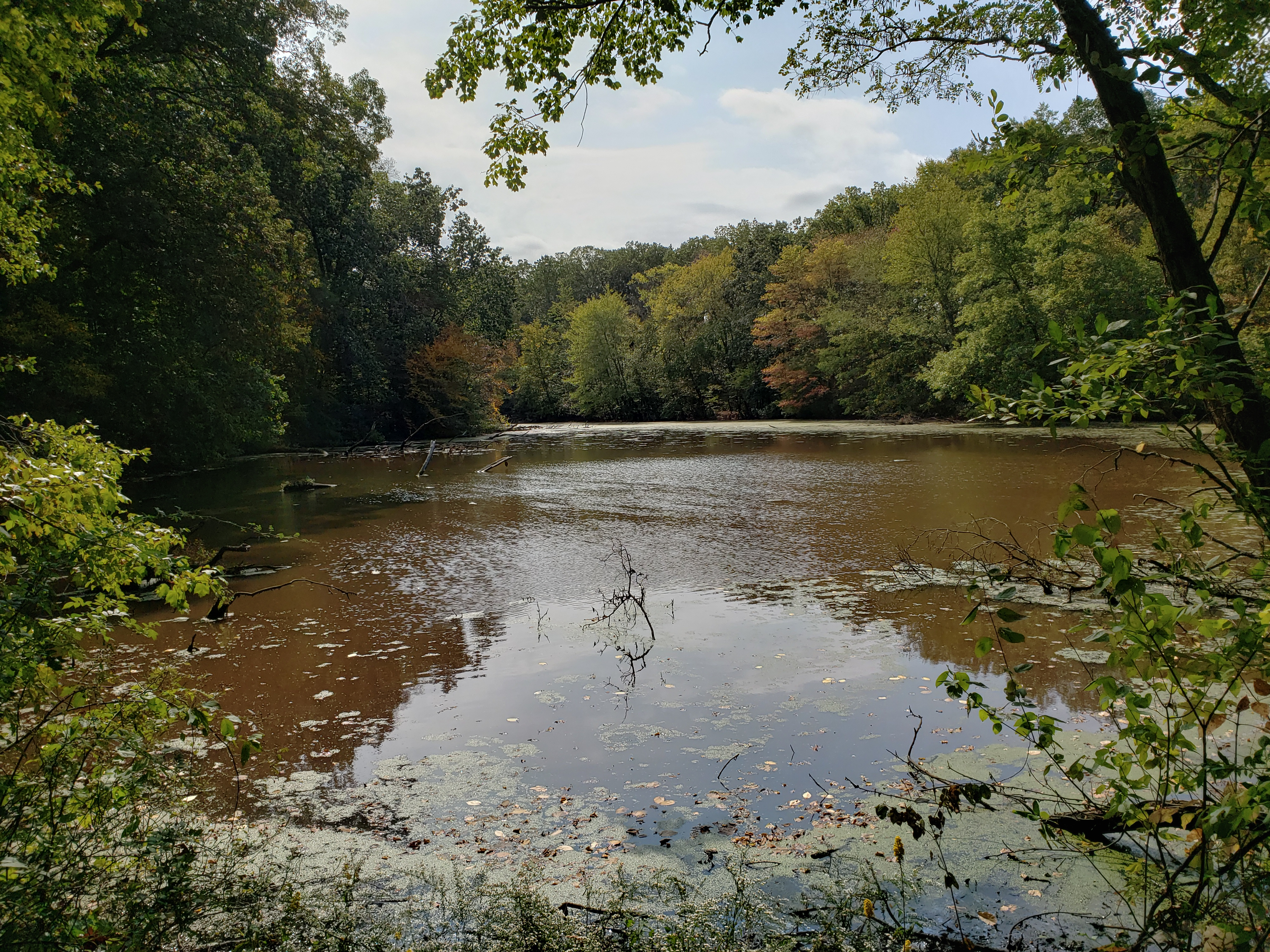
A pond in early fall in Freneau Woods Park.

Freneau Woods is currently a passive park, offering self-guided hiking, biking and horse riding on nearly 3 miles (4.8 km) of trails. In addition to self-guided activities, the park system offers programs and guided hikes. It is hoped that the park may be eventually connected to the Henry Hudson Trail.
