= Turkey Swamp Park =

County park and nature preserve in Freehold Township, New Jersey

Coordinates: 40.197°N 74.305°W

Turkey Swamp County Park
- Turkey Swamp Park
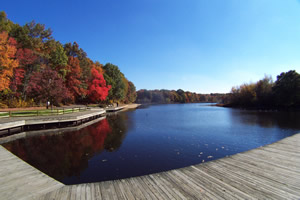
- The lake at Turkey Swamp Park during the autumn months
- Interactive map of Turkey Swamp County Park
- Type: Nature reservation
- Location: Freehold Township, Monmouth County, New Jersey
- Nearest city: Freehold Borough
- Operator: Monmouth County Park System
- Status: Open all year
- Website: https://www.monmouthcountyparks.com/page.aspx?Id=2540

Turkey Swamp Park is a 2,388-acre (966 ha) county park and nature preserve in Freehold Township, New Jersey. Within the northernmost fringes of the Pine Barrens, the Turkey Swamp area is located on a ridge, being a major drainage divide within Central New Jersey. It includes the headwaters of the Manasquan that flows into Manasquan Inlet, and the Metedeconk and Toms River systems that flow into Barnegat Bay, to the east; the Manalapan Brook system that is part of the Raritan River basin, to the north; and the Assunpink and Crosswicks systems that flow into the Delaware River, and the Millstone River system that also flows to the Raritan, to the west. The chief recreational attraction of this park is the 17-acre (6.9 ha) lake suitable for bass, bluegill and catfish fishing, as well as canoeing and paddle boating.

It is adjacent to the over 4,000-acre (1,600 ha) Turkey Swamp Wildlife Management Area.

== History ==
The core of the park was purchased in 1963. Additional land was purchased in the 1970s. In May 1993, the Park System acquired 303-acre (123 ha) Camp Nomoco including a 56-acre (23 ha) campground from the Monmouth Council of Girl Scouts to add it to Turkey Swamp Park. The Council had operated the camp since 1947. The Council trustees were determined to sell the camp, as a Wall Herald reporter noted, to “a buyer who cares more about nature and a pristine environment than about developing the land.” The Nomoco acquisition also helped protect the Metedeconk River watershed while converting a private camping facility into a public one.

== Nomenclature ==
The title of the park may be considered a bit of a misnomer considering the park does not bear a swamp, nor does it act as a habitat for turkeys. Although considering that the soil is rather sandy and the water table lies slightly beneath the surface, this thus gives rise to swampy conditions at times when the surface topography dips to the water line; hence the 'swamp' title. The 'turkey' prefix, however, was adapted from the town's previous name, Turkey. The town once known as Turkey is now known as the unincorporated area of Adelphia.

== Park information ==
The park features 9 miles (14 km) of trails, an archery range, an array of playgrounds, two soccer fields, and various picnic grounds. During the appropriate season, canoes, paddleboats, kayaks, and rowboats may be rented. During the winter season, if the lake freezes sufficiently, ice-skating is available for park visitors. A significant section of the park is dedicated as a seasonal campground, complete with laundry facilities, hot-water bathrooms, and RV electric & water hook-ups. It consists of 64 pull-through campsites that can accommodate both tent campers and travel trailers. Two wood "forest view" cabins are also available.

== Nomoco Activity Area ==
A more secluded area in the park, called the Nomoco Activity Area, is also available for use by groups interested in group activities. It consists of six sites each capable of accommodating groups of up to 40 people. One of the sites, called "the Outpost" is more secluded yet, requiring a hike through the woods of 1/4 mile to reach. This area is good for groups seeking wilderness camping. In the Outpost, drinking water, for example, must be carried in, although ground water from hand pump-driven wells are available in the general area. Also, a pit toilet is available as there are no other relief facilities at the Outpost.

=== Flora ===
The flora of Turkey Swamp Park is representative of the northern fringes of the New Jersey Pine Barrens, and includes pitch pine, scrub oak, white oak, sweet gum, pepperbush, huckleberry and blueberry.

=== Trails ===
- The orange-blazed trail, a 1-mile-long (1.6 km) trail Circumnavigating the lake.
- The red-blazed trail, a 1.75-mile-long (2.82 km) trail which leads into the woodsy camping area.
- The green-blazed, a 1-mile (1.6 km) trail leading to the lakefront area and bordering the red-blazed trail.
- The blue-blazed, a 0.5-mile (0.80 km) trail which guides hikers to the boathouse.
