= Manasquan Reservoir =

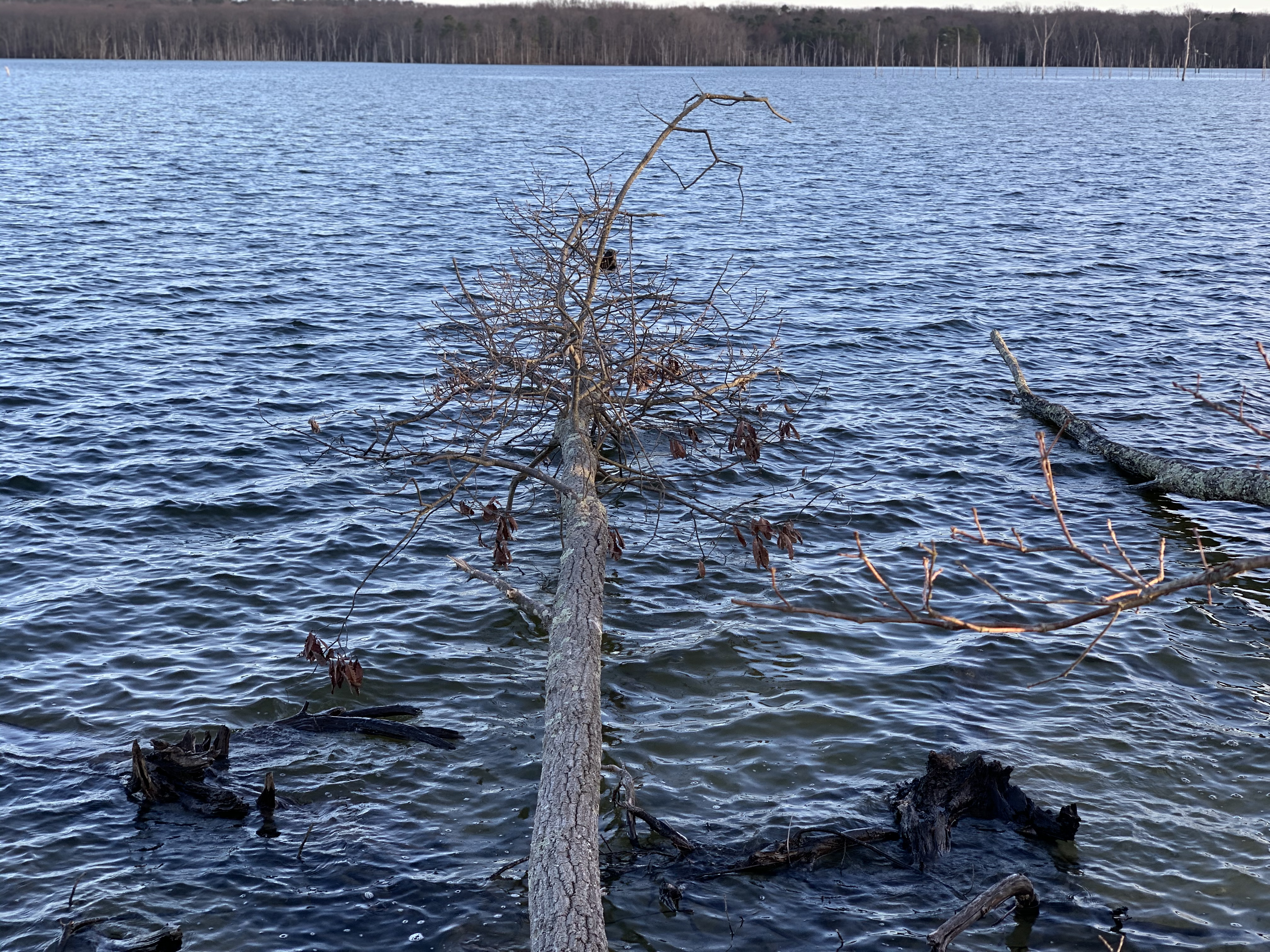
- The reservoir in early spring

- Location within New Jersey Location within the United States
- Location: Monmouth County, New Jersey
- Coordinates: 40.178775°N 74.207239°W
- Type: Reservoir
- Primary inflows: Timber Swamp Brook
- Primary outflows: Timber Swamp Brook
- Basin countries: United States
- Surface area: 770 acres (310 ha)
- Max. depth: 40 ft (12 m)

Manasquan Reservoir County Park
- Interactive map of Manasquan Reservoir County Park
- Type: Passive park
- Location: Howell, New Jersey, United States
- Nearest town: Howell, New Jersey
- Area: 1,204 acres (4.87 km^{2})
- Created: 1990
- Etymology: Lenape Native American dialect meaning "mouth of the river"
- Owner: Monmouth County
- Operator: Monmouth County Park System
- Visitors: 1.1 million (in 2010)
- Open: 7AM - dusk (Environmental Center: 10AM-5PM)
- Status: Open all year
- Camp sites: No
- Hiking trails: 5
- Habitats: Bald eagle
- Species: Birds: great blue heron, osprey, double-crested cormorant, bald eagle. Also: frogs, turtles, snakes, white-tailed deer, red fox, raccoon
- Collections: Several, at Environmental Center
- Designation: Wilderness Reserve
- Parking: cars and trailers, 5 lots
- Public transit: None
- Other information: Small picnic areas

The Manasquan Reservoir is a source of water for municipalities and utilities, as well as a 1,204-acre (4.87 km^{2}) park, located in Howell Township, in Monmouth County, New Jersey, United States. The reservoir doubles as a park that is part of the Monmouth County Park System. The park has trails, a visitor center, a nature/environmental center, a boat launching area and several dikes for fishing, among its facilities. The reservoir itself, which is dammed from the Manasquan River, is operated by the New Jersey Water Supply Authority, which is a part of the much larger Raritan Basin Watershed. The nature trails circling around the reservoir are what makes this county park as one of the most popular hiking destinations in Central New Jersey, as the park receives over one million visitors a year. It is reachable by car and there are five parking lots, including one for vehicles hauling trailers. The park's trails are open to walkers, runners, hikers, bicyclists and equestrians.

== Trails ==
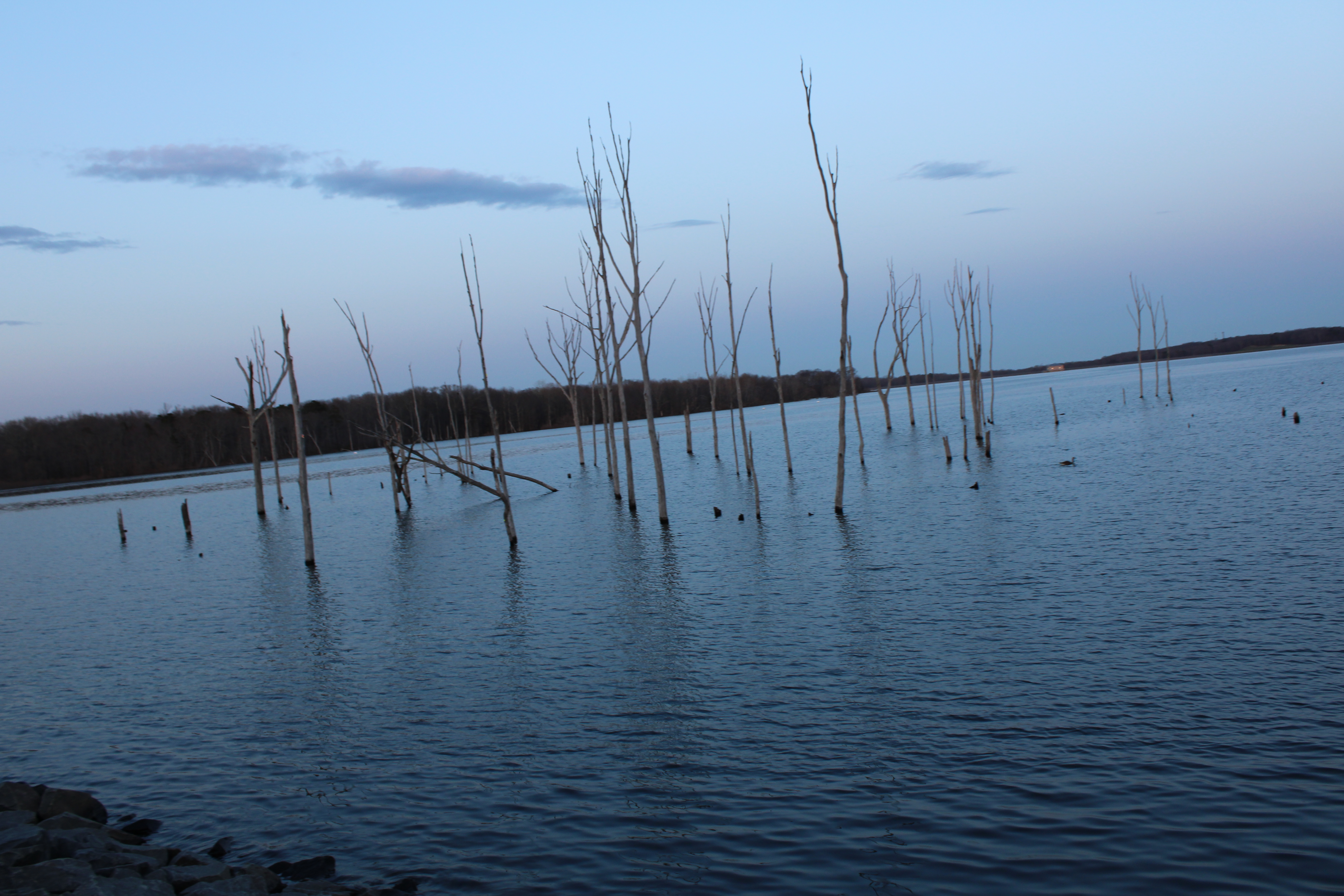
Manasquan Reservoir in early spring

The park has five trails, with the Perimeter Trail (5.1 miles long) and Cove Trail (1.1 miles long) being the two longest. There are also three other shorter trails: the Wetlands Spur (0.2 mile long), the Environmental Center's Bracken Trail (0.2 mile long) and the Bear Swamp Connector Trail (0.5 mile long). The park has 6.2 miles of trails rated at an easy-to-moderate physical challenge level in a 1,204-acre area that includes the reservoir itself

The 5.1-mile (8.2 km) multi-use Perimeter Trail surrounds the reservoir. The trail is signed with blue-colored metal posts and is marked with brown-colored wooden mileposts. It starts in the vicinity of the visitors parking area. The mile posts run in a clockwise direction (as the viewer looks north), and start at the southern portion of the park. The shorter trails have no milepost markings. The shorter trails are also considerably narrower. The width of the perimeter trail fluctuates between 8 and 24 feet (7.3 m), whereas that of the side trails is usually no greater than 3 feet (0.91 m). Footbridges in the path are 6 feet (1.8 m) wide. The trail surface is mostly crushed gravel (quarry stone) and level.

A second trail, called the Cove Trail, features 1.1 miles (1.8 km) of nature that explore the woods in the southern section of the park's lakeshore near the environmental center. The trail starts off at mile 0.7 of the main Perimeter Trail and ends at the picnic area next to the environmental center. Binoculars are recommended for sightseeing of wildlife in this area.

=== Perimeter Trail ===
Starting off at the parking lot on the southern section of the park, the perimeter trail runs in a westerly fashion and along Windeler Road until it reaches a wetlands area where it takes a sharp northerly turn. Continuing north/northwest, it passes by the environmental center, located near milepost 1.3. Passing the environmental center parking lot, the trail continues parallel to the driveway that leads to the environmental center parking lot, where it makes a sharp turn northeast to run parallel to Georgia Tavern Road, a county road that roughly serves as the western boundary of the Park. Moving northeasterly long Georgia Tavern Road, the trail leads to Chestnut Point where parking is available for nearby recreational fishing. The trail continues to run northeasterly to milepost 2 where it starts to run east towards milepost 3 and alongside Peskin Road and Southard Avenue. Past milepost 3 (and roughly around mile 3.3) the trail crosses the main utility service road of the Manasquan Water Supply System, after which it makes a sharp southern turn to run alongside Manassa Road. It then becomes a considerably narrower trail having a width no greater than 8 feet in the area near milepost 4, but expands again to some 20 feet wide as it reaches its end at milepost 5 in the area of the visitors parking lot. Mileposts are marked to the mile.

The following table lists some of the facilities, services, and features along the perimeter trail (Note: Except for the posted wooden milepost markings, all other mileage shown are approximations):

| Milepost | Facility, Service, or Feature |
|---|---|
| 0.0 | MILEPOST MARKER (START) |
| 0.1 | Johnny-on-the-spot toilets |
| 0.2 | Road to Park Ranger's Home |
| 0.3 | Yield sign |
| 0.5 | Bridges (2) |
| 0.6 | Cove Trail entrance |
| 0.7 | Resting bench - Larry Rispoli |
| 0.8 | Dike/bridge |
| 0.9 | Resting bench |
| 1.0 | MILEPOST MARKER |
| 1.1 | Resting bench - The Taub Family/Shortcut trail to Environmental Center |
| 1.2 | Cove Trail crossing |
| 1.3 | Environmental Center and parking lot/Park map |
| 1.4 | Georgia Tavern Road |
| 1.5 | Dike |
| 1.7 | Chestnut Point parking lot/Johnny-on-the-Spot toilets/Large Park map |
| 1.8 | Dike/fishing pier |
| 1.9 | Resting bench - Arlene Wishengrad |
| 2.0 | MILEPOST MARKER |
| 2.2 | Yield sign/Johnny-on-the-spot toilet |
| 2.4 | Wildlife observation blind |
| 2.5 | Resting bench - Gary P. Racich |
| 3.0 | MILEPOST MARKER |
| 3.5 | Dam road crossing |
| 3.7 | Steel bridge |
| 3.8 | Johnny-on-the-Spot toilet |
| 3.9 | Resting bench - Mandi Reo, et al. |
| 4.0 | MILEPOST MARKER |
| 4.4 | Vehicular Gate |
| 4.5 | Service driveway/Park map/Bear Swamp Connector Trail (across Old Tavern Road) |
| 4.6 | Vehicular Gate/Yield sign/Lakeside trail entrance |
| 5.0 | MILEPOST MARKER |
| 5.1 | Visitor's western parking area (END) |

=== Cove Trail ===
This trail (marked in green) starts at milepost 0.6 of the Perimeter Trail. The trail is 1.1 miles long, crosses the Perimeter Trail at mile post 1.2, and ends at the Environmental Center. It is very narrow and must be hiked in single-file formation. Its course is also more challenging than the perimeter trail, which is mostly flat. Some mud puddles may be encountered on this trail as it does not receive maintenance comparable to the perimeter trail. It does not have a gravel or quarry stone base; the path of this trail is just the ground itself in its natural form. The Cove Trail is considered a nature trail; it makes its way around a pond/wetlands in the southern section of the park. It has two bridges, two boardwalks (over muddy areas), and one wildlife viewing area.

=== Wetlands Spur/Lakeside Trail ===
The parking lot at the eastern end of the visitor center (the lot used by trailers carrying water crafts using the reservoir's lake) opens to a trail that leads to the lake and which eventually connects to the eastern portion of the perimeter trail. It is officially called the Wetlands Spur. Its length is 0.2 mile. Walking this trail, it first offers a picnic area (with a Johnny-on-the-spot nearby) and a wildlife observation blind and, continuing in an easterly fashion, this trail provides access to the lake's shore for sightseeing and fishing. Continuing the trail is a small pedestrian wooden bridge followed by a resting bench facing the lake. Continuing on, the trail comes to an end when it connects to the perimeter trail.

=== Bracken Trail ===
The unassuming entrance to this little trail is behind the Environmental Center. The trail is about 0.2 mile long, runs counter-clockwise (when starting from behind the environmental center) and ends at the environmental center's parking lot, behind the large concrete wall that doubles as the environmental center's welcome sign. Its base is quarry stone. The trail is narrow and meant for pedestrian (walkers/hikers) use only. This trail explores the lakeside area around the environmental center. The trail features about a dozen well-labeled indigenous flora and fauna, complete with their scientific name.

=== Bear Swamp Connector Trail ===
This 0.5-mile long trail is located at the eastern end of the park in a tract of land known as Bear Swamp Tract. It provides access from Howell Township's Oak Glen Park to the Perimeter Trail. It is approximately 8 feet wide and intended for casual walking. This trail leads away from the park and the hiker must use the same pathway to return to the Perimeter Trail. It is off mile 4.5 on the Perimeter Trail and hikers on the Perimeter Trail must cross Old Tavern Road to reach it.

== Environmental Center ==
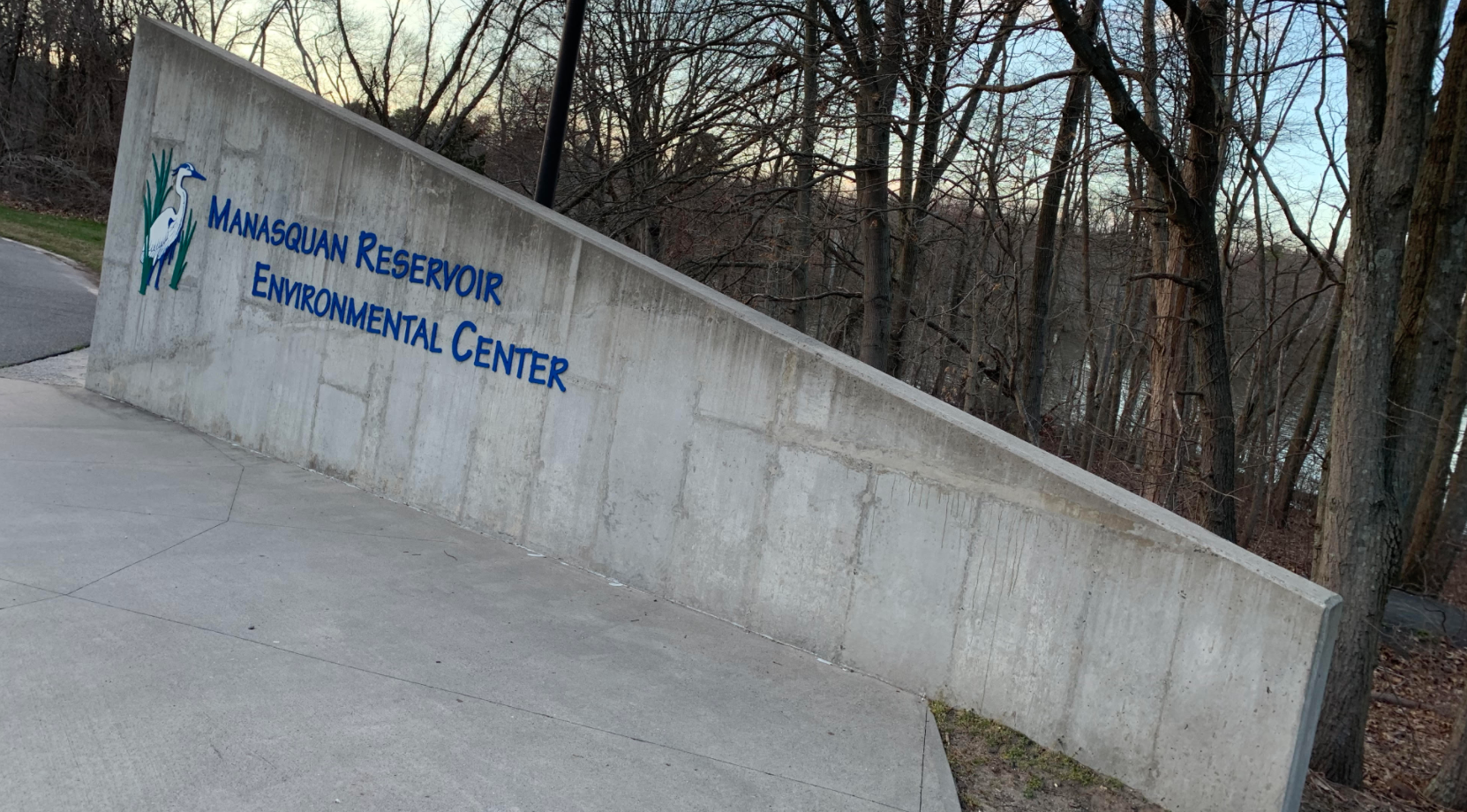
The main entrance for the Environmental Center

The environmental center is reachable by car and has its own parking lot. It contains displays of the fauna and fishery of the area, related instructional materials, and overlook windows to the surrounding land area and lake. There are restroom facilities at the center, but the center closes much earlier than the park itself. In the back of the environmental center, there is also a hidden loop trail nearby leading to the lake.

== Recreational activities ==
Visitors can bring their own water crafts, such as boats, kayak, canoes, etc., or they can avail themselves of the rowboat and group boat rides available to park visitors. The park also has kayaks for rent and use onsite at the lake. There are boat launching piers for entry into the lake. Fishing is permitted on the lake, and there are several favorite fishing spots. Horseback riding and biking is also permitted on the trails. The park also has a playground for children near the visitors center.

== Visitor center ==
A visitor center features restroom facilities, vending machines, park literature, and a small shop to purchase fishing supplies (a bait shop). There is also a hall with the look of a winter lodge. An observation deck, with on-deck pay-for-view binoculars, complements the second-floor features of the center. The visitor center has three parking lots. The center parking lot is closest to the center itself. The western lot provides easy access to the 5.1-mile perimeter trail, children's playground, and a small picnic area facing the lake. The eastern lot is intended for vehicles with watercraft trailers intending to use the craft launching ramp at the end of the lot and next to the visitors center.

== Wilderness reserve ==
A selected portion of the reservoir's property is designated as a wildlife reserve which protects aquatic fauna such as smallmouth bass, hybrid striped bass, tiger muskie, bullhead catfish and panfish. Notable bird and land animal species in the area include: great blue heron, osprey, double-crested cormorant, and the bald eagle. Also frogs, turtles, snakes, white-tailed deer, red fox, and raccoons.

== Reservoir ==
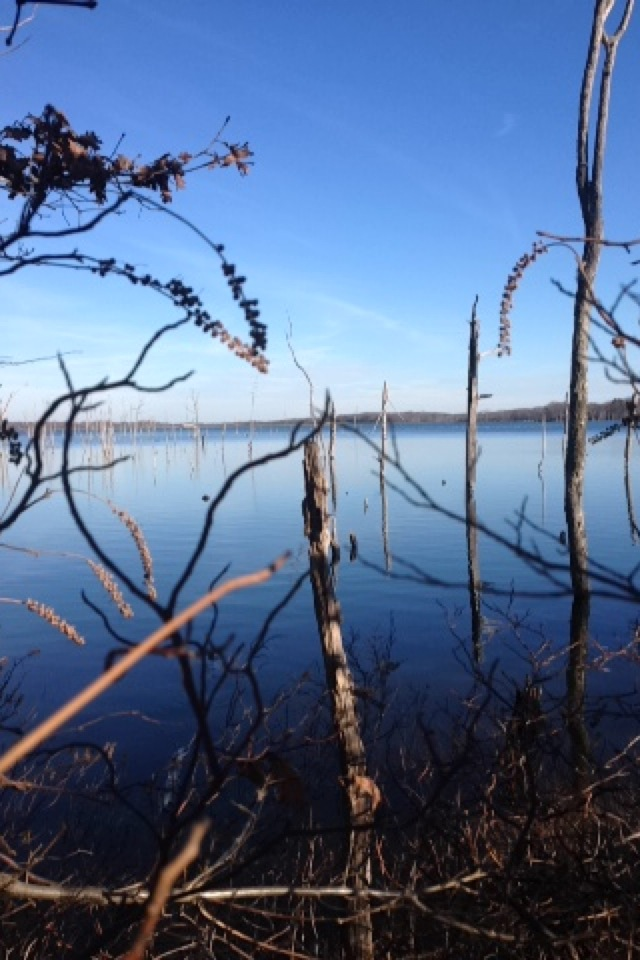
The reservoir.

The Manasquan reservoir, along with the BMUA, Glendola and Swimming River reservoirs provide a large portion of the drinking water for Central New Jersey. The reservoir is operated by the New Jersey Water Supply Authority and became operational in 1990. The reservoir was created by damming the Timber Swamp Brook. Several portions of wetland were destroyed in the making of the reservoir. By New Jersey state law, for all wetland destroyed by mankind, additional equivalent amounts of wetlands must be recreated artificially in the immediacy of the destroyed wetland. The reservoir has a four billion gallon capacity and a maximum depth of 40 feet (12 m). It can supply up to 30 million US gallons (110,000 m^{3}) of water per day.

== Memorial benches ==
Several of the benches along the perimeter trail have memorial plaques. Following is a listing with their contents:

- The bench at 0.7 miles bears a plaque from "The Taub Family memorializing The Great Dog Maggie". It contains a second plaque with these words: "We'll meet on the path in the woods, as the sunlight glistens through the trees, near the bridge where the water ripples on the rocks."
- The bench at 0.9 mile bears a plaque with the name Larry Rispoli.
- The bench at 1.1 miles bears two plaques. The first one says "To the memory of Our Tommy." The second one says "We will always love you, forever and for always, because you are our dear one."
- The bench at 1.9 miles bears a plaque with the name Arlene Wishengrad.
- The bench at 2.5 miles bears the name Gary P. Racich, with a second plaque containing the second verse ("I see skies of blue...") of the song What a Wonderful World.
- The bench at 3.9 miles bears these names: "Mandy Reo, Chelsea Heptig, Dannie Lucey, Hunkey Franklin, Pam Reo, Simone Reo" with the note "We will Love and Miss you Always."

There is also a resting bench at the Wetlands Spur to the memory of Robert Baxter III.
