= Tatum Park =

Public park in United States

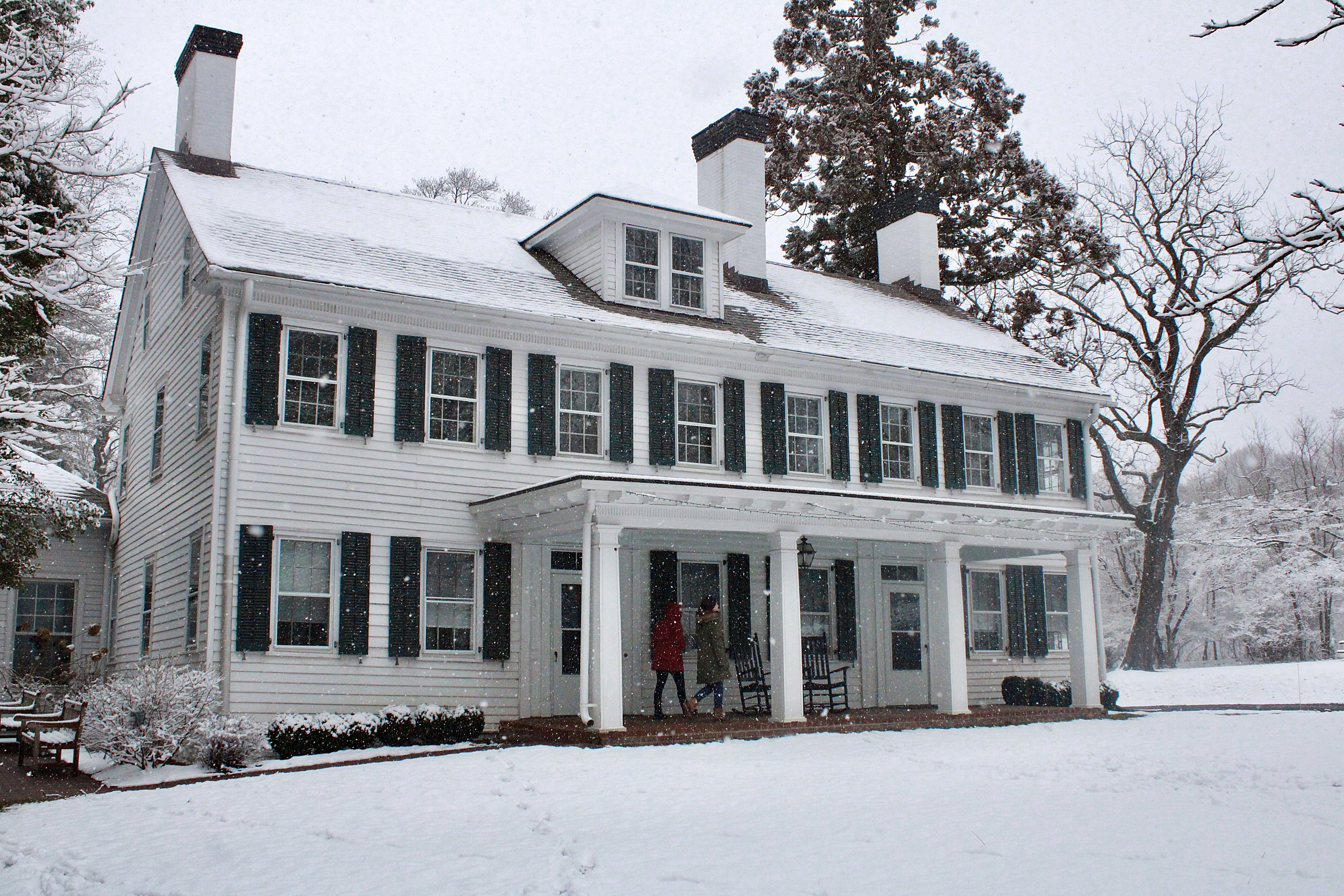
- Holland Activity Center

- Location within Monmouth County, New Jersey Location within New Jersey Location within the United States
- Location: 351 Red Hill Road; Middletown, New Jersey
- Coordinates: 40°23′8″N 74°8′19″W
- Area: 366 acres (1.48 km^{2})
- Created: 1973
- Operator: Monmouth County Park System

Tatum Park is a public park located at 351 Red Hill Road in Middletown Township, New Jersey. The 366-acre (1.48 km^{2}) park is operated by the Monmouth County Park System. The park was formerly an estate, originally purchased by Charles Tatum in 1905, a New York-based glass manufacturer and entrepreneur (who had a factory in nearby Keyport). The property was used as a summer residence for the entrepreneur's family.

After Charles' death, his daughter-in-law Genevieve donated 73 acres (30 ha) of their property to the county to create the park. Purchases made by the Land and Water Conservation Fund and the New Jersey Conservation Foundation, brought the park to its current size. The park features two visitor centers, The Holland Activity Center is located in the preserved Tatum Homestead, and the Red Hill Activity Center.

== General Park Information ==
Tatum park is a vast park that features a playground, two activity centers, and miles of scenic trails.

=== Holland Activity Center ===
The Tatum Family homestead is now the Holland Activity Center. It is located near the back entrance of the park on Holland Road. The historic homestead is also a venue hall, it can accompany 150 or so people for weddings, birthdays, anniversaries, and other occasions.

=== Red Hill Activity Center ===
The Red Hill Activity Center is the main visitors center for the park. It is located at the park's main entrance on Red Hill Road, outside is the main playground for the park and inside features rooms for workshops, classes, and auditions. Attached to the Red Hill Activity Center is also the Heath Wing, a museum that features African-American memorabilia from some of the county's earliest Black residents, that came during the Underground Railroad and early Great Migration periods from the American South. It was donated by the Heath family, in honor of Clinton Heath and (his wife) Mary Heath, in 1981. The Heath's, whom were born enslaved in the South, were instrumental in the early Black community in Monmouth County. Clinton Heath was a co-founder of the Clinton Chapel African Methodist Episcopal Zion Church in Middletown. The family also operated a farm, the Historic Heath Family Farm is located on 219 Harmony Road in Middletown, as it still offers produce, along with providing some reenactments of 19th century America.

=== Hiking ===
The park features more than 6 miles (9.7 km) of open hiking trails, through lush open fields into dense forests, utilized by hikers, joggers, bicyclists, and equestrians. The park features numerous different trail paths, ranging from easy to moderate in difficulty in its terrain and accessibility. It is one of the most elaborate and equally accessible among hiking trails in the park system, which has contributed it in being a popular hiking spot in Central Jersey.
