= J.M. Huber Corporation =

American corporation

- Type: Private
- Founded: 1883; 143 years ago
- Founder: Joseph Maria Huber
- Headquarters: Atlanta, Georgia, United States
- Key people: Glenn M. Fish (CEO)
- Number of employees: 4,000
- Website: huber.com

J.M. Huber Corporation is a corporation that produces consumer and industrial products. The J.M. Huber Corporation received the IMD-Lombard Odier Global Family Business Award for 2013.

== History ==
The J.M. Huber Corporation was founded in 1883 by Joseph Maria Huber, an immigrant from Prussia (now Germany).

== Overview ==
The J.M. Huber Corporation is headquartered in Atlanta, Georgia.
