= Clayton Park (New Jersey) =

County park in New Jersey, United States

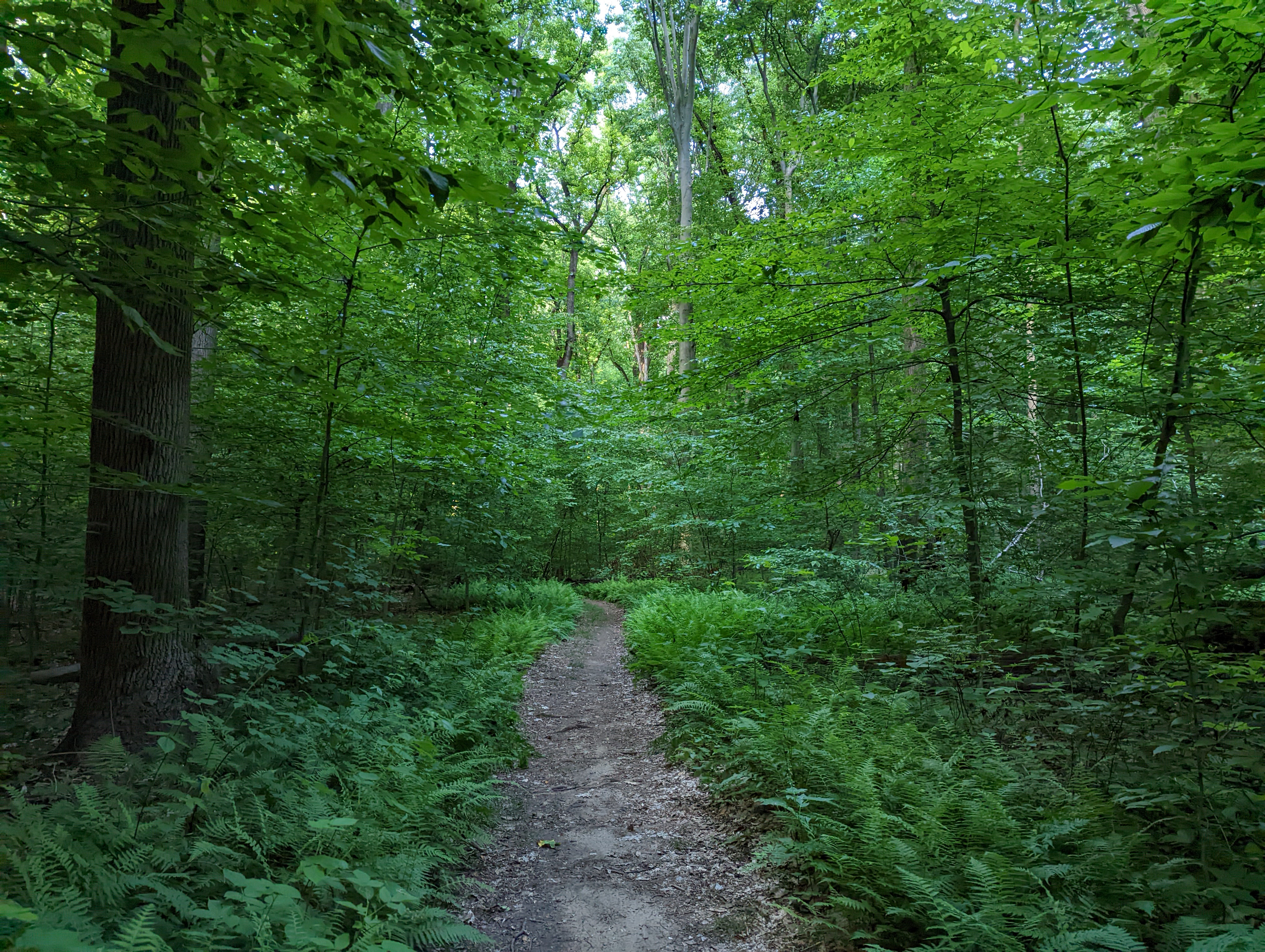
- Mature forest in Clayton Park

- Location within Monmouth County, New Jersey Location within New Jersey Location within the United States
- Type: Passive park
- Location: Upper Freehold Township, New Jersey, United States
- Coordinates: 40.155902°N 74.504500°W
- Area: 450 acres (1.8 km^{2})
- Created: 1979
- Owner: Monmouth County
- Operator: Monmouth County Park System
- Visitors: 32,400 (2021)
- Open: 7 AM - Dusk
- Status: Open all year
- Hiking trails: 5
- Habitats: Mixed Oak Forest
- Website: www.monmouthcountyparks.com

Clayton Park is a county park located in the community of Imlaystown in Upper Freehold Township, New Jersey. The 450-acre (180 ha) park preserves both fields and old-growth forests formerly owned by park's namesake, farmer Paul Clayton, who sold the park property to the Monmouth County Park System in 1979. The park's 6 miles (9.7 km) of trails are most often used for hiking, biking and horseback riding.

== History ==
The namesake of the park, Paul Clayton, purchased Clayton Farm in 1906, residing in a c. 1840 farmhouse with no running water, gas or electricity. Clayton and his wife eschewed modern farming methods, growing wheat, corn, potatoes and tomatoes on the 169 acres (68 ha) farm while raising two children. By 1971, the 88 year old Clayton was compelled to sell the land, but resisted the offers of developers and lumber companies. Clayton was convinced to sell the farm for below-market value to the county, on the condition that it would be preserved and he would be allowed to live there for the rest of his life. Funds were made available in 1979 by the New Jersey Department of Environmental Protection's Green Acres Program, and Clayton farm was sold to the county to become Clayton Park. In 1987, the park was expanded with a 240 acres (97 ha), 2.6 million dollars land purchase.

== Description ==
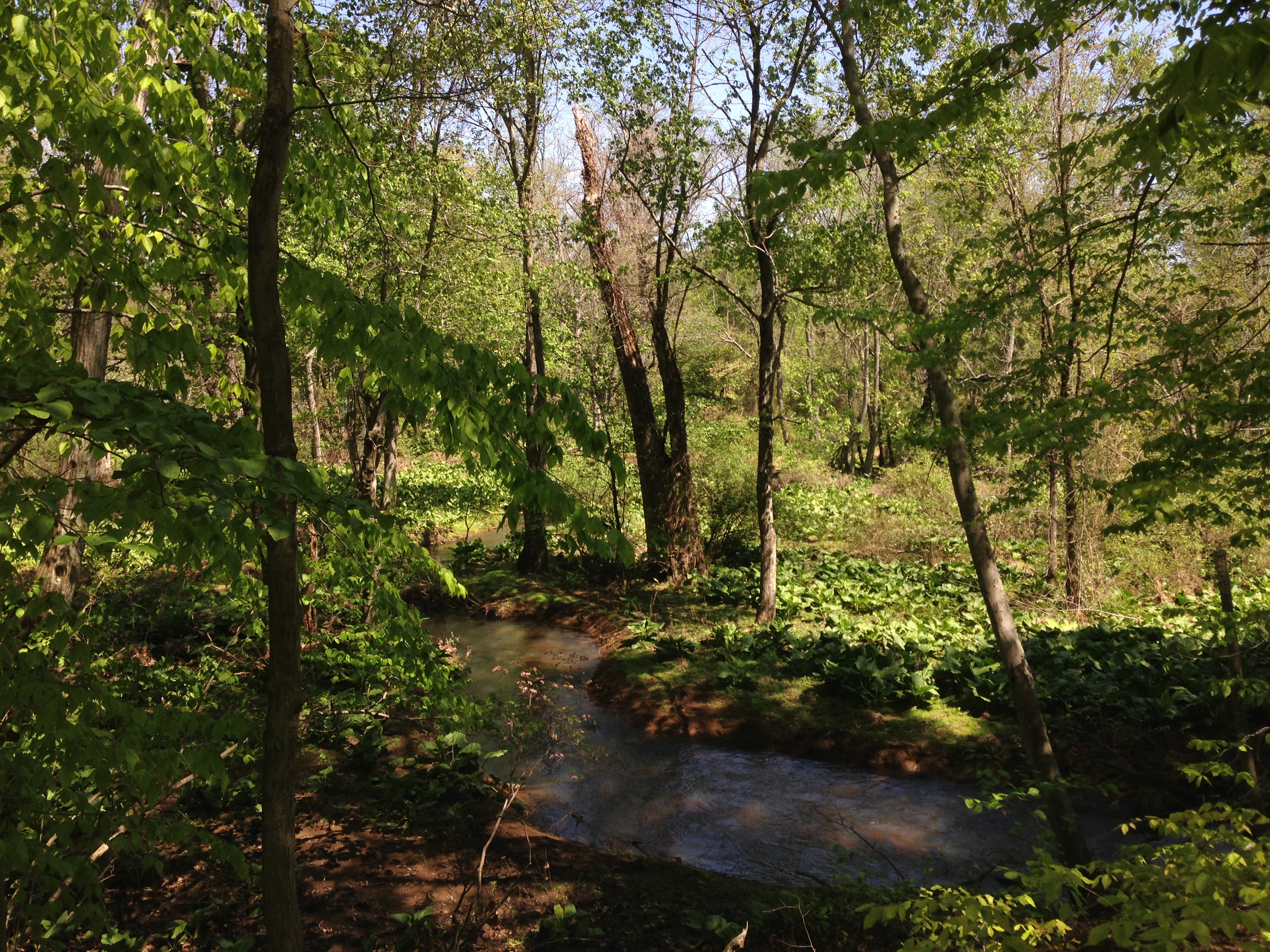
View across Doctors Creek, on the Doctors Creek trail.

The park is situated on the western end of a low cuesta ridge which extends across the county, terminating at Hartshorne Woods Park and the Navesink Highlands. The ridge gradually slopes down from 240 feet (73 m) to 110 feet (34 m), where the Doctor's Creek runs through a ravine, flowing into Imlaystown Lake at later into Crosswicks Creek.

The park is primarily made of mature forest, of which 78-acre (32 ha) has been designated old-growth forest by the Old-Growth Forest Network. The park's old growth forests are dominated by stately stands of beechs, red and white oaks and birchs, with shagbark hickorys and tulip poplars, and black oaks also being plentiful. The forest understory is considered one of the best in the county for wildflowers and contains a wide variety of perennial plants. The park also contains fields and a small man-made fishing pond, which a habitat to beavers, egrets, herons and turtles.

== Activities and facilities ==
The outstanding feature in the park is the natural environment of the park itself, traversed by nearly 7 miles (11 km) of trails open to hikers, bikers and equestrians. The park's waters, which include Doctor's Creek and Imlaystown Lake, are open to kayaking and fishing. The park also includes an activity center housed in the former Imlaystown school, which is used for educational programs.

== Gallery ==
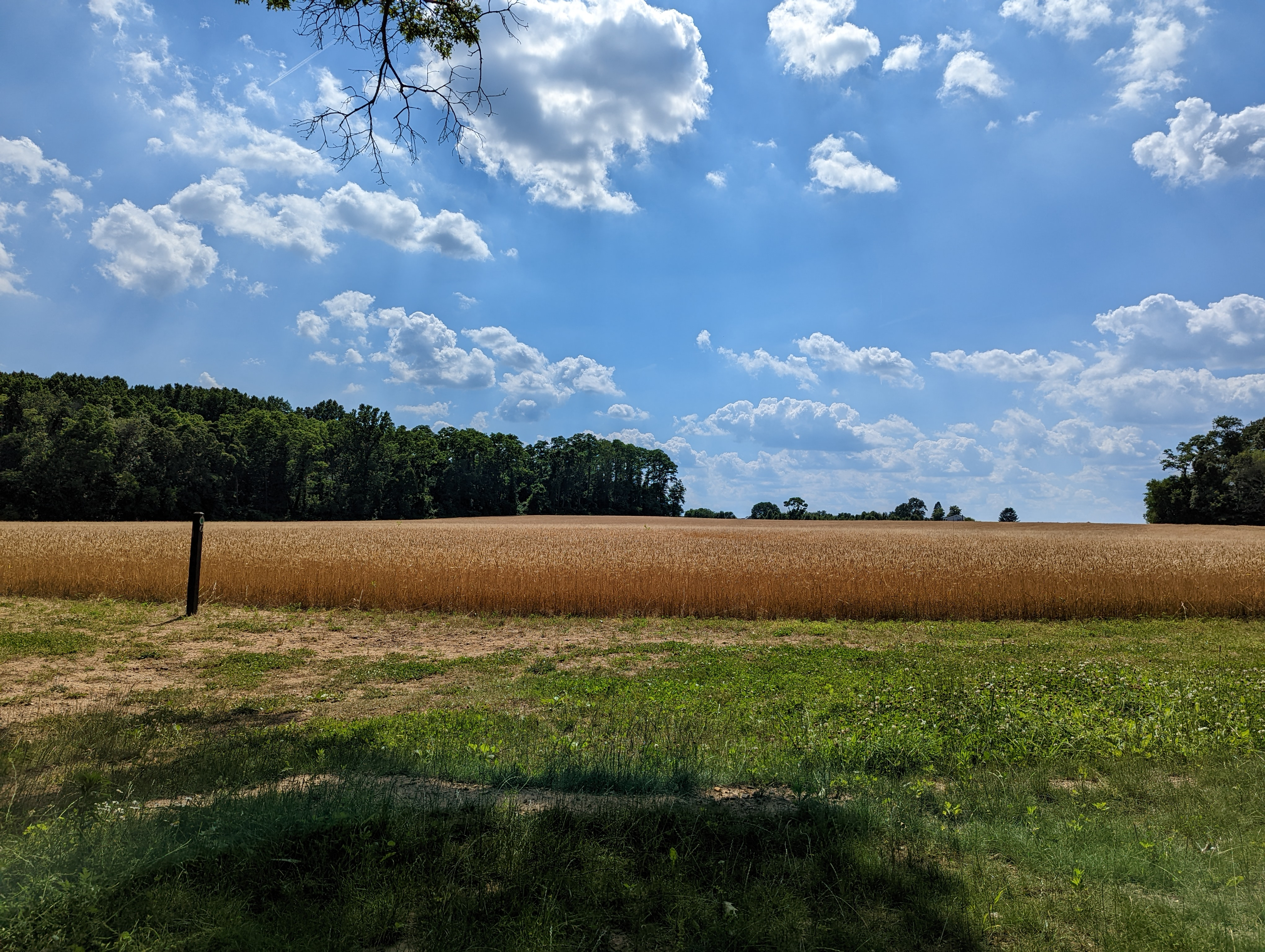
Open fields at the western end of Clayton Park.

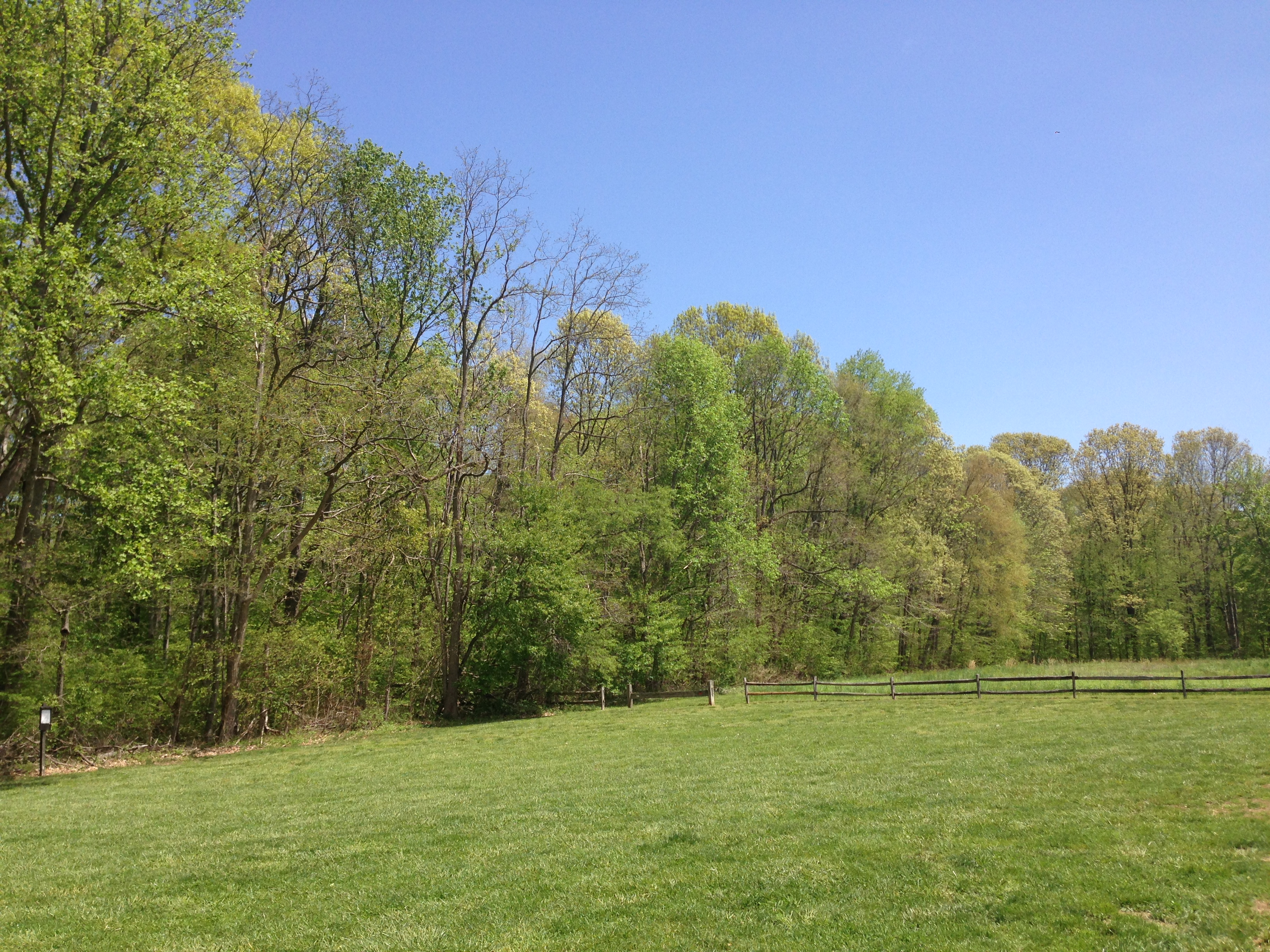
Main trailhead at Clayton Park

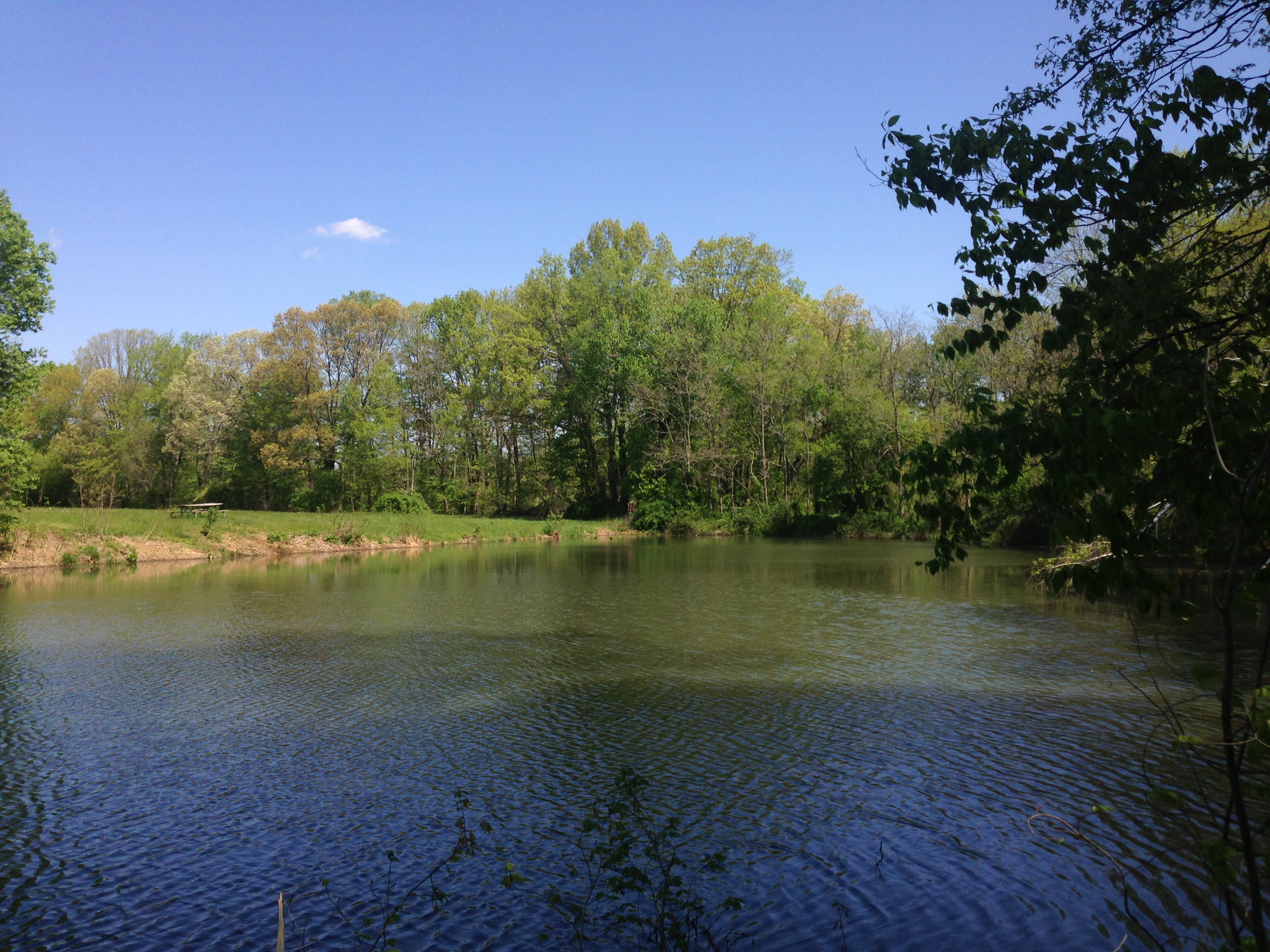
Man-made pond in Clayton Park
