= William Frenaye =

American architect

- Born: May 22, 1900; Colorado Springs, Colorado, United States
- Died: April 10, 1961 (aged 60); Montclair, New Jersey, United States
- Occupation: Architect

William Frenaye (May 22, 1900 – April 10, 1961) was an American architect. His work was part of the architecture event in the art competition at the 1932 Summer Olympics.

== Biography ==
Frenaye was born on May 22, 1900 in Colorado Springs, Colorado, United States. He studied at St. Paul's Academy, graduating in 1918. During World War I, he served in the coast artillery. In 1922, he earned a degree in mechanical engineering from Cornell University. He later became a partner in the architectural firm Frenaye & Howard.
