= Howell Park Golf Course =

Public 18-hole golf course in Howell Township, New Jersey

- Interactive map of Howell Park Golf Course
- 40.18°N 74.18°W

Club information
- Location: Howell, New Jersey, U.S.
- Established: 1970
- Type: Public
- Operator: Monmouth County Park System
- Tota holes: 18
- Website: http://www.howellpark.com
- Designed by: Frank Dwayne
- Par: 72
- Length: 6,916 yards
- Course rating: 73.0
- Slope rating: 126

Howell Park Golf Course is a public 18-hole golf course located in Howell Township, New Jersey (with a Farmingdale ZIP code). The course was designed by Frank Dwayne and opened in 1970.
