= Navesink =

The Navesink tribe were a group of Lenape who inhabited the Raritan Bayshore near Sandy Hook and Mount Mitchill in northern North Jersey in the United States.

Navesink may also refer to the following in the U.S. state of New Jersey:

- Navesink, New Jersey, a census-designated place and unincorporated area in Middletown Township, Monmouth County
- Navesink River, an estuary in Monmouth County
- Navesink Twin Lights, a lighthouse and museum
- Navesink Formation, a geological formation
- Navesink Highlands, a range of low hills in Monmouth County
- Monmouth Tract, also known as the Navesink Tract, an early colonial land grant
