= Navesink people =

The Navesink, or Navisink, (or Nave Sinck) were a group of Lenape who inhabited the Raritan Bayshore near Sandy Hook and Mount Mitchill in eastern New Jersey in the United States.

Their territory included the peninsula, as well as the highlands south of it, where they lived along its cliffs and creeks. Archeological artifacts have been found throughout this area. The Navesink shared the totem, a turtle, and spoke the same Lenape dialect, Unami, as their neighbors, the Raritan, and other groups such as the Hackensack and Tappan.

Early European contact was in the 16th and 17th centuries. The explorer Henry Hudson, an English sea captain first had contact with the Navesink among Native Americans, as recorded in journals from his ship, the Halve Maen on September 3, 1609. When crew went off the ship, they were attacked by Navesink. John Colman was killed and was said to be buried at what is now called Coleman's Point.

Cornelius Van Werckhoven, an investor in New Netherland purchased a tract called Nevesings in November 1651. At the time of the surrender of the Dutch provincial colony of New Netherland to the British in 1664, the Navesink sachem, or chief, was Passachquon. In 1668, English settlers led by Richard Hartshorne bought the whole peninsula from the Navesink Lenape and called it Portland Poynt.

Middletown Township, New Jersey is one of the oldest sites of European settlement in New Jersey., originally formed on October 31, 1693.

== See also ==
- Penelope Stout
- Navesink River
- Navesink Twin Lights
- Neversink River
