= North Middletown =

North Middletown is the name of the following places in the United States of America:

- North Middletown, Kentucky
- North Middletown, New Jersey
