= Raritan Bayshore =

Region of New Jersey

Coordinates: 40.441199°N 74.044418°W

The Raritan Bayshore is a region in central sections in the state of New Jersey. It is the area around Raritan Bay from The Amboys to Sandy Hook, in Middlesex and Monmouth counties, including the towns of Perth Amboy, South Amboy, Sayreville, Old Bridge, Matawan, Aberdeen, Keyport, Union Beach, Hazlet, Keansburg, Middletown, Atlantic Highlands, and Highlands. It is the northernmost part of the Jersey Shore, located just south of New York City. At Keansburg is a traditional amusement park while at Sandy Hook are found ocean beaches. The Sadowski Parkway beach area in Perth Amboy, which lies at the mouth of the Raritan River, was deemed the "Riviera of New Jersey" by local government. In recent years many of the beaches on the Bayshore area have been rediscovered and upgraded.

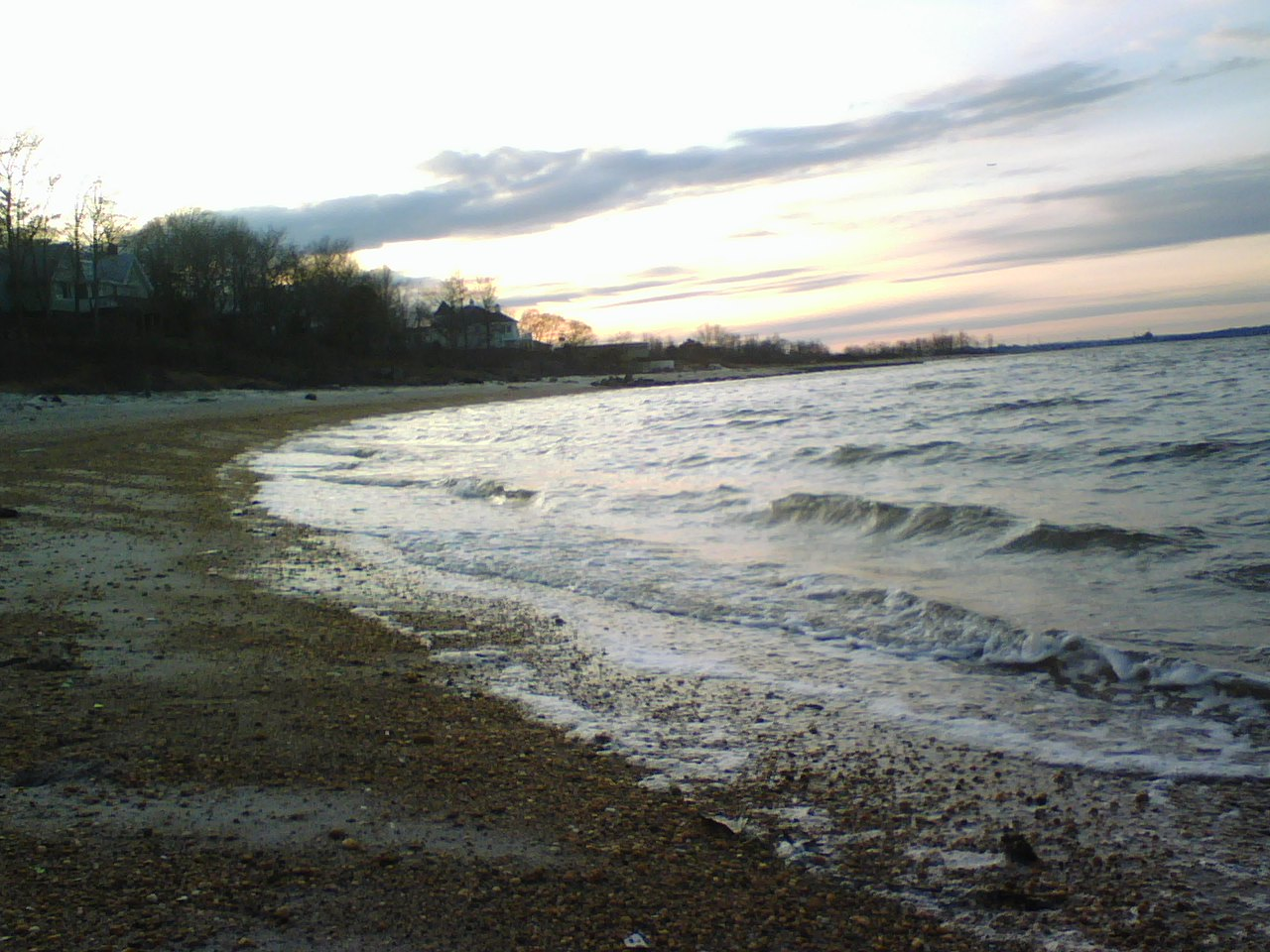
Cliffwood Beach at sunset, looking towards South Amboy

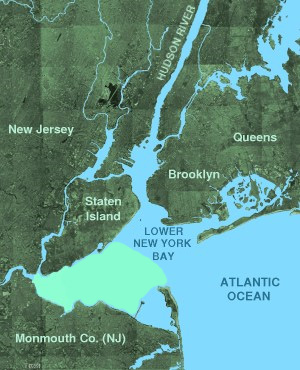
Raritan Bay

== Henry Hudson and the Half Moon ==
In September 1609, the Halve Maen (Dutch for Half Moon), anchored along the shores of the Raritan Bay, and remained for five days to explore the estuary and establish contact with local Lenape people (who later become known as the Navesink and Raritan). Four his crew were sent up the Arthur Kill and to Newark Bay. Upon their return they were attacked and one of them, John Colman was fatally shot by arrow. Taken ashore to be buried, the spot was christened Coleman's Point. The location Keansburg still bears the name.

== Popular attractions ==
Popular attractions in the Bayshore area include Keansburg Amusement Park and Runaway Rapids Waterpark in Keansburg, Mount Mitchill in Atlantic Highlands, and Longstreet Farm in Holmdel. There are also beaches and waterfronts in both of The Amboys, the Laurence Harbor section of Old Bridge, the Cliffwood Beach section of Aberdeen, Keyport, Union Beach, Keansburg, and the East Keansburg, Port Monmouth, Belford, and Leonardo sections of Middletown. There are also non-commercial boardwalks in Perth Amboy and Keansburg.

Because many of the towns date back to the 17th and 18th century, as well as the important naval history in the area, there are numerous historical locations throughout the Bayshore area. Historical attractions include Fort Hancock in Sandy Hook, the Twin Lights State Historic Site in Highlands, the Strauss Mansion in Atlantic Highlands, Portland Place and the Taylor-Butler House in Middletown, Longstreet Farm in Holmdel, the Burrowes Mansion in Matawan, the Thomas Warne Museum in Old Bridge, and the Kearny Cottage Museum, the Perth Amboy Ferry Slip, and Proprietary House in Perth Amboy. Additionally, there are various historical markers and sites from these early time periods, especially several from the Revolutionary War and the British retreat to Sandy Hook from the Battle of Monmouth.

== Bayshore Regional Strategic Plan ==
The Bayshore Regional Strategic Plan was an effort by nine municipalities in northern Monmouth County, New Jersey to reinvigorate the area's economy, especially along the Route 36 corridor along the Sandy Hook Bay.

Municipalities participating in the effort were Aberdeen, Atlantic Highlands, Hazlet, Highlands, Keansburg, Keyport, Matawan, Middletown and Union Beach.

In August 2006 a report was released, and Monmouth County was asked to vote to have the county planning board approve the plan the Bayshore organization has created.

This plan has since been replaced by the 2016 Monmouth County Master Plan, an effort to beautify, maintain, and revitalize Monmouth County. The new master plan combined four separate regional plans within the county to create one large master plan, fully taking into consideration what each plan had to offer.

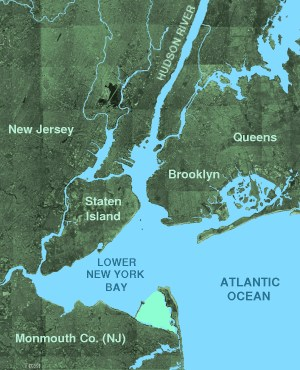
Sandy Hook Bay

Looking towards the Highlands from Sandy Hook

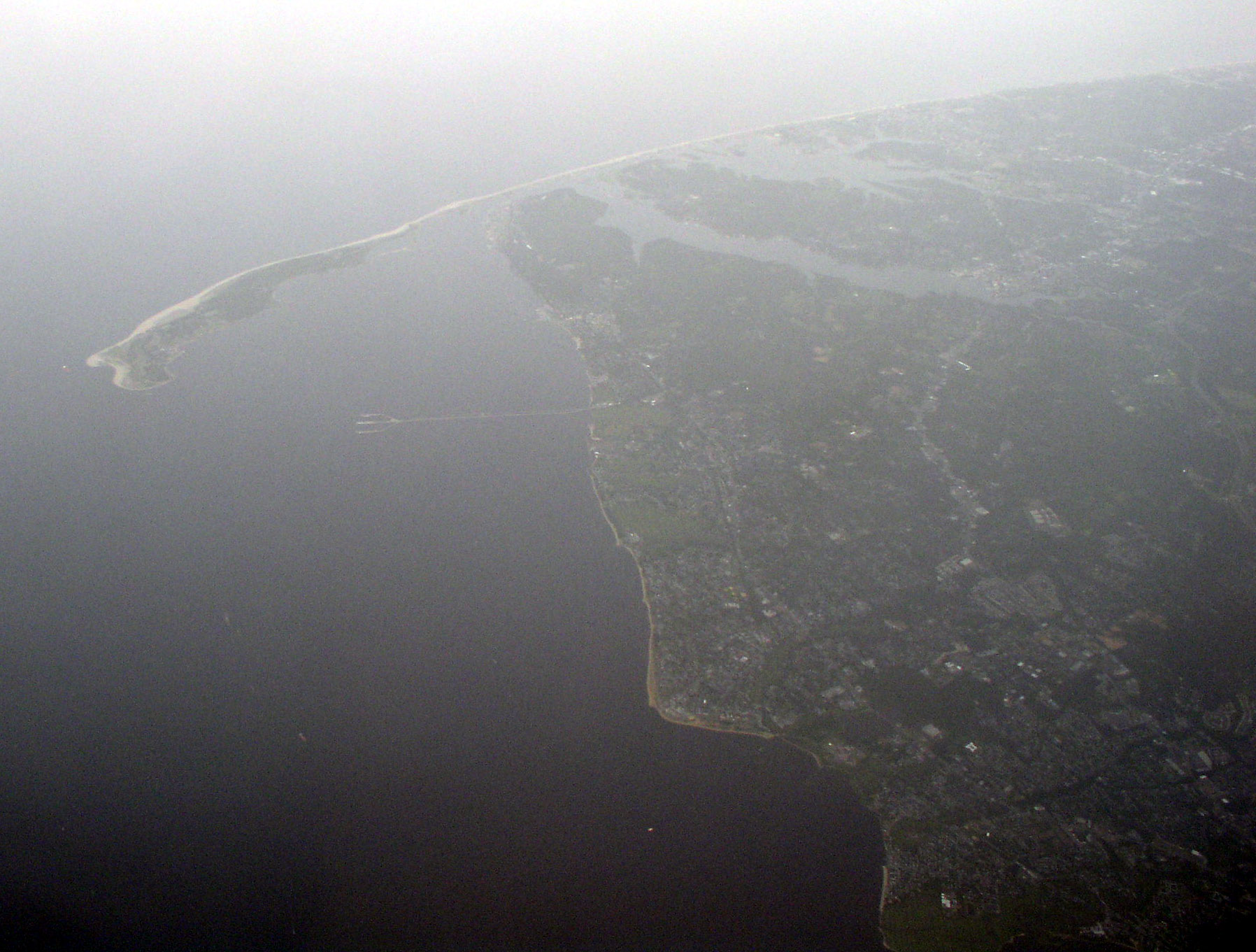
Oblique air photo facing east

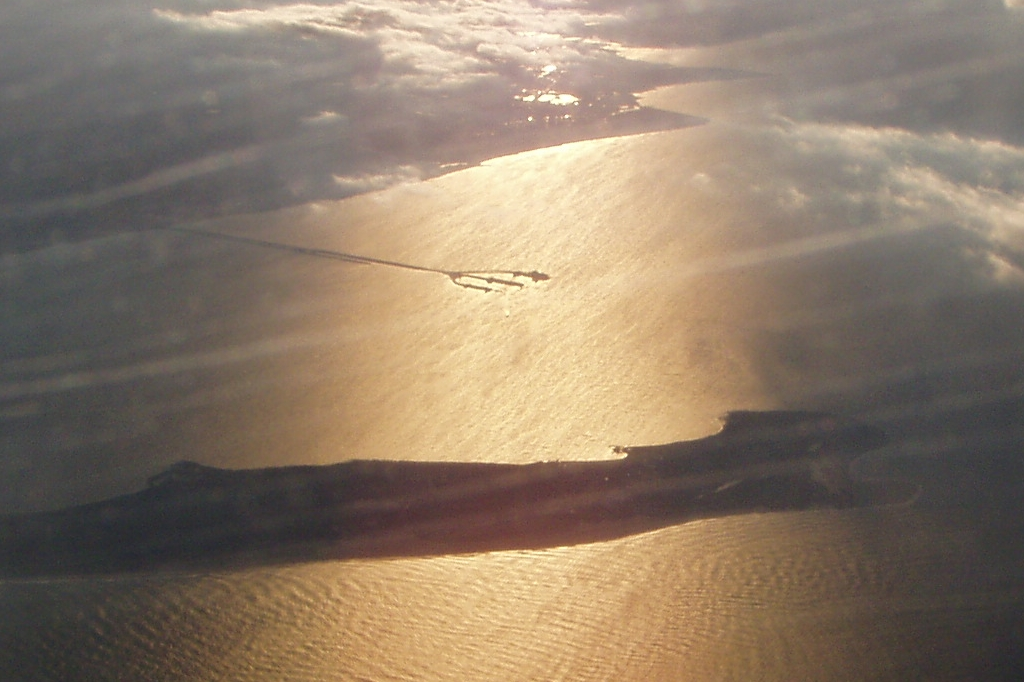
The US Navy piers at Naval Weapons Station Earle in Leonardo as seen from the air

== Sandy Hook Bay ==
Sandy Hook Bay is a triangular arm of the Raritan Bay, along the coast of northern New Jersey in the United States. It is formed along the south side of the Lower New York Bay by Sandy Hook, a spit of land that protects the bay from the open Atlantic Ocean. The bay provides a sheltered marina for pleasure craft, as well as a harbor for the United States Coast Guard. It is fed by the Shrewsbury River estuary. It is bounded on the west side by the Naval Weapons Station Earle pier.

== Nature, tourism, and recreation ==
The Henry Hudson Trail is a bicycling and hiking rail trail which runs parallel to the southern shore of Raritan Bay and connects the Bayshore communities to inland sections of Monmouth County. The trail starts in Freehold Borough and ends at Highlands, with missing links in Atlantic Highlands, Aberdeen/Matawan, and Marlboro.

The Bayshore area is mostly flat areas of beach, with the exception of the hills between the Navesink River and the Sandy Hook Bay. Mount Mitchill, a 266-foot (81 m) hill in Atlantic Highlands, is the highest. To the east of Mount Mitchill are the Twin Lights Lighthouse of Highlands, with unobstructed views of Sandy Hook and the New York City skyline. Hartshorne Woods Park is also located in the Monmouth Hills to the south on the banks of the Navesink River.

The Gateway National Recreation Area Sandy Hook Unit on the barrier peninsula includes two park sites:

- Fort Hancock served as part of the harbor's coastal defense system from 1895 until 1974 and contains 100 historic buildings and fortifications.
- Sandy Hook contains seven beaches, including Gunnison Beach, a "nude beach" by custom, as well as salt marshes and a maritime holly forest. Fishing and using hand-launched vessels are popular here.

The New Jersey Coastal Heritage Trail Route and Cheesequake State Park are also here.

== Lighthouses ==
- Chapel Hill Rear Range Light, Sandy Hook Bay (deactivated 1957)
- Conover Beacon, (located in the Leonardo section of Middletown)
- Great Beds Light, South Amboy
- Navesink Twin Lights, Highlands
- Sandy Hook Lighthouse, Sandy Hook.

== Transportation ==
=== Ferry service ===
Ferries to New York City and Exchange Place travel across the Lower New York Bay and enter the harbor at The Narrows, a trip that take approximately 40 minutes.

SeaStreak routes connect the towns of Atlantic Highlands and Highlands to the East River at Pier 11 at Wall Street and East 34th Street Ferry Landing in New York City. The Belford ferry slip Raritan Bayshore terminal with service to Paulus Hook Ferry Terminal in Jersey City and Wall Street-Pier 11 and West Midtown Ferry Terminal in New York City.

From Memorial Day weekend through Labor Day weekend, service is also provided to the public beaches in Sandy Hook a few times each day by SeaStreak.

=== North Jersey Coast Line ===
NJ Transit's North Jersey Coast Line crosses the Raritan River on River Draw between Perth Amboy and South Amboy continuing south to Aberdeen-Matawan, Hazlet, and Middletown.

=== Bus ===
- NJ Transit bus 48 travels to Elizabeth from Perth Amboy, with stops in Woodbridge, Carteret, and Rahway.
- NJ Transit bus 116 travels to New York City from Perth Amboy with stops in Woodbridge and Carteret.
- NJ Transit bus 131 travels to New York City with stops in Sayreville.
- NJ Transit bus 133 travels to New York City with stops in Old Bridge, Matawan, and Aberdeen.
- NJ Transit bus 135 travels to New York City from Freehold with stops in Matawan and Old Bridge.
- NJ Transit bus 815 travels between New Brunswick and Woodbridge Center Mall with stops in various towns including Perth Amboy and South Amboy.
- NJ Transit bus 817 travels between Middletown and Perth Amboy, with stops in Keansburg, Hazlet, Union Beach, Keyport, Aberdeen, Old Bridge, and South Amboy.
- NJ Transit bus 834 travels to the Red Bank bus terminal with stops in Middletown, Atlantic Highlands, and Highlands.
- Academy Bus runs regular service in to points in New Jersey and New York City.

== See also ==
- Regions of New Jersey
- Jersey Shore
- Raritan Bay
- Raritan River
- Navesink River
- Shrewsbury River
- Manasquan River
- Barnegat Bay
