= Neversink =

Neversink may refer to:

== Places in the U.S. state of New York ==
- Neversink, New York, a town in Sullivan County
- Neversink Gorge, in Forestburgh
- Neversink Preserve, in Orange County
- Neversink Reservoir, a New York City Reservoir in the Town of Neversink
- Neversink River, a tributary of the Delaware River

== Other ==
- USS Neversink, a pseudonym for the USS United States (1797) applied by author Herman Melville
- A short story in the collection When the Nines Roll Over by David Benioff

== See also ==
- Navesink (disambiguation)
