= Matawan, New Jersey =

Borough in northern Monmouth County, New Jersey, US

- Borough
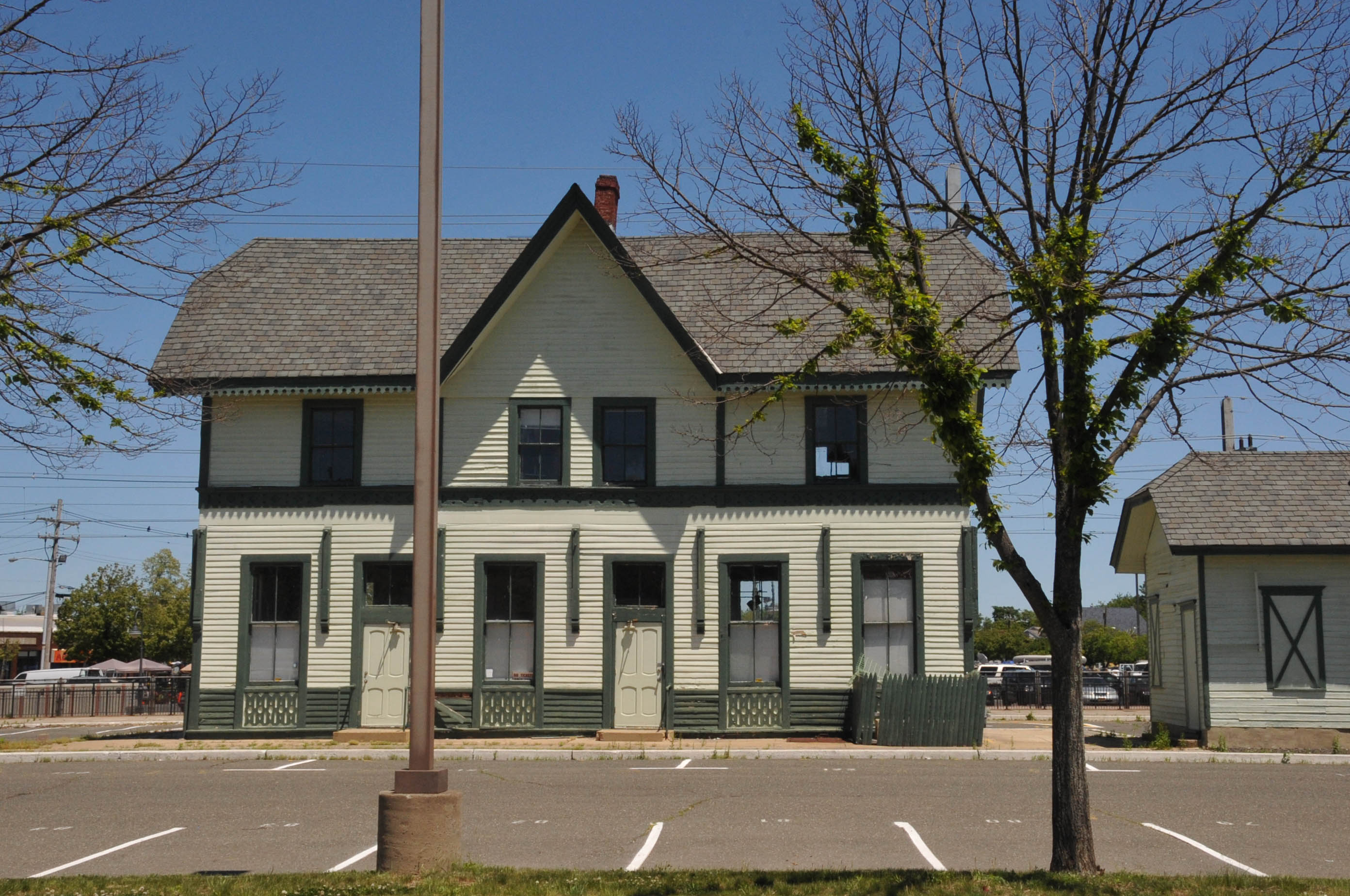
- The former Matawan Station

- Seal

- Map of Matawan in Monmouth County. Inset: Location of Monmouth County highlighted in the State of New Jersey.

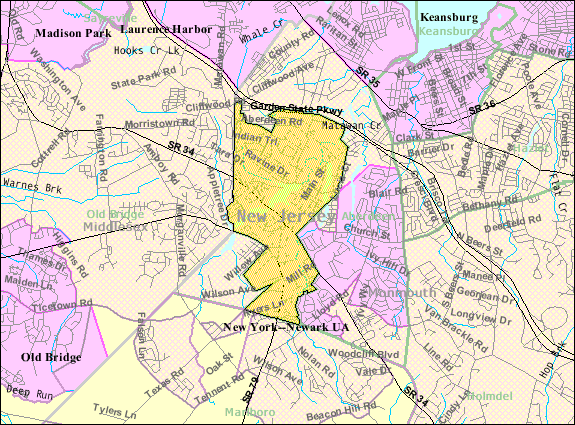
- Census Bureau map of Matawan, New Jersey

- Location in Monmouth County Location in New Jersey Location in the United States
- Coordinates: 40.4110°N 74.2365°W
- Country: United States
- State: New Jersey
- County: Monmouth
- Incorporated: June 28, 1895

Government
  - Type: Borough
  - Body: Borough Council
  - Mayor: Joseph Altomonte (D, term ends December 31, 2027)
  - Administrator: Ryan L. Michelson
  - Municipal clerk: Karen Wynne

Area
  - Total: 2.41 sq mi (6.24 km^{2})
  - Land: 2.27 sq mi (5.87 km^{2})
  - Water: 0.14 sq mi (0.37 km^{2}) 5.89%
  - Rank: 381st of 565 in state 25th of 53 in county
- Elevation: 10 ft (3.0 m)

Population (2020)
  - Total: 9,565
  - Estimate (2023): 9,704
  - Rank: 252nd of 565 in state 21st of 53 in county
  - Density: 4,221.1/sq mi (1,629.8/km^{2})
  - Rank: 146th of 565 in state 15th of 53 in county
- Time zone: UTC−05:00 (Eastern (EST))
  - Summer (DST): UTC−04:00 (Eastern (EDT))
- ZIP Code: 07747
- Area code: 732
- FIPS code: 3402544520
- GNIS feature ID: 0885293
- Website: matawanborough.com

Matawan (/mætəwɑːn/) is a borough in Monmouth County, in the U.S. state of New Jersey. A historic community located near the Raritan Bay in the much larger Raritan Valley region, Raritan Bayshore the borough is a commuter town of New York City within the New York Metropolitan Area. As of the 2020 United States census, the borough's population was 9,565, an increase of 755 (+8.6%) from the 2010 census count of 8,810, which in turn reflected a decline of 100 (−1.1%) from the 8,910 counted in the 2000 census.

Matawan was part of the Bayshore Regional Strategic Plan, an effort by nine municipalities in northern Monmouth County to reinvigorate the area's economy by emphasizing the traditional downtowns, dense residential neighborhoods, maritime history, and the natural beauty of the Raritan Bayshore coastline. The plan has since been integrated into the 2016 Monmouth County Master Plan. Matawan is a part of the New Jersey Transit Village Initiative, a type of residential-focused transit-oriented development focused around the Aberdeen-Matawan train station.

== History ==
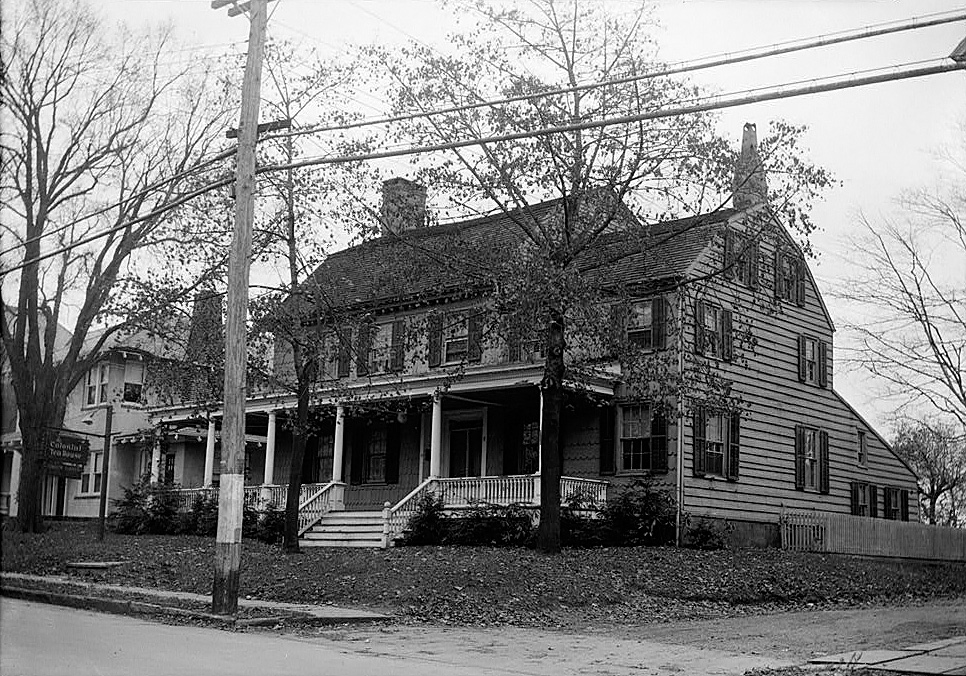
Maj. John Burrowes Mansion on Main Street

The Lenape Native Americans called the area "Mechananienk", which gave rise to the area being called "Matovancons" by Dutch settlers, from which derives the name "Matawan". The name may derive from a Lenape language word meaning "where two rivers come together" or it may originate from the Southern Unami Matawonge, "bad riverbank" or "bad hill", a possible reference to bluffs along Raritan Bay which were subject to erosion and collapse prior to the construction of a seawall in the 1970s. Another possible source is Matawan, Northern Unami for "bad fog", which may have referred to fog generated on Raritan Bay. Other possible meanings are "magician", "charmed skin" or "it arrives in a lake".

The community was established by Dutch settlers in the 17th century (Matawan celebrated a tricentennial in the 1980s). In 1686, Scotch-Irish settlers from New Hampshire later named the town New Aberdeen, and later Mount Pleasant. The town consisted with a church and a few houses around where southern Main Street and Freneau Avenue are. Neighboring Matawan Township reused the historic name in the 1970s when it changed its name to Aberdeen Township. As docks were built along Matawan Creek, which led to the area being called Middletown Point, which helped increase trade and commerce in the town. By the mid 18th century, the town became the main point of water-bound export and entry for Monmouth County. Over the course of the 18th century, the main center of the town moved north toward where it is today on Main Street. Some of Monmouth County's wealthiest merchants and tradesmen made their homes along Main Street during this time, many of which remain today.

On May 27, 1778, the Burrowes Mansion, which was built in 1723 and located on Main Street, and sold to wealthy grain merchant John "Corn King" Burrowes Sr. in 1769, was the site of a skirmish between the Patriots and the British during the Revolutionary War. The mansion is the site where the first New Jersey Company of the Continental Army formed, as John Burrowes Jr. trained local militia in his front yard. Local Patriots used whaleboats stored in Lake Matawan to attack British ships in the Raritan Bay. In response, British General Cortlandt Skinner, leading his Loyalist "Skinner's Greens", attacked Matawan with the (successful) intention of burning down the warehouses and mills owned by Burrowes and to capture Burrowes Jr. 200 Greens made their way from Sandy Hook, and greatly outnumbered the Matawan Patriots. Burrowes Jr. was able to avoid capture by swimming across Matawan Creek and hide, however Burrowes Sr. and several other Patriots were captured. Nearby, a house on Ravine Drive was owned by Samuel Forman, a wealthy merchant and Continental Army colonel and business partner with John Burrowes Sr. Forman had three sons, all of which became officers in the Continental Army, with the oldest Johnathan becoming a general. Of his four daughters, two married prominent local men, with Margaret marrying John Burrowes Jr. (where she was attacked by the loyalists during the skirmish at the Burrowes Mansion) and Eleanor marrying Philip Freneau, who was known as the "Poet of the Revolution". On May 23, 1779, there was another skirmish between the American militia and British troops near the Forman house, and the militia successfully forced the British to retreat down a hill and swim across the Matawan Creek into the Raritan Bay. The house became nicknamed the "Old Hospital" because many wounded soldiers were cared for in the house. In 1795, Philip Freneau established Monmouth County's first newspaper, the Jersey Chronicle. In the 1830s, with the invention of the steamboat, Matawan grew and prospered, as it allowed for goods to be more accessible to the New York regional market.

Between 1820 and 1870, property owners began subdividing their land, which led to a building boom with various new streets and homes opening up surrounding Main Street. Midway Alley, now Jackson Street, was opened in 1821 from Ravine Drive to Church Street. In 1833, Wycoff and Spring Streets were opened. In the 1840s Washington, Monroe, Franklin, Part of Jackson, Little, North, South, and Mill Streets were opened along with Rabbit Lane and Steamboat Alley. Broad Street, which used to be known as Second Street, was opened between Church and South Streets as well as a short piece off Little Street. By 1852 it was extended from Little to South Street and had been renamed Broad Street. The 1850s also saw the opening of Orchard, Center, Stillwell (then Division) and High Streets and Park Ave (then New St.) In the 1860s Clinton and Atlantic Streets were opened, as well as Hoyt Street and Johnson Avenue. Between 1830 and 1860, lumber mills, shipping warehouses, brickyards, and a ceramic industry which focused on pottery, stoneware, and tile were established. In 1865, due to postal confusion with Middletown, the Middletown Point post office was renamed "Matawan", to reflect the name of the Township. In 1869, David Bell began publishing the weekly Matawan Journal newspaper. Matawan's current character on Main Street formed during the late 19th century as schools, banks, stores, churches, and dwellings were formed on and around Main Street. The Matawan Train Station (later renamed Aberdeen-Matawan when the new station building was built on the Aberdeen side) was established in 1875, which helped sustain the town's prominence as a transportation center as Matawan Creek began silting, which led to a decline in ship commerce.

In 1857, the town of Middletown Point was renamed to Matavan Township after it was officially incorporated, being carved from Raritan Township, and was named after Matawan Creek. In 1882, Matavan was renamed Matawan. In 1883, a referendum to establish Matawan as a borough failed 93–79. In 1885, a referendum was held again, passing 144–133, although this was followed by years of opposition to the change. Matawan Borough was formed on June 28, 1895, from portions of Matawan Township (now Aberdeen Township), based on the results of a referendum held that day. Matawan expanded with portions of Matawan Township in 1931 and 1933, and from Madison Township (now Old Bridge Township) in 1939.

Despite being 11 miles (18 km) from the Atlantic Ocean, Matawan was the site of three shark attacks on July 12, 1916, in Matawan Creek, causing two deaths. They closely followed an attack in Beach Haven on July 1 and one in Spring Lake on July 6 that were all part of the Jersey Shore shark attacks of 1916. Today, there is a shark mural located in Matawan Creek visible off High Street. The attacks reportedly served as inspiration for the book Jaws and movie of the same name.

In 1894, an eight-room brick school building was built on the corner of Broad Street and South Street. In 1901, the most disastrous fire in Matawan history destroyed six buildings in the most major part of the business district. In 1923, Lake Matawan was created by damming Gravelly Brook. In 1924, the Matawan High School was built in the same location due to overcrowding concerns at the old school. In 1928, Matawan Creek was dammed to create Lake Lefferts. Also in 1928, Memorial Park was established to honor World War I veterans. In 1929, The Phyllis Wheatley Club, an organization for black women, is formed with 23 members. In 1930, Henry S. Terhune gifted Terhune Park between Main and Broad Streets. In 1938, the current Post Office is built on Main Street. In 1954, the Matawan First Aid and Rescue Squad is established. In 1962, the current Matawan Regional High School was built on Atlantic Avenue in Matawan Township. For the previous two centuries, area surrounding Main Street and its immediate vicinity mostly consisted of farmland and woodland, but around the mid 20th century suburban development brought suburban divisions and highways into the town. In 1988, a Ceronics Inc manufacturing plant on Main Street was destroyed by a fire. In July 1988, the 82 year old Dell's Meat Market closed. In August 1988, Rose Hill Cemetery, which held many famous locals dating back to 1802, was restored. In September 1988, Matawan celebrated its 300th anniversary.

Matawan played an important role in aviation navigation history. In 1944, the first operational Visual Aural Range (VAR) was installed at Matawan. Designed in 1937 at the Bureau of Air Commerce's research center, this system operated in the VHF band around 63 mHz and was an incremental improvement over prior aviation navigation systems such as the four-course radio range. VAR was later redeveloped into VOR.

== Geography ==
According to the U.S. Census Bureau, the borough had a total area of 2.41 square miles (6.24 km^{2}), including 2.27 square miles (5.87 km^{2}) of land and 0.14 square miles (0.37 km^{2}) of water (5.89%). The borough is at the northwest corner of Monmouth County and is the second-highest part of Monmouth County.

Unincorporated communities, localities and place names located partially or completely within the borough include Freneau and Oak Shades.

The borough borders Aberdeen Township and the Morganville section of Marlboro Township in Monmouth County, as well as Old Bridge Township in Middlesex County. Matawan divides Aberdeen Township into two non-contiguous sections, with a small wedge-shaped exclave on the township's southwest corner separated from the rest of the township by a portion of Matawan located on the opposite side of Route 79.

== Demographics ==
Historical population
Census	Pop.	Note	%±
1880	1,437		—
1890	1,491		3.8%
1900	1,511		1.3%
1910	1,645		8.9%
1920	1,910		16.1%
1930	2,264		18.5%
1940	2,758		21.8%
1950	3,739		35.6%
1960	5,097		36.3%
1970	9,136		79.2%
1980	8,837		−3.3%
1990	9,270		4.9%
2000	8,910		−3.9%
2010	8,810		−1.1%
2020	9,565		8.6%
2023 (est.)	9,704	▲	1.5%
Population sources: 1880–1890 1890–1920; 1890–1910 1910–1930; 1940–2000 2000; 2010 2020

=== 2020 census ===
As of the 2020 census, Matawan had a population of 9,565. The median age was 39.7 years. 20.6% of residents were under the age of 18 and 15.0% of residents were 65 years of age or older. For every 100 females there were 95.2 males, and for every 100 females age 18 and over there were 91.9 males age 18 and over.

100.0% of residents lived in urban areas, while 0.0% lived in rural areas.

There were 3,849 households in Matawan, of which 30.2% had children under the age of 18 living in them. Of all households, 47.3% were married-couple households, 18.2% were households with a male householder and no spouse or partner present, and 26.8% were households with a female householder and no spouse or partner present. About 27.5% of all households were made up of individuals and 10.3% had someone living alone who was 65 years of age or older.

There were 4,010 housing units, of which 4.0% were vacant. The homeowner vacancy rate was 1.7% and the rental vacancy rate was 4.7%.

Racial composition as of the 2020 census
Race	Number	Percent
White	6,673	69.8%
Black or African American	764	8.0%
American Indian and Alaska Native	45	0.5%
Asian	602	6.3%
Native Hawaiian and Other Pacific Islander	2	0.0%
Some other race	536	5.6%
Two or more races	943	9.9%
Hispanic or Latino (of any race)	1,431	15.0%

=== 2010 census ===
The 2010 United States census counted 8,810 people, 3,358 households, and 2,280 families in the borough. The population density was 3,896.6 per square mile (1,504.5/km^{2}). There were 3,606 housing units at an average density of 1,594.9 per square mile (615.8/km^{2}). The racial makeup was 80.98% (7,134) White, 7.04% (620) Black or African American, 0.11% (10) Native American, 6.41% (565) Asian, 0.01% (1) Pacific Islander, 2.77% (244) from other races, and 2.68% (236) from two or more races. Hispanic or Latino of any race were 10.77% (949) of the population.

Of the 3,358 households, 32.3% had children under the age of 18; 53.0% were married couples living together; 10.6% had a female householder with no husband present and 32.1% were non-families. Of all households, 24.7% were made up of individuals and 7.7% had someone living alone who was 65 years of age or older. The average household size was 2.59 and the average family size was 3.15.

22.6% of the population were under the age of 18, 8.1% from 18 to 24, 29.7% from 25 to 44, 28.0% from 45 to 64, and 11.7% who were 65 years of age or older. The median age was 38.3 years. For every 100 females, the population had 94.5 males. For every 100 females ages 18 and older there were 90.8 males.

The Census Bureau's 2006–10 American Community Survey showed that (in 2010 inflation-adjusted dollars) median household income was $68,375 (with a margin of error of +/− $7,318) and the median family income was $85,677 (+/− $6,353). Males had a median income of $57,376 (+/− $10,034) versus $42,255 (+/− $14,121) for females. The per capita income for the borough was $39,773 (+/− $5,834). About 3.5% of families and 5.2% of the population were below the poverty line, including 9.6% of those under age 18 and 5.4% of those age 65 or over.

=== 2000 census ===
As of the 2000 United States census there were 8,910 people, 3,531 households, and 2,376 families residing in the borough. The population density was 3,909.1 inhabitants per square mile (1,509.3/km^{2}). There were 3,640 housing units at an average density of 1,597.0 per square mile (616.6/km^{2}). The racial makeup of the borough was 82.35% White, 6.53% African American, 0.02% Native American, 7.99% Asian, 0.02% Pacific Islander, 1.23% from other races, and 1.85% from two or more races. Hispanic or Latino of any race were 6.45% of the population.

There were 3,531 households, out of which 30.2% had children under the age of 18 living with them, 54.3% were married couples living together, 9.1% had a female householder with no husband present, and 32.7% were non-families. 25.6% of all households were made up of individuals, and 7.8% had someone living alone who was 65 years of age or older. The average household size was 2.52 and the average family size was 3.07.

In the borough the population was spread out, with 22.6% under the age of 18, 7.3% from 18 to 24, 36.4% from 25 to 44, 23.3% from 45 to 64, and 10.5% who were 65 years of age or older. The median age was 36 years. For every 100 females, there were 97.6 males. For every 100 females age 18 and over, there were 95.8 males.

The median income for a household in the borough was $63,594, and the median income for a family was $72,183. Males had a median income of $51,924 versus $37,113 for females. The per capita income for the borough was $30,320. About 3.8% of families and 5.4% of the population were below the poverty line, including 6.9% of those under age 18 and 7.3% of those age 65 or over.

== Arts and culture ==
Matawan was ranked by BusinessWeek magazine at #12 in the nation on their list of "The 50 Best Places to Raise Your Kids" in November 2007. In 2023, an analysis using FBI statistics on small town safety determined that Matawan was the 194th safest small town in the United States.

According to the Monmouth County Master Plan, Matawan has been designated as an upcoming Arts, Cultural, and Entertainment (ACE) Hub, which is defined as municipalities that have a high concentration of arts and cultural activities to serve as a destination for both visitors and locals, usually including an active nightlife scene in proximity to said cultural activities. Only eight towns in Monmouth County share this designation. Additionally, Matawan is a part of the MoCo Arts Corridor, an initiative to designate the towns along the North Jersey Coast Line as regional destinations for arts, with the ACE hubs being the more prominent points along the corridor.

Matawan has several community events throughout the year. The largest event, Matawan Day, takes place annually in October on Main Street, consisting of stands and booths hosted by numerous local businesses, organizations, and artisans; music, a DJ, and live performers; a beer and wine garden; food vendors and trucks; food eating contests; and numerous activities for kids. Between June and October, Matawan hosts a farmers' market every Friday in front of the municipal building. The town also hosts an annual town-wide yard sale in May and the "Blues and Cruise Night" annual car show in May. Matawan hosts an event for many holidays, including New Jersey's shortest Saint Patrick's Day Parade, an annual Easter egg hunt, an Arbor Day tree planting celebration, a Memorial Day parade, an annual 9/11 memorial service, Halloween home decorating contest and ghost tours, Thanksgiving turkey trots, and annual Christmas tree lighting and home decorating contest.

Matawan's primary historic site is the Maj. John Burrowes Mansion museum located on Main Street, a 1723 Georgian style mansion that housed Maj. John Burrowes, a Revolutionary War major. The mansion is the site where the first New Jersey Company of the Continental Army formed. During the war, the British attacked the site in 1778. It has been designated a part of the National Register of Historic Places since 1972. It was added to the New Jersey Register of Historic Places on March 17, 1972. Main Street and surrounding streets contains dozens of historical houses and buildings dating back to the 18th, 19th, and early 20th centuries. The architectural styles vary a lot, producing a great variety of styles to look at, including Greek Revival, Queen Anne, Italianate, Victorian Gothic, Victorian Stick, Folk Victorian, French Second Empire, Federal, Colonial, Beaux Arts, and Georgian styles. In nearby neighborhoods such as Claire Court and Tina Place off Franeau Avenue, all of the houses are modern bright, colorful, Victorian-style houses. Matawan Historical Society provides information about historical residents who lived in many of the houses and buildings, most of which are privately owned today.

== Parks and recreation ==
Matawan is the northern terminus of the middle segment of the Henry Hudson Trail, and the western terminus of the eastern section. Views of Lake Matawan are visible on the northern end along Main Street and Broad Street by Memorial Park, as well as on the southern end on the Little Street bridge, while the rest of it is bordered by houses or trees.

Matawan has ten parks within its borders, including:

- Lake Lefferts, a lake with a boat launch, fishing docks, and canoe, kayak, and paddleboat rentals
- Memorial Park, a park with several memorials, including local firemen, 9/11, a WW1 statue, the 1916 shark attacks, and a memorial wall commemorating veterans from WW2 onwards
- Gravelly Brook Park, a playground, soccer/baseball field, basketball courts, and bathrooms
- Clinton Street Youth Center, a basketball court, handball wall, and playground
- Jeremiah E. Hourihan Field, a ballfield and playground
- Joseph Penniplede Park, a basketball court, playground, and handball wall
- Terhune Park, a playground
- The Pocket Park, a small park next to the Post Office
- Toomer Baseball Field
- Freneau Baseball Field

== Government ==
=== Local government ===
Matawan is governed under the borough form of New Jersey municipal government, which is used in 218 municipalities (of the 564) statewide, making it the most common form of government in New Jersey. The governing body is comprised of the mayor and the borough council, with all positions elected at-large on a partisan basis as part of the November general election. A mayor is elected directly by the voters to a four-year term of office. The borough council includes six members elected to serve three-year terms on a staggered basis, with two seats coming up for election each year in a three-year cycle. The borough form of government used by Matawan is a "weak mayor / strong council" government in which council members act as the legislative body with the mayor presiding at meetings and voting only in the event of a tie. The mayor can veto ordinances subject to an override by a two-thirds majority vote of the council. The mayor makes committee and liaison assignments for council members, and most appointments are made by the mayor with the advice and consent of the council.

As of 2024, the mayor of Matawan is Democrat Joseph Altomonte, whose term of office ends December 31, 2027. Members of the Matawan Borough Council are Council President Deana Gunn (D, 2026), Arlan Feiles (D, 2026), Brian Livesey (D, 2025), Suzanne Reynolds (R, 2027), Charles Ross (R, 2027) and Steven Russell (D, 2025).

In July 2019, Brian Livesey was appointed to fill the seat expiring in December 2021 that become vacant following the death of David Vergaretti the previous month; Livesey will serve on an interim basis until the November 2019 general election, when voters will select a candidate to serve the balance of the term of office. In the November 2019 general election, Livesey ran and won a full three-year term while John Lazar was elected to serve the balance of Vergaretti's term of office.

=== Federal, state and county representation ===
Matawan is located in the 6th Congressional District and is part of New Jersey's 12th state legislative district.

For the 119th United States Congress, New Jersey's 6th congressional district is represented by Frank Pallone (D, Long Branch). New Jersey is represented in the United States Senate by Democrats Cory Booker (Newark, term ends 2027) and Andy Kim (Moorestown, term ends 2031).

For the 2026–2027 session, the 12th legislative district of the New Jersey Legislature is represented in the State Senate by Owen Henry (R, Old Bridge Township) and in the General Assembly by Robert D. Clifton (R, Matawan) and Alex Sauickie (R, Jackson Township).

Monmouth County is governed by a Board of County Commissioners composed of five members who are elected at-large to serve three-year terms of office on a staggered basis, with either one or two seats up for election each year as part of the November general election. At an annual reorganization meeting held in the beginning of January, the board selects one of its members to serve as director and another as deputy director.

As of 2025, Monmouth County's Commissioners are Director Thomas A. Arnone (R, Neptune City, 2025), Susan M. Kiley (R, Hazlet Township, 2027), Erik Anderson (R, Shrewsbury, 2026), Nick DiRocco (R, Wall Township, 2025), and Deputy Director Ross F. Licitra (R, Marlboro Township, 2026).

Constitutional officers elected on a countywide basis are Clerk Christine Giordano Hanlon (R, 2025; Ocean Township), Sheriff Shaun Golden (R, 2025; Howell Township) and Surrogate Rosemarie D. Peters (R, 2026; Middletown Township).

=== Politics ===
United States presidential election results for Matawan
Year	Republican		Democratic		Third party(ies)	
Year	No.	%	No.	%	No.	%
2024	2,601	54.12%	2,116	44.03%	89	1.85%
2020	2,410	48.11%	2,497	49.85%	102	2.04%
2016	2,183	50.84%	1,929	44.92%	182	4.24%
2012	1,732	46.57%	1,937	52.08%	50	1.34%
2008	1,983	48.01%	2,090	50.61%	57	1.38%
2004	2,081	52.16%	1,880	47.12%	29	0.73%
2000	1,566	44.04%	1,788	50.28%	202	5.68%
1996	1,329	40.28%	1,614	48.92%	356	10.79%
1992	2,653	55.03%	1,426	29.58%	742	15.39%

As of March 2011, there were a total of 5,315 registered voters in Matawan, of which 1,355 (25.5%) were registered as Democrats, 1,136 (21.4%) were registered as Republicans and 2,820 (53.1%) were registered as Unaffiliated. There were 4 voters registered as Libertarians or Greens.

In the 2012 presidential election, Democrat Barack Obama received 52.1% of the vote (1,937 cast), ahead of Republican Mitt Romney with 46.6% (1,732 votes), and other candidates with 1.3% (50 votes), among the 3,753 ballots cast by the borough's 5,667 registered voters (34 ballots were spoiled), for a turnout of 66.2%. In the 2008 presidential election, Democrat Barack Obama received 49.9% of the vote (2,090 cast), ahead of Republican John McCain with 47.3% (1,983 votes) and other candidates with 1.4% (57 votes), among the 4,188 ballots cast by the borough's 5,604 registered voters, for a turnout of 74.7%. In the 2004 presidential election, Republican George W. Bush received 52.3% of the vote (2,081 ballots cast), outpolling Democrat John Kerry with 47.3% (1,880 votes) and other candidates with 0.5% (29 votes), among the 3,978 ballots cast by the borough's 5,440 registered voters, for a turnout percentage of 73.1.

Gubernatorial election results for Matawan
Year	Republican		Democratic		Third party(ies)	
Year	No.	%	No.	%	No.	%
2025	1,857	49.64%	1,865	49.85%	19	0.51%
2021	1,733	56.21%	1,316	42.69%	34	1.10%
2017	1,318	52.14%	1,147	45.37%	63	2.49%
2013	1,638	68.19%	727	30.27%	37	1.54%
2009	1,639	58.39%	920	32.78%	248	8.84%
2005	1,321	50.13%	1,162	44.10%	152	5.77%

In the 2013 gubernatorial election, Republican Chris Christie received 68.2% of the vote (1,638 cast), ahead of Democrat Barbara Buono with 30.3% (727 votes), and other candidates with 1.5% (37 votes), among the 2,432 ballots cast by the borough's 5,678 registered voters (30 ballots were spoiled), for a turnout of 42.8%. In the 2009 gubernatorial election, Republican Chris Christie received 58.0% of the vote (1,639 ballots cast), ahead of Democrat Jon Corzine with 32.5% (920 votes), Independent Chris Daggett with 7.5% (213 votes) and other candidates with 1.2% (35 votes), among the 2,827 ballots cast by the borough's 5,377 registered voters, yielding a 52.6% turnout.

United States Senate election results for Matawan1
Year	Republican		Democratic		Third party(ies)	
Year	No.	%	No.	%	No.	%
2024	2,423	52.26%	2,106	45.43%	107	2.31%
2018	1,635	49.50%	1,539	46.59%	129	3.91%
2012	1,783	49.86%	1,724	48.21%	69	1.93%
2006	1,304	51.50%	1,151	45.46%	77	3.04%

United States Senate election results for Matawan2
Year	Republican		Democratic		Third party(ies)	
Year	No.	%	No.	%	No.	%
2020	2,395	48.36%	2,452	49.52%	105	2.12%
2014	1,050	49.00%	1,048	48.90%	45	2.10%
2013	776	49.94%	756	48.65%	22	1.42%
2008	1,910	49.48%	1,840	47.67%	110	2.85%

== Education ==
Matawan is part of the Matawan-Aberdeen Regional School District (MARSD), which also serves students from the neighboring community of Aberdeen Township. The district is a comprehensive system with seven schools, which includes one preschool for pre-kindergarten and kindergarten, three elementary schools for grades PreK–3, one school for grades 4–5, one middle school for grades 6–8 and a high school for grades 9–12. As of the 2022–23 school year, the district, comprised of seven schools, had an enrollment of 3,950 students and 352.3 classroom teachers (on an FTE basis), for a student–teacher ratio of 11.2:1. Schools in the district (with 2022–23 enrollment data from the National Center for Education Statistics) are Cambridge Park Elementary School with 266 students in grades PreK–K, Cliffwood Elementary School with 369 students in grades PreK–3, Ravine Drive Elementary School with 399 students in grades PreK–3, Strathmore Elementary School with 461 students in grades PreK–3, Lloyd Road Elementary School with 528 students in grades 4–5, Matawan Aberdeen Middle School with 795 students in grades 6–8 and Matawan Regional High School with 1,154 students in grades 9–12. The MARSD Central Offices are located at 1 Crest Way, in Aberdeen. Seats on the district's nine-member board of education are allocated based on the population of the constituent municipalities, with three assigned to Matawan.

== Transportation ==
=== Roads and highways ===
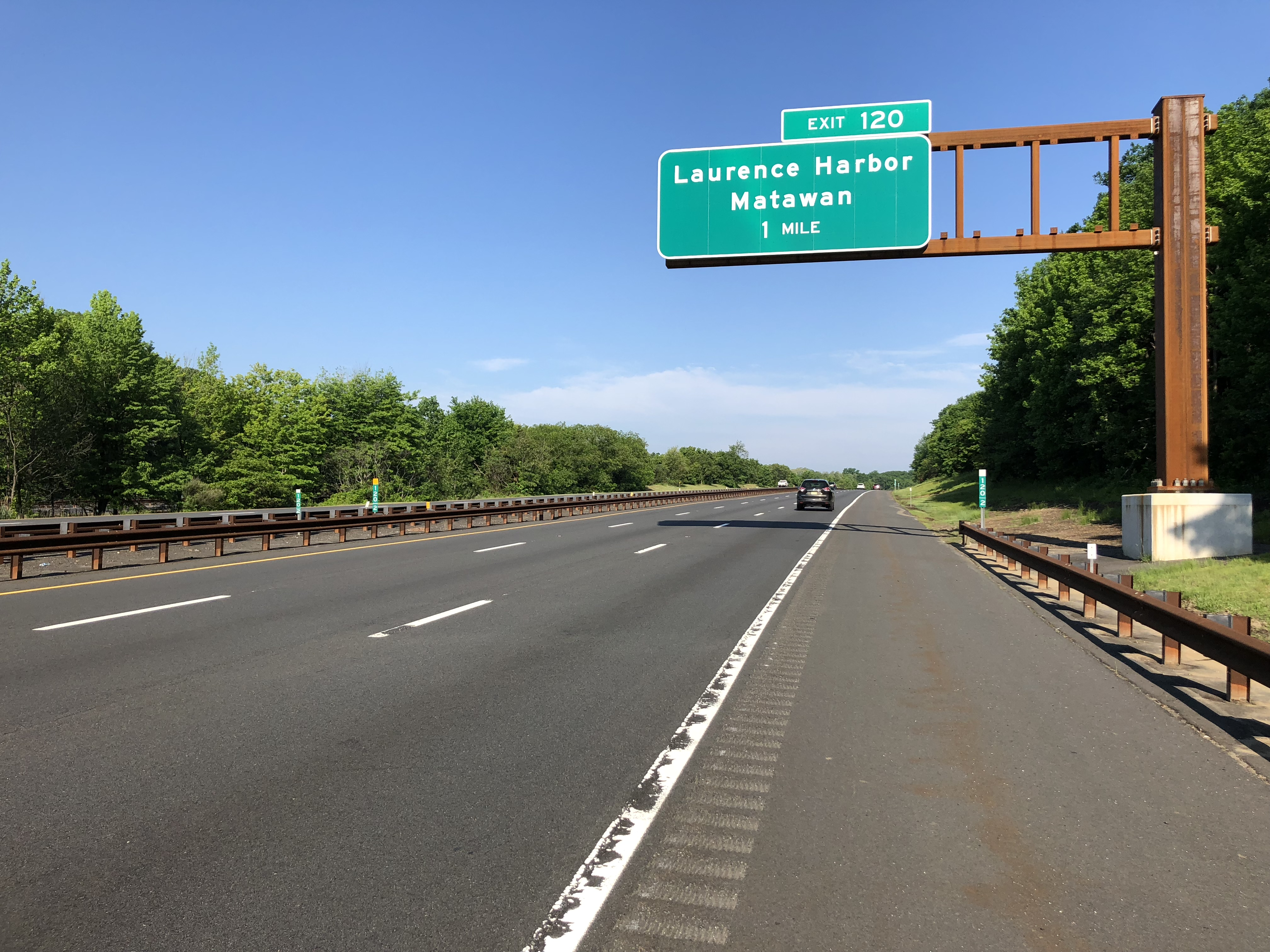
The northbound Garden State Parkway approaching the exit for Matawan

As of May 2010, the borough had a total of 31.45 miles (50.61 km) of roadways, of which 24.37 miles (39.22 km) were maintained by the municipality, 4.50 miles (7.24 km) by Monmouth County and 2.50 miles (4.02 km) by the New Jersey Department of Transportation.

Matawan is traversed by Route 34, Route 79 and County Route 516. The Garden State Parkway skirts the northern end of the borough (with the southbound lanes only passing through briefly); the nearest exits are exits 118 and 120.

=== Public transportation ===
In the late 20th century, Matawan became known for its heavily used train station at Aberdeen-Matawan. Commuter rail service is available on NJ Transit's North Jersey Coast Line, which attracts riders from all over western Monmouth County and provides service to New York City's Penn Station, either directly or via Secaucus Junction. Aberdeen-Matawan station is the busiest station in Monmouth County, having roughly 2,500 daily boardings.

NJ Transit also provides bus service to the Port Authority Bus Terminal in Midtown Manhattan via two routes, the 133, which also stops in Old Bridge and Aberdeen, and the 135, which also stops in Freehold, Marlboro, and Aberdeen.

== Notable people ==
People who were born in, residents of, or otherwise closely associated with Matawan include:

- Monica Aksamit (born 1990), saber fencer who won a bronze medal at the 2016 Summer Olympics in the Women's Saber Team event
- Joseph D. Bedle (1821–1894), 23rd Governor of New Jersey, in office from 1875 to 1878
- Ryan Buggle (born 2010), actor and dancer who has appeared on Law & Order: Special Victims Unit
- Gerard Canonico (born 1989), stage actor
- Connor Clifton (born 1995), ice hockey defenseman for the Boston Bruins of the NHL
- Robert D. Clifton (born 1968), member of the New Jersey General Assembly who was Mayor of Matawan from 1996 to 2005
- Terry Deitz (born 1959), third-place finisher on Survivor: Panama
- Edward P. Felt (1959–2001), passenger aboard United Airlines Flight 93 who is believed to have made one of the last calls to 9-1-1 immediately prior to the fatal crash of the jetliner
- Philip Freneau (1752–1832), poet during the American Revolutionary War
- Elmer H. Geran (1875–1964), represented New Jersey's 3rd congressional district from 1925 to 1927
- Delores Holmes (born 1946), soul singer
- Erison Hurtault (born 1984), 400m Olympian track runner
- Jim Jeffcoat (born 1961), professional football player for the Dallas Cowboys and the Buffalo Bills from 1983 to 1997
- Howard Kremer (born 1971), comedian and comedic rapper
- Bob McKenty, poet
- Inger Lorre (1963–2024), musician, singer and songwriter best known as the frontwoman of the Nymphs
- Victor J. Pospishil (1915–2006), Ukrainian Catholic priest and a leading scholar on canon law and the Eastern Catholic churches
- Richard Reines, recording industry executive who is co-owner of Drive-Thru Records, a record label specializing largely in pop punk music
- Anthony Sesely (born 1983), professional stock car racing driver who competes in the NASCAR Whelen Modified Tour
- William H. Sutphin (1887–1972), represented New Jersey's 3rd congressional district from 1931 to 1943, and was mayor of Matawan from 1915 to 1916 and 1921 to 1926
- Thom Wasluck, musician and singer-songwriter who known for his music project Planning for Burial
- Jacqueline Walker (born 1941), politician who served in the New Jersey General Assembly from 1984 to 1986
- Greg Wyshynski (born 1977), sportswriter
- Jimmy Yacabonis (born 1992), professional baseball pitcher who played in Major League Baseball for the Baltimore Orioles, Seattle Mariners, Miami Marlins, Tampa Bay Rays, and New York Mets
