= Navesink Highlands =

Upland area in New Jersey, United States

Coordinates: 40.39964°N 74.03652°W

- Atlantic Highlands
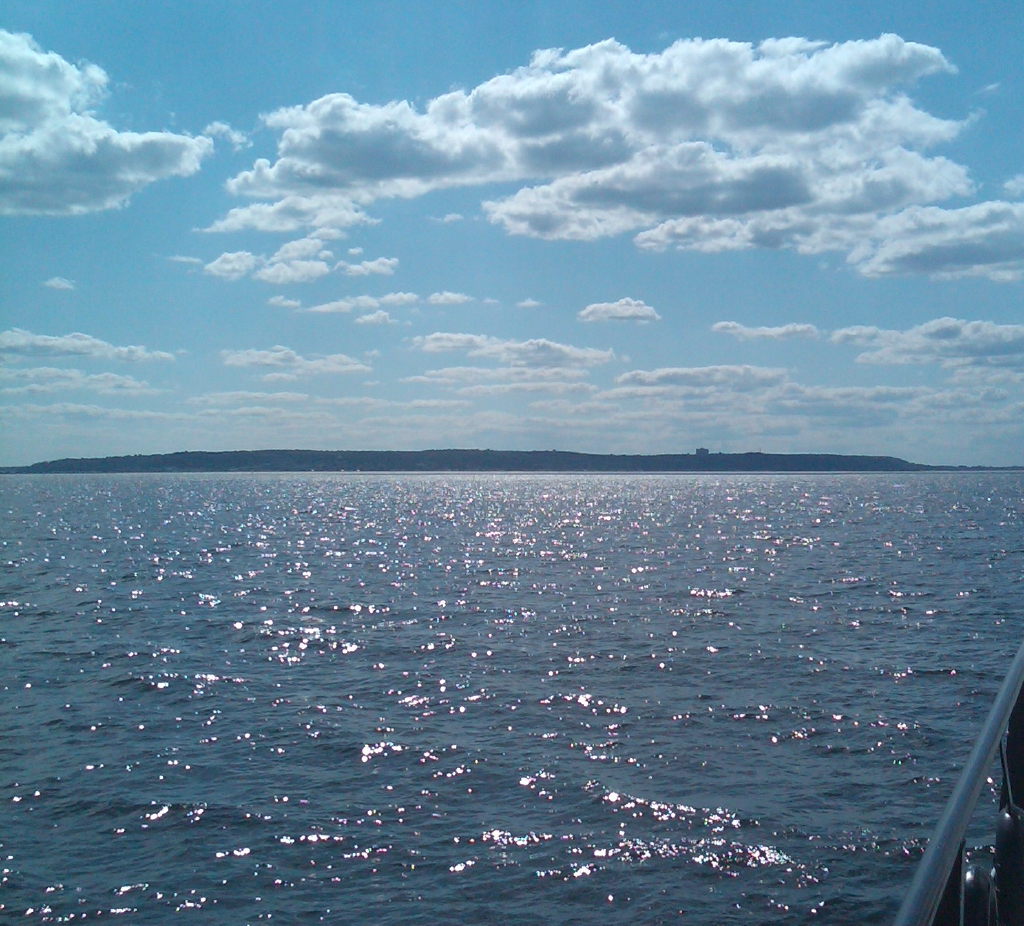
- Navesink Highlands seen from the Atlantic Ocean while on approach to New York Harbor

Highest point
- Peak: Crawford Hill
- Elevation: 391 ft (119 m)

Dimensions
- Length: 18 mi (29 km) east–west

Geography
- Country: United States
- State: New Jersey

Geology
- Rock age: Cretaceous/Tertiary
- Rock type: sedimentary

The Navesink Highlands, sometimes referred to as the Highlands of Navesink and also known as the Atlantic Highlands, is a range of low hills and upland areas located along the United States Atlantic coast in New Jersey. The hills of the Highlands reach over 350 feet (107 m) in elevation, reportedly reaching a maximum elevation of 391 feet (119 meters) at Crawford Hill, which is the highest point in Monmouth County. The seaward front of the Navesink Highlands constitute the highest headlands along the United States east coast south of Maine, with the highest point of the headlands reaching an elevation of 266 feet (81 meters) at Mount Mitchill.

== Geography ==
The Navesink Highlands, which stretch west to east along the south shore of Raritan Bay (part of New York Bay), lie entirely within the boundaries of Monmouth County. A thin barrier spit known as Sandy Hook fronts the ocean side of the Navesink Highlands, separated from the base of the most seaward hills by the narrow tidal channel of the Shrewsbury River.

The western portions of the Highlands, which attain the highest elevations of the range, are sometimes referred to as the Mount Pleasant Hills. The hills of this area include Beacon Hill, Telegraph Hill, and Crawford Hill. Beacon Hill is often referred to as the tallest "peak" in the range, however it only obtains an elevation of 373 feet. (USGS topographic map Marlboro, NJ shows a benchmark at the approximate summit of Beacon Hill with an elevation of 364 feet.) The actual tallest summit is Crawford Hill, followed by Telegraph Hill. This is evident by Bell Labs (now AT&T) building their famous Holmdel Horn Antenna on the summit of Crawford Hill, while the Army picked Telegraph Hill for a main Nike missile control center, and missile silo. The Mount Pleasant area, generally comprising portions of Holmdel and Marlboro with elevations over 300 feet, induces a slight micro climate. In the winter, it is possible for the Mount Pleasant region to receive more snow than lower elevation areas. This is due to lapse rate which shows that temperature drops on average 3.5 - 5 degrees for every 1000 feet of elevation. Due to the influence of the ocean in the winter, the hills often receive snow at 31 degrees while lower elevations receive mixed precipitation or rain.

== Geology ==
The hills of the Navesink Highlands are composed of uplifted layers of hardened sands, mud, and gravel from the Atlantic Coastal Plain. The uplift of the Highlands is attributed to glacial rebound, although it is possible that other geologic processes are occurring. The current height of the hills is partly a consequence of their structure. The topmost geologic layer of the Highlands, the Cohansey Formation, is composed of sand, gravel, and erosion resistant ironstone. This layer forms a hard capstone along the highest summits of the Highlands, protecting more easily weathered underlying geologic layers such as the Navesink Formation.

== Recreation ==
The Navesink Highlands offer a variety of recreational and educational opportunities to the region. These include hiking, fishing, historical venues, and even fossil collecting. Holmdel Park contains several hills in the Mt. Pleasant portion of the range, and is nationally known for its difficult cross country courses.

Parks, preserves, and historical sites from east to west:

- Navesink Twin Lights Museum
- Hartshorne Woods Park
- Mount Mitchill Scenic Overlook County Park
- Huber Woods Park
- Poricy Park
- Deep Cut Gardens
- Tatum Park
- Holmdel Park

== See also ==
- The Hominy Hills, a similar but less prominent coastal upland stretching west to east between Freehold and Asbury Park
