= Hominy Hills =

Coordinates: 40.3001°N 74.163°W

Highest point
- Peak: Throckmorton Hill
- Elevation: 307 ft (94 m)

Dimensions
- Length: 4 mi (6.4 km) east–west

Geography
- Country: United States
- State: New Jersey

Geology
- Rock age: Tertiary
- Rock type: Sedimentary

The Hominy Hills are a range of low, gravel-capped hills and upland areas located along the boundary of Colts Neck, Howell and Wall Townships, in Monmouth County, New Jersey, and extending east into the Borough of Tinton Falls (formerly part of Shrewsbury Township), and extending west to the eastern sections of Freehold and Marlboro Townships. The hills attain heights of over 300 feet (91 meters) in elevation, attaining a maximum elevation of 307 feet (94 meters) at Throckmorton Hill, which is the highest point in Howell Township.

== Geography ==
The Hominy Hills extend from west to east, between Freehold Borough and Asbury Park, for a distance of approximately four miles. The greater portion of the range lies within Naval Weapons Station Earle. It forms the divide between the Swimming River to the north, and the Manasquan and Shark Rivers to the south.

Following is a list describing the notable summits of the Hominy Hills from west to east; all are entirely within Naval Weapons Station Earle.

- Throckmorton Hill, or Hominy Hill proper, 307 feet (94 meters) high, is located to the west of Guadalcanal Road. Lunga Road climbs this hill, curving around the summit but not attaining it. A fire lookout tower formerly stood on the summit, a water tower stands near the site of the fire tower.
- Cranberry Hill, 244 feet (74 meters), is located southeast of the intersection of Esperance and Macassar roads, it is crossed by a fire road.
- Huckleberry Hill or Lippincott Hill, also 244 feet (74 meters), is located south of Esperance Road and north of Munda Road. The headwaters of the Shark River are to the south of this hill.

== Geology ==
A cuesta, the Hominy Hills are composed of layers of unconsolidated sand, mud, and gravel from the Atlantic Coastal Plain. The topmost geologic layer, the Cohansey Formation, is composed of sand, gravel, and erosion resistant ironstone. This layer forms a hard capstone along the highest summits, protecting more easily weathered underlying geologic layers such as the Kirkwood Formation. The scarp of the cuesta faces north while the gentler dip slope faces south.

== Flora and fauna ==
The Hominy Hills fall within the Pinelands region, and exhibit both pine dominated and oak dominated forests, as well as intermediate forests. Pitch pine (Pinus rigida) is the most abundant tree. A variety of oaks are also present, including black (Quercus velutina), white (Quercus alba), post (Quercus stellata), chestnut (Quercus prinus), scarlet (Quercus coccinea), and blackjack (Quercus marilandica). These forests tend to be open with widely spaced trees and plenty of sunlight reaching the forest floor.

The understory is thick with shrubs, including black huckleberry (Gaylussacia baccata) and early lowbush blueberry (Vaccinium pallidum). Mountain laurel (Kalmia latifolia), and sheep laurel (Kalmia angustifolia) are also present. Bracken fern (Pteridium aquilinum) is abundant.

The Hominy Hills pine land extends from near Centreville and Green Grove westward about 6 miles, and its greatest breadth from north to south is a little more than 3 miles. It includes the southern part of Shrewsbury and Atlantic Townships, and about 2 square miles of Howell Township. The surface is quite hilly, the highest of the Hominy Hills rising to 308 feet above tide, and the whole tract is very poor, the soil being white sand on the lowlands and white sandy gravel and coarse white sand on the hills. A great deal of the lowland is also too wet for cultivation, even if otherwise fit. With a few exceptions this tract is all in forest, the timber nearly all pine, small and stunted - looking.

Animals such as whitetailed deer, gray squirrels, red squirrels, chipmunks, red fox as well as a large variety of birds inhabit the hills. Turkey Vultures and Red Tail Hawks are also common.

== Recreation ==
As much of the Hominy Hills are within Naval Weapons Station Earle no public recreation areas exist. Hominy Hill Golf Course, operated by the Monmouth County Park System, is actually located in the lowland to the north of the Hominy Hills.

== See also ==
- The Navesink Highlands, a similar but more prominent coastal upland stretching west to east along the south shore of Raritan Bay
