= Port Monmouth, New Jersey =

Populated place in Monmouth County, New Jersey, US

- Census-designated place
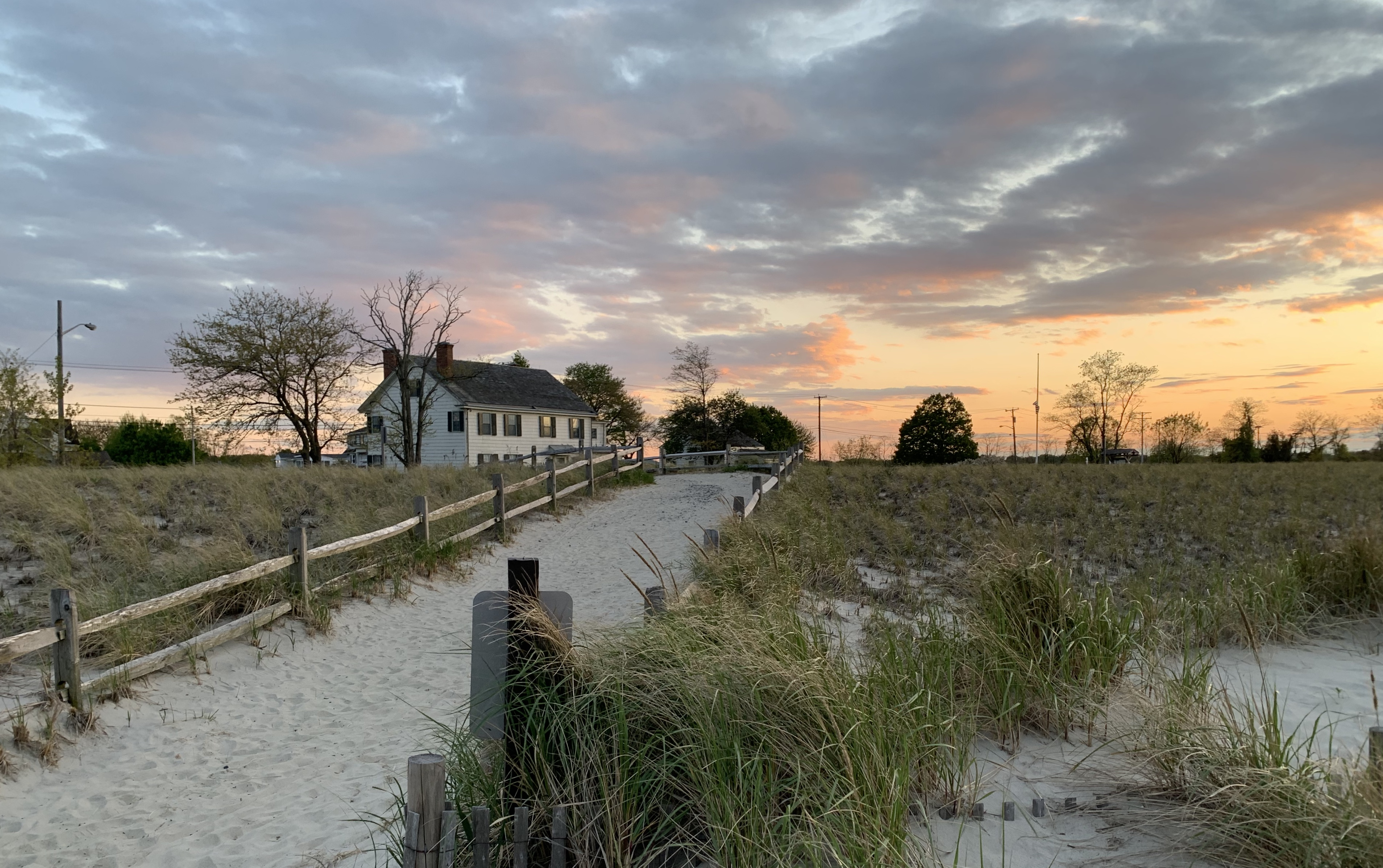
- Seabrook–Wilson House and dune in Port Monmouth

- Location of Port Monmouth in Monmouth County highlighted in red (left). Inset map: Location of Monmouth County in New Jersey highlighted in orange (right).

- Location in Monmouth County Location in New Jersey Location in the United States
- Coordinates: 40.436673°N 74.098641°W
- Country: United States
- State: New Jersey
- County: Monmouth
- Township: Middletown

Area
  - Total: 1.34 sq mi (3.48 km^{2})
  - Land: 1.30 sq mi (3.37 km^{2})
  - Water: 0.042 sq mi (0.11 km^{2}) 3.04%
- Elevation: 9.8 ft (3 m)

Population (2020)
  - Total: 3,745
  - Density: 2,878.7/sq mi (1,111.46/km^{2})
- Time zone: UTC−05:00 (Eastern (EST))
  - Summer (DST): UTC−04:00 (Eastern (EDT))
- ZIP Code: 07758
- Area codes: 732/848
- FIPS code: 34-60360
- GNIS feature ID: 02389696

Port Monmouth is an unincorporated community and census-designated place (CDP) in Middletown Township, situated on the Raritan Bayshore of northern Monmouth County, New Jersey, United States. At the 2020 United States census, the CDP's population was 3,745, a decrease of 73 (−1.9%) from the 2010 census count of 3,818. Port Monmouth has a Mayor.

== Geography ==
Port Monmouth is in northern Monmouth County, in the northwestern part of Middletown Township. It is bordered to the east by Belford and to the west by North Middletown. Its northern boundary is the shore of Sandy Hook Bay, part of the larger Raritan Bay. New Jersey Route 36 forms the southern border of the community. Route 36 leads east 4 miles (6 km) to Atlantic Highlands and west 5 miles (8 km) to Keyport.

According to the U.S. Census Bureau, Port Monmouth has an area of 1.34 square miles (3.47 km^{2}), including 1.30 square miles (3.37 km^{2}) of land and 0.04 square miles (0.10 km^{2}) of water (3.06%). Tidal Compton Creek flows northward to Sandy Hook Bay through the east side of the community, while Pews Creek parallels it on the west side.

== Demographics ==
Historical population
Census	Pop.	Note	%±
1880	396		—
1890	754		90.4%
1950	1,767		—
1990	3,558		—
2000	3,742		5.2%
2010	3,818		2.0%
2020	3,745		−1.9%
Population sources: 1880-1890 1900-2010; 1950 1960 1970; 1980 1990 2000; 2010 2020

Port Monmouth appeared as an unincorporated community in the 1950 U.S. census. It did not appear in subsequent censuses until it was listed as a census designated place in the 1990 U.S. census.

=== Racial and ethnic composition ===
Port Monmouth CDP, New Jersey – Racial and ethnic composition Note: the US Census treats Hispanic/Latino as an ethnic category. This table excludes Latinos from the racial categories and assigns them to a separate category. Hispanics/Latinos may be of any race.
Race / Ethnicity (NH = Non-Hispanic)	Pop 2000	Pop 2010	Pop 2020	% 2000	% 2010	% 2020
White alone (NH)	3,392	3,334	2,987	90.65%	87.32%	79.76%
Black or African American alone (NH)	47	74	91	1.26%	1.94%	2.43%
Native American or Alaska Native alone (NH)	3	6	7	0.08%	0.16%	0.19%
Asian alone (NH)	15	75	98	0.40%	1.96%	2.62%
Native Hawaiian or Pacific Islander alone (NH)	0	0	2	0.00%	0.00%	0.05%
Other race alone (NH)	0	1	13	0.00%	0.03%	0.35%
Mixed race or Multiracial (NH)	25	26	132	0.67%	0.68%	3.52%
Hispanic or Latino (any race)	260	302	415	6.95%	7.91%	11.08%
Total	3,742	3,818	3,745	100.00%	100.00%	100.00%

=== 2020 census ===
As of the 2020 census, Port Monmouth had a population of 3,745. The median age was 40.0 years. 22.2% of residents were under the age of 18 and 14.8% were 65 years of age or older. For every 100 females, there were 87.8 males, and for every 100 females age 18 and over, there were 87.3 males age 18 and over.

100.0% of residents lived in urban areas, while 0.0% lived in rural areas.

There were 1,396 households in Port Monmouth, of which 31.1% had children under the age of 18 living in them. Of all households, 50.6% were married-couple households, 15.6% were households with a male householder and no spouse or partner present, and 25.6% were households with a female householder and no spouse or partner present. About 24.4% of all households were made up of individuals and 14.5% had someone living alone who was 65 years of age or older.

There were 1,486 housing units, of which 6.1% were vacant. The homeowner vacancy rate was 1.5% and the rental vacancy rate was 6.5%.

=== 2010 census ===
The 2010 United States census counted 3,818 people, 1,368 households, and 997 families in the CDP. The population density was 2,933.4 per square mile (1,132.6/km^{2}). There were 1,441 housing units at an average density of 1,107.1 per square mile (427.5/km^{2}). The racial makeup was 92.95% (3,549) White, 2.15% (82) Black or African American, 0.21% (8) Native American, 1.99% (76) Asian, 0.00% (0) Pacific Islander, 1.49% (57) from other races, and 1.20% (46) from two or more races. Hispanic or Latino of any race were 7.91% (302) of the population.

Of the 1,368 households, 34.6% had children under the age of 18; 56.0% were married couples living together; 11.8% had a female householder with no husband present and 27.1% were non-families. Of all households, 22.4% were made up of individuals and 9.9% had someone living alone who was 65 years of age or older. The average household size was 2.78 and the average family size was 3.29.

24.1% of the population were under the age of 18, 8.0% from 18 to 24, 27.3% from 25 to 44, 30.4% from 45 to 64, and 10.3% who were 65 years of age or older. The median age was 39.7 years. For every 100 females, the population had 95.1 males. For every 100 females ages 18 and older there were 91.7 males.

=== 2000 census ===
At the 2000 census there were 3,742 people, 1,289 households, and 964 families living in the CDP. The population density was 2,833.1 inhabitants per square mile (1,093.9/km^{2}). There were 1,358 housing units at an average density of 1,028.2 per square mile (397.0/km^{2}). The racial makeup of the CDP was 95.70% White, 1.28% African American, 0.19% Native American, 0.43% Asian, 1.15% from other races, and 1.26% from two or more races. Hispanic or Latino of any race were 6.95% of the population.

Of the 1,289 households 38.9% had children under the age of 18 living with them, 57.7% were married couples living together, 12.3% had a female householder with no husband present, and 25.2% were non-families. 21.1% of households were one person and 11.0% were one person aged 65 or older. The average household size was 2.89 and the average family size was 3.39. 99% of the population in Port Monmouth.

The age distribution was 27.4% under the age of 18, 8.5% from 18 to 24, 32.3% from 25 to 44, 21.4% from 45 to 64, and 10.5% 65 or older. The median age was 35 years. For every 100 females, there were 94.1 males. For every 100 females age 18 and over, there were 91.1 males.

The median household income was $53,864 and the median family income was $63,375. Males had a median income of $45,565 versus $30,244 for females. The per capita income for the CDP was $21,369. About 8.6% of families and 10.5% of the population were below the poverty line, including 15.3% of those under age 18 and 12.3% of those age 65 or over.

== Transportation ==
NJ Transit offers bus service to Newark on the 61 route and local bus service on the 817 route.

== Emergency services ==
Port Monmouth is served by the Port Monmouth Fire Company #1 and Port Monmouth First Aid Squad which are both located in the CDP.

== In media ==
The community was mentioned in a 1990 episode of Saturday Night Live during a Weekend Update sketch featuring Al Franken covering a cocaine deal in Port Monmouth. The tugboats Ocean Prince and Newport can be seen in the footage suggesting it was actually filmed locally in New York City for the show, as Port Monmouth and neighboring Belford Harbor are home to fishing vessels - which is noted by Franken during the sketch. At the time of filming those tugboats were under the Amerada Hess Corporation, which had a storage facility and pier in Red Hook, Brooklyn.

== Notable people ==
People who were born in, are residents of, or otherwise closely associated with Port Monmouth include:

- Mike Largey (born 1960), professional basketball player who played power forward for Hapoel Tel Aviv B.C. of the Israeli Basketball Premier League from 1984 to 1987
