= Seabrook–Wilson House =

Historic house in New Jersey, United States

- U.S. National Register of Historic Places
- New Jersey Register of Historic Places
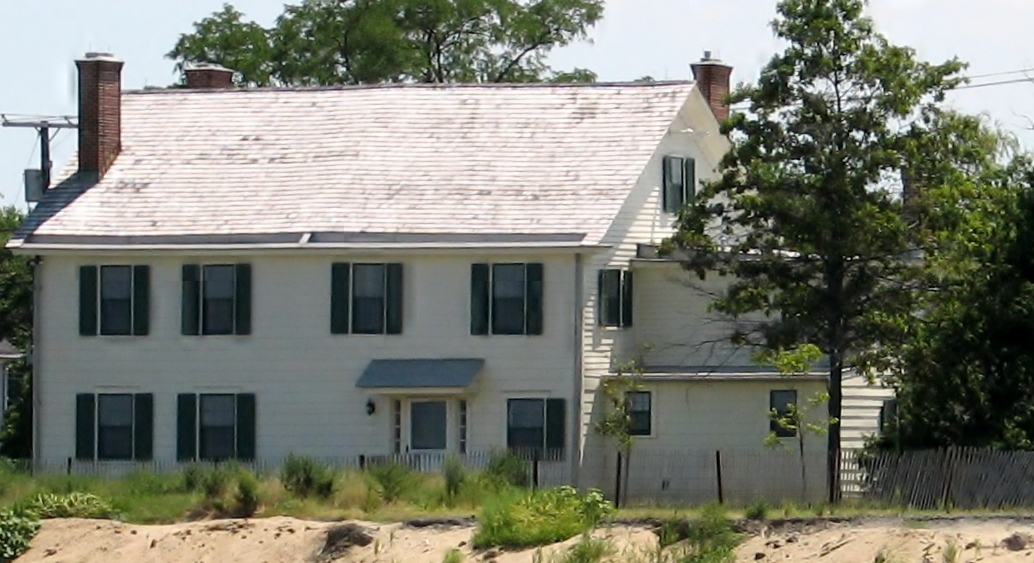

- Location within Monmouth County, New Jersey Location within New Jersey Location within the United States
- Location: 119 Port Monmouth Road, Port Monmouth, New Jersey
- Coordinates: 40.4392°N 74.0931°W
- Built: 1750
- NRHP reference No.: 74001178
- NJRHP No.: 2030

Significant dates
- Added to NRHP: October 29, 1974
- Designated NJRHP: July 1, 1974

The Seabrook–Wilson House (also known as the Whitlock–Seabrook–Wilson Home and nicknamed the Spy House) is located at 119 Port Monmouth Road in the Port Monmouth section of Middletown Township in Monmouth County, New Jersey, United States. The house was added to the National Register of Historic Places on October 29, 1974, for its significance in social history and transportation.

== History ==
The original house was built in 1663 by Thomas Whitlock, who came to North America in 1641, first living in Brooklyn. It no longer exists. It started out as a 1 1/2-story, one-room cabin, and Whitlock lived here with his family. The house was turned into a two-story home by its second owner Thomas Seabrook, who was a patriot in the New Jersey militia. Over the years the Seabrook family added to the original structure. The home stayed in the Seabrook family for a total of 250 years.

Listed on the New Jersey and National Registers of Historic Places, the Seabrook–Wilson House is one of the oldest surviving houses in the Bayshore. The Seabrook‐Wilson House began as a small cabin about 1720 and over the years was expanded and altered many times by later generations. By 1896 (photo left) the house had grown to its present size and appearance.

For most of its history, the farm on Sandy Hook Bay was home to generations of two prominent Port Monmouth families, the Seabrooks and the Wilsons. Ship owners and captains, an American Revolutionary War militia officer, local business owners and investors, and a clergyman were part of these notable families, many of whom served in local government positions. Until the mid-1800s, the Seabrook‐Wilson House stood alone on this stretch of the Bayshore, surrounded by a farm of several hundred acres and salt marsh. With the development of steamboat service and the railroads in the mid‐1800s, the village of Port Monmouth grew up around the steamboat pier and commercial fishing, transforming the area into a bustling port. Tourists flocked to the area for its fresh air, sandy beaches and recreational fishing. By the early 1900s the old Seabrook‐Wilson farmhouse had become an inn for tourists, known first as "Bay Side Manor" and later as "The White House."

After almost fifty years as a boarding house and tavern, the Seabrook‐Wilson House stood empty and in severe disrepair by the mid-1960s. Concerned Middletown residents convinced Township officials to purchase the site in 1967 and save the Bayshore landmark from destruction. The Middletown Township Historical Society and, later, the Spy House Museum Corporation, operated the house as a local history museum for over twenty years.

In 1998, Middletown Township transferred the property to the County of Monmouth and it became part of the surrounding Bayshore Waterfront Park, which preserves a thriving coastal landscape of salt marsh, dunes, mile of beach and scenic views across the water. Visitors can once again enjoy the historic site and create new memories of Port Monmouth and the Sandy Hook Bay.

The house is open to the public from April through October from 1 - 4 p.m. on Sundays only.

=== Spy House ===
In attempting to create interest in the building, in the 1960s part-time caretaker Gertrude Neidlinger fabricated a story that the house was a tavern during the Revolutionary War where British troops were spied on by patriots. There is no evidence that the house was ever a tavern at that time. It was a private home. It remained a private home until the early twentieth century. However, the tale caught on and helped keep local interest in the house, probably aiding in preserving the property.

The Spy House Museum, which conducted candlelight ghost tours, was creatively alleged to be "haunted" by its part-time curator, Gertrude Neidlinger.

== See also ==
- National Register of Historic Places listings in Monmouth County, New Jersey
- List of the oldest buildings in New Jersey
