= North Middletown, New Jersey =

Populated place in Monmouth County, New Jersey, US

- Census-designated place
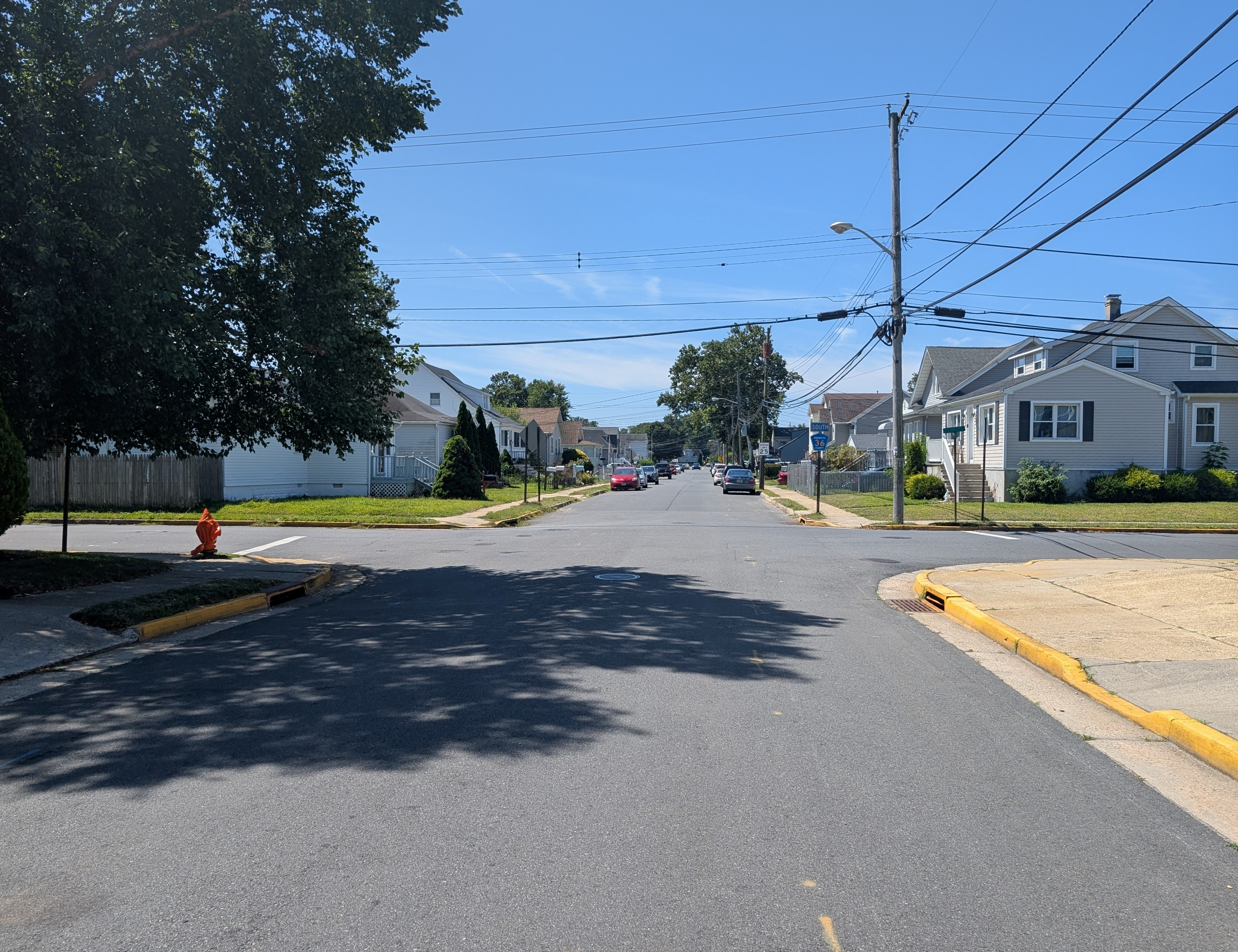
- CR 36 southbound through North Middletown

- Location of North Middletown in Monmouth County circled and highlighted in red (left). Inset map: Location of Monmouth County in New Jersey highlighted in orange (right).

- Location in Monmouth County Location in New Jersey Location in the United States
- Coordinates: 40.438991°N 74.118523°W
- Country: United States
- State: New Jersey
- County: Monmouth
- Township: Middletown

Area
  - Total: 0.43 sq mi (1.12 km^{2})
  - Land: 0.43 sq mi (1.12 km^{2})
  - Water: 0 sq mi (0.00 km^{2}) 0.00%
- Elevation: 9.8 ft (3 m)

Population (2020)
  - Total: 3,146
  - Density: 7,254.6/sq mi (2,801.02/km^{2})
- Time zone: UTC−05:00 (Eastern (EST))
  - Summer (DST): UTC−04:00 (Eastern (EDT))
- ZIP Code: 07748
- Area codes: 732/848
- FIPS code: 34-53205
- GNIS feature ID: 02389577

North Middletown is an unincorporated community and census-designated place (CDP) within Middletown Township, in Monmouth County, in the U.S. state of New Jersey. As of the 2020 census, the CDP population was 3,146, down from 3,295 in 2010.

The community was formerly known as East Keansburg and was renamed North Middletown by municipal resolution in August 1987 as part of an effort to create a greater sense of connection to the township rather than to Keansburg, its neighbor to the west. With the renaming of the neighborhood, East Keansburg Elementary School was renamed Ocean Avenue School later in 1987.

== Geography ==
North Middletown is in northeastern Monmouth County, in the northwest corner of Middletown Township. It is bordered to the east by Port Monmouth and to the west by the borough of Keansburg. The northern edge of the community is the shore of Sandy Hook Bay, an arm of Raritan Bay. New Jersey Route 36 runs along the southern border of the community, leading east 5 miles (8 km) to Atlantic Highlands and west the same distance to Keyport.

According to the U.S. Census Bureau, North Middletown has a total area of 0.434 square miles (1.124 km^{2}), all land.

== Demographics ==
Historical population
Census	Pop.	Note	%±
1990	3,160		—
2000	3,165		0.2%
2010	3,295		4.1%
2020	3,146		−4.5%
source: 1950 1960 1970; 1980 1990 2000; 2010 2020

North Middletown first appeared as a census designated place in the 1990 U.S. census.

=== Racial and ethnic composition ===
North Middletown CDP, New Jersey – Racial and ethnic composition Note: the US Census treats Hispanic/Latino as an ethnic category. This table excludes Latinos from the racial categories and assigns them to a separate category. Hispanics/Latinos may be of any race.
Race / Ethnicity (NH = Non-Hispanic)	Pop 2000	Pop 2010	Pop 2020	% 2000	% 2010	% 2020
White alone (NH)	2,884	2,779	2,499	91.12%	84.34%	79.43%
Black or African American alone (NH)	46	55	84	1.45%	1.67%	2.67%
Native American or Alaska Native alone (NH)	0	5	2	0.00%	0.15%	0.06%
Asian alone (NH)	45	83	68	1.42%	2.52%	2.16%
Native Hawaiian or Pacific Islander alone (NH)	1	1	0	0.03%	0.03%	0.00%
Other race alone (NH)	4	3	17	0.13%	0.09%	0.54%
Mixed race or Multiracial (NH)	15	52	130	0.47%	1.58%	4.13%
Hispanic or Latino (any race)	170	317	346	5.37%	9.62%	11.00%
Total	3,165	3,295	3,146	100.00%	100.00%	100.00%

=== 2020 census ===
As of the 2020 census, North Middletown had a population of 3,146. The median age was 39.4 years. 21.0% of residents were under the age of 18 and 11.8% of residents were 65 years of age or older. For every 100 females, there were 97.6 males, and for every 100 females age 18 and older there were 96.7 males.

100.0% of residents lived in urban areas, while 0.0% lived in rural areas.

There were 1,169 households, of which 32.6% had children under the age of 18 living in them. Of all households, 48.1% were married-couple households, 16.9% were households with a male householder and no spouse or partner present, and 26.0% were households with a female householder and no spouse or partner present. About 20.3% of all households were made up of individuals, and 5.4% had someone living alone who was 65 years of age or older.

There were 1,244 housing units, of which 6.0% were vacant. The homeowner vacancy rate was 2.5% and the rental vacancy rate was 6.4%.

=== 2010 census ===
The 2010 United States census counted 3,295 people, 1,142 households, and 859 families in the CDP. The population density was 7,593.9 per square mile (2,932.0/km^{2}). There were 1,203 housing units at an average density of 2,772.5 per square mile (1,070.5/km^{2}). The racial makeup was 90.77% (2,991) White, 1.82% (60) Black or African American, 0.21% (7) Native American, 2.61% (86) Asian, 0.03% (1) Pacific Islander, 2.03% (67) from other races, and 2.52% (83) from two or more races. Hispanic or Latino of any race were 9.62% (317) of the population.

Of the 1,142 households, 36.2% had children under the age of 18; 54.1% were married couples living together; 15.6% had a female householder with no husband present and 24.8% were non-families. Of all households, 18.0% were made up of individuals and 5.2% had someone living alone who was 65 years of age or older. The average household size was 2.89 and the average family size was 3.30.

23.9% of the population were under the age of 18, 10.0% from 18 to 24, 31.1% from 25 to 44, 27.9% from 45 to 64, and 7.1% who were 65 years of age or older. The median age was 34.8 years. For every 100 females, the population had 95.5 males. For every 100 females ages 18 and older there were 92.4 males.

=== 2000 census ===
At the 2000 United States census there were 3,165 people, 1,026 households and 819 families living in the CDP. The population density was 6,879.6 inhabitants per square mile (2,656.2/km^{2}). There were 1,099 housing units at an average density of 2,388.8 per square mile (922.3/km^{2}). The racial makeup of the CDP was 94.79% White, 1.45% African American, 1.42% Asian, 0.03% Pacific Islander, 1.52% from other races, and 0.79% from two or more races. Hispanic or Latino people of any race were 5.37% of the population. There were 1,026 households, of which 45.8% had children under the age of 18 living with them, 57.8% were married couples living together, 16.4% had a female householder with no husband present, and 20.1% were non-families. 16.3% of all households were made up of individuals, and 6.9% had someone living alone who was 65 years of age or older. The average household size was 3.08 and the average family size was 3.44.

Age distribution was 31.0% under the age of 18, 9.0% from 18 to 24, 33.8% from 25 to 44, 18.7% from 45 to 64, and 7.6% who were 65 years of age or older. The median age was 32 years. For every 100 females, there were 94.6 males. For every 100 females age 18 and over, there were 91.0 males.

The median household income was $54,954, and the median family income was $60,893. Males had a median income of $49,120 versus $28,929 for females. The per capita income for the CDP was $20,462. About 4.6% of families and 6.3% of the population were below the poverty line, including 10.7% of those under age 18 and 12.6% of those age 65 or over.

== Emergency services ==
North Middletown is served by the East Keansburg Fire Company and Middletown First Aid and Rescue Squad, both located in the CDP.
