= Monmouth Tract =

Coordinates: 40.4018°N 74.0366°W

The Monmouth Tract, also known as the Monmouth Patent, Navesink Tract or Navesink Patent was a large triangular tract of land granted as a land patent to settlers of New Jersey during the early American colonial period.

== History ==
Colonel Richard Nicolls, an English military officer, had conquered the territory that is now the states of New Jersey and New York when he forced the Dutch surrender of the New Netherland colony at the onset of the Second Anglo-Dutch War in 1664. Nicolls had instructions to govern the colony, and after establishing English rule, he instituted a legal system centered on English common law, and issued conditions upon which plantations and land grants would be created.

After granting a patent for Elizabethtown (Achter Koll on Newark Bay) in 1664, Nicolls granted patents for a triangular tract of land called the Monmouth Tract also called the Navesink Tract on April 8, 1665. Twelve men, most of whom were Quakers from Long Island, purchased a tract that extended from Sandy Hook to the mouth of the Raritan River, upstream approximately 25 miles (40 km), and then southeast to Barnegat Bay. It was first known as Navesink, likely after a band of the Lenape who inhabited the area, and it was established into the settlements of Freehold, Middletown and Shrewsbury, and later as into Monmouth County.

The 13 patentees of Monmouth were Richard Lippincott, William Golden (Goulding) (Golder), Samuel Spicer, Richard Gibbons, Richard Stout, James Grover, John Bowne, John Tilton, Nathaniel Sylvester, William Reape, Walter Clark, Nichols Davis and Obadiah Holmes.

In 1675, Monmouth was established as one of the first four counties in the proprietary East Jersey colony, along with Bergen, Essex and Middlesex. It is thought that the Monmouth Tract and later Monmouth County received its name from the Rhode Island Monmouth Society or from a suggestion from Colonel Lewis Morris that the county should be named after Monmouthshire in Wales, Great Britain. Other suggestions include that it was named for James Scott, 1st Duke of Monmouth (1649–1685), who had many allies among the East Jersey leadership.
