= Penelope Stout =

Early English settler of New Jersey in 1664

Penelope Stout was, with her husband Richard Stout, among the original settlers of Middletown, colonial New Jersey's second English settlement, in 1664. She is the central figure in a popular legend that she survived a ship stranding and deadly Lenape attack on Sandy Hook.

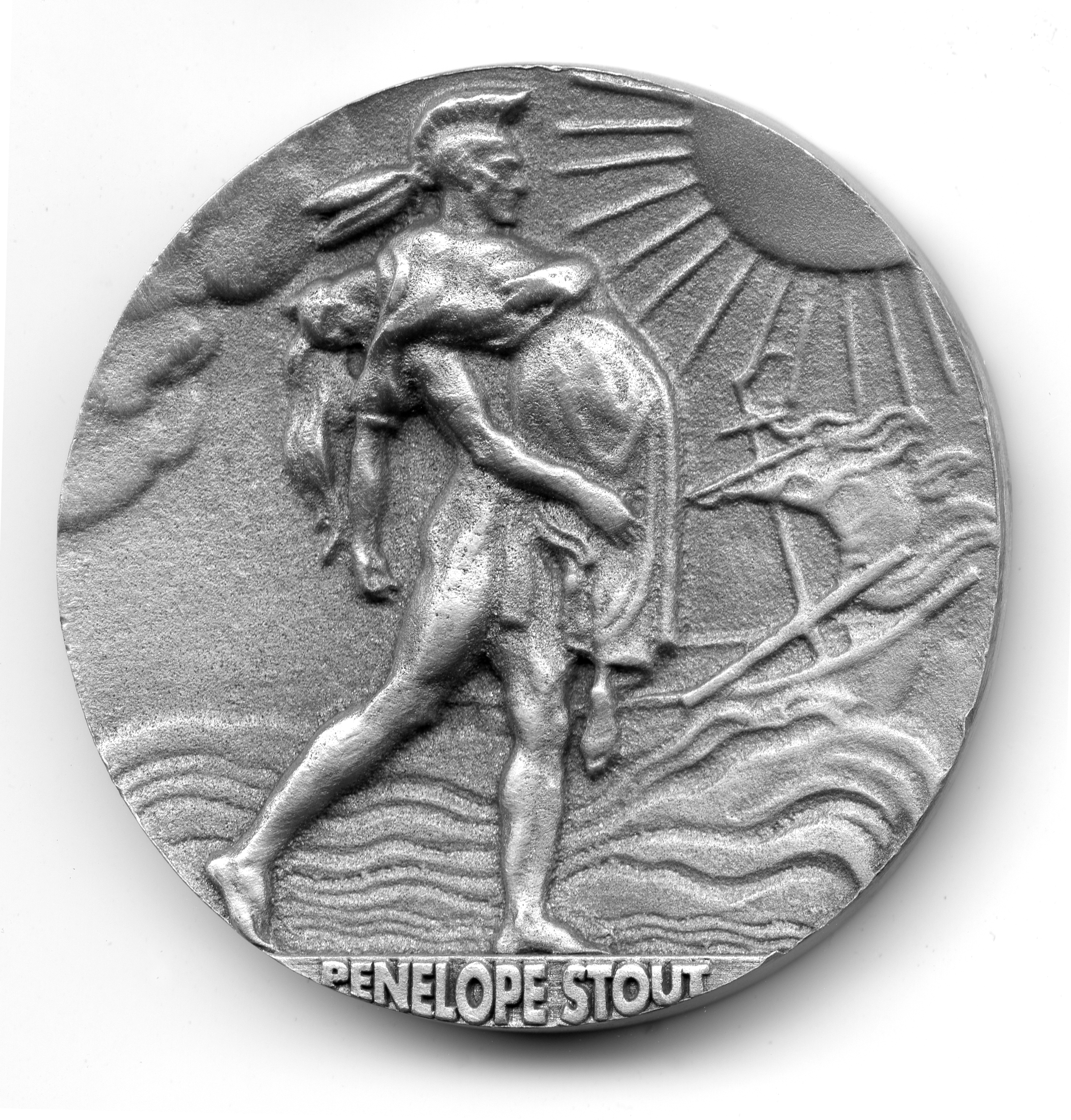
Commemorative medal depicts a scene from the Penelope Stout legend that an Indian rescued her after she survived both a Lenape attack and a ship stranding.

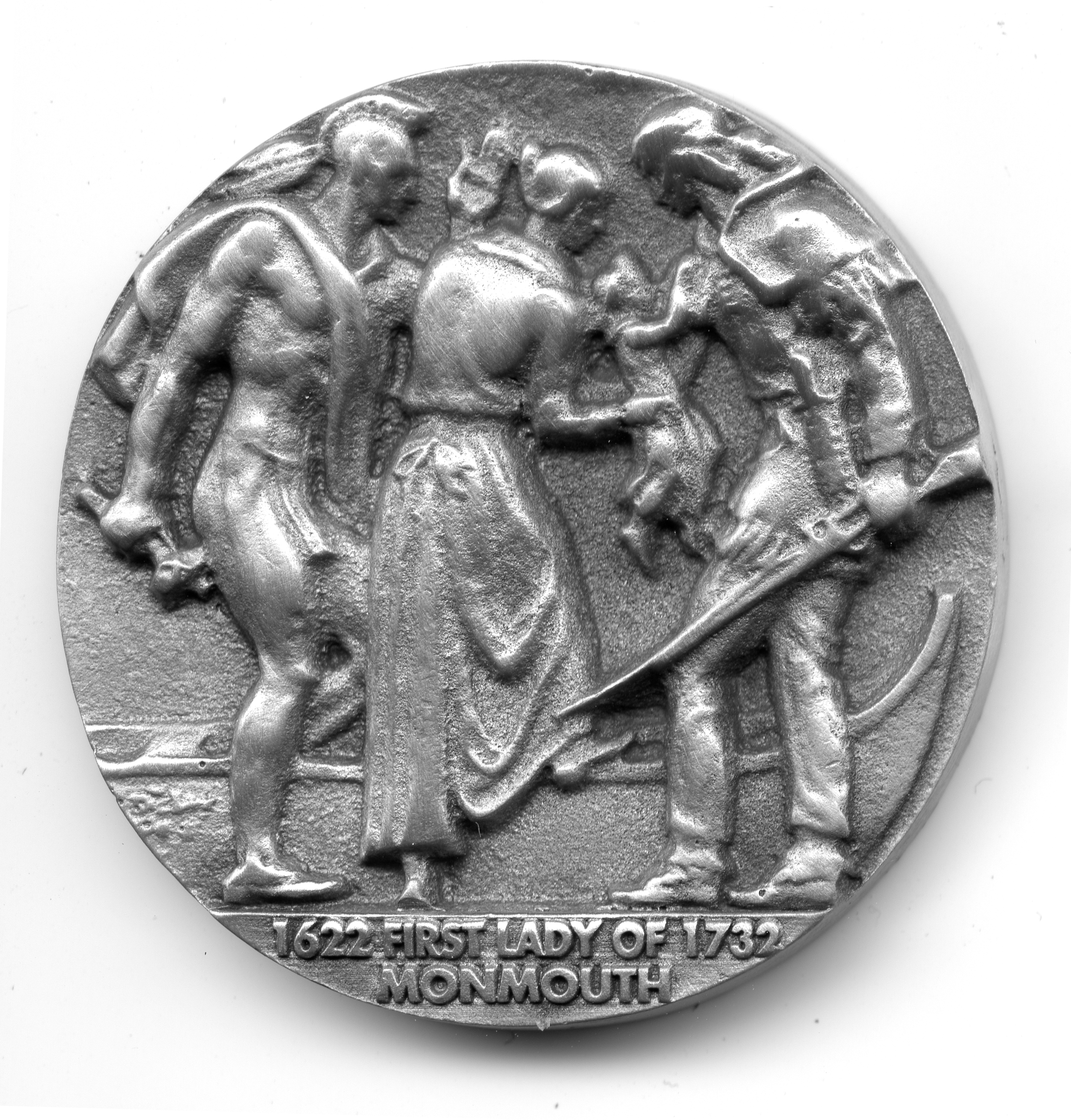
Commemorative medal depicts a scene found in some versions of the Penelope Stout legend in which Stout's rescuer returns to warn her of an imminent attack. The medal gives Stout the honorific title, "First Lady of Monmouth."

== Legend and history ==
Few contemporaneous sources document the life of Penelope Prince Stout. The earliest is from Gravesend on what was then Dutch Long Island. On 12 September 1648, Penelope Prince gave testimony after she accused one neighbor of milking another's cow: "Penelope Prince being questioned, acknowledged her fault in soe speaking, and being sorry for her words, she spoke satisfaction on both sides."

Additional documents are land deeds dating to the Stouts' years in Middletown, New Jersey. One such record notes that "Richard and wife Penelope" sold a house lot and 40 acres on 26 February 1679-70. Another document dated 30 August 1690 certifies that Richard Stout, Sr., transferred title of a riverside lot and meadow to son Benjamin "for the Joynture of [his] Loving wife Penelope."

Nearly twenty different accounts of Penelope Stout's early life and arrival in the American colonies have been published since 1765. They share in common the claims that she survived a ship stranding (or shipwreck) and a Lenape attack. There is no known record of her birth, emigration, marriage to anyone other than Stout, or death. Nor is there a record of a ship stranding or wreck that plausibly fits Penelope’s presence in New Amsterdam by 1643-4, when she married Stout.

In the absence of documentary evidence, the first two published accounts of the legend have shaped all later tellings. As historian John Stillwell notes, these two "versions have much in common, but are still so dissimilar that it is evident that their sources of origin were totally different.” Writing decades after Penelope's death, Samuel Smith included the legend in his 1765 History of New Jersey. Morgan Edwards published a second account in 1792, quoting a letter by Rev. Oliver Hart (1723-1795), minister to third- and fourth-generation Stouts in Hopewell, New Jersey. Like Smith, Hart cites no records. His version of the tale appeared in Edwards’ Materials Towards a History of the Baptists in Jersey and was later reproduced with minor variations by David Benedict in 1813 and John Raum in 1871. For this reason, it's sometimes identified as the "Edwards" or "Benedict" account.

In Samuel Smith’s 1765 telling, a ship carrying an unnamed Dutch couple to New Amsterdam became stranded. Smith gives the location as Sandy Hook in what’s now New Jersey. He dates the event to “about the time of the Indian war in New-England.” Thomas Streets notes the “only Indian war which occurred in New England, while the Dutch were in possession of New York, was the Pequod War, which began in 1636, and ended in 1637."

In Smith’s account, the stranded passengers safely reached shore, but “being afraid of the Indians,” they “made haste” to New Amsterdam (now New York City), leaving behind a man who’d been sick “most of the voyage” and his wife. The pair were soon attacked by Indians who “killed the man, and cut and mangled the woman,” leaving her for dead. She crawled into a hollow tree, where she lived for “several days,” eating the ”excrescences that grew from it." Two Indians discovered her there, the older preventing the younger from killing her. The old man “carried her to a place near where Middletown now stands” and “cured” her wounds. “After some time the Dutch at New-Amsterdam hearing of a white woman among the Indians, concluded who it must be, and some of them came to her relief; the old man her preserver, gave her the choice either to go or stay; she chose the first.”

Smith includes an event missing from Hart’s account. According to Smith, after the woman married “one Stout,” the couple lived in Middletown “among other Dutch inhabitants.” The old Indian was a frequent guest and on one occasion warned Mrs. Stout of an imminent attack. At great risk to himself, he hid a canoe so the family could escape. Stout, skeptical of the news, remained behind, but formed a guard with several neighbors. When the band arrived, the settlers “expostulated” with them. “Their arguments prevailed, the Indians desisted, and entered into a league of peace.”

Smith claims the thwarted attack occurred soon after the Stouts married, when “about fifty families of white people” lived in Middletown. In fact, fifty settler families “could only have been assembled in this district after the Monmouth Patent had been issued by Governor Nicholls” in 1665, when the Stouts’ oldest son was about twenty. The Middletown Township Historical Society describes the first permanent settlers as “families of English extraction,” and Stillwell reports, “There is no knowledge of any Dutch in this locality until long after the Monmouth Patent was granted.”

Hart’s account, published by Edwards in 1792, makes no mention of the 1648 record which gives Penelope’s surname as Prince. His account is the original published source of the tradition that Penelope’s birth surname was “Vanprincis” or "Vanprinces," as variously reprinted. Hart sets the story too early for historical fact, claiming Penelope and her husband with the last name of Kent, voyaged to New Netherland in 1620, four years before the colony was founded. More accurately plces the voyage in 1640. Like Smith, he writes that passengers and crew survived a stranding, but left behind an “injured” man and his wife, who were soon attacked. Where Smith describes Penelope as “mangled,” Hart provides gory detail. Attackers stripped the pair, fractured Penelope’s skull, permanently damaged her left shoulder, and slit open her belly, forcing her to push her bowels back into her body and hold them in place.

Hart extends Penelope’s stay in the hollow tree to a full week and adds a detail: the approach of two Indians was preceded by a deer “with arrows sticking in it.” As in Smith’s account, an old man restrained a young man from killing Penelope, then “took her to his wigwam and cured her of her wounds.” Here the accounts diverge: where Smith says the woman remained with the Indians until settlers came looking, Hart has the old man take her to her ”countrymen” in “New York,” expecting a present in return, no doubt.” Unlike Smith, Hart doesn’t describe a continuing friendship between Penelope and the old man or his warning of imminent attack.

Descendant Nathan Stout’s 1825 manuscript was published by Stillwell in 1916. Unlike Smith and Hart, Nathan Stout places the ship stranding on the shore of what’s now Middletown and claims the ship’s crew and passengers were all “butchered and killed” in an Indian attack, save “Penelope Van Prince,” who was left for dead and hid in a hollow tree for “several days” with a “number of severe wounds to her head and back.” When the Stout manuscript was edited for publication in 1908 as The History of the Stout Family, three changes were made that brought the text more closely in line with Hart’s published account. The spelling of Penelope’s surname became “Van Princes,” her stay in the hollow tree was lengthened to seven days, and the description of her injuries newly included the claim that she was disemboweled: “She was bruised very severely about the head, and her bowels protruded from a cut across her abdomen: she kept them in with her hand.”

Nathan Stout departs from both Hart and Smith when writing that Penelope was found by a lone Indian and his dog. The man was moved by “compassion” and carried Penelope to his home “where he treated her kindly and healed her wounds.” Like Hart, Nathan Stout claims the Indian took Penelope to New Amsterdam where he “sold her to the Dutch,” and he makes no reference to a warning of an attack. Nathan Stout repeats the historical error of assuming Penelope and Richard “immediately crossed the bay” after marrying and settled Middletown in 1648 with five other white families. In fact, Middletown was founded on land purchased from the Lenape by Stout and others in the Monmouth Patent dated 8 April 1665.

Eighth-generation Stout descendant Therese Seabrook (1821-1899) also wrongly dates the settlement of Middletown to 1648. She includes the old Indian’s warning in her version of the tale. But unlike Hart, who claims the Indian hid a canoe so the Stouts could escape, Seabrook gives the starring role to her ancestor, “Penelope Van Prince,” who gathers the settlers and leads them to the bay shore, where they spend the night offshore in canoes, “it being too dark to go any place across the water.” Where Hart has the villagers confront their would-be attackers at midnight, Seabrook has them meet the following day.

In their History of the Early Settlers of Sangamon County, Illinois (1876), John C. and Sarah A. Power describe the Stout family’s “origin in America” as “quite romantic.” Franklin Ellis cites Smith and Hart-Edwards when referencing Penelope’s survival story in his History of Monmouth County, New Jersey (1885).

The Powers’ account diverges dramatically from versions found in east coast histories, perhaps reflecting changes to the oral tradition as tellers of the tale moved west. In it, a woman known only as “Penelope” and her unnamed husband emigrate to New Netherland in “1680 or ’90,” an obvious historical error: Penelope testified in Gravesend in 1648, and the Dutch lost their colony to the English in 1664. In the Powers’ telling only, the story begins “near the Port of New Amsterdam” with a shipwreck in which “nearly all on board drowned.” Those who made it to shore were immediately ambushed. Penelope’s husband was killed; she survived and sheltered for “a day or two” in a “hollow log.” The Powers are the first to claim Penelope was “scalped.” The account again differs from earlier tellings by claiming that three Indians (“savages”) discovered Penelope. The chief “restrained” the two with “uplifted tomahawks,” motivated not by compassion, but “gain”: “He took his prisoner to New Amsterdam and there received a ransom for her.” The Powers’ account is the only version of the story that credits Europeans, rather than the Lenape, with Penelope’s “proper surgical treatment and nursing.”

In his 1890 History of Monmouth and Ocean Counties, Edwin Salter describes Penelope Stout’s “remarkable history” as “too well known to repeat.” Frank Stockton does more than repeat the tale in his 1896 Stories of New Jersey; he expands it by conflating the Smith and Hart-Edwards accounts, arbitrarily eliminating conflicts, inventing details, and employing racist stereotypes. Rutgers University Press republished his book in 1961. In Stockton’s opening scene, the Lenape become “bloodthirsty redmen” and “savages” who set upon Penelope’s husband “very much as a boy would kill a little harmless snake, for no reason whatever, except that he was able to do it.” And Penelope becomes the wounded deer of Hart’s tale when the older of the two Indians who discover her in a hollow tree carries her on his back “as if she had been a deer wounded by some other hunters.”

Stockton imagines Penelope’s time in the Lenape village: “living in a wigwam,” “pounding corn, cooking food,” and “not daring even to try to escape, for in that wild country there was no place of safety to which it was possible for her to flee.” As in Smith (but not Hart), settlers hear word of a white woman among the Indians. When they arrive, Stockton has the “good Indian” make a case for her to remain among her friends, where she had “everything to make her comfortable and happy,” while in New Amsterdam, she would find only “the people who had rowed away and left her.” As in Smith, she leaves the village, Stockton adds, “much to the regret of her Indian friends.”

Stockton follows Smith (but not Hart) in recounting the old Indian’s warning of a planned “massacre.” Stockton places the event in the “little village” of Middletown and dates it to the early years of Penelope’s marriage, when she was the mother of “two little children,” a detail not found in earlier accounts. In fact, Penelope was the mother of at least seven (the oldest about twenty) when she and her husband helped found Middletown in 1664. Stockton follows Hart (but not Smith) in claiming without primary sourcing that Penelope lived to be 110.

Like the Powers, Stockton ends his account by noting that Penelope son's Jonathan founded the Baptist Church in Hopewell, a fact noted first by Rev. Hart. While all mention that the congregation met in Stout family homes for many years, none mentions that people were enslaved in those homes. At the time of his death, Jonathan Stout owned three people: two “negro girls” valued at £20 and a “negro man” worth £35. Even as history, theirs is a selective retelling.

In the past century, Penelope's story has continued to change. In his 1926 American Marriages before 1699, William Montgomery Clemens claims without documentation that Penelope was the daughter of a "Kent or Lent" and the widow of a "Von Printzen." No corresponding records have been discovered. Clemens puts the Stouts' marriage in Gravesend in 1645. " Once introduced, however, the name "Kent" remained attached to the tale. In his 1951 Stout and Other Families, Herald F. Stout rejects 1634-5 as a plausible date of marriage, but tentatively accepts Clemens' other claims, hypothesizing that Penelope was born, "presumably in Amsterdam, Holland in 1622, perhaps of dissenting English parents, which would account for her reported maiden name of Kent or Lent." In 1999, Carole Chandler Waldrup treats "Kent" as a first name and identifies the legend's murdered husband as "Kent Van Prinicis" in her Colonial Women: 23 Europeans Who Helped Build a Nation. Evelyn Ogden retains the surnames given by Clemens, but reverses their roles in her 2017 "biographical sketch" of "Penelope Van Princis" for the Descendants of the Founders of New Jersey. In her account, Penelope is the Amsterdam-born daughter of “Baron VanPrincis (a.k.a. Van Prinzen)” and the wife of "John Kent." Like Clemens, Ogden and Waldrup fail to provide historical evidence for their claims.

No primary source provides evidence of Penelope’s marriage to anyone other than Richard Stout. And there’s no evidence whatsoever that Penelope Stout was a Dutch baron’s daughter. Indeed, in the absence of birth or emigration records, there’s no evidence that she was Dutch. She had an English name, lived in the English village of Gravesend, married Englishman Richard Stout, and gave her children English first names.

== Richard and Penelope Stout ==
Penelope's Gravesend testimony puts her in New Netherland in 1648, but estimates of her children's ages based on a 1675 land claim suggest she was in the colony by 1643-4. Richard Stout arrived in New Netherland in 1643. A native of Nottinghamshire, Stout spent seven years in the Royal Navy before he received his discharge in New Amsterdam and elected to remain in the colony. Records show that Stout was impressed into military service defending Fort Amsterdam that spring during fighting that “jeopardized the very existence of the Dutch settlements.” Known as Kieft's War, the violence began on 25 February when Dutch Governor Willem Kieft ordered simultaneous massacres of the Weckquaesgeek in Corlears Hook (Manhattan) and the Tappan (Lenape) in Pavonia (now Jersey City), killing 120 native women, men, and children.

In June 1643, Lady Deborah Moody founded the English village of Gravesend on what was then Dutch Long Island, seeking religious tolerance that was denied her in Puritan New England. Moody, like the Stouts, was Baptist. Stout was in Gravesend by 13 October 1643 when he made a statement about the theft of 200 pumpkins. The Stouts' 1675 land claim suggests their oldest child was probably born in 1644-5, making it likely the couple married in 1643-4. On 19 December 1645, Stout was among the 39 men issued the original patents for land in the new village. He received plantation lot sixteen in the first allotment of house lots and farms on 20 February 1646. Eight months later, on 26 October 1646, he sold his tobacco crop. In 1657, he had seventeen of his twenty acres under cultivation, and on 5 April 1661, he bought the adjoining plantation.

In early December 1663, a party of Gravesend settlers traveled up the Raritan River, prospecting for land. No progress was made until after the English won control of New Netherland in 1664. The Stouts permanently settled in New Jersey in 1664. The 7 April 1665 Monmouth Patent identifies him as one of twelve men who bought land from the Lenape. In 1675, Stout reported the land he was due: “Richard Stout brings for his rights, for the year 1665, for his wife, two sons, John and Richard, 120 acres each; total 480 acres.” He obtained an additional sixty acres each for five children James, Peter, Mary, Alice, and Sarah, bringing his total claim to 780 acres. Three additional children brought the total to ten, but Jonathan, Benjamin, and David “were evidently under the age of 14 in 1675,” or they would have been entitled to thirty acres each.

The Stouts and, separately, their oldest son John received land in the first division of town lots. Despite illiteracy, Richard Stout was “frequently elected to fill responsible positions in the conduct of the town’s public business.” He was an Overseer of Highways and a member of the Constables Court. On 26 Feb 1679-80, “Richard and Penelope Stout” sold a house, barn, orchard, and acreage. In 1686, Richard Stout owned 460 acres and produced 20 bushels of wheat and 26 bushels of Indian corn, but received a tax abatement because he was “very old.”

Stout wrote his will on 9 June 1703, leaving his (unnamed) “loving wife” his orchard and “that part of or room of the house she now lives in with the cellar and all the land I now Improve,” as well as his horses, excepting a mare and colt, which he left to son Benjamin, as thanks for wintering his cattle the previous year (spelling modernized). The will names nine of the Stout children. Son Peter alone predeceased his parents. Richard Stout died before 6 October 1705, when the inventory of his estate was recorded and valued at £64.8.0. The abstract reports it contained “mostly hogs, cattle, horses and sheep.”

Hart is the sole source for two widely adopted claims about the Stouts’ ages. He cites no records—no church registers, town documents, or headstones—and simply recounts Penelope’s story as told by third- and fourth-generation descendants. Evidence shows he misdated the historical events in his account by decades.

First, Hart claims Richard was 40 when he married in 1624. If Hart were right, Stout would have been born in 1584 and 121 when he died. In fact, records show the couple married in about 1644. If Richard were 40 in that year, he would have been born in 1604 and 101 when he died. But as Thomas Streets notes, “no claim has been made in any account of him that he attained great longevity,” including Hart’s, which makes no mention of Stout’s year of—or age at—death.

Stout’s year of birth is estimated to be “about 1615” by the Descendants of the Founders of New Jersey, presumably based on the fact that Stout spent seven years in the Navy before being discharged in 1643. If he joined at 21, his year of birth would be 1615. He would have been about 29 when he married and about 90 when he died.

Second, Hart claims Penelope was born in 1602, emigrated in 1620, married in 1624, and died in 1712 at age 110. In fact, the 1675 land claim that puts the Stouts’ marriage in about 1644 also gives their children’s years of birth as about 1645-1669. If Prince married at 22 (as widely assumed), she was born in 1622-3, was 23 to 47 when she had her children, and about 83 when widowed. No known records document her life after Stout’s will was proven, making it impossible to confirm or deny Hart’s claim that she lived to be 110. However, records force us to reject every other date in Hart’s account. Neither Nathan Stout nor Therese Seabrook mentions their ancestor’s age at death, and Smith writes only that she lived a “long life.”

Thus, based on existing records, Penelope Stout was likely born in 1622-3. She died after 23 October 1705 when Richard Stout’s will was proven. Her place of burial is in Middletown, NJ.

== Chronological List of Sources: Stout Legend ==
1. Smith, Samuel (1765). From The History of the Colony of Nova-Caesaria, or New Jersey. Quoted in Stillwell, p. 296-97.
2. Hart, Oliver (1791). From Morgan Edwards' Materials Towards A History Of The Baptists in Jersey. Quoted in Stillwell, p. 297.
3. Stout, Nathan (1825). Manuscript. Quoted in Stillwell, p. 298.
4. Power, John Carroll and Sarah A. Power (1876). History of the Early Settlers of Sangamon County, Illinois. Edwin A. Wilson & Co., p. 690-91.
5. Seabrook, Therese (before 1899). Quoted in Stillwell, p. 298.
6. Stockton, Frank R. Stories of New Jersey , 1896. Reprinted by Rutgers University Press, 1961, p. 57-69.
7. Stout, Nathan (1906). The History of the Stout Family. J.B. Stout, p. 3.
8. Stillwell, John Edwin (1916). “Stout of Monmouth County.” Historical and Genealogical Miscellany: Data Relating to the Settlement and Settlers of New York and New Jersey. New York, n.p., p. 295-306.
9. Clemens, William Montgomery (1926). American Marriage Records before 1699. The Biblio Company, p. 134.
10. Stout, Herald F. (1951). Stout and Allied Families. Dover, OH: Eagle Press. pp. xix.
11. Waldrup, Carole Chandler (1999). Colonial Women: 23 Europeans Who Helped Build a Nation. McFarland Press, p. 75.
12. Ogden, Evelyn and Richard C. Burd (2017). "Penelope van Princis (Kent, Stout). " New Jersey Founders.

== Further reading: History, Legend, Fiction, Poetry ==
- Adane, Virginie. The Penelope Stout Story: Evolution of a New Netherland Narrative. The Holland Society of New York, 2009. HAL Open Archives.
- Baer, Mabel V. D. "Richard Stout and Some Descendants." National Genealogical Society Quarterly, vol. 52, 1964, pages 86–94.
- McFarlane, Jim. Penelope: A Novel of New Amsterdam. Greer, SC: Twisted Cedar Press, 2012. 371 pages.
- Schott, Penelope S. Penelope: The Story of the Half-Scalped Woman: A Narrative Poem. Gainesville: University Press of Florida, 1999, 64 pages.
- Stansfield, Charles A., Jr. Haunted Jersey Shore: Ghosts and Strange Phenomena of the Garden State Coast. Stackpole Books, 2005. p 25-6.
- Stout, Herald F. Some of the Descendants of Richard Stout of New Jersey. Glendale, CA, 1940, 92 pages.
- Stout, Wayne D. Genealogy of the Sagers, Fisk, and Stout Families, Salt Lake City, UT, 1960, 583 pages.
