= Mount Mitchill =

Mountain in New Jersey, United States

Coordinates: 40.4068°N 74.0065°W

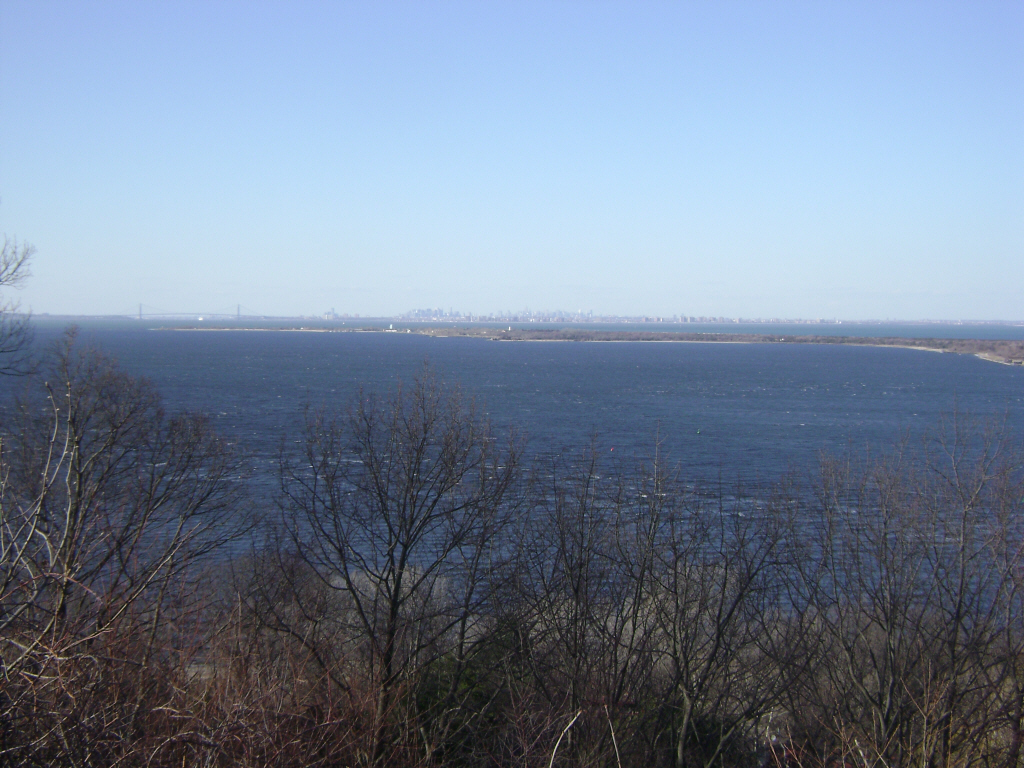
View from the Mount Mitchill overlook

Mount Mitchill is located in Atlantic Highlands, Monmouth County, New Jersey, United States. Standing at 266 feet (81 meters), it is the highest headland of the United States east coast south of Maine. It has a panoramic view of Raritan Bay, New York City and Sandy Hook and is near the Twin Lights Lighthouse in Highlands. It is the location of the Monmouth County September 11th Memorial. It was named after Samuel Latham Mitchill, who determined the height of the hill.

== See also ==
- Todt Hill
- Raritan Bayshore
