= Handball (wall game) =

Handball is a sport in which players hit a ball with a hand or fist against a wall in such a way as to make a shot the opposition cannot return. It has variants:

- American handball
- Australian handball
- Gaelic handball
- Fives

== See also ==
- Handball (disambiguation), for handball games not involving a wall
