= Major John Burrowes Mansion =

Historic house in New Jersey, United States

- U.S. National Register of Historic Places
- New Jersey Register of Historic Places
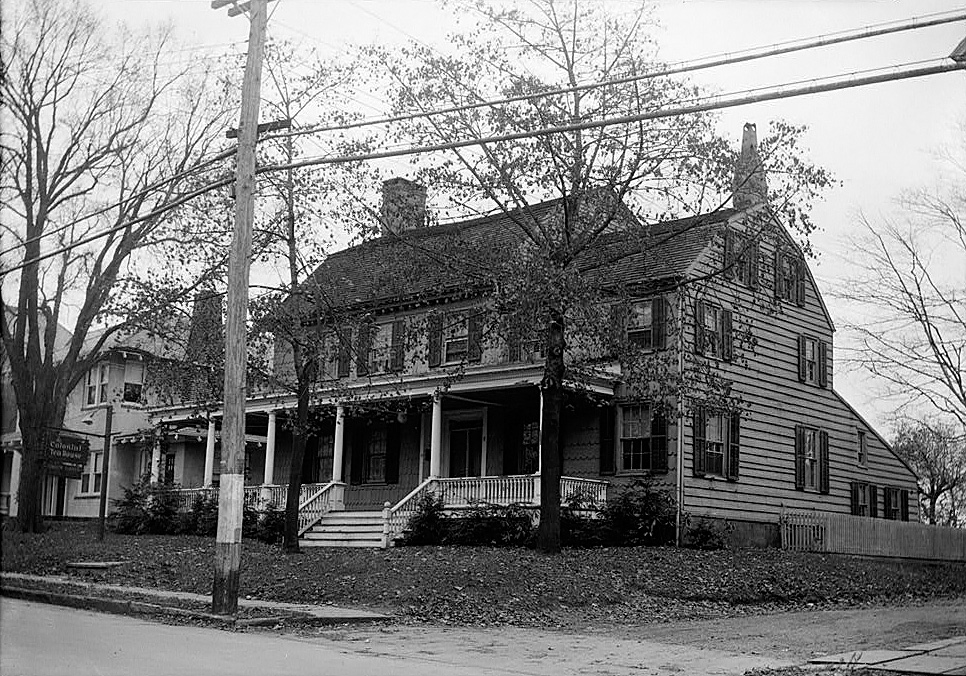

- Location within Monmouth County, New Jersey Location within New Jersey Location within the United States
- Location: 94 Main Street, Matawan, New Jersey
- Coordinates: 40°25′0″N 74°13′46″W
- Area: 1.4 acres (0.57 ha)
- Built: 1723
- Architect: Burrowes, John
- NRHP reference No.: 72000803
- NJRHP No.: 2016

Significant dates
- Added to NRHP: September 29, 1972
- Designated NJRHP: March 17, 1972

Major John Burrowes Mansion is located in Matawan, Monmouth County, New Jersey, United States. The mansion was built in 1723 and was added to the National Register of Historic Places on September 29, 1972. It was added to the New Jersey Register of Historic Places on March 17, 1972. The mansion is now a museum and is the headquarters of the Matawan Historical Society.

The mansion, located at 94 Main Street, is a half Georgian style mansion, built by John Bownes III. The exterior of the house contains hand-scalloped wooden shingle siding.

The mansion was previously two separate structures: the original house, and the wings to the mansion, which joined the full structure around the beginning of the nineteenth century. The house has been recently restored and still maintains its colonial appearance. John Bowne's original house was thirty by thirty square feet.

== Major John Burrowes ==
Major John "Corn King" Burrowes Sr., a wealthy grain merchant, purchased the house in 1769 and it became known as the "Burrowes Mansion." Burrowes was a member of the Sons of Liberty and was an ardent support of the Patriots during the Revolutionary War.

The mansion is the site where the first New Jersey Company of the Continental Army formed, as John Burrowes Jr. trained local militia in his front yard. Burrowes supplied various provisions to the Continental Army and allowed his home to be used as a training and mustering station for the first New Jersey Company of the Continental Army. The main food source he supplied the men was his corn stock, which earned him the "Corn King" nickname.

== Revolutionary War skirmish ==
On May 27, 1778, the mansion was the site of a skirmish between the Patriots and the British during the Revolutionary War. Local Patriots used whaleboats stored in Lake Matawan to attack British ships in the Raritan Bay. In response, British General Cortlandt Skinner, leading his Loyalist "Skinner's Greens", attacked Matawan with the (successful) intention of burning down the warehouses and mills owned by Burrowes and to capture Burrowes Jr. 200 Greens made their way from Sandy Hook, and greatly outnumbered the Matawan Patriots. Burrowes Jr. was able to avoid capture by swimming across Matawan Creek and hide, however Burrowes Sr. and several other Patriots were captured.

Nearby, a house on Ravine Drive was owned by Samuel Forman, a wealthy merchant and Continental Army colonel and business partner with John Burrowes Sr. Forman had three sons, all of which became officers in the Continental Army, with the oldest Johnathan becoming a general. Of his four daughters, two married prominent local men, with Margaret marrying John Burrowes Jr. (where she was attacked by the loyalists during the skirmish at the Burrowes Mansion) and Eleanor marrying Philip Freneau, who was known as the "Poet of the Revolution". On May 23, 1779, there was another skirmish between the American militia and British troops near the Forman house, and the militia successfully forced the British to retreat down a hill and swim across the Matawan Creek into the Raritan Bay. The house became nicknamed the "Old Hospital" because many wounded soldiers were treated in the house.

== See also ==
- National Register of Historic Places listings in Monmouth County, New Jersey
- The Burrowes Mansion of Matawan, New Jersey, and Notations on the History of Monmouth County. Dieker (Koegler), Mary Lou. 1978.
