= John Colman =

English sailor murdered in 1609

John Colman (died September 6, 1609) was a crew member of the Half Moon under Henry Hudson who was killed by Native Americans by an arrow to his neck.

== Biography ==
On September 6, 1609, only five days after the arrival of the first Dutch and English sailors, John Colman was reportedly killed by attacking Native Americans by an arrow to his neck. Colman was an "accomplished sailor" and served as second mate on Henry Hudson's ship. The Half Moon sailed into New York Harbor and was anchored between Coney Island and Sandy Hook. Colman was part of a five-man crew that was aboard a rowboat that was scouting the area. Allegedly, two Lenape canoes filled with Native Americans attacked and fired a volley of arrows, killing Colman and wounding two others. The survivors of the attack returned to the Half Moon at 10 a.m. on September 7, 1609, with Colman's body. He was buried that day at one of four possible locations (referred to by their present-day names): Coney Island, Staten Island, Sandy Hook or Keansburg, New Jersey. The now-forgotten location was then named Colman's Point. A contemporary account of his death was written in the journal of Robert Juet, the first mate of the Half Moon. The most likely point of Coleman's burial may have been Sandy Hook, or "Coleman's Point".

He was shot in the throat by an arrow: and as he had been a companion of Hudson's in his Polar adventures, having burind him on the beach, he named Sandy Hook "Coleman's Point," in honor of him

— Excerpt from The Catskill Mountains and the Region Around, 1867

== Legacy ==
The murder of John Colman was the basis for a poem by Thomas Frost, "The Death of Colman", where he writes:

Then prone he fell within the boat,
A flinthead arrow through his throat
And now full many a stealthy skiff
Shot out into the bay;
And swiftly, sadly, pulled we back
To where the Half Moon lay;
But he was dead our master wept
He smiled, brave heart, as though he slept.

His death is commemorated by a mural at the Hudson County Courthouse in Jersey City. The New York Times has called it "the first recorded murder in what became metropolitan New York".

People of the Hudson Highlands area believed that Colman's spirit became the Dwerg, Heer of Dunderberg, a goblin who dresses in Dutch clothing and who raises storms to sink ships at World's End, the area just north of West Point where the Hudson is over 200 feet deep. The Heer appears in writings by Washington Irving.

Evan Pritchard, author of Henry Hudson and the Algonquins of New York, speculates the attack on Colman occurred because he strayed too near a wampum making outpost, provoking a preemptive strike by wary Native peoples living near Manhattan.

== See also ==
- Penelope Stout
