= Navesink Twin Lights =

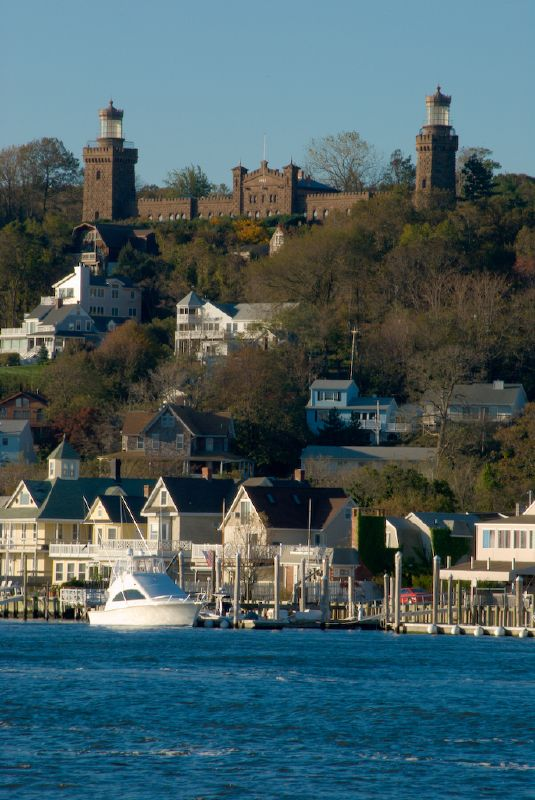
- The historic Twin Lights of Highlands, New Jersey, U.S.
- Location: Highlands, New Jersey
- Coordinates: 40°23′46.4″N 73°59′8.8″W
- Constructed: 1862
- Automated: 1949
- Power source: lard, kerosene, electricity
- Heritage: National Register of Historic Places listed place, National Historic Landmark

Light
- First lit: 1862
- Deactivated: 1898 (north tower); 1952 (south tower) north tower relit in 1962
- Lens: sixth order Fresnel lens
- Navesink Light Station
- U.S. National Register of Historic Places
- U.S. National Historic Landmark District
- New Jersey Register of Historic Places
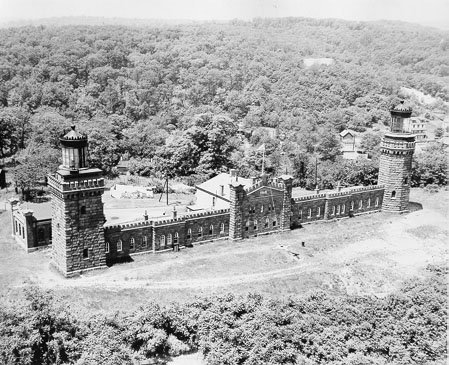
- Navesink Light Station
- Architect: Joseph Lederle
- NRHP reference No.: 70000389 Twin Lights 06000237 Landmark
- NJRHP No.: 1980

Significant dates
- Added to NRHP: December 2, 1970
- Designated NHLD: February 17, 2006
- Designated NJRHP: September 11, 1980

The Navesink Twin Lights is a non-operational lighthouse and museum located in Highlands, Monmouth County, New Jersey, United States, overlooking Sandy Hook Bay, the entrance to New York Harbor, and the Atlantic Ocean. The Twin Lights, as the name implies, are a pair of beacons located 246 feet (75 m) above sea level on the headlands of the Navesink Highlands.

In 1962, the State of New Jersey acquired Twin Lights. The museum offers tours of the lighthouse, and a climb of the North Tower. Twin Lights is listed on the State and National Register of Historic Places, and was designated a National Historic Landmark in 2006 for its architecture and its role in the development of lighthouse technologies.

The Twin Lights State Historic Site is part of the New Jersey Coastal Heritage Trail Route.

== History ==
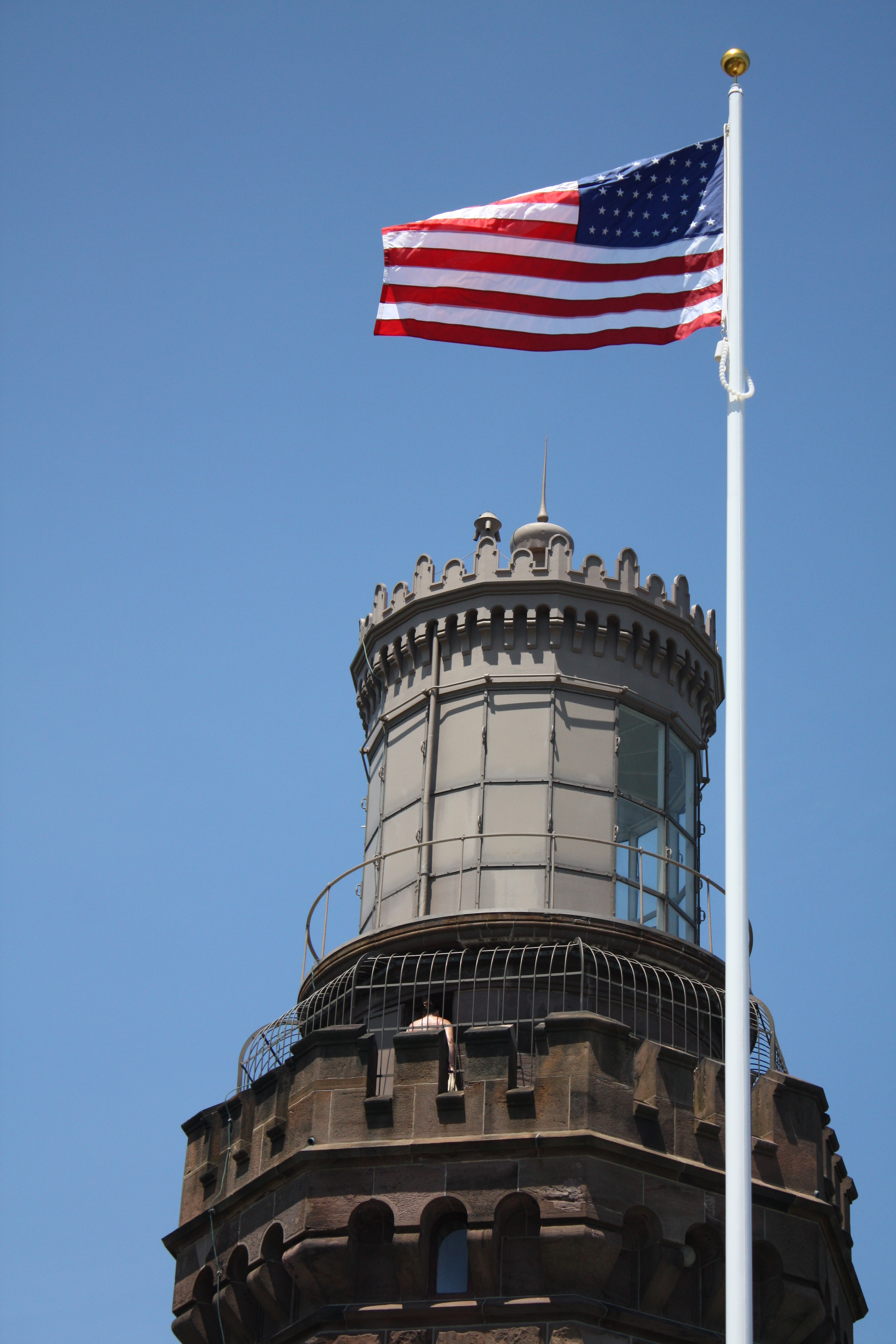
A tower of the Twin Lights on the Navesink

A lighthouse existed on the site since 1828, when it became an important guide and landmark for ships navigating the treacherous entrances to New York Harbor.

The current lighthouse was constructed in 1862. The non-identical towers by day and the two beacons by night—one flashing and one fixed—allowed ready identification by mariners of the identity of the facility, thus allowing a rough determination of their location approaching the harbor.

This was the first American lighthouse to test a Fresnel lens and was also the site of a demonstration by Marconi of the wireless telegraph in 1899. A bi-valve fresnel lens is on display in the museum.

The north tower light was discontinued in 1898; at the same time the south tower was electrified, one of the first lighthouses in the United States to do so. It was automated in 1949, but was discontinued in 1952 as the importance of the light diminished.

In 1962, the site was turned over to the state of New Jersey, by the Borough of Highlands. The sixth order lens was previously acquired and installed in the north tower by the Shrewsbury Power Squadron and presented to the town which reactivated the north tower as a private aid to navigation. This light remains active.
