= Lebenthal =

Lebenthal is a surname. Notable people with the surname include:

- Alexandra Lebenthal (born 1964), American businesswoman, President and CEO of Lebenthal & Company
- James A. Lebenthal (1928–2014), American businessperson, author, copywriter, and filmmaker
- Sayra Fischer Lebenthal (1898–1994), American banker
