= Keyport, New Jersey =

Borough in Monmouth County, New Jersey, US

- Borough
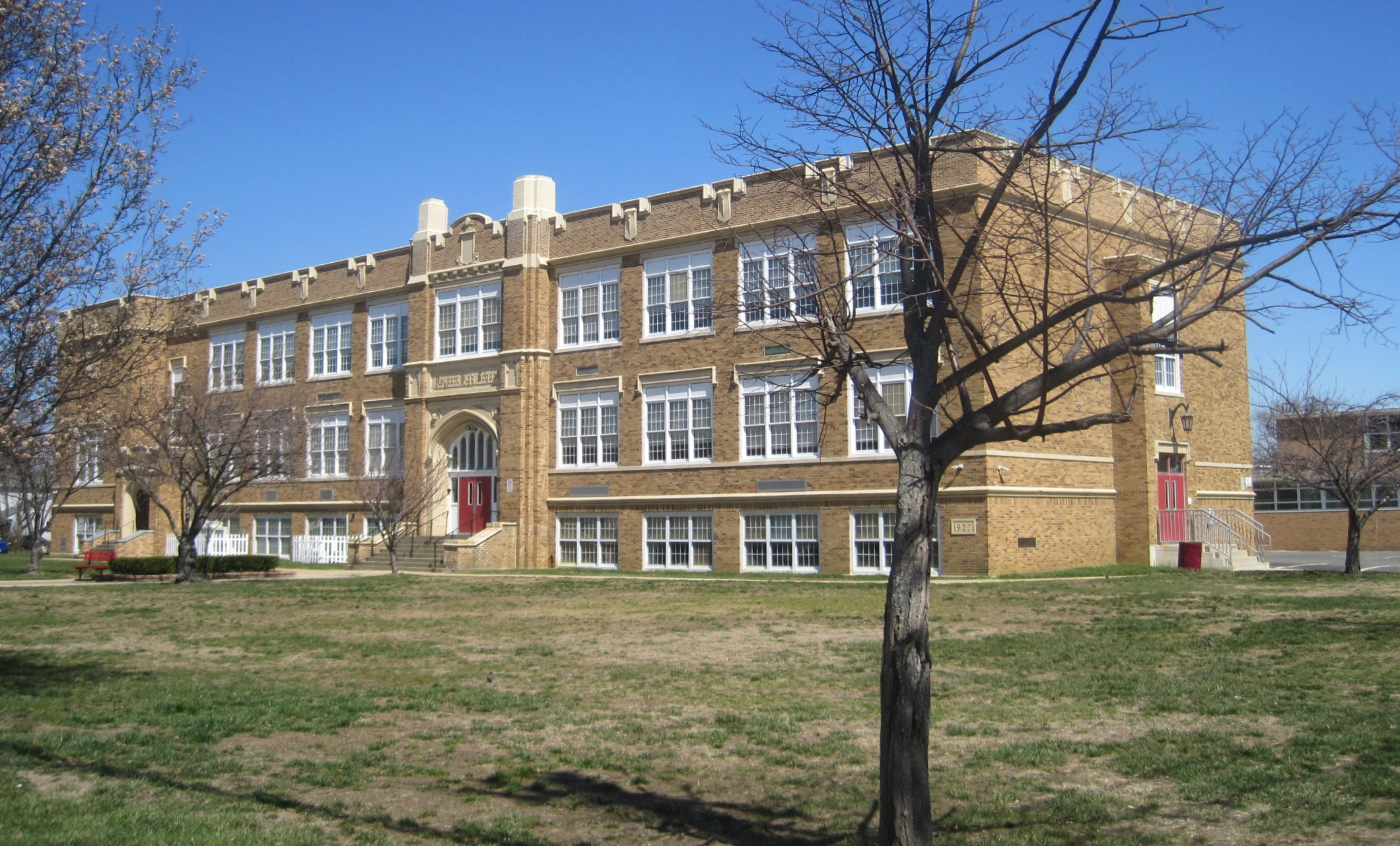
- Keyport High School

- Seal
- Nickname: "Pearl of the Bayshore"
- Map of Keyport in Monmouth County. Inset: Location of Monmouth County highlighted in the State of New Jersey.

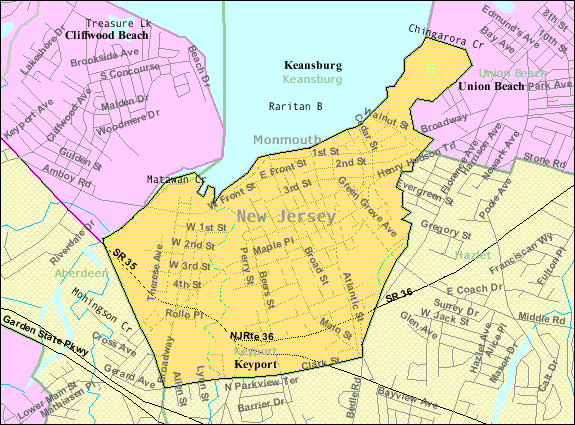
- Census Bureau map of Keyport, New Jersey

- Location in Monmouth County Location in New Jersey Location in the United States
- Coordinates: 40.432626°N 74.200342°W
- Country: United States
- State: New Jersey
- County: Monmouth
- Incorporated: April 2, 1908

Government
  - Type: Borough
  - Body: Borough Council
  - Mayor: Rose P. Araneo (R, term ends December 31, 2026)
  - Administrator: Kimberly Humphrey
  - Municipal Clerk: Michele Clark

Area
  - Total: 1.46 sq mi (3.77 km^{2})
  - Land: 1.38 sq mi (3.58 km^{2})
  - Water: 0.073 sq mi (0.19 km^{2}) 5.07%
  - Rank: 455th of 565 in state 37th of 53 in county
- Elevation: 26 ft (7.9 m)

Population (2020)
  - Total: 7,204
  - Estimate (2023): 7,099
  - Rank: 315th of 565 in state 25th of 53 in county
  - Density: 5,215.5/sq mi (2,013.7/km^{2})
  - Rank: 109th of 565 in state 11th of 53 in county
- Time zone: UTC−05:00 (Eastern (EST))
  - Summer (DST): UTC−04:00 (Eastern (EDT))
- ZIP Code: 07735
- Area code: 732
- FIPS code: 3402536810
- GNIS feature ID: 0885268
- Website: www.keyportonline.com

Keyport is a borough in northern Monmouth County, in the U.S. state of New Jersey. A waterfront community located on the Raritan Bay in the Raritan Valley region, the borough is a commuter town of New York City in the New York metropolitan area. As of the 2020 United States census, the borough's population was 7,204, a decrease of 36 (−0.5%) from the 2010 census count of 7,240, which in turn reflected a decline of 328 (−4.3%) from the 7,568 counted in the 2000 census. Keyport's nickname is the "Pearl of the Bayshore" or the "Gateway to the Bayshore".

Keyport was originally formed as a town on March 17, 1870, from portions of Raritan Township (now Hazlet). On April 2, 1908, the Borough of Keyport was formed, replacing Keyport Town.

Keyport was part of the Bayshore Regional Strategic Plan, an effort by nine municipalities in northern Monmouth County to reinvigorate the area's economy by emphasizing the traditional downtowns, dense residential neighborhoods, maritime history, and the natural Raritan Bayshore coastline. The plan has since been integrated into the 2016 Monmouth County Master Plan. According to the Monmouth County Master Plan, Keyport is one of eight municipalities that has been designated as an Arts, Cultural, and Entertainment (ACE) Hub, which is defined as municipalities that have a high concentration of arts and cultural activities to serve as a destination for both visitors and locals, usually including an active nightlife scene in proximity to said cultural activities.

== History ==
The Great Fire of September 21, 1877, caused significant damage to Keyport, including extensive sections of the main business district. A total of 31 buildings were destroyed, resulting in losses from the fire of $160,000 (equivalent to $4,800,000 in 2025). Local firefighters only had access to water from a cistern and could not pump water directly from the nearby Raritan Bay. Properties destroyed in the fire included the boyhood home of Garret Hobart, future Vice President of the United States.

== Geography ==
According to the United States Census Bureau, the borough had a total area of 1.46 square miles (3.77 km^{2}), including 1.38 square miles (3.58 km^{2}) of land and 0.07 square miles (0.19 km^{2}) of water (5.07%).

The borough borders Union Beach (which shares the same postal zip code) and the townships of Aberdeen and Hazlet to the northeast, southwest and southeast respectively.

== Demographics ==
Historical population
Census	Pop.	Note	%±
1870	2,366		—
1890	3,411		—
1900	3,413		0.1%
1910	3,554		4.1%
1920	4,415		24.2%
1930	4,940		11.9%
1940	5,147		4.2%
1950	5,888		14.4%
1960	6,440		9.4%
1970	7,205		11.9%
1980	7,413		2.9%
1990	7,586		2.3%
2000	7,568		−0.2%
2010	7,240		−4.3%
2020	7,204		−0.5%
2023 (est.)	7,099	▼	−1.5%
Population sources: 1870–1920 1870 1880–1890; 1890–1910 1910–1930 1940–2000; 2000 2010 2020

=== 2020 census ===
As of the 2020 census, Keyport had a population of 7,204. The median age was 43.6 years. 17.7% of residents were under the age of 18 and 19.0% of residents were 65 years of age or older. For every 100 females there were 93.8 males, and for every 100 females age 18 and over there were 92.9 males age 18 and over.

100.0% of residents lived in urban areas, while 0.0% lived in rural areas.

There were 3,202 households in Keyport, of which 22.5% had children under the age of 18 living in them. Of all households, 35.6% were married-couple households, 23.5% were households with a male householder and no spouse or partner present, and 32.2% were households with a female householder and no spouse or partner present. About 38.7% of all households were made up of individuals and 18.3% had someone living alone who was 65 years of age or older.

There were 3,427 housing units, of which 6.6% were vacant. The homeowner vacancy rate was 1.1% and the rental vacancy rate was 6.9%.

Racial composition as of the 2020 census
Race	Number	Percent
White	5,015	69.6%
Black or African American	426	5.9%
American Indian and Alaska Native	30	0.4%
Asian	227	3.2%
Native Hawaiian and Other Pacific Islander	1	0.0%
Some other race	710	9.9%
Two or more races	795	11.0%
Hispanic or Latino (of any race)	1,572	21.8%

=== 2010 census ===
The 2010 United States census counted 7,240 people, 3,067 households, and 1,693 families in the borough. The population density was 5,188.4 per square mile (2,003.3/km^{2}). There were 3,272 housing units at an average density of 2,344.8 per square mile (905.3/km^{2}). The racial makeup was 80.00% (5,792) White, 7.20% (521) Black or African American, 0.28% (20) Native American, 2.38% (172) Asian, 0.03% (2) Pacific Islander, 7.62% (552) from other races, and 2.50% (181) from two or more races. Hispanic or Latino of any race were 18.26% (1,322) of the population.

Of the 3,067 households, 23.4% had children under the age of 18; 39.7% were married couples living together; 11.0% had a female householder with no husband present and 44.8% were non-families. Of all households, 37.3% were made up of individuals and 19.0% had someone living alone who was 65 years of age or older. The average household size was 2.35 and the average family size was 3.15.

19.8% of the population were under the age of 18, 8.5% from 18 to 24, 28.9% from 25 to 44, 27.1% from 45 to 64, and 15.8% who were 65 years of age or older. The median age was 40.5 years. For every 100 females, the population had 97.2 males. For every 100 females ages 18 and older there were 95.6 males.

The Census Bureau's 2006–2010 American Community Survey showed that (in 2010 inflation-adjusted dollars) median household income was $56,509 (with a margin of error of +/− $7,915) and the median family income was $82,714 (+/− $13,757). Males had a median income of $56,156 (+/− $6,693) versus $41,782 (+/− $4,326) for females. The per capita income for the borough was $28,545 (+/− $2,210). About 4.9% of families and 9.5% of the population were below the poverty line, including 14.6% of those under age 18 and 8.0% of those age 65 or over.

=== 2000 census ===
At the 2000 United States census, there were 7,568 people, 3,264 households and 1,798 families residing in the borough. The population density was 5,358.4 inhabitants per square mile (2,068.9/km^{2}). There were 3,400 housing units at an average density of 2,407.3 per square mile (929.5/km^{2}). The racial makeup of the borough was 85.2% White, 7.0% African American, 0.12% Native American, 2.22% Asian, 0.04% Pacific Islander, 2.96% from other races, and 2.46% from two or more races. Hispanic or Latino of any race were 11.09% of the population.

There were 3,264 households, of which 25.8% had children under the age of 18 living with them, 39.4% were married couples living together, 10.9% had a female householder with no husband present, and 44.9% were non-families. 38.4% of all households were made up of individuals, and 19.5% had someone living alone who was 65 years of age or older. The average household size was 2.31 and the average family size was 3.11.

21.8% of the population were under the age of 18, 7.3% from 18 to 24, 33.2% from 25 to 44, 21.6% from 45 to 64, and 16.1% who were 65 years of age or older. The median age was 38 years. For every 100 females there were 93.1 males. For every 100 females age 18 and over, there were 90.8 males.

The median household income was $43,869 and the median family income was $58,176. Males had a median income of $40,324 compared with $34,036 for females. The per capita income for the borough was $23,288. About 4.9% of families and 7.8% of the population were below the poverty line, including 4.7% of those under age 18 and 9.0% of those age 65 or over.

== Economy ==
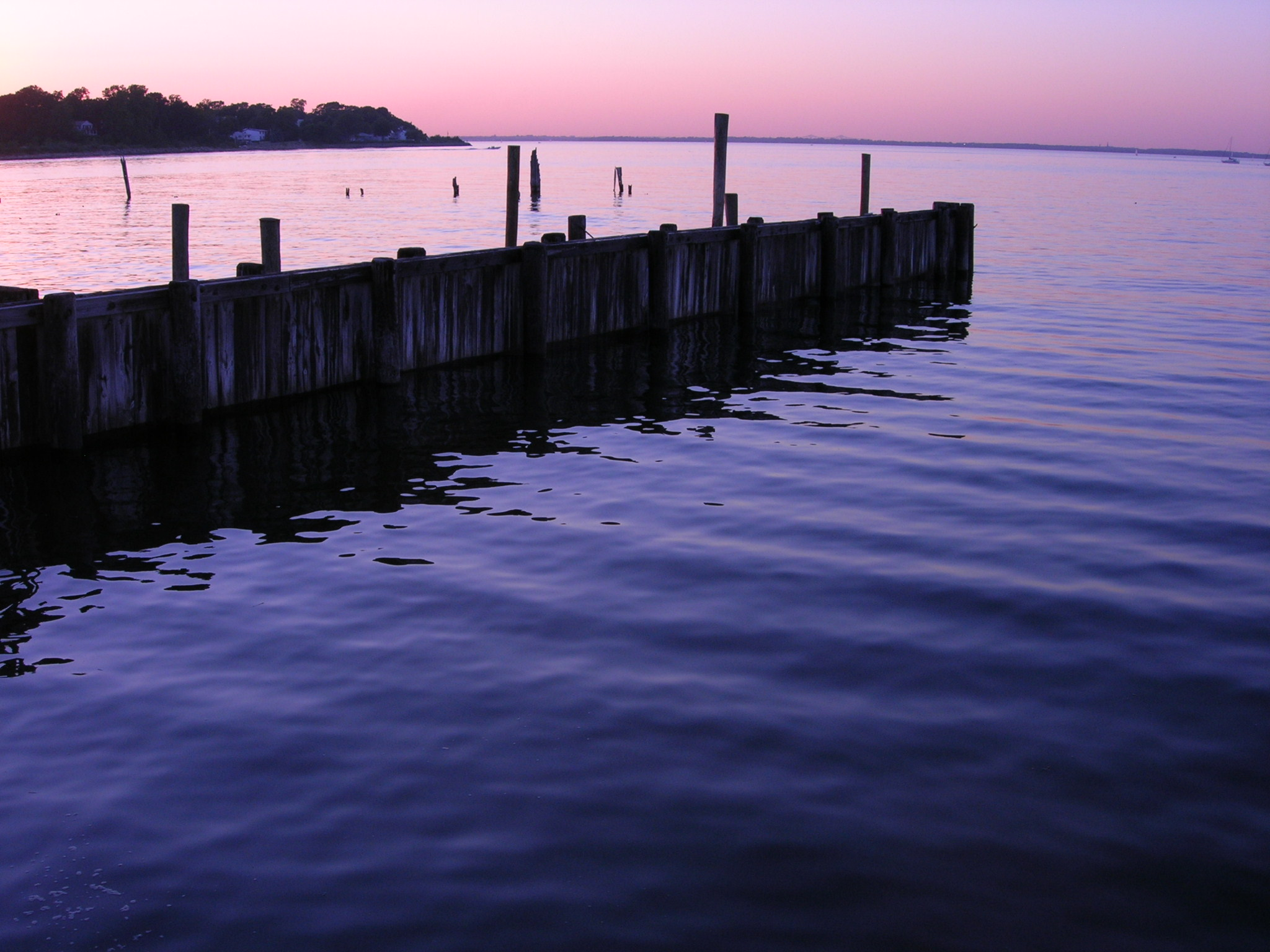
Keyport waterfront looking out into Raritan Bay

Keyport is known for its oyster industry, which had been one of the world's largest suppliers until overfishing and pollution led to a collapse of the industry in the early to mid 20th century. In August 2010, NY/NJ Baykeeper suspended an effort to recreate the oyster reefs in Keyport's Raritan Bay after the New Jersey Department of Environmental Protection cited concerns that the oysters could be harvested and sold to the public despite the persistent heavy pollution in the water after concerns had been raised by the United States Food and Drug Administration that patrols were insufficient to ensure that the oysters in the reef were not being harvested.

It was the home of the Aeromarine Plane and Motor Company which operated from 1914 to 1930 and built seaplanes for the United States Navy during World War I. Its planes were mostly military seaplanes and flying boats, including aircraft that offered some of the first scheduled air service using seaplanes.

Keyport has been credited as the birthplace of the "Lazy Susan", designed by William Bedle in 1845. However this is highly disputed since there were earlier dated pieces found in China and England. It was the site of the professional dance debut of film star Fred Astaire in 1903 at age four, together with his sister Adele, as part of an act that earned a review that called the duo "the greatest child act in vaudeville.

=== Business district ===
Keyport is home to many diverse businesses, and has a bustling shopping district located on West Front Street, located one block in from the waterfront. The business district is now under control of the Keyport Bayfront Business Cooperative (which was established in 2011 to replace the now-defunct Keyport Business Alliance) which helps to organize events that benefit the businesses in Keyport as well as the city as a whole.

Keyport is home to many restaurants, many with live music. Celebrity Chef Bobby Flay filmed a segment for CBS Sunday Morning at the Broad Street Diner, which has won numerous awards and accolades.

== Government ==
=== Local government ===
Keyport is governed under the borough form of New Jersey municipal government, which is used in 218 municipalities (of the 564) statewide, making it the most common form of government in New Jersey. The governing body is comprised of the Mayor and the Borough Council, with all positions elected at-large on a partisan basis as part of the November general election. A Mayor is elected directly by the voters to a four-year term of office. The Borough Council is comprised of six members elected to serve three-year terms on a staggered basis, with two seats coming up for election each year in a three-year cycle. The Borough form of government used by Keyport is a "weak mayor / strong council" government in which council members act as the legislative body with the mayor presiding at meetings and voting only in the event of a tie. The mayor can veto ordinances subject to an override by a two-thirds majority vote of the council.

As of 2025, the mayor of Keyport is Republican Rose P. Araneo, whose term of office ends December 31, 2026. Borough Council members are Council President Melissa Vecchio (R, 2025), Heather B. Brady (D, 2026), Stephen D. Gross (D, 2026), Joseph Merla (R, 2027), Kathleen McNamara (D, 2027), Cathleen Reilly (R, 2025).

J. Christopher Demarest was selected by the borough council in January 2023 from a list of three residents nominated by the Republican municipal committee to temporarily fill the seat expiring in December 2024 that became vacant when Rose P. Araneo took office as mayor; Demarest will serve on an interim basis until the November 2023 general election, when voters will choose a candidate to serve the balance of the term of office.

On Election Day, November 7, 2007, Council President Robert Bergen was elected Mayor, taking the seat of two-term incumbent John J. Merla who pled guilty to federal corruption charges on January 18, 2007, for accepting bribes to obtain municipal contracts. Bergen assumed the post of Mayor on January 1, 2007.

=== Federal, state and county representation ===
Keyport is located in the 6th Congressional District and is part of New Jersey's 13th state legislative district.

For the 119th United States Congress, New Jersey's 6th congressional district is represented by Frank Pallone (D, Long Branch). New Jersey is represented in the United States Senate by Democrats Cory Booker (Newark, term ends 2027) and Andy Kim (Moorestown, term ends 2031).

For the 2026–2027 session, the 13th legislative district of the New Jersey Legislature is represented in the New Jersey Senate by Declan O'Scanlon (R, Little Silver) and in the General Assembly by Vicky Flynn (R, Holmdel Township) and Gerard Scharfenberger (R, Middletown Township).

Monmouth County is governed by a Board of County Commissioners composed of five members who are elected at-large to serve three-year terms of office on a staggered basis, with either one or two seats up for election each year as part of the November general election. At an annual reorganization meeting held in the beginning of January, the board selects one of its members to serve as director and another as deputy director.

As of 2025, Monmouth County's Commissioners are Director Thomas A. Arnone (R, Neptune City, 2025), Susan M. Kiley (R, Hazlet Township, 2027), Erik Anderson (R, Shrewsbury, 2026), Nick DiRocco (R, Wall Township, 2025), and Deputy Director Ross F. Licitra (R, Marlboro Township, 2026).

Constitutional officers elected on a countywide basis are Clerk Christine Giordano Hanlon (R, 2025; Ocean Township), Sheriff Shaun Golden (R, 2025; Howell Township) and Surrogate Rosemarie D. Peters (R, 2026; Middletown Township).

=== Politics ===
United States presidential election results for Keyport
Year	Republican		Democratic		Third party(ies)	
Year	No.	%	No.	%	No.	%
2024	1,991	53.68%	1,656	44.65%	62	1.67%
2020	1,879	50.33%	1,793	48.03%	61	1.63%
2016	1,622	51.38%	1,428	45.23%	107	3.39%
2012	1,234	41.97%	1,664	56.60%	42	1.43%
2008	1,506	45.35%	1,759	52.97%	56	1.69%
2004	1,649	50.27%	1,596	48.66%	35	1.07%
2000	1,181	40.81%	1,595	55.11%	118	4.08%
1996	881	32.97%	1,458	54.57%	333	12.46%
1992	1,242	40.63%	1,217	39.81%	598	19.56%

In March 2011, there were a total of 4,442 registered voters in Keyport, of which 1,251 (28.2%) were registered as Democrats, 950 (21.4%) were registered as Republicans and 2,240 (50.4%) were registered as Unaffiliated. There was one voter registered to another party.

Gubernatorial election results for Keyport
Year	Republican		Democratic		Third party(ies)	
Year	No.	%	No.	%	No.	%
2025	1,474	49.41%	1,478	49.55%	31	1.04%
2021	1,458	57.67%	1,043	41.26%	27	1.07%
2017	943	50.84%	862	46.47%	50	2.70%
2013	1,316	67.11%	600	30.60%	45	2.29%
2009	1,284	58.26%	796	36.12%	124	5.63%
2005	947	44.23%	1,035	48.34%	159	7.43%

In the 2012 presidential election, Democrat Barack Obama received 56.6% of the vote (1,664 cast), ahead of Republican Mitt Romney with 42.0% (1,234 votes), and other candidates with 1.4% (42 votes), among the 2,970 ballots cast by the borough's 4,600 registered voters (30 ballots were spoiled), for a turnout of 64.6%. In the 2008 presidential election, Democrat Barack Obama received 52.1% of the vote (1,759 cast), ahead of Republican John McCain with 44.6% (1,506 votes) and other candidates with 1.7% (56 votes), among the 3,374 ballots cast by the borough's 4,704 registered voters, for a turnout of 71.7%. In the 2004 presidential election, Republican George W. Bush received 50.0% of the vote (1,649 ballots cast), outpolling Democrat John Kerry with 48.4% (1,596 votes) and other candidates with 0.8% (35 votes), among the 3,297 ballots cast by the borough's 4,620 registered voters, for a turnout percentage of 71.4.

In the 2013 gubernatorial election, Republican Chris Christie received 67.1% of the vote (1,316 cast), ahead of Democrat Barbara Buono with 30.6% (600 votes), and other candidates with 2.3% (45 votes), among the 2,005 ballots cast by the borough's 4,547 registered voters (44 ballots were spoiled), for a turnout of 44.1%. In the 2009 gubernatorial election, Republican Chris Christie received 55.2% of the vote (1,284 ballots cast), ahead of Democrat Jon Corzine with 34.3% (796 votes), Independent Chris Daggett with 8.0% (185 votes) and other candidates with 1.2% (29 votes), among the 2,324 ballots cast by the borough's 4,544 registered voters, yielding a 51.1% turnout.

United States Senate election results for Keyport1
Year	Republican		Democratic		Third party(ies)	
Year	No.	%	No.	%	No.	%
2024	1,820	51.21%	1,645	46.29%	89	2.50%
2018	1,263	49.12%	1,206	46.91%	102	3.97%
2012	1,335	47.29%	1,438	50.94%	50	1.77%
2006	1,036	46.77%	1,080	48.76%	99	4.47%

United States Senate election results for Keyport2
Year	Republican		Democratic		Third party(ies)	
Year	No.	%	No.	%	No.	%
2020	1,842	50.05%	1,755	47.69%	83	2.26%
2014	881	46.37%	976	51.37%	43	2.26%
2013	590	48.12%	617	50.33%	19	1.55%
2008	1,324	43.34%	1,633	53.45%	98	3.21%

== Education ==
The Keyport Public Schools serve students from pre-kindergarten through twelfth grade. As of the 2023–24 school year, the district, comprised of two schools, had an enrollment of 1,004 students and 100.0 classroom teachers (on an FTE basis), for a student–teacher ratio of 10.0:1. Schools in the district (with 2023-24 enrollment data from the National Center for Education Statistics) are Keyport Central School with 616 students in grades PreK–8 and Keyport High School with 375 students in grades 9–12.

Students in public school for ninth through twelfth grades from Union Beach attend the district's high school as part of a sending/receiving relationship with the Union Beach School System.

== Transportation ==
=== Roads and highways ===
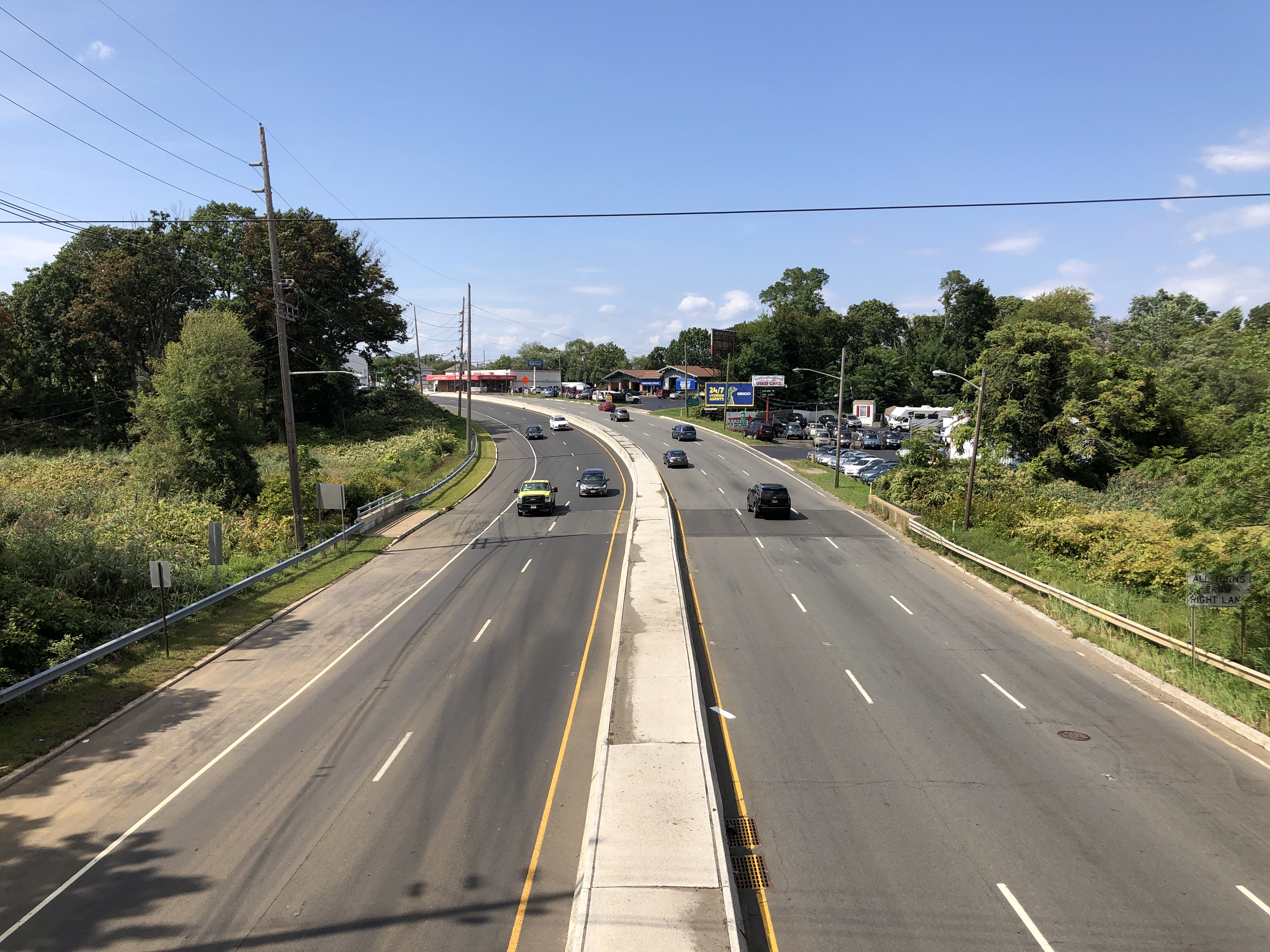
Route 35 north of Route 36 in Keyport

As of May 2010, the borough had a total of 25.51 miles (41.05 km) of roadways, of which 18.70 miles (30.09 km) were maintained by the municipality, 4.96 miles (7.98 km) by Monmouth County and 1.85 miles (2.98 km) by the New Jersey Department of Transportation.

Route 35 and Route 36 both pass through in the southern section. The Garden State Parkway is just outside in both neighboring Aberdeen and Hazlet townships at Exit 117.

=== Public transportation ===
NJ Transit offers local bus service on the 817 route.

NJ Transit train service is available nearby at the Hazlet and Aberdeen-Matawan stations. Commuter rail service is available on the North Jersey Coast Line.

== Notable people ==
People who were born in, residents of, or otherwise closely associated with Keyport include:

- Henry E. Ackerson Jr. (1880–1970), Justice of the New Jersey Supreme Court from 1948 to 1952
- Piotr Czech (born 1986), NFL placekicker
- John DeServio, bass player of Black Label Society
- John Earle (born 1968), retired football player who played in the CFL for the Baltimore Stallions before becoming a youth minister and evangelist
- Juanita Hall (1901–1968), actress best known for her role as "Bloody Mary" in the movie South Pacific
- Kenneth Hand (1899–1988), politician who served in the New Jersey Senate and judge on New Jersey Superior Court
- Garret Hobart (1844–1899), Vice President of the United States from 1897 to 1899, spent his boyhood years in Keyport at a home on Broad Street, which was destroyed in the Great Fire of September 21, 1877
- Moe Jaffe (1901–1972), songwriter and bandleader
- Pat Kennedy (born 1952), men's college basketball coach at a number of schools, most notably Florida State
- Amy Lamé (born 1971 as Amy Caddle), performer, writer, TV and radio presenter, known for her one-woman shows, her performance group Duckie, and LGBT-themed media works
- Sayra Fischer Lebenthal (1898–1994), Wall Street banker credited with introducing the idea of selling small lots of municipal bonds to individual investors
- Georg J. Lober (1892–1961), sculptor
- William Pope.L (1955–2023), visual artist best known for his work in performance art
- Theodore Ryder (1916–1993), one of the first twelve diabetes patients in the world to treated using insulin, at the age of five
- Horace M. Thorne (1918–1944), awarded the Medal of Honor for valor during World War II
- Raymond L. Wyckoff (1887–1939), politician, who served as Mayor of Keyport, member of the Monmouth County Board of Chosen Freeholders and as Monmouth County Clerk
