= Piotr Czech =

Polish gridiron football player (born 1986)

Profile
- Position: Placekicker

Personal information
- Born: August 17, 1986 (age 40); Oleśnica, Poland
- Listed height: 6 ft 5 in (1.96 m)
- Listed weight: 210 lb (95 kg)

Career information
- College: Wagner
- NFL draft: 2008: undrafted

Career history
- Baltimore Ravens (2008)*; Pittsburgh Steelers (2009)*; New York Sentinels (2009); Pittsburgh Steelers (2010)*; Iowa Barnstormers (2011)
- * Offseason or practice squad member only

Career AFL statistics
- Field goals made: 0
- Field goals attempted: 1
- Field goals %: 0
- Stats at ArenaFan.com

Piotr Czech (/ˈpiːtər ˈtʃɛk/ PEE-tər CHEK, Polish: [pjɔtr ˈt͡ʂɛx]; born August 17, 1986) is a Polish former American football placekicker. He was signed by the Baltimore Ravens as an undrafted free agent in 2008. He played college football at Wagner College.

Czech was raised in Keyport, New Jersey and played high school football at Keyport High School.

Czech was also a member of the Pittsburgh Steelers and New York Sentinels.
