= Theodore Ryder =

American diabetic

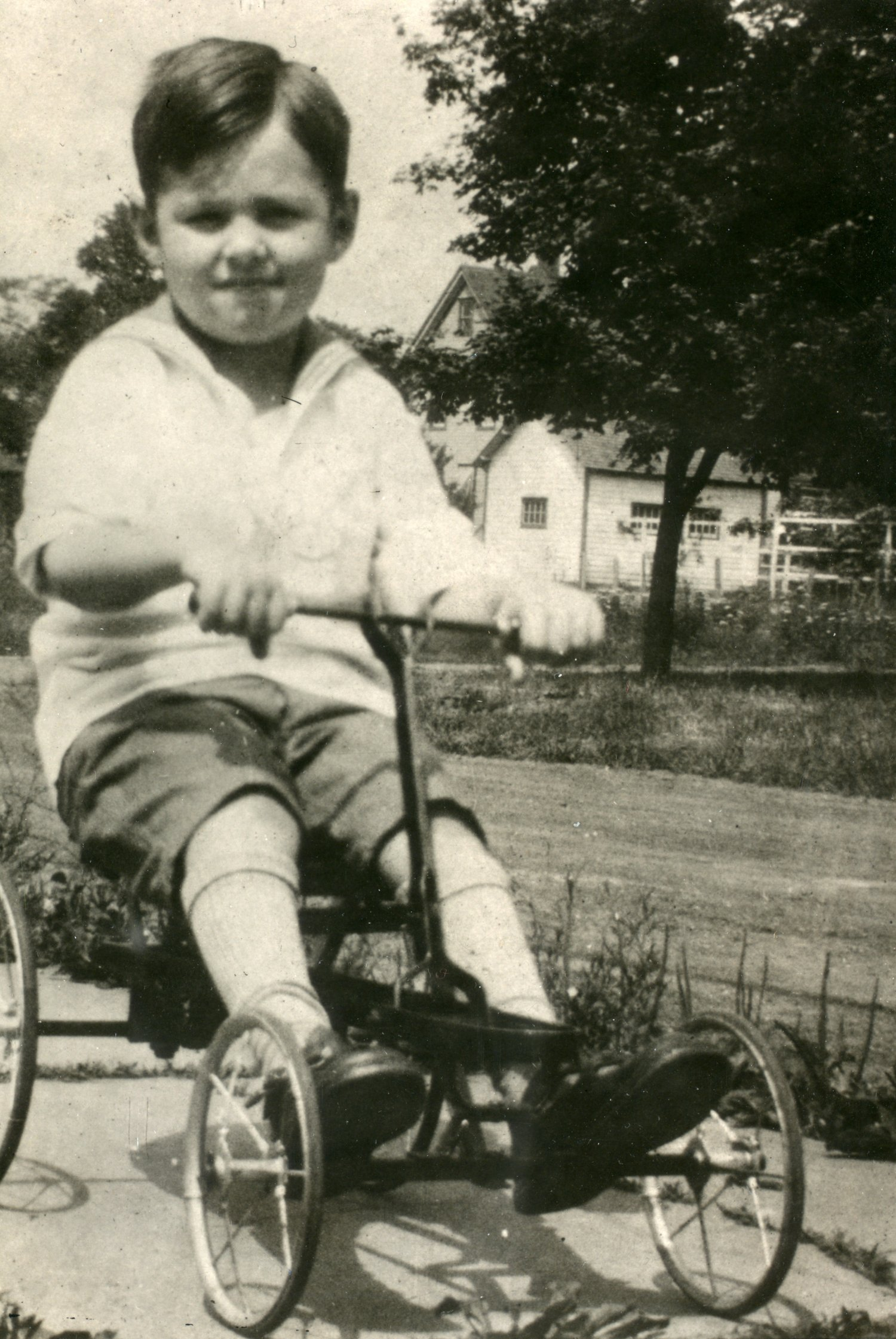
Ryder a year after treatment

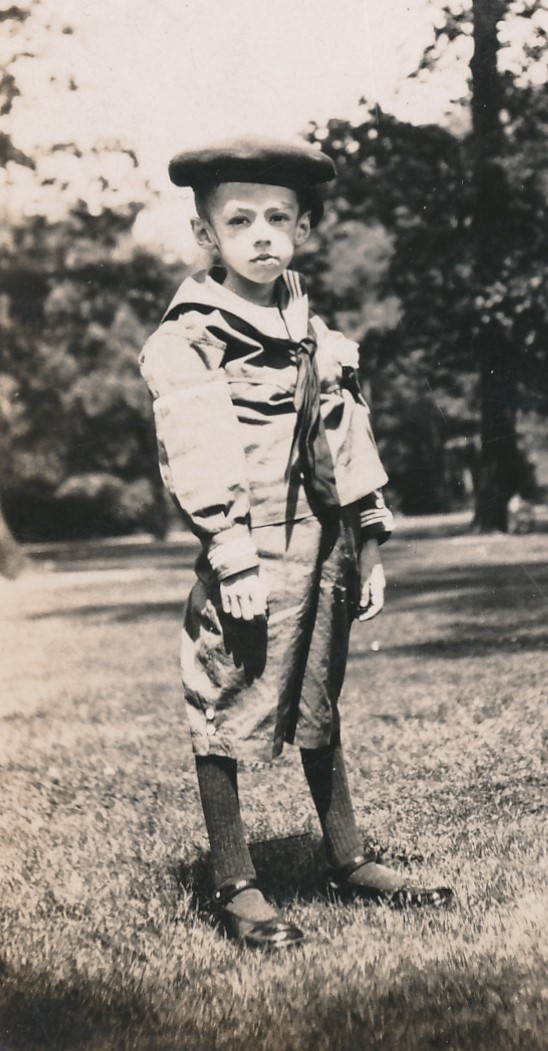
Ryder days before treatment

Theodore Ryder (September 14, 1916 – March 8, 1993), often called Ted or Teddy Ryder, was, at the age of five, one of the first twelve people with diabetes in the world to be treated using insulin. When he died in 1993 at the age of 76, he became the world's first person to live 70 years with diabetes and probably the longest documented case of sustained insulin treatment in medical history. He was also the last survivor of the first twelve diabetes patients treated with insulin.

== Life ==
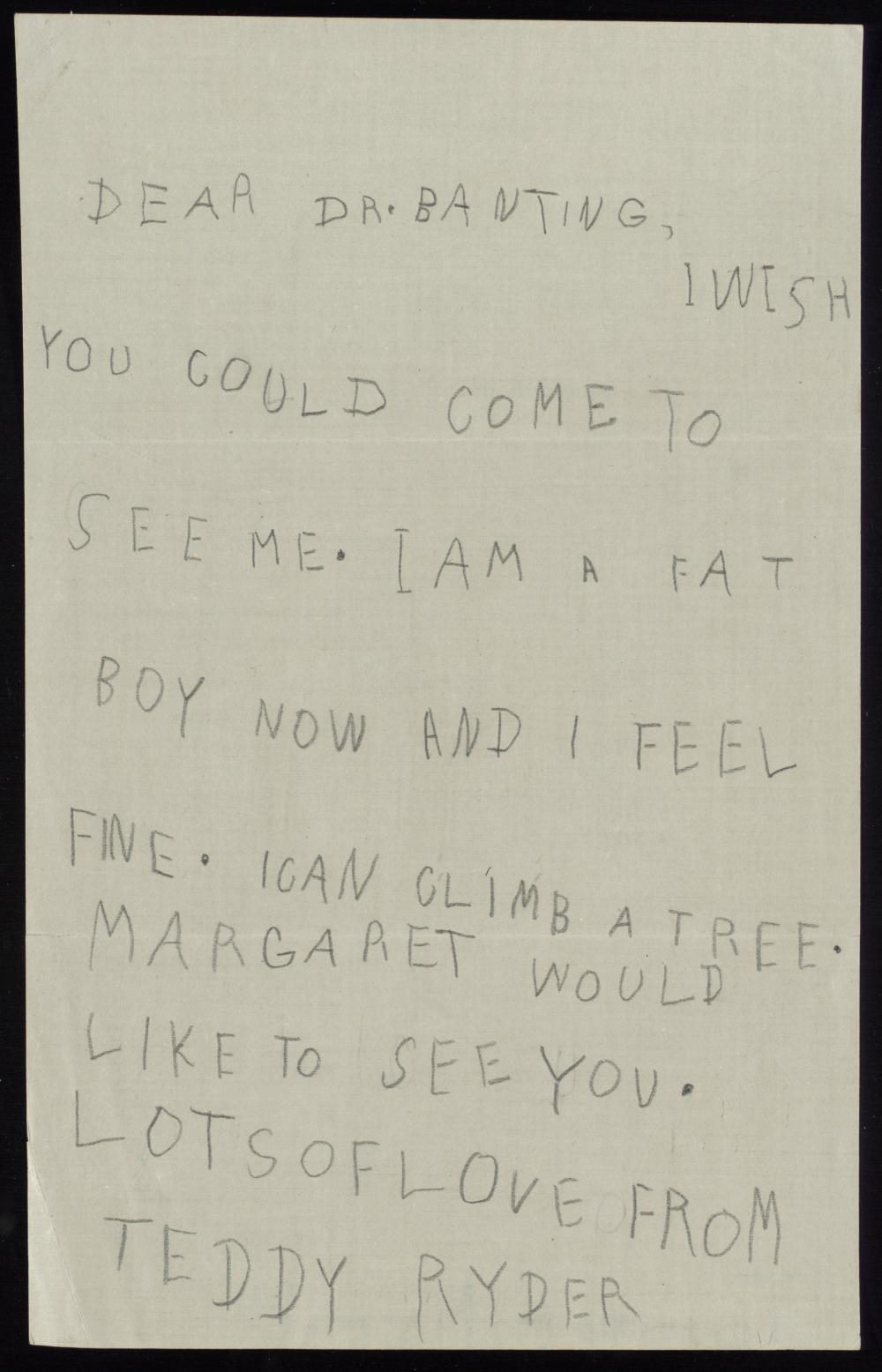
Letter to Banting

Theodore Ryder was born in Keyport, New Jersey, in 1916. At the age of four, he developed symptoms of diabetes mellitus, including greatly increased urine output, constant, intense thirst and significant weight loss. At that time, no therapy was available to treat diabetes, so the disease would have led to death within a short period of time. The only treatment option was a strict low-carbohydrate low-calorie diet of as little as 500 calories per day, which extended the lives of affected patients by about one to two years. In the spring of 1922, the physicians Frederick Banting and Charles Best at the University of Toronto succeeded in producing insulin purely from extracts of pancreatic tissue. After this became known to Theodore Ryder's family, an uncle who worked as a doctor in New York City attempted to have his nephew included in experiments to test insulin through a personal conversation with Banting. After initial hesitation, Banting gave in and began treating the boy on July 10, 1922, who at that time weighed only 12.5 kilograms at the age of five. Within a few months, Theodore Ryder made a full recovery and became a symbol for the staff treating him of the dramatic successes brought about by insulin. In October of the same year he was able to return home with his mother. In a letter of thanks to Banting he wrote:

Dear Dr. Banting, I wish you could come to see me. I am a fat boy now and I feel fine. I can climb a tree. Margaret would like to see you. Lots of love from Teddy Ryder

Theodore Ryder became a librarian in Hartford, Connecticut and lived a life without significant diabetes-related complications. He remained on friendly terms with Banting through regular correspondence until his death in 1941. Banting visited Theodore Ryder twice in the years following his treatment. The letters from Ryder to Banting are part of his estate and have been reproduced several times in medical history treatises on the medical history of diabetes. The collection of letters from Banting to Ryder has been in the holdings of the Thomas Fisher Library at the University of Toronto since 1999. In one of these letters, Banting wrote in December 1938, among other things:

I shall always follow your career with interest and you will forgive me if I add, a little pride, because I shall always remember the difficult times we had in the early days of insulin. The outstanding thing I remember was your strength and fortitude in observing your diet and the manly way in which you stood up to the punishment of hypodermic injections. I am sure that you will be a success in life if you maintain the same spirit in meeting the rebuffs of the world.

Theodore Ryder rose to prominence in the 1980s, as from this point onwards the length of time that he had lived with his illness and his state of health made him an exception even among long-term survivors of diabetes. The American Diabetes Society sells a coloring book for preschool children called “Teddy Ryder Rides Again” that aims to provide them with basic knowledge about the disease and its treatment.

== Literature ==
- Michael Bliss: Theodore Ryder: The Last Living Link to the Discovery of Insulin. In: Practical Diabetes International. 12(4)/1995. John Wiley & Sons, S. 187–188, ISSN 1357-8170
- Katharine Martyn: Teddy Ryder's Scrapbook. In: The Halcyon. The Newsletter of the Friends of the Thomas Fisher Library. Ausgabe 24, November 1999; online under Teddy Ryder's Scrapbook
