= Keyport Public Schools =

School district in Monmouth County, New Jersey, US

Address
- 335 Broad Street Keyport, Monmouth County, New Jersey, 07735; United States
- Coordinates: 40.429333°N 74.197669°W

District information
- Grades: PreK-12
- Superintendent: Lisa M. Savoia
- Business administrator: Anthony Rapolla
- Schools: 2

Students and staff
- Enrollment: 1,004 (as of 2023–24)
- Faculty: 100.0 FTEs
- Student–teacher ratio: 10.0:1

Other information
- District Factor Group: CD
- Website: District website
Ind.	Per pupil	District spending	Rank (*)	K-12 average	%± vs. average
1A	Total Spending	$18,213	27	$18,891	−3.6%
1	Budgetary Cost	14,859	32	14,783	0.5%
2	Classroom Instruction	8,917	36	8,763	1.8%
6	Support Services	2,086	30	2,392	−12.8%
8	Administrative Cost	1,653	24	1,485	11.3%
10	Operations & Maintenance	1,763	34	1,783	−1.1%
13	Extracurricular Activities	430	24	268	60.4%
16	Median Teacher Salary	58,167	21	64,043
Data from NJDoE 2014 Taxpayers' Guide to Education Spending. *Of K-12 districts with up to 1,800 students. Lowest spending=1; Highest=49

The Keyport Public Schools are a comprehensive community public school district that serves students in pre-kindergarten through twelfth grade from Keyport, in Monmouth County, in the U.S. state of New Jersey.

As of the 2023–24 school year, the district, comprised of two schools, had an enrollment of 1,004 students and 100.0 classroom teachers (on an FTE basis), for a student–teacher ratio of 10.0:1.

The district had been classified by the New Jersey Department of Education as being in District Factor Group "CD", the sixth-highest of eight groupings. District Factor Groups organize districts statewide to allow comparison by common socioeconomic characteristics of the local districts. From lowest socioeconomic status to highest, the categories are A, B, CD, DE, FG, GH, I and J.

Students in public school for ninth through twelfth grades from Union Beach attend the district's high school as part of a sending/receiving relationship with the Union Beach School System.

== Schools ==
Schools in the district (with 2023-24 enrollment data from the National Center for Education Statistics) are:

Elementary school

- Keyport Central School with 616 students in grades PreK–8
  - Kevin Flynn, Principal

High school

- Keyport High School with 375 students in grades 9–12
  - Michael P. Waters Sr., Principal

== Administration ==
Core members of the district's administration are:

- Lisa M. Savoia, superintendent
- Anthony Rapolla, business administrator and board secretary

== Board of education ==
The district's board of education, comprised of nine members, sets policy and oversees the fiscal and educational operation of the district through its administration. As a Type II school district, the board's trustees are elected directly by voters to serve three-year terms of office on a staggered basis, with three seats up for election each year held (since 2012) as part of the November general election. The board appoints a superintendent to oversee the district's day-to-day operations and a business administrator to supervise the business functions of the district. A tenth member is appointed by Union Beach to represent that district's interests on the Keyport board.
