= Union Beach, New Jersey =

Borough in Monmouth County, New Jersey, US

- Borough
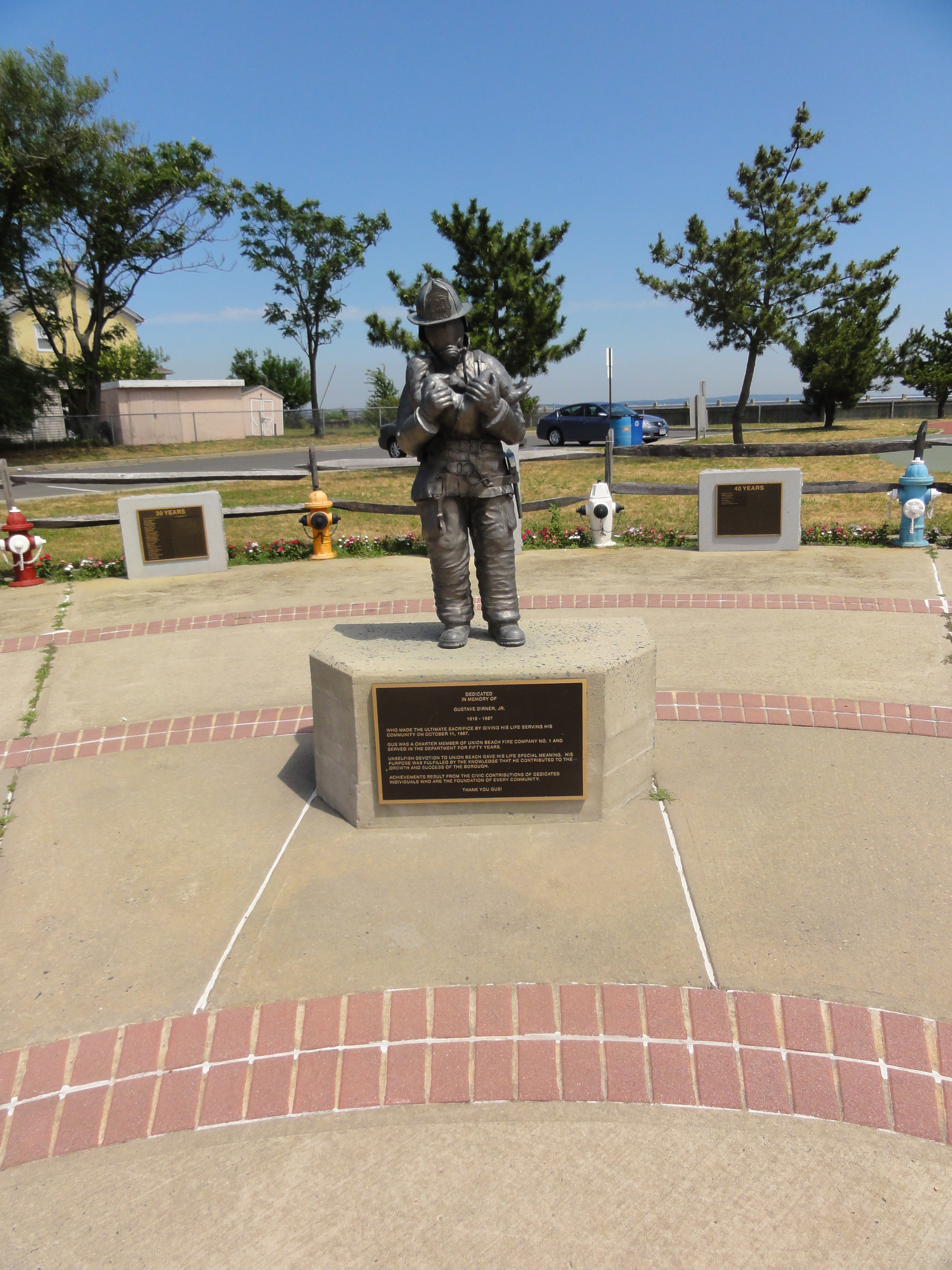
- Fireman Memorial in Union Beach

- Seal

- Location of Union Beach in Monmouth County highlighted in red (left). Inset map: Location of Monmouth County in New Jersey highlighted in orange (right).

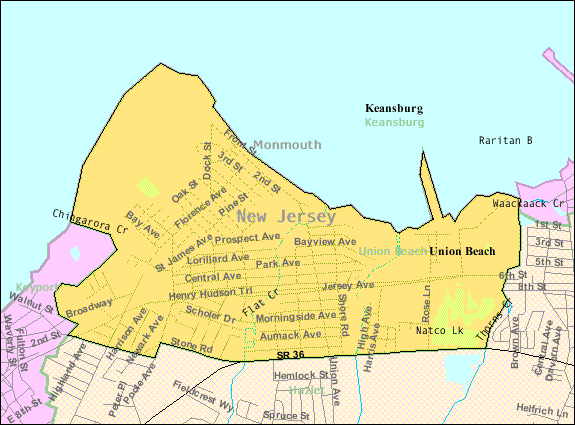
- Census Bureau map of Union Beach, New Jersey

- Location in Monmouth County Location in New Jersey Location in the United States
- Coordinates: 40.44749°N 74.170046°W
- Country: United States
- State: New Jersey
- County: Monmouth
- Incorporated: April 16, 1925

Government
  - Type: Borough
  - Body: Borough Council
  - Mayor: Charles W. Cocuzza (R, term ends December 31, 2027)
  - Administrator: Robert M. Howard Jr.
  - Municipal clerk: Alexandra Sweeney (acting)

Area
  - Total: 1.88 sq mi (4.87 km^{2})
  - Land: 1.78 sq mi (4.61 km^{2})
  - Water: 0.10 sq mi (0.26 km^{2}) 5.32%
  - Rank: 421st of 565 in state 33rd of 53 in county
- Elevation: 3 ft (0.91 m)

Population (2020)
  - Total: 5,723
  - Estimate (2023): 5,671
  - Rank: 359th of 565 in state 31st of 53 in county
  - Density: 3,211.6/sq mi (1,240.0/km^{2})
  - Rank: 208th of 565 in state 23rd of 53 in county
- Time zone: UTC−05:00 (Eastern (EST))
  - Summer (DST): UTC−04:00 (Eastern (EDT))
- ZIP Code: 07735
- Area code: 732
- FIPS code: 3402574540
- GNIS feature ID: 0885423
- Website: www.unionbeachnj.gov

Union Beach is a borough on Raritan Bay and the northern Jersey Shore in Monmouth County, in the U.S. state of New Jersey. The borough is a small coastal bedroom suburb of New York City in the New York metropolitan area, with views of Manhattan visible in the distance from the bayfront beach. As of the 2020 United States census, the borough's population was 5,723, a decrease of 522 (−8.4%) from the 2010 census count of 6,245, which in turn reflected a decline of 404 (−6.1%) from the 6,649 counted in the 2000 census.

Union Beach was formed as a borough by an act of the New Jersey Legislature on March 16, 1925, from portions of Raritan Township (now Hazlet), based on the results of a referendum held on April 16, 1925. A 100-acre (40 ha) farm in the future borough was owned by the Poole family since the days of the American Revolutionary War. Following the development of the Central Railroad of New Jersey, the Poole Farm became the site of the Union Subdivision in 1908, while an area that had been called East Point Beach Estates was renamed Union Beach by developer Charles Carr in 1920.

Union Beach was part of the Bayshore Regional Strategic Plan, an effort by nine municipalities in northern Monmouth County to reinvigorate the area's economy by emphasizing the traditional downtowns, dense residential neighborhoods, maritime history, and the natural beauty of the Raritan Bayshore coastline. The plan has since been integrated into the county's 2016 master plan.

== Geography ==
Union Beach is 16.1 miles from Staten Island's Outerbridge. According to the United States Census Bureau, the borough had a total area of 1.88 square miles (4.87 km^{2}), including 1.78 square miles (4.61 km^{2}) of land and 0.10 square miles (0.26 km^{2}) of water (5.32%).

Union Beach has undergone extensive restoration of its beach front, which offers a view of the New York City skyline and the Verrazano Bridge.

This restoration has occurred in phases and was performed by U.S. Army Corps of Engineers, New York District.

A monument to the victims of the September 11 terrorist attacks, constructed of black stone and dedicated in June 2002, is positioned to allow visitors to see past the memorial towards the location where the World Trade Center towers were visible from the borough.

Unincorporated communities, localities and place names within the borough include Lorrillard Beach, Natco, Union Gardens and Van Marters Corner.

The borough borders the Monmouth County municipalities of Hazlet, Keansburg (maritime border) and Keyport.

== History ==
=== Hurricane Sandy ===
On October 28, 2012, at 4:00pm, the mayor issued a mandatory evacuation for the borough in preparation for Hurricane Sandy—the second-costliest hurricane in United States history. When the hurricane arrived, approximately one third of the borough's 6,200 residents had left.

External videos
- Hurricane Sandy Storm Footage (Union Beach, New Jersey)

By the morning of October 29, of the estimated 2,143 households in the borough, approximately 200 homes and businesses were damaged, 400 took on more than 6 feet (1.8 m) of water, and 62 were "completely missing". An additional 100 that had shifted off foundations and were no longer habitable. The borough's police department borrowed several police cruisers from other municipalities such as Wilmington, NC and Clay County, Florida. Most cars were destroyed when flooding reached police headquarters. Former residents from around the country mobilized and organized relief efforts: sending relief supplies; including advising and assisting public servants in acquiring replacements of lost emergency vehicles. In total, the borough lost 14 police cars, three ambulances and four fire trucks. Madison Township and Wanaque each gave repurposed police cruisers fully decaled with Union Beach logos, as well as other relief. Some local agencies sold old police cruisers for one dollar each or donated police cars, and donations of two cars each came from North Carolina and Florida. EMS and fire trucks were also donated from near and far.

Jakeabob's Bay, a restaurant and waterfront tiki bar and one of the major employers in town, which survived Hurricane Irene in 2011, was destroyed in the hurricane. The storm surge completely washed through the building, pushing out tables, chairs, menus and displays. The restaurant owner, Gigi Liaguno-Dorr, organized the relief and rebuilding efforts for Union Beach. The building was razed when the insurance companies that covered the restaurant would not pay out. A new temporary restaurant was built but did not manage to renew its lease due to insurance disputes with the Federal Emergency Management Agency.

Union Beach Memorial School, the borough's only school, was inundated with floodwaters and debris when the storm surge and extreme high tide swept through the borough. The school had been used as an evacuation center but began taking on water as the storm raged. Hundreds of library books and teaching materials were destroyed along with thousands of dollars' worth of instruments. After several months of emergency repairs by volunteers, including students and teachers, the renovations including new floors, walls, desks and murals were finished prior to the end of the school year.

== Demographics ==
Historical population
Census	Pop.	Note	%±
1930	1,893		—
1940	2,076		9.7%
1950	3,636		75.1%
1960	5,862		61.2%
1970	6,472		10.4%
1980	6,354		−1.8%
1990	6,156		−3.1%
2000	6,649		8.0%
2010	6,245		−6.1%
2020	5,723		−8.4%
2023 (est.)	5,671	▼	−0.9%
Population sources:1930 1940–2000; 2000 2010 2020

=== 2020 census ===
As of the 2020 census, Union Beach had a population of 5,723. The median age was 40.9 years. 20.2% of residents were under the age of 18 and 12.8% of residents were 65 years of age or older. For every 100 females there were 96.3 males, and for every 100 females age 18 and over there were 95.5 males age 18 and over.

100.0% of residents lived in urban areas, while 0.0% lived in rural areas.

There were 2,036 households in Union Beach, of which 33.0% had children under the age of 18 living in them. Of all households, 53.5% were married-couple households, 14.8% were households with a male householder and no spouse or partner present, and 22.1% were households with a female householder and no spouse or partner present. About 18.6% of all households were made up of individuals and 7.1% had someone living alone who was 65 years of age or older.

There were 2,183 housing units, of which 6.7% were vacant. The homeowner vacancy rate was 3.0% and the rental vacancy rate was 5.8%.

Racial composition as of the 2020 census
Race	Number	Percent
White	4,724	82.5%
Black or African American	123	2.1%
American Indian and Alaska Native	10	0.2%
Asian	125	2.2%
Native Hawaiian and Other Pacific Islander	0	0.0%
Some other race	231	4.0%
Two or more races	510	8.9%
Hispanic or Latino (of any race)	726	12.7%

=== 2010 census ===
The 2010 United States census counted 6,245 people, 2,143 households, and 1,624 families in the borough. The population density was 3,461.5 per square mile (1,336.5/km^{2}). There were 2,269 housing units at an average density of 1,257.7 per square mile (485.6/km^{2}). The racial makeup was 91.05% (5,686) White, 1.54% (96) Black or African American, 0.16% (10) Native American, 1.81% (113) Asian, 0.00% (0) Pacific Islander, 3.09% (193) from other races, and 2.35% (147) from two or more races. Hispanic or Latino of any race were 10.98% (686) of the population.

Of the 2,143 households, 34.5% had children under the age of 18; 56.0% were married couples living together; 12.8% had a female householder with no husband present and 24.2% were non-families. Of all households, 18.7% were made up of individuals and 5.6% had someone living alone who was 65 years of age or older. The average household size was 2.91 and the average family size was 3.32.

24.0% of the population were under the age of 18, 8.9% from 18 to 24, 27.1% from 25 to 44, 30.8% from 45 to 64, and 9.3% who were 65 years of age or older. The median age was 38.6 years. For every 100 females, the population had 98.4 males. For every 100 females ages 18 and older there were 96.3 males.

The Census Bureau's 2006–2010 American Community Survey showed that (in 2010 inflation-adjusted dollars) median household income was $61,347 (with a margin of error of +/− $10,084) and the median family income was $76,744 (+/− $15,912). Males had a median income of $55,000 (+/− $5,759) versus $36,002 (+/− $3,887) for females. The per capita income for the borough was $24,982 (+/− $1,875). About 3.1% of families and 4.9% of the population were below the poverty line, including 3.4% of those under age 18 and 4.0% of those age 65 or over.

=== 2000 census ===
As of the 2000 United States census there were 6,649 people, 2,143 households, and 1,722 families residing in the borough. The population density was 3,545.1 inhabitants per square mile (1,368.8/km^{2}). There were 2,229 housing units at an average density of 1,188.5 per square mile (458.9/km^{2}). The racial makeup of the borough was 94.45% White, 0.87% African American, 0.20% Native American, 1.23% Asian, 1.35% from other races, and 1.90% from two or more races. Hispanic or Latino of any race were 8.09% of the population.

There were 2,143 households, out of which 43.3% had children under the age of 18 living with them, 62.7% were married couples living together, 12.2% had a female householder with no husband present, and 19.6% were non-families. 15.5% of all households were made up of individuals, and 5.5% had someone living alone who was 65 years of age or older. The average household size was 3.09 and the average family size was 3.44.

In the borough the population was spread out, with 29.1% under the age of 18, 8.3% from 18 to 24, 33.0% from 25 to 44, 22.1% from 45 to 64, and 7.5% who were 65 years of age or older. The median age was 34 years. For every 100 females, there were 102.0 males. For every 100 females age 18 and over, there were 97.9 males.

=== Income and poverty ===
In 2022, the median household income of the 1.99k households in Union Beach grew to $124,828 from the previous year's value of $114,028.

== Government ==
=== Local government ===
Union Beach is governed under the borough form of New Jersey municipal government, which is used in 218 municipalities (of the 564) statewide, making it the most common form of government in New Jersey. The governing body is comprised of a mayor and a borough council, with all positions elected at-large on a partisan basis as part of the November general election. A mayor is elected directly by the voters to a four-year term of office. The borough council includes six members elected to serve three-year terms on a staggered basis, with two seats coming up for election each year in a three-year cycle. The borough form of government used by Union Beach is a "weak mayor / strong council" government in which council members act as the legislative body with the mayor presiding at meetings and voting only in the event of a tie. The mayor can veto ordinances subject to an override by a two-thirds majority vote of the council. The mayor makes committee and liaison assignments for council members, and most appointments are made by the mayor with the advice and consent of the council.

As of 2025, the mayor of Union Beach is Republican Charles W. Cocuzza, who was elected to serve a term of office ending December 31, 2027. Members of the Borough Council are Council President Albin J. Wicki (R, 2027), Louis S. Andreuzzi Sr. (R, 2026), Albert E. Lewandowski (R, 2025), Louis Riccardi (R, 2025), Cherlanne Roche (R, 2026) and Eileen Woodruff (R, 2027).

In May 2020, the borough council appointed Albin J. Wicki to fill the seat expiring in December 2023 that had been held by Paul J. Smith Jr. until his death the previous month. In the November 2020 general election, Charles W. Cocuzza was elected to serve the balance of the term of office.

=== Federal, state and county representation ===
Union Beach is located in the 6th Congressional District and is part of New Jersey's 13th state legislative district.

For the 119th United States Congress, New Jersey's 6th congressional district is represented by Frank Pallone (D, Long Branch). New Jersey is represented in the United States Senate by Democrats Cory Booker (Newark, term ends 2027) and Andy Kim (Moorestown, term ends 2031).

For the 2026–2027 session, the 13th legislative district of the New Jersey Legislature is represented in the New Jersey Senate by Declan O'Scanlon (R, Little Silver) and in the General Assembly by Vicky Flynn (R, Holmdel Township) and Gerard Scharfenberger (R, Middletown Township).

Monmouth County is governed by a Board of County Commissioners composed of five members who are elected at-large to serve three-year terms of office on a staggered basis, with either one or two seats up for election each year as part of the November general election. At an annual reorganization meeting held in the beginning of January, the board selects one of its members to serve as director and another as deputy director.

As of 2025, Monmouth County's Commissioners are Director Thomas A. Arnone (R, Neptune City, 2025), Susan M. Kiley (R, Hazlet Township, 2027), Erik Anderson (R, Shrewsbury, 2026), Nick DiRocco (R, Wall Township, 2025), and Deputy Director Ross F. Licitra (R, Marlboro Township, 2026).

Constitutional officers elected on a countywide basis are Clerk Christine Giordano Hanlon (R, 2025; Ocean Township), Sheriff Shaun Golden (R, 2025; Howell Township) and Surrogate Rosemarie D. Peters (R, 2026; Middletown Township).

=== Politics ===
United States presidential election results for Union Beach
Year	Republican		Democratic		Third party(ies)	
Year	No.	%	No.	%	No.	%
2024	2,060	64.21%	1,102	34.35%	46	1.43%
2020	1,976	61.01%	1,214	37.48%	49	1.51%
2016	1,573	60.99%	892	34.59%	114	4.42%
2012	976	45.74%	1,109	51.97%	49	2.30%
2008	1,490	53.99%	1,229	44.53%	41	1.49%
2004	1,569	56.48%	1,172	42.19%	37	1.33%
2000	951	40.55%	1,285	54.80%	109	4.65%
1996	674	29.88%	1,196	53.01%	386	17.11%
1992	1,051	40.96%	907	35.35%	608	23.69%

As of March 2011, there were a total of 3,782 registered voters in Union Beach, of which 887 (23.5%) were registered as Democrats, 667 (17.6%) were registered as Republicans and 2,228 (58.9%) were registered as Unaffiliated. There were no voters registered to other parties.

Gubernatorial election results for Union Beach
Year	Republican		Democratic		Third party(ies)	
Year	No.	%	No.	%	No.	%
2025	1,521	60.84%	971	38.84%	8	0.32%
2021	1,444	69.16%	629	30.12%	15	0.72%
2017	975	61.63%	571	36.09%	36	2.28%
2013	1,099	73.61%	362	24.25%	32	2.14%
2009	1,152	65.45%	442	25.11%	166	9.43%
2005	855	51.48%	689	41.48%	117	7.04%

In the 2012 presidential election, Democrat Barack Obama received 52.6% of the vote (1,109 cast), ahead of Republican Mitt Romney with 46.3% (976 votes), and other candidates with 1.0% (22 votes), among the 2,119 ballots cast by the borough's 3,857 registered voters (12 ballots were spoiled), for a turnout of 54.9%. In the 2008 presidential election, Republican John McCain received 53.2% of the vote (1,490 cast), ahead of Democrat Barack Obama with 43.9% (1,229 votes) and other candidates with 1.5% (41 votes), among the 2,802 ballots cast by the borough's 4,103 registered voters, for a turnout of 68.3%. In the 2004 presidential election, Republican George W. Bush received 56.2% of the vote (1,569 ballots cast), outpolling Democrat John Kerry with 42.0% (1,172 votes) and other candidates with 0.9% (37 votes), among the 2,793 ballots cast by the borough's 4,114 registered voters, for a turnout percentage of 67.9.

In the 2013 gubernatorial election, Republican Chris Christie received 73.6% of the vote (1,099 cast), ahead of Democrat Barbara Buono with 24.2% (362 votes), and other candidates with 2.1% (32 votes), among the 1,520 ballots cast by the borough's 3,642 registered voters (27 ballots were spoiled), for a turnout of 41.7%. In the 2009 gubernatorial election, Republican Chris Christie received 65.5% of the vote (1,152 ballots cast), ahead of Democrat Jon Corzine with 24.6% (432 votes), Independent Chris Daggett with 7.7% (136 votes) and other candidates with 1.7% (30 votes), among the 1,759 ballots cast by the borough's 3,917 registered voters, yielding a 44.9% turnout.

United States Senate election results for Union Beach1
Year	Republican		Democratic		Third party(ies)	
Year	No.	%	No.	%	No.	%
2024	1,863	61.73%	1,074	35.59%	81	2.68%
2018	1,218	59.65%	741	36.29%	83	4.06%
2012	1,045	53.10%	884	44.92%	39	1.98%
2006	795	52.48%	649	42.84%	71	4.69%

United States Senate election results for Union Beach2
Year	Republican		Democratic		Third party(ies)	
Year	No.	%	No.	%	No.	%
2020	1,842	58.13%	1,253	39.54%	74	2.34%
2014	689	52.92%	582	44.70%	31	2.38%
2013	423	60.43%	263	37.57%	14	2.00%
2008	1,265	50.64%	1,145	45.84%	88	3.52%

== Education ==
The Union Beach School System serves public school students in pre-kindergarten through eighth grade at Union Beach Memorial School. As of the 2019–20 school year, the district, comprised of one school, had an enrollment of 640 students and 61.7 classroom teachers (on an FTE basis), for a student–teacher ratio of 10.4:1.

Public school students in ninth through twelfth grades attend Keyport High School in Keyport, as part of a sending/receiving relationship with the Keyport Public Schools. As of the 2019–20 school year, the high school had an enrollment of 373 students and 36.5 classroom teachers (on an FTE basis), for a student–teacher ratio of 10.2:1.

Students have the choice to apply for Red Bank Regional High School for admission into its specialized programs. High school students also have the option to apply to one of the career academies in the Monmouth County Vocational School District.

== Transportation ==
=== Roads and highways ===
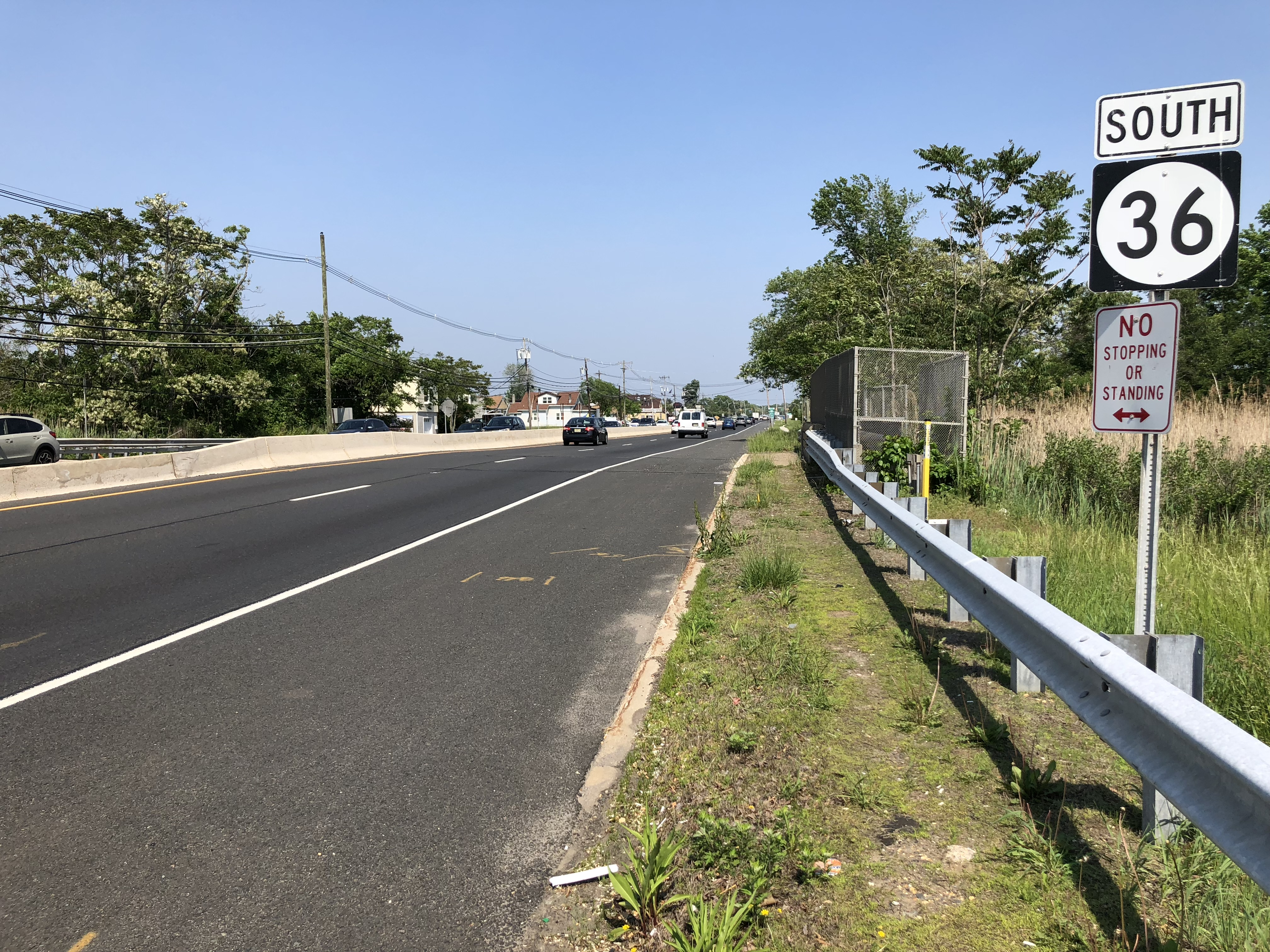
Route 36 on the edge of Union Beach

As of May 2010, the borough had a total of 25.60 miles (41.20 km) of roadways, of which 22.06 miles (35.50 km) were maintained by the municipality, 2.93 miles (4.72 km) by Monmouth County and 0.61 miles (0.98 km) by the New Jersey Department of Transportation.

Route 36 runs along the borough's southern border with Hazlet Township.

=== Public transportation ===
NJ Transit local bus service is available on the 817 route to Perth Amboy. Academy Bus Lines provides service to the Port Authority Bus Terminal in Midtown Manhattan and to Wall Street in Downtown Manhattan on routes along Route 36. The closest train station is in neighboring Hazlet, which provides service on the North Jersey Coast Line.

Union Beach is 29 miles (47 km) from Newark Liberty International Airport in Newark / Elizabeth.

Boating

The distance by water from Staten Island to Union Beach is approximately 2 to 3 nautical miles (3.7 to 5.6 km; 2.3 to 3.5 mi), depending on the specific starting and ending points you consider within Staten Island and Union Beach, respectively. The water route generally follows the Raritan Bay, which separates Staten Island from the New Jersey shoreline.

== Controversy ==
Union Beach made national news for its opposition to a wind turbine proposed by the Bayshore Regional Sewerage Authority that would be constructed in close proximity to residential houses, sensitive bird habitats, and protected wetlands. The agency received approval in October 2009 from the New Jersey Department of Environmental Protection for the turbine, which would stand 380 feet (120 m) high. The case was brought to the Supreme Court of New Jersey, which in September 2014 upheld a state law disallowing local ordinances from preventing the development of certain wind power projects in New Jersey.

== Notable people ==
People who were born in, residents of, or otherwise closely associated with Union Beach include:

- Paul Bacon (born 1923), designer of book and album covers
- Skip O'Brien (1950–2011), actor who had a recurring role on CSI: Crime Scene Investigation

== In popular culture ==
Union Beach was used as the eighth checkpoint of the titular race in the seventh part of the popular manga series, Jojo's Bizarre Adventure.

Portions of the 2024 film Space Cadet, starring Emma Roberts, were filmed in the borough, including scenes where Union Beach was used to represent Cocoa Beach, Florida.

Preceded by Cliffwood Beach	Beaches of New Jersey	Succeeded by Keansburg
