= Union Beach School System =

School district in Monmouth County, New Jersey, US

Address
- 1207 Florence Avenue Union Beach, Monmouth County, New Jersey, 07735; United States
- Coordinates: 40.44586°N 74.179198°W

District information
- Grades: PreK-8
- Superintendent: Amanda Lewert
- Business administrator: George Gahles
- Schools: 1

Students and staff
- Enrollment: 614 (as of 2023–24)
- Faculty: 52.8 FTEs
- Student–teacher ratio: 11.63:1

Other information
- District Factor Group: CD
- Website: www.unionbeachschools.org
Ind.	Per pupil	District spending	Rank (*)	K-8 average	%± vs. average
1A	Total Spending	$17,214	21	$18,891	−8.9%
1	Budgetary Cost	13,367	20	14,159	−5.6%
2	Classroom Instruction	8,003	21	8,659	−7.6%
6	Support Services	2,107	27	2,167	−2.8%
8	Administrative Cost	1,326	7	1,547	−14.3%
10	Operations & Maintenance	1,733	43	1,612	7.5%
13	Extracurricular Activities	99	24	104	−4.8%
16	Median Teacher Salary	53,353	9	61,136
Data from NJDoE 2014 Taxpayers' Guide to Education Spending. *Of K-8 districts with 401-750 students. Lowest spending=1; Highest=64

The Union Beach School System is a community public school district that serves students in pre-kindergarten through eighth grade from Union Beach, in Monmouth County, in the U.S. state of New Jersey.

As of the 2023–24 school year, the district, comprised of one school, had an enrollment of 614 students and 52.8 classroom teachers (on an FTE basis), for a student–teacher ratio of 11.63:1.

The district is classified by the New Jersey Department of Education as being in District Factor Group "CD", the sixth-highest of eight groupings. District Factor Groups organize districts statewide to allow comparison by common socioeconomic characteristics of the local districts. From lowest socioeconomic status to highest, the categories are A, B, CD, DE, FG, GH, I and J.

Public school students in ninth through twelfth grades attend Keyport High School in Keyport, as part of a sending/receiving relationship with the Keyport Public Schools. As of the 2019–20 school year, the high school had an enrollment of 373 students and 36.5 classroom teachers (on an FTE basis), for a student–teacher ratio of 10.2:1. Students have the choice, as well, to apply for Red Bank Regional High School for admission into its specialized programs.

== School ==
Union Beach Memorial School had an enrollment of 606 students in grades PreK–8 as of the 2023–24 school year.

- Kelly Savicky, principal

== Administration ==
Core members of the district's administration are:

- Amanda Lewart, superintendent
- George Gahles, business administrator and board secretary

== Board of education ==
The district's board of education is composed of nine members who set policy and oversee the fiscal and educational operation of the district through its administration. As a Type II school district, the board's trustees are elected directly by voters to serve three-year terms of office on a staggered basis, with three seats up for election each year held (since 2012) as part of the November general election. The board appoints a superintendent to oversee the district's day-to-day operations and a business administrator to supervise the business functions of the district.
