= John Earle (American football) =

American football player (born 1968)

Profile
- Position: Guard

Personal information
- Born: April 1, 1968 (age 58); Keyport, New Jersey, U.S.
- Listed height: 6 ft 5 in (1.96 m)
- Listed weight: 250 lb (113 kg)

Career information
- College: Western Illinois
- NFL draft: 1992: 11th round, 283rd overall pick

Career history
- Cincinnati Bengals (1992)*; Kansas City Chiefs (1992–1993)*; New England Patriots (1993)*; Atlanta Falcons (1994)*; Baltimore Stallions (1995); St. Louis Rams (1996)*
- * Offseason or practice squad member only

Awards and highlights
- Grey Cup champion (1995)

John Earle (born April 1, 1968) is an American former professional football player who was a guard for two seasons with the Baltimore Stallions of the Canadian Football League (CFL). He played college football for the Western Illinois Leathernecks and was selected in the 11th round of the 1992 NFL draft by the Cincinnati Bengals.

Raised in Keyport, New Jersey, Earle graduated from Keyport High School in 1987.

== Life after football ==
In 1997, Earle turned down a contract to go to the Washington Redskins. After playing five years of professional football, Earle began working with youth with "Team Impact" and Sportsworld. As a member of Sportsworld, Earle speaks in high schools all around the country. Earle also serves as an assistant football coach of the West Prairie/LaHarpe Cyclones.

In 2008, Earle moved to Gainesville, Texas, to become a local student minister at the First Baptist Church.

On December 1, 2010, Earle began working as a youth minister in Colleyville, Texas at First Baptist Church Colleyville.
