= Moe Jaffe =

American songwriter and bandleader

Moe Jaffe (October 23, 1901 – December 2, 1972) was an American songwriter and bandleader who composed more than 250 songs. He is best known for six: "Collegiate", "The Gypsy in My Soul", "If I Had My Life to Live Over", "If You Are But a Dream", "Bell Bottom Trousers", and "I'm My Own Grandpa".

His first success, Collegiate, is considered a "quintessential flapper song". Premiering in 1925, it was a theme for Harpo Marx as the Professor in Animal Crackers; played by Chico Marx in the movie Horse Feathers; and covered by Fred Waring and His Pennsylvanians.

== Early life and education ==
Jaffe was born into a Jewish family in Vilna in the Russian Empire (now Vilnius, Lithuania). Shortly after his birth, the family emigrated to America and settled in Keyport, New Jersey.

After graduating from Keyport High School, Jaffe worked his way through the University of Pennsylvania's Wharton School (class of 1923) and the University of Pennsylvania Law School (class of 1926) by playing piano and leading a campus dance band, Jaffe's Collegians.

== Career ==
It was the band's theme song, "Collegiate", that turned him toward Tin Pan Alley.

=== First success: "Collegiate" ===
Written by Jaffe and fellow student Nat Bonx, "Collegiate" was well known on the campus when Fred Waring (a Pennsylvania State grad) brought his "Pennsylvanians" to play at the university's annual Ivy Ball. Waring received so many requests for the song that he assumed it was published. When he learned that the writers were students, he arranged to meet them.

On April 4, 1925, Waring recorded "Collegiate" at the Victor Talking Machine Company studios in Camden, New Jersey. It was one of the first electrical recordings of a song, using an electrical microphone instead of an acoustic horn. Lee Morse recorded his song "Bolshevik".

On August 18, 1925, the song achieved notoriety when interpolated with the Gay Paree musical revue which opened in the Shubert Theatre in New York.

Waring's recording helped make "Collegiate" number three in the country, selling more than one million copies of sheet music. To date, the song has sold over five million discs and was "interpolated" into several movies.

In the 1930 Marx Brothers film Animal Crackers, "Collegiate" was the theme for Harpo Marx's professor character.

In 1932, Marx Brothers film Horse Feathers included a scene wherein Baravelli (played by Chico Marx) plays a piano version of the theme accompanied by an offscreen orchestra during a feigned voice lesson for the protagonists' love interest.

=== On Broadway ===
From the late 1920s through the mid '40s, Jaffe's songwriting made Jaffe and his orchestra a Philadelphia favorite. Their music was broadcast live from the Georgian Room of the Benjamin Franklin Hotel. For many summers, he also took his band to Poland Spring, Maine, where they were the house orchestra at the Poland Spring House.

Jaffe continued his songwriting, primarily as a lyricist, though he wrote the music for some songs. In 1927, a Shubert Brothers production, "Listen, Dearie", had included the song "Sweetest Little Girl" by Jaffe, Nat Bonx, and Clay Boland. Jaffe contributed songs to three revues produced by the Messrs. Shubert: "Pleasure Bound", "A Night in Venice," and "Broadway Nights."

One of his most successful songs, "The Gypsy in My Soul", was written with Clay Boland in 1937 for the 50th annual production of the University of Pennsylvania's Mask and Wig Show. These "varsity shows" were major productions at the time, playing in theaters and drawing audiences from outside the university community. The songs were printed in a portfolio and sold as souvenirs. In 1935, Brooks Bowman wrote "East of the Sun" for a Princeton Triangle show and copyrighted it. After that, contributing songwriters secured independent publication of their songs, which were published in individual copies, orchestrated for dance, and recorded by name artists.

Lyricist Moe Jaffe teamed with Clay Boland to write the scores for nine Mask & Wig shows between 1936 and 1950. One of their first collaborations, "An Apple a Day" (from the 1936 Mask & Wig show "This Mad Whirl"), was recorded by Hal Kemp for Brunswick, by Tempo King for Bluebird, and by Ruby Newman for Victor; Benny Goodman never recorded "An Apple a Day" commercially, but his orchestra did play it on radio broadcasts. "The Gypsy in My Soul" has been recorded at least 100 times since then, it was wise for Jaffe and Boland to retain the rights.

== Later hits ==
Although "book shows" like the Mask & Wig productions provide songwriters with a context, most of Jaffe's subsequent songs, written with various collaborators, were created independently of the stage. In 1937, for example, Jaffe teamed up with Henry Tobias and Larry Vincent to write "If I Had My Life to Live Over", a sentimental waltz that caught on after World War II, when it was featured by Kate Smith, Buddy Clark and Bob Eberly, among others.

In 1941, Jaffe, Nat Bonx and musician Jack Fulton adapted Anton Rubinstein's classical "Romance", added lyrics, and called their version "If You Are But a Dream". After Jimmy Dorsey and his Orchestra introduced the song (with Bob Eberly's vocal), it went on to take a permanent place among Frank Sinatra's greatest hits—recorded on Columbia with Axel Stordahl's arrangement, and on Capitol with Nelson Riddle's arrangement. This version is featured in the film Radio Days.

In 1944, Jaffe took credit for words and music, without collaboration, on "Bell Bottom Trousers"—although he freely admitted that it wasn't an entirely original concept. For a hundred years or more, sailors sang a much bawdier version of the tune, much too "blue" for the times. Jaffe's cleaned-up version was tame enough for Ruth McCullough to sing when Tony Pastor's orchestra recorded the song. And additional recordings by Guy Lombardo, Louis Prima, Jerry Colonna and others made "Bell Bottom Trousers" Tune-Dex Digest's number two selling song for 1944-45 (second to "Don't Fence Me In").

In the mid-1940s, Jaffe formed a business collaboration with Paul Kapp, a personal manager for musical artists. Together, they founded General Music Publishing Company, which had its first big hit in 1948 with Jaffe's song "I'm My Own Grandpaw", co-written with Dwight Latham. Latham was a singer with The Jesters, a popular trio known for their novelty songs. He was probably the one who remembered an anecdote, then attributed to Mark Twain, that described someone who became his own grandfather by marrying his daughter's stepmother.

More likely, the idea for "Grandpaw" may have derived from a story called "Singular Intermarriages," which was published in C.C. Bombaugh's Gleanings for the Curious from the Harvest-Fields of Literature (1874). Whatever its origins, "I'm My Own Grandpaw" has been consistently performed and recorded ever since, including a 2001 release by Willie Nelson.

Other songs in the Jaffe catalog include "Oh, You Sweet One," written with Paul Kapp in 1949, recorded by The Andrews Sisters; "Bread and Gravy", written with Dwight Latham in 1948, recorded by Homer and Jethro; "I Don't Know from Nothin'", written with Henry Tobias in 1949, recorded by Don Cornell and Laura Leslie with the Sammy Kaye Orchestra; "It's Just a Matter of Opinion," written with Carl Lampl in 1946, recorded by Gene Krupa; and "Charlie Was a Boxer", written with George Keefer and Vincent Lopez in 1940, and recorded by Lopez.

A few Jaffe songs have a spiritual or gospel flavor, such as: "Get Together with the Lord", written with Bickley Reichner in 1945, recorded by Andy Kirk's Orchestra with The Jubalaires; "Pray", written with Reichner and Clay Boland in 1950, recorded by Hank Snow; "Just Whisper", written with Reichner in 1951, recorded by Savannah Churchill; and "These Things Are Known (Only to God)", written with Paul Kapp in 1951, and recorded by Jan Peerce.

By the 1960s, the music industry had changed dramatically, and the kind of songs Jaffe wrote fell out of public favor. A few of his tunes continued to be recorded, especially "Gypsy in My Soul", primarily by jazz artists, and "Grandpaw", mostly by country singers. Also, General Music Publishing enjoyed a few more prosperous years by publishing a song called "I Left My Heart in San Francisco", written by Douglass Cross and George Cory, and recorded by Tony Bennett.

By the time of Tony Bennett's hit, though, Jaffe was suffering from Parkinson's disease and his overall health was failing. He had lived in Teaneck, New Jersey for many years, and died at a hospital in nearby Englewood, New Jersey, on December 2, 1972.
