= If I Had My Life to Live Over =

Popular Song written by Moe Jaffe

"If I Had My Life to Live Over" is a popular song.

It was written by Moe Jaffe, Larry Vincent and Henry Tobias and published in 1939.

Larry Vincent and The Feilden Foursome reached the Billboard pop charts in 1947 with a peak position of No. 20. The song is now a recognized standard, recorded by many artists.
