= Keyport High School =

Public secondary school in Monmouth County, New Jersey, United States

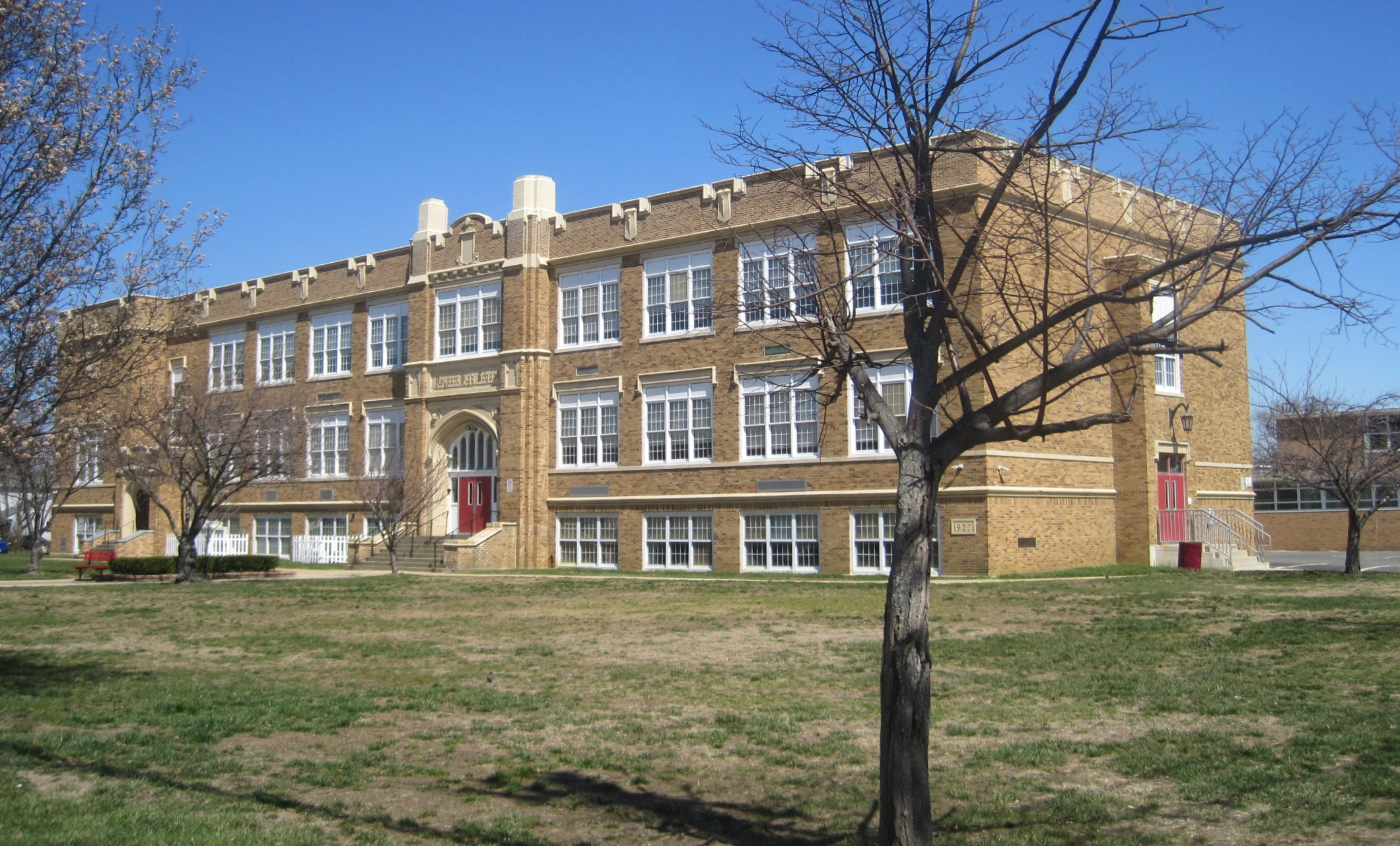

Location
- 351 Broad Street; Keyport, Monmouth County, New Jersey 07735; United States; 40.42883°N 74.197447°W

Information
- Type: Public high school
- Established: 1927
- School district: Keyport Public Schools
- NCES School ID: 340795003888
- Principal: Michael P. Waters Sr."
- Faculty: 33.5 FTEs
- Grades: 9-12
- Enrollment: 372 (as of 2024–25)
- Student to teacher ratio: 11.1:1
- Colors: Red and white
- Athletics conference: Shore Conference
- Team name: Red Raiders
- Publication: Portals (literary magazine)
- Website: www.kpsdschools.org/o/highschool

Keyport High School is a four-year public high school in Keyport, in Monmouth County, in the U.S. state of New Jersey, serving students in ninth through twelfth grades, operated as the lone secondary school of the Keyport Public Schools. Students from Union Beach attend the high school as part of a sending/receiving relationship with the Union Beach School System. The existing three-story building was constructed in 1927.

As of the 2024–25 school year, the school had an enrollment of 372 students and 33.5 classroom teachers (on an FTE basis), for a student–teacher ratio of 11.1:1. There were 134 students (36.0% of enrollment) eligible for free lunch and 29 (7.8% of students) eligible for reduced-cost lunch.

== History ==
The high school opened for the 1927–28 school year with a building constructed at a cost of $180,000 (equivalent to $1.9 million in 2025), at which time students from Raritan Township (since renamed as Hazlet) began attending the high school as part of a sending/receiving relationship. By 1931, the school had 132 out-of-district students in attendance, including 62 from Union Beach, 47 from Raritan Township and 21 from Holmdel Township.

== Awards, recognition and rankings ==
The school was the 216th-ranked public high school in New Jersey out of 339 schools statewide in New Jersey Monthly magazine's September 2014 cover story on the state's "Top Public High Schools", using a new ranking methodology. The school had been ranked 226th in the state of 328 schools in 2012, after being ranked 249th in 2010 out of 322 schools listed. The magazine ranked the school 265th in 2008 out of 316 schools. The school was ranked 207th in the magazine's September 2006 issue, which surveyed 316 schools across the state.

== Athletics ==
The Keyport High School Red Raiders compete in Division B Central of the Shore Conference, an athletic conference comprised of public and private high schools in Monmouth and Ocean counties along the Jersey Shore. The league operates under the jurisdiction of the New Jersey State Interscholastic Athletic Association (NJSIAA). With 285 students in grades 10–12, the school was classified by the NJSIAA for the 2019–20 school year as Group I for most athletic competition purposes, which included schools with an enrollment of 75 to 476 students in that grade range. The school's co-op team with Henry Hudson Regional was classified by the NJSIAA as Group I South for football for 2024–2026, which included schools with 185 to 482 students.

Keyport High School's interscholastic sports include: football, basketball, cheerleading for football/basketball, field hockey, wrestling, baseball, softball, track and field, cross country, indoor track, soccer, and tennis. The school participates as the host school / lead agency for joint cooperative girls soccer, boys / girls volleyball and wrestling teams with Henry Hudson Regional High School, while Henry Hudson is the host school for cross country running, boys / girls tennis and winter track teams. Keyport is also the lead agency / host school for joint field hockey and football teams with Keansburg High School. These co-op programs operate under agreements scheduled to expire at the end of the 2023–24 school year.

The football program, led by Coach Michael "Chic" Ciccoteli is probably the school's most notable. For the 2002-03 the team was "On the Road," as the home field was under construction. The Keyport Red Raiders went on to play an undefeated season and win their state championship. Every game was won except the championship, giving the team a 21–1 record for the 2002–03 and 2003–04 seasons. The football team has won the Central Jersey Group I state sectional championship in 1987, 1988, 1992, 1998, 1999 and 2002. The 1992 team finished the season with a 9–2 record after scoring the lone touchdown of the game in a 6–2 win against Dunellen High School for the Central Jersey Group I championship. The team won the Central Jersey, Group I state sectional title in 1999 with a 21–0 shutout of South River High School. The team repeated in 2002 with a 37–6 win against South River High School.

The boys' basketball team took the Group II state championship in 1933, winning by a score of 26–22 in the championship game against a Cranford High School team that came into the finals with a 21-game winning streak. In 2004, the team won the Central Jersey Group I sectional championship, topping Piscataway Technical High School 53–40 in the final game of the tournament.

The baseball team won the Central Jersey Group II sectional title in 1961. The team won the Central Jersey Group I state sectional championship in 2001 with a 10–0 win over Highland Park High School.

The field hockey team won the Central Jersey, Group I state sectional title in 1978 and 1979.

The girls' basketball team won the Group I title in 1983 (vs. New Providence High School) and 1995 (vs. Bogota High School). The 1983 team finished the season with a 24–5 record after winning the Group I state title by defeating New Providence by a score of 54–53 in the championship game played at the Rutgers Athletic Center. The 1995 team held off a rally by Bogota to win the Group I championship game by a score of 52-46 and advanced to the Tournament of Champions seeded sixth before falling to third-seeded Middle Township High School 46–37 in the quarterfinals to finish the season with a record of 21–6.

The boys' wrestling team won the Central Jersey Group I state sectional title in 1983.

The girls' bowling team won the Group I state championship in 2009.

== Clubs ==
Keyport High School clubs include: Key Club, National Honor Society, Raiders Inc., Student Council, SAC, Lifeline/VIPS, Drama, Literary Magazine, and Yearbook.

== Administration ==
The school's principal is Michael P. Waters Sr., who is joined on his administration team by an assistant principal / athletic director.

== Notable alumni ==
- Piotr Czech (born 1986), NFL placekicker
- John Earle (born 1968, class of 1987), American football player who played for two seasons in the Canadian Football League for the Baltimore Stallions as a guard and center
- Juanita Hall (1901–1968), musical theatre and film actress known for her roles in South Pacific and Flower Drum Song
- Kenneth Hand (1899–1988), politician who served in the New Jersey Senate and judge on New Jersey Superior Court
- Moe Jaffe (1901–1972), songwriter and bandleader
- Sayra Fischer Lebenthal (1898-1994; class of 1915), Wall Street banker credited for introducing the idea of selling small lots of municipal bonds to individual investors
