= Alexandra Lebenthal =

American novelist

- Born: Alexandra Lebenthal; March 11, 1964 (age 62); New York, U.S.
- Education: Princeton University (BA)
- Known for: President and CEO, Lebenthal & Company
- Spouse: Jay Diamond
- Children: Eleanor, Charlotte, and Benjamin Diamond
- Parent: James A. Lebenthal
- Family: Sayra Fischer Lebenthal (grandmother)

Alexandra Lebenthal (born March 11, 1964) is an American businesswoman. She was the President and Chief Executive Officer of the municipal bond franchise Lebenthal & Company until June 2017.

== Early life and education ==
Lebenthal was born to a Jewish family. Her father is James A. Lebenthal. Her grandparents, Louis and Sayra Fischer Lebenthal, founded Lebenthal & Company in 1925.

Lebenthal graduated with an A.B in history from Princeton University in 1986 after graduating from the Nightingale-Bamford School.

== Career ==
Lebenthal started her career in municipal bond investing at Kidder, Peabody & Company.

In 1988, Lebenthal followed in the footsteps of her father James A. Lebenthal and became the company spokesperson. By 1995 she became the company's president and CEO at the age of 31. In 2001, Lebenthal & Company was sold to AdVest, which was later acquired by Merrill Lynch. In 2007, Lebenthal regained the rights to the name for a reported sum of $1,000.

In 1999, Lebenthal was named one of New York's 100 most influential women by Crain's New York Business. In 2012, Fortune called Alexandra Lebenthal "The new queen of Wall Street." She has also been named one of the top 50 Women in Wealth Management by Wealth Manager Magazine.

Lebenthal authored a novel entitled Recessionistas in 2013.

She stepped down as CEO in 2017, and her brother James, chief of asset management, left as well.

In 2017, James Cayne sued Lebenthal for allegedly refusing to fully repay a personal loan in the amount of $1 million, and in October 2017 a New York judge ruled in his favor.

== Boards and philanthropy ==
Lebenthal has served on the boards of the School of American Ballet, the New York Botanical Garden, and The Committee of 200, an organization for businesswomen. She also co-founded The Women's Executive Circle, a women's mentorship program.

== Personal life ==
Lebenthal married Jay Diamond and has three children: Ellie, Charlotte, and Ben.

She is a member of Kappa Beta Phi.
