= James A. Lebenthal =

American businessman and author (1928–2014)

- Born: James Avram Lebenthal; June 22, 1928
- Died: November 14, 2014 (aged 86); New York City
- Education: Princeton University (B.A.)
- Occupations: Businessman; filmmaker
- Spouse: Jacqueline Beymer
- Children: 3, including Alexandra Lebenthal
- Mother: Sayra Fischer Lebenthal

James "Jim" Avram Lebenthal (June 22, 1928 – November 14, 2014) was an American businessman, specialized in municipal bonds. Earlier in his career he also worked as a journalist, filmmaker and copywriter. In 1959 he was nominated for the Academy Award for Best Live Action Short Film for his first and only film production T Is for Tumbleweed.

== Life ==
Lebenthal was born in 1928. He attended Princeton University and graduated 1949 with a Bachelor of Arts. Afterwards he worked as journalist for Life magazine and NBC, in filmmaking at The Walt Disney Company and as copywriter for Ogilvy & Mather and Young & Rubicam.

Lebenthal wrote the script and produced the short film T Is for Tumbleweed in 1958, directed by Louis Clyde Stoumen. The film starred the five-year-old Anne Lockhart. The movie was nominated at the 31st Academy Awards for the Academy Award for Best Live Action Short Film, but ultimately lost to the Walt Disney production Grand Canyon.

In 1963 he joined Lebenthal & Company, formerly led by his mother Sayra Fischer Lebenthal. In the 1970s he created a marketing campaign for municipal bonds with TV and radio spots. In 1995 he shifted the responsibility for the company to his daughter Alexandra Lebenthal. The family sold the business to Advest, Inc. for 25 million USD in 2001. In 2006 Lebenthal left the company, when Advest sold Lebenthal & Company to Merrill Lynch. In the same year he published his first book Confessions of a Municipal Bond Salesman. Two years later he and his daughter Alexandra founded the new businesses Lebenthal & Co. LLC and Wealth and Family Office Management, Alexandra & James.

Lebenthal received several prizes, such as the lifetime awards of the National Federation of Municipal Analysts and The Bond Market Association.

== Personal life ==
He was married to Jacqueline Beymer Lebenthal (1930–2010) until her death. They had two daughters and a son. He died in New York City on November 14, 2014 at the age of 86 after suffering a heart attack.

== Works ==
- Jim Lebenthal, Bernice Kanner: Confessions of a Municipal Bond Salesman. John Wiley & Sons, 2006, 226 Seiten, ISBN 978-0471771746
- Jim Lebenthal: Lebenthal On Munis – Straight Talk About Tax Free Municipal Bonds For The Troubled Investor Deciding, “Yes…” or “No!” Morgan-James Publishing, 2009, 160 Seiten, ISBN 978-1600376566
