= Sayra Fischer Lebenthal =

American lawyer

Sayra I. Fischer Lebenthal (October 17, 1898 – March 18, 1994) was a municipal bond dealer/broker and investment banker in New York City. In 1925, at the age of 27, she co-founded municipal bond brokerage firm Lebenthal & Company in Manhattan (New York City) with her husband Louis Solomon Lebenthal. The Lebenthals were responsible for "democratizing" the municipal bond business, which had long been almost the exclusive province of the rich and of institutional investors such as insurance companies. Sayra continued to work full time in the business until retiring in 1992 at the age of 93. After Louis’ death in 1951, Sayra became the first woman to run a Wall Street brokerage firm. Among her innovations was organizing a department exclusively for women investors.

== Biography ==
Sayra I. Fischer's parents were Joseph F. Fischer (1865-1948) and Anna Abramowitz (1868-1924). Joseph and Anna had both been born in Ruś, Olsztyn County, Warmia-Masuria, Poland, before emigrating to the United States. They were married in 1895, presumably in the United States. Sayra was the third of four daughters born to Joseph and Anna Fischer. Sayra's sisters were Bessie Fischer (1895-1969), Etta (Ettie) E. Fischer (1896-1980), and Hilda Fischer (1902-1968).

Sayra was born and raised in Keyport, Monmouth County, New Jersey. She graduated from Keyport High School in 1915, then attended Syracuse University College of Law, graduating in 1920 as one of only two women in the class to earn a law degree. She was admitted to the New York Bar in 1923.

Sayra married Louis Solomon Lebenthal (May 15, 1899 - December 1951) on March 11, 1925. Several months after their marriage, the Lebenthals announced on November 28, 1925 that they were forming a bond brokering partnership named Lebenthal & Company. Eventually the Lebenthals began specializing in selling odd lots (small lots) of municipal bonds to small investors, thus broadening ("democratizing") a market that had traditionally been open only to wealthy investors. After her husband's death in 1951, Sayra remained in the business and developed a focus on tax-exempt municipal bonds for small investors.

In 1956 Sayra married attorney I. Arnold Ross (1897-1981), who became legal counsel to Lebenthal & Company.

Sayra's daughter Eleanor Lebenthal Bissinger worked at the firm alongside her husband for nearly twenty years. Her son Jim Lebenthal, was the firm's chairman and spokesman, until 1995 when he shifted the responsibility for the company to his daughter Alexandra Lebenthal, one of Sayra’s five grandchildren.

Sayra died on March 18, 1994, aged 95, after a lengthy illness.

== Honors ==
The Sayra Fischer Lebenthal Award for Professional Excellence in Finance is presented to a woman in the financial services profession who, like Sayra, believed in teaching women the importance of understanding their investments and taking responsibility for their financial lives.

== Sources ==
- Fritz, Roger - "Wars of Succession: The Blessings, Curses and Lessons that Family-Owned Firms Offer Anyone in Business". (Silver Lake Publishing, 2005): 106.
- Lebenthal, Jim (with Bernice Kanner) - Confessions of a Municipal Bond Salesman (Hoboken, NJ: John Wiley & Sons, Inc., 2006)
- Lebenthal, Jim - Lebenthal on Munis - Straight Talk About Tax Free Municipal Bonds for the Troubled Investor Deciding 'Yes' . . . or 'No' (Garden City, NY: Morgan James, 2009) (146 p.)
