= 89th Cavalry Regiment =

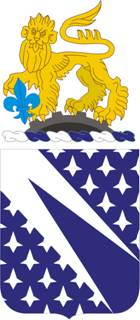
- Coat of Arms
- Active: 1940 - present
- Country: United States
- Allegiance: United States
- Branch: Armor
- Type: Cavalry
- Role: Reconnaissance, Surveillance, and Target Acquisition
- Size: Regiment
- Part of: Squadron
- Nickname: Ole' 89th
- Motto: READY NOW!
- Branch color: Yellow
- Mascot: Wolverine (1st Squadron)
- Decorations: Presidential Unit Citation

Commanders
- Notable commanders: COL Mark Suich

Insignia
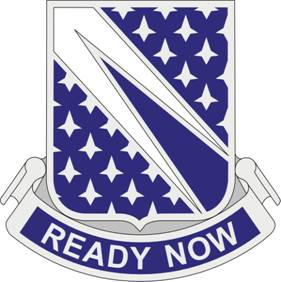
- Distinctive Unit Insignia

The 89th Cavalry Regiment is a Regiment of the United States Army first established in 1940.

== History ==
1st Squadron History

1st Squadron, 89th Cavalry Regiment deployed to Germany in 1944 (then known as 899th Tank Destroyer Battalion). The unit saw little action during the War, but still had notable moments. 1st Squadron was patrolling near a town named Scherpenseel in Holland where it was ambushed by a German artillery unit. The unit was pinned down until SSG Herschel F. Briles laid down heavy machine gun fire. This suppressive fire resulted in multiple German casualties and surrenders. SSG Briles was awarded the Medal of Honor for his actions.

The next time that the 1st Squadron, 89th Cavalry Regiment had a notable deployment was in 2006 to Iraq. During this fifteen-month deployment, soldiers of the 1st Squadron killed and captured over 200 high-value targets (HVT). 1st Squadron also seized 57 major weapons caches, which helped its fight against the Iraqi insurgency. 1st Squadron, 89th Cavalry Regiment returned to Iraq in 2009. This deployment included training the Iraqi Police, incapacitating HVTs, and raiding known insurgence hideouts and weapon caches.

3rd Squadron History

The 3rd Squadron, 89th Cavalry Regiment also draws its heritage from the 899th Tank Destroyer Battalion. After arriving in Casablanca January 26, 1943, they received M10 tank destroyers. They left and joined British forces in the Gafsa-El Guettar sector, Tunisia, on 16 March 1943. After briefly deploying to the Naples region of Italy they were almost immediately rerouted to the United Kingdom in preparation of Operation Overlord (D Day). The liaison party went first with the 82nd Airborne gliding in to facilitate post landing coordination. The 899th went ashore at Utah Beach (minus two companies). They fought in support of the main effort to seize Cherbourg, often protecting the infantries flank as American forces pressed the attack from Azeville, Le Bisson, Ozeville and finally Cherbourg in June. After this the unit supported the Cobra breakout in late July, advanced through Mayenne and entered Belgium on the 2nd of September. They supported the 9th Infantry Division operations in vicinity of Monschau and Hofen, Germany, fought in Rötgen/Hürtgen Forest region in October and elements deployed in first days of Battle of the Bulge to stop German advance.

3rd Squadron continued to face tough fights in the areas of Beaufort and St. Vith in December 1944. The unit was not lacking in heroism during this time with two Medal of Honor recipients, one being the aforementioned Herschel Floyd Briles and Horace Marvin Thorne. CPL Thorne received the Medal of Honor posthumously for the following:

  He was the leader of a combat patrol on 21 December 1944, near Grufflingen, Belgium, with the mission of driving German forces from dug-in positions in a heavily wooded area. As he advanced his light machine gun, a German Mark III tank emerged from the enemy position and was quickly immobilized by fire from American light tanks supporting the patrol. Two of the enemy tankmen attempted to abandon their vehicle but were killed by Cpl. Thorne's shots before they could jump to the ground. To complete the destruction of the tank and its crew, Cpl. Thorne left his covered position and crept forward alone through intense machine-gun fire until close enough to toss two grenades into the tank's open turret, killing two more Germans. He returned across the same fire-beaten zone as heavy mortar fire began falling in the area, seized his machine gun, and, without help, dragged it to the knocked-out tank and set it up on the vehicle's rear deck. He fired short rapid bursts into the enemy positions from his advantageous but exposed location, killing or wounding eight. Two enemy machine-gun crews abandoned their positions and retreated in confusion. His gun jammed; but rather than leave his self-chosen post he attempted to clear the stoppage; enemy small-arms fire, concentrated on the tank, killed him instantly. Cpl. Thorne, displaying heroic initiative and intrepid fighting qualities, inflicted costly casualties on the enemy and insured the success of his patrol's mission by the sacrifice of his life.

The Squadron as the 899th would continue to fight through Europe upgrading from M10 to M36 tank destroyers along the way. The 899th supported the attack to capture Roer River dams in February, 1945, crossed Roer River 28 February and advanced to the Rhine near Bad Godesberg. The first elements crossed into Remagen bridgehead on 8 March and joined the attack on Ruhr Pocket in April moving east into Harz Mountains. The unit then moved to the Mulde River for link-up with Soviet forces completing link-up on 27 April 1945. Having fought valiantly through Europe they began occupation duty in Bernburg 3 May 1945.

Elements of the 899th still recovering from heavy casualties occupied rear areas in France. While in France they performed Military Police duties.

Many activations and deactivations restricted the unit from deploying again until 2006 in Iraq. The most recent deployment was in 2015 in Afghanistan. They are still active to this day and serve in our country's modern day combat zones.

== Recent history ==
On 13 August 2006, the 1st Squadron, 89th Cavalry Regiment deployed with the 2nd Brigade Combat Team, 10th Mountain Division (LI) to South Baghdad in support of Operation Iraqi Freedom 06–08. During the 15-month deployment, the Squadron secured the main supply route into Baghdad, killed 12 insurgents, captured 198 (including 2BCT HVT #1), and uncovered 57 caches, ensuring that thousands of munitions stayed out of enemy hands. During this deployment, the Squadron lost 4 soldiers to enemy action, all from Bravo Troop. The 1st Squadron, 89th Cavalry Regiment redeployed to Fort Drum, NY in November 2007 and began preparations for their next deployment.

Training from 2007 to 2009 included two rotations to the Joint Readiness Training Center at Fort Polk, Louisiana as well as a month-long off-post training exercise at Yuma, Arizona where the Troopers honed their skills in Reconnaissance, Surveillance and Target Acquisition. Initially scheduled to deploy to Afghanistan in November 2009, the First Squadron, 89th Cavalry received orders to return to Iraq that October.

The 1st Squadron, 89th Cavalry Regiment deployed along with the 2nd Brigade Combat Team, 10th Mountain Division (LI) to Southeast Baghdad on 18 October 2009 in support of Operation Iraqi Freedom 09–10. During the deployment, The 1st Squadron, 89th Cavalry Regiment was partnered with the 3rd Brigade, 1st Iraqi Federal Police, following and supporting the Iraqi organization while the Iraqis maintained control of the area Southeast of Baghdad. Through a training Academy called Task Force Nassir, the Squadron trained Iraqi Federal Police NCOs, eventually training the Iraqis to run the academy themselves allowing complete control of Task Force Nassir to be handed over to the Iraqi Federal Police. Alpha Troop, through operation "Golden Warrant," captured several high value targets resulting in improved security for the local Iraqi civilian population. During Operation Eye Drop, Bravo Troop air assaulted onto land suspected to contain insurgents smuggling weapons and personnel into Baghdad. Charlie Troop conducted Sons of Iraq revitalizing training throughout the deployment, which trained more than 1,000 SOI in basic checkpoint operations, buddy aid, and vehicle search techniques. The combined efforts of the 1st Squadron, 89th Cavalry Regiment resulted in the continued steady decline of sectarian violence throughout the region and contributed to the security and stability of the area. In March 2010, the Squadron supported the free elections of Iraq. This election signified the first time in the region's 5,000 year history that one democratically elected government handed over power peacefully to another democratically elected government. In the closing weeks of the deployment, The 1st Squadron, 89th Cavalry Regiment secured 400 square kilometers of terrain in support of 2nd Brigade, 10th Mountain Division's retrograde throughout the Wolverine's operating environment. Initially ordered to Iraq for 12 Months, the Squadron completed their mission and was able to redeploy three months early in June 2010.

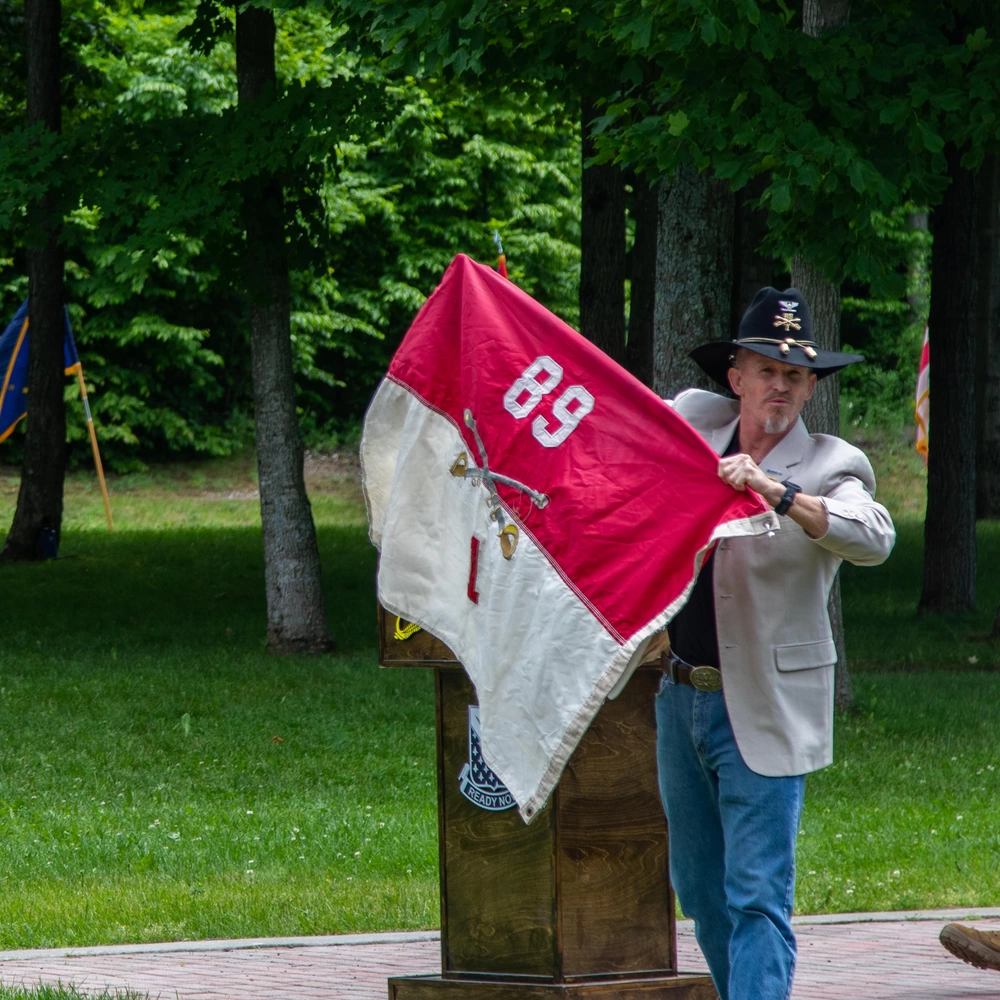
Col.(Retired) Mark Suich, the first commander of 1/89 receives the flag flown during the squadron’s deployments in the early 2000s, during the unit’s inactivation ceremony at Memorial Park

On June 7, 2024 the unit held its inactivation ceremony at Memorial Park on Fort Drum in front of the 10th Mountain Division Headquarters, with Col.(Retired) Mark Suich, the first commander of the 1st Squadron, 89th Cavalry Regiment presiding over the ceremony .

== Lineage ==
Constituted 1 June 1940 in the Regular Army as the 10th Antitank Battalion.

- Redesignated 99th Antitank Battalion, 11 June 1940.
- Redesignated 99th Infantry Battalion (Antitank) and activated at Fort Lewis Wa. 1 July 1940.
- Redesignated 99th Infantry Antitank Battalion, 24 July 1941.
- Redesignated 899th Tank Destroyer Battalion 15 December 1941.
- Inactivated 27 December 1945 at Camp Kilmer NJ.
- Redesignated 899th Tank Battalion, 23 July 1953
- Activated 17 January 1955 in Germany.
- Inactivated 1 May 1958 in Germany.
- Designated to 89th Cavalry Regiment on 30 March 2004.
- 89th Regiment slated for Inactivation by Dept. Of Army, as announced in February 2024, that U.S.-based Stryker and infantry brigade cavalry squadrons will be inactivated inline with force restructuring.

Lineage of 1st Squadron

- March 30, 2004- 2nd Squadron, 71st Cavalry Regiment re-flagged to 1st Battalion, 89th Cavalry Regiment
- Known today as 1st Squadron, 89th Cavalry Regiment
- Inactivated June 7, 2024 at Fort Drum, NY.

Lineage of 3rd Squadron

- July 15, 1942- 89th Cavalry Reconnaissance Group was activated at Camp Carson.
- 1944- 89th Cavalry Reconnaissance Group reactivated to 89th Cavalry Reconnaissance Squadron
- 2006- 89th Cavalry Reconnaissance Squadron reactivated to 3rd Squadron, 89th Cavalry Regiment
- Inactivated June 28, 2024 at Fort Johnson, LA (Formerly Fort Polk)

== Distinctive unit insignia ==
- Description

A Silver color metal and enamel device 1 1/8 inches (2.9 cm) in height overall consisting of a shield blazoned: Azure, semé of caltrops Argent, on a bend of the second an elongated inverted pile of the first. Attached below the shield a Blue scroll inscribed "READY NOW" in Silver letters.

- Symbolism

The sprinkling of silver caltrops, an ancient military instrument, sometimes called "cheval trap" (from the French word horse) from its use in impeding the approach of cavalry-is symbolical of the first duty of the Tank Destroyer Battalions, i.e., to stop the advance of enemy tanks by obstacles strewn in their path and sharp attack from all points. The silver bend represents the forward path to be traveled as well as Highway 99, the birthplace of the unit and the scene of their first arduous convoy. The inverted pile shooting forward from this bend further illustrates advance and the penetrating qualities of the battalion toward any obstacle encountered.

- Background

The distinctive unit insignia was originally approved for the 899th Tank Destroyer Battalion on 6 August 1942. It was redesignated for the 899th Tank Battalion on 25 April 1956. The insignia was redesignated for the 89th Cavalry Regiment on 23 December 2004.

== Coat of arms ==
=== Blazon ===
- Shield

Azure, semé of caltrops Argent, on a bend of the second an elongated inverted pile of the first.

- Crest

On a wreath of the colors Argent and Azure (Ultramarine Blue) upon a geared wheel of a tank track Proper issuant from base a lion passant guardant Or, the dexter forepaw resting on a fleur-de-lis Celeste. Motto READY NOW.

=== Symbolism ===
- Shield

The sprinkling of silver caltrops, an ancient military instrument, sometimes called "cheval trap" (from the French word horse) from its use in impeding the approach of cavalry-is symbolical of the first duty of the Tank Destroyer Battalions, i.e., to stop the advance of enemy tanks by obstacles strewn in their path and sharp attack from all points. The silver bend represents the forward path to be traveled as well as Highway 99, the birthplace of the unit and the scene of their first arduous convoy. The inverted pile shooting forward from this bend further illustrates advance and the penetrating qualities of the battalion toward any obstacle encountered.

- Crest

World War II campaigns in Europe, Italy and the Rhineland are recalled by the lion; the fleur-de-lis represents campaign participation in Northern France, Normandy and Ardennes-Alsace. The geared wheel refers to Tank Battalion heritage and Tank Destroyer history. Gold symbolizes excellence, the grey and Sable of the wheel denote strength and the determination to prevail.

- Background

The coat of arms was originally approved for the 899th Tank Destroyer Battalion on 6 August 1942. It was redesignated for the 899th Tank Battalion on 25 April 1956. The insignia was redesignated for the 89th Cavalry Regiment on 23 December 2004. The coat of arms was amended to add a crest on 9 February 2005.

== Current configuration ==
- 1st Squadron, 89th Cavalry Regiment, 10th Mountain Division Inactivated At Fort Drum
- 3rd Squadron, 89th Cavalry Regiment, 10th Mountain Division Inactivated at Fort Johnson (formerly Fort Polk), LA

== Campaign streamers ==
World War II

- Tunisia
- Rome-Arno
- Normandy (with arrowhead)
- Northern France
- Rhineland
- Ardennes-Alsace
- Central Europe

== See also ==
- List of armored and cavalry regiments of the United States Army
