= Keansburg School District =

School district in Monmouth County, New Jersey, US

Address
- 100 Palmer Place Keansburg, Monmouth County, New Jersey, 07734; United States
- Coordinates: 40.43722°N 74.129132°W

District information
- Grades: PreK-12
- Superintendent: Kathleen O’Hare
- Business administrator: Lindsey Case
- Schools: 4
- Affiliation: Former Abbott district

Students and staff
- Enrollment: 1,565 (as of 2023–24)
- Faculty: 130.2 FTEs
- Student–teacher ratio: 12.0:1

Other information
- District Factor Group: A
- Website: www.keansburg.k12.nj.us
Ind.	Per pupil	District spending	Rank (*)	K-12 average	%± vs. average
1A	Total Spending	$30,485	49	$18,891	61.4%
1	Budgetary Cost	19,771	48	14,783	33.7%
2	Classroom Instruction	11,360	48	8,763	29.6%
6	Support Services	4,289	49	2,392	79.3%
8	Administrative Cost	1,494	12	1,485	0.6%
10	Operations & Maintenance	2,032	43	1,783	14.0%
13	Extracurricular Activities	544	36	268	103.0%
16	Median Teacher Salary	57,400	16	64,043
Data from NJDoE 2014 Taxpayers' Guide to Education Spending. *Of K-12 districts with up to 1,800 students. Lowest spending=1; Highest=49

Keansburg School District is a public school district based in Keansburg, in the U.S. state of New Jersey, serving students in pre-kindergarten through twelfth grade. The district is one of 31 former Abbott districts statewide that were established pursuant to the decision by the New Jersey Supreme Court in Abbott v. Burke which are now referred to as "SDA Districts" based on the requirement for the state to cover all costs for school building and renovation projects in these districts under the supervision of the New Jersey Schools Development Authority.

As of the 2023–24 school year, the district, comprised of four schools, had an enrollment of 1,565 students and 130.2 classroom teachers (on an FTE basis), for a student–teacher ratio of 12.0:1.

== History ==
In May 2008, Governor Jon Corzine attempted to reduce a $740,000 retirement payout to outgoing superintendent Barbara Trzeszkowski. The package included nearly $185,000 for some 250 unused sick and vacation days, plus $555,000 in severance pay. The severance package, negotiated in a 2003 contract, awarded Trzeszkowski a payout calculated by multiplying her monthly salary by the 38 years she worked in the Keansburg district, that would be paid over a five-year period, on top of Trzeszkowski's estimated $120,000 annual pension. Corzine aimed to eliminate the $555,000 severance payout as being "an outrageous abuse of the state's publicly funded school system".

At the start of the 2016–17 school year, the Port Monmouth Road School (which had 501 students in grades PreK–2) was closed with the opening of the new Joseph C. Caruso School for grades K–4. The 122,000-square-foot (11,300 m^{2}) school was constructed at a cost of $51 million.

The district had been classified by the New Jersey Department of Education as being in District Factor Group "A", the lowest of eight groupings. District Factor Groups organize districts statewide to allow comparison by common socioeconomic characteristics of the local districts. From lowest socioeconomic status to highest, the categories are A, B, CD, DE, FG, GH, I and J.

== Schools ==
Schools in the district (with 2023–24 enrollment data from the National Center for Education Statistics) are:

Primary schools

- Keansburg Early Learning Center with 161 students in grade PreK
  - Anne Hazeldine, Principal
- Joseph C. Caruso School with 638 students in grades K–4
  - Elyse McMahon, Principal
- Joseph R. Bolger Middle School with 347 students in grades 6–8
  - Joseph Larocca, Principal

High school

- Keansburg High School with 385 students in grades 9–12
  - Sean Brophy, Principal

== Administration ==
Core members of the district's administration are:

- Kathleen O’Hare, superintendent
- Lindsey Case, business administrator
- Michael Sette, board secretary

== Board of education ==
The district's board of education, composed of nine members, sets policy and oversees the fiscal and educational operation of the district through its administration. As a Type II school district, the board's trustees are elected directly by voters to serve three-year terms of office on a staggered basis, with three seats up for election each year held (since 2012) as part of the November general election. The board appoints a superintendent to oversee the district's day-to-day operations and a business administrator to supervise the business functions of the district. 2024–25 Board of education members are Christopher J. Hoff (president), Michael Mankowski (vice president), Matthew C. Kitchen, Brooke Clayton, Kenneth Cook, Judy Ferraro, Kim Kelaher-Moran, Patricia Frizell and Catherine Ryan.
