= Keansburg High School =

High school in Monmouth County, New Jersey, US

Location
- 140 Port Monmouth Road; Keansburg, Monmouth County, New Jersey 07734; United States
- 40.441826°N 74.123579°W

Information
- Type: Public high school
- Established: 1968
- School district: Keansburg School District
- NCES School ID: 340786003880
- Principal: Michael John Herits
- Faculty: 33.8 FTEs
- Grades: 9–12
- Enrollment: 379 (as of 2024–25)
- Student to teacher ratio: 11.2:1
- Colors: Royal blue and orange
- Athletics conference: Shore Conference
- Team name: Titans
- Accreditation: Middle States Association of Colleges and Schools (candidate)
- Website: khs.keansburg.k12.nj.us

Keansburg High School is a four-year comprehensive community public high school serving students in ninth through twelfth grades from Keansburg, in Monmouth County, in the U.S. state of New Jersey, operating as the lone secondary school of the Keansburg School District. The school is a candidate for accreditation by the Middle States Association of Colleges and Schools Commission on Elementary and Secondary Schools.

As of the 2024–25 school year, the school had an enrollment of 379 students and 33.8 classroom teachers (on an FTE basis), for a student–teacher ratio of 11.2:1.

KHS is located at 140 Port Monmouth Road, but the school itself cannot be seen from Port Monmouth Road. The school is accessed via Titan Trail (the entrance road) into the parking lot. It is adjacent to Port Monmouth Road Elementary School (which should not be confused with Port Monmouth Elementary School in Port Monmouth), which was built well after the high school. One part of Port Monmouth Road Elementary School, once referred to as the "C-Wing," is slated to be returned for use for the high school following reconstruction. The reconstruction plans also plan to change the existing structure of the school district.

== History ==
Prior to the opening of the high school, students from Keansburg had attended Middletown High School, with the Middletown district seeing a drop of more than 400 Keansburg students based on the high school's opening. The building was constructed at a cost of $2 million (equivalent to $18.5 million in 2025) opened in September 1968. After the new school opened, the Middletown Township Public School District agreed that those Keansburg students who had previously been attending Middletown High School would be allowed to complete their education there on a tuition basis.

== Awards, recognition, and rankings ==
The school was the 281st-ranked public high school in New Jersey out of 339 schools statewide in New Jersey Monthly magazine's September 2014 cover story on the state's "Top Public High Schools," using a new ranking methodology. The school had been ranked 181st in the state of 328 schools in 2012, after being ranked 184th in 2010 out of 322 schools listed. The magazine ranked the school 147th in 2008 out of 316 schools. The school was ranked 263rd in the magazine's September 2006 issue, which surveyed 316 schools across the state. Schooldigger.com ranked the school as 306th out of 376 public high schools statewide in its 2010 rankings (a decrease of 26 positions from the 2009 rank) which were based on the combined percentage of students classified as proficient or above proficient on the language arts literacy and mathematics components of the High School Proficiency Assessment (HSPA).

== Athletics ==
The Keansburg High School Titans compete in Division B Central of the Shore Conference, an athletic conference comprised of public and private high schools in Monmouth and Ocean counties along the Jersey Shore. The league operates under the jurisdiction of the New Jersey State Interscholastic Athletic Association (NJSIAA). With 282 students in grades 10–12, the school was classified by the NJSIAA for the 2019–20 school year as Group I for most athletic competition purposes, which included schools with an enrollment of 75 to 476 students in that grade range. The school was classified by the NJSIAA as Group I South for football for 2024–2026, which included schools with 185 to 482 students.

The school participates in joint field hockey and football teams with Keyport High School as the host school / lead agency. These co-op programs operate under agreements scheduled to expire at the end of the 2023–24 school year.

The football team was awarded the NJSIAA Central Jersey Group I state championship in 1973 based on power points, and won the sectional playoffs in 1976, 1994 and 1996. The 1976 team finished the season with a 9–2 record and won the Central Jersey Group I sectional title, its first in the playoff era, with a 14–0 win against Highland Park High School in the championship game. The 1994 team won the Central Jersey Group I state sectional title with a 10–0 victory against South Hunterdon Regional High School in the championship game. In 2016, Keansburg alumni beat Keyport alumni 32–6 in the first annual alumni football game between these two schools.

The boys cross country team won the Group I state championship in 2005.

The boys' bowling team won the NJSIAA Central Jersey Group I state sectional championships and the Group I state championships in 2010, 2011 and 2012; the team won the Tournament of Champions in 2011.

== Administration ==
The school's principal is Michael John Herits. Core members of the school's administration include the vice principal and supervisor of athletics.
