= Donald Nash =

American contract killer

- Born: Donald J. Bowers; December 9, 1935; U.S.
- Died: June 2, 2016 (aged 80)
- Other name: Morris Rubin
- Convictions: Conspiracy to murder; Attempted murder; Abduction; Murder
- Penalty: 100-year sentence

Details
- Victims: 6 confirmed
- Country: United States
- States: Midtown Manhattan; New York; Queens; Ridgewood
- Date apprehended: April 19, 1982

Donald Nash (born Donald J. Bowers; December 9, 1935 – June 2, 2016) was an American criminal, who in 1982 committed two murders for hire and also killed three bystanders, and later killed a fellow prison inmate.

== Early life ==
Nash lived in Keansburg, New Jersey. He was born as Donald J. Bowers, and legally changed his name to Donald Nash in 1978. He held several odd jobs, including taxi driver and construction worker. Between 1952 and 1982, he was arrested seven times in New York and New Jersey. In 1981, he was convicted in New York of using forged documents to obtain a taxi medallion, but failed to appear for sentencing, resulting in a fugitive warrant for his arrest.

== Crimes ==
=== Background ===
Irwin Margolies was co-owner (with his wife Madeleine) and CEO of Candor Diamond Corporation, which traded in diamonds. In 1981, Candor Diamond went bankrupt, owing $5.7 million to financing house John P. Maguire and Co. The US Department of Justice investigated, suspecting fraud by Margolies. Margaret Barbera was the comptroller of Candor Diamond, and was involved in Margolies' fraud. She made a deal with prosecutors, pleading guilty to one count of fraud, with a recommendation of no prison time, in return for her cooperation against Margolies. Prosecutors allegedly told Margolies that Barbera and another woman employed by Candor would testify against him.

Margolies then hired Nash to eliminate the potential witnesses, paying him $8,000 for each killing.

=== Murder of Jenny Soo Chin ===
Jenny Soo Chin was a former Candor bookkeeper and friend of Margaret Barbera. On 5 January 1982, she visited Barbera in Ridgewood, Queens. When she left, a man in a ski mask forced her into her own car and then drove away. Chin was never seen again; the bloodstained car was found nine days later. The casing from a spent .22 cartridge was found in the car.

=== Murder of Margaret Barbera ===
On April 12, 1982, Margaret Barbera, a federal witness of Irwin Margulies's trial, lived at an apartment on Grandview Avenue in Ridgewood, Queens. She was murdered that day at a parking garage where she had leased a space, unaware that Nash had rented a neighboring space. While Nash was dragging her body to the car, three CBS Broadcasting technicians – Leo Kuranuki, Robert Schulze, and Edward Benford – had agreed to meet a colleague after work and happened to see Nash forcibly dragging Barbera's limp body toward a van. They tried to intervene and were each shot in the head by Nash, who then fled from the place. The next morning Barbera’s body was found in Manhattan. This was recognized as one of the most terrifying murder cases that occurred in the New York City during the 1980s.

=== Investigation ===
Police initially suspected the killer acted for some organized crime group.

The killer left .22 shell casings and discarded shoes and sunglasses at the murder scene. Barbera's body was found in lower Manhattan; she too had been shot in the head with a .22 bullet. Police now connected the garage killing to the disappearance of Chin. The spent cartridge from Chin's car was fired by the same gun used in the rooftop killings.

Since Barbera was a witness in a federal trial, the FBI joined the investigation. Nash became a suspect when investigators found he had rented the parking space adjacent to Barbera's, using his former name "Donald J. Bowers". FBI divers searched Waackaack Creek, near Nash's home, and found two more .22 shell casings which matched those from the murder. Yet another matching .22 shell casing was found in the home of Nash's nephew, Thomas Dane.

Nash was arrested a week later by Kentucky State Police near Frankfort, Kentucky, driving the getaway van, which had been repainted black. He was held on the fugitive warrant from the forgery conviction.

== Trial ==
Nash was charged in state court with the murders of Barbera and the three CBS employees, and conspiracy to murder Chin and Barbera.

The prosecution presented 136 witnesses, including Thomas Dane, who testified under immunity. They showed that Margolies had paid Nash $16,000 for killing Chin and Barbera, and an additional $5,000 because of the killings of the CBS employees. Nash's attorney, Lawrence Hochheiser, presented only one witness, an ophthalmologist who testified that Nash was nearly blind in one eye and had possible glaucoma. Hochheiser argued that Nash's poor vision "made him an unlikely hitman." Nash was found guilty of all charges on 24 May 1983. He was sentenced to 100 years imprisonment.

=== Margolies convictions ===
In November 1983, Irwin Margolies, who had paid Nash for the murders, pleaded guilty to federal fraud and was sentenced to 28 years in prison. His wife Madeleine pleaded guilty to lesser charges, and was sentenced to three years. Margolies was subsequently charged with the murders of Chin and Barbera, as well as conspiracy to murder them. Margolies was also charged with attempted murder for hire of David Blejwas, the attorney representing John P. Maguire and Co., the fraud victim. His former attorney, Henry Oestericher, testified under immunity that he had been the go-between.

On 21 June 1984, Margolies was convicted of the murders and conspiracy. He was sentenced to two consecutive terms of 25 years for the murders, and a concurrent term of eight years for conspiracy, all to be served after the federal sentence for fraud.

== Murder of Roy Tucker ==
Nash was held at Auburn Correctional Facility, and worked in the kitchen there. Roy Tucker, a murderer serving 25 years, was transferred to Auburn from Attica Correctional Facility in May 1994, and also worked in the kitchen. On 17 October 1994, as Tucker and Nash were preparing meals for other prisoners, Nash slashed Tucker to death "with a 12-inch board spiked with razor blades".

== Later developments ==
According to New York State Department of Corrections and Community Supervision records, Donald Nash, (Department Identification Number 83A4150) was marked as deceased from a heart attack on June 2, 2016.

An American author, Richard Hammer, wrote a book titled The CBS Murders which was originally published by the New American Library (NAL) in 1988. The book covers the story of the murders of the CBS employees.

== Books ==
- Hammer, Richard (1988). The CBS Murders. New American Library. p. 238. ISBN 9780451155443.
