= Keansburg, New Jersey =

Borough in Monmouth County, New Jersey, US

- Borough
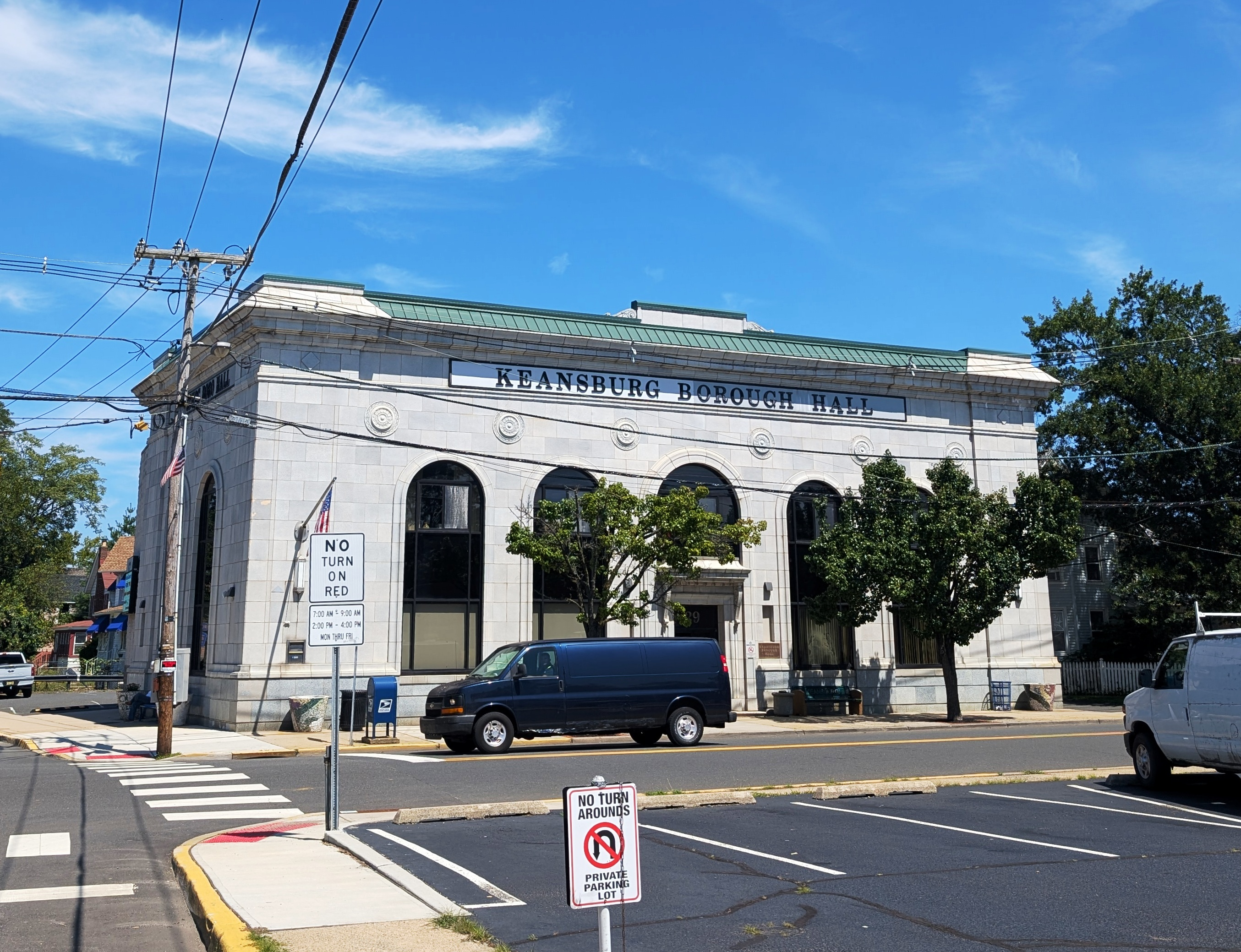
- Keansburg Borough Hall

- Seal
- Nickname: "Gem of the Bayshore"
- Map of Keansburg in Monmouth County. Inset: Location of Monmouth County highlighted in the State of New Jersey.

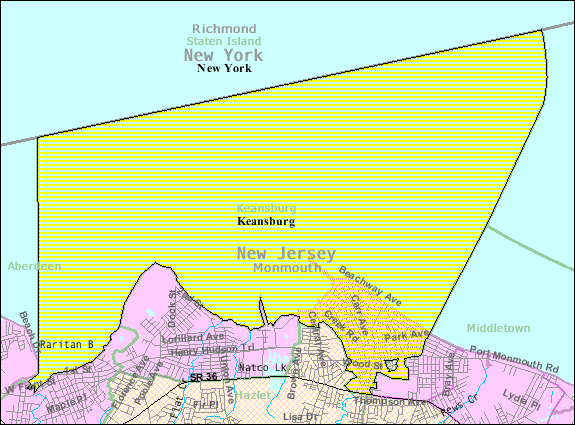
- Census Bureau map of Keansburg, New Jersey

- Location in Monmouth County Location in New Jersey Location in the United States
- Coordinates: 40.451869°N 74.155634°W
- Country: United States
- State: New Jersey
- County: Monmouth
- Incorporated: April 17, 1917
- Named after: John Kean

Government
  - Type: Faulkner Act (council–manager)
  - Body: Borough Council
  - Mayor: George Hoff (term ends June 30, 2026)
  - Administrator: Raymond B. O'Hare
  - Municipal clerk: Thomas P. Cusick

Area
  - Total: 16.44 sq mi (42.57 km^{2})
  - Land: 1.07 sq mi (2.78 km^{2})
  - Water: 15.37 sq mi (39.80 km^{2}) 93.59%
  - Rank: 167th of 565 in state 11th of 53 in county
- Elevation: 0 ft (0 m)

Population (2020)
  - Total: 9,755
  - Estimate (2023): 9,648
  - Rank: 250th of 565 in state 20th of 53 in county
  - Density: 9,099.8/sq mi (3,513.5/km^{2})
  - Rank: 43rd of 565 in state 3rd of 53 in county
- Time zone: UTC−05:00 (Eastern (EST))
  - Summer (DST): UTC−04:00 (Eastern (EDT))
- ZIP Code: 07734
- Area code: 732 exchanges: 471, 495, 787
- FIPS code: 3402536480
- GNIS feature ID: 0885265
- Website: keansburgnj.gov

Keansburg (/ˈkiːnzbɜːrɡ/ KEENZ-burg) is a borough in Monmouth County, in the U.S. state of New Jersey. As of the 2020 United States census, the borough's population was 9,755, a decrease of 350 (−3.5%) from the 2010 census count of 10,105, which in turn reflected a decline of 627 (−5.8%) from 10,732 in the 2000 census.

Keansburg was formed as a borough by an act of the New Jersey Legislature on March 26, 1917, from portions of both Middletown Township and Raritan Township (now Hazlet), based on the results of a referendum held on April 17, 1917.

Keansburg was part of the Bayshore Regional Strategic Plan, an effort by nine municipalities in northern Monmouth County to reinvigorate the area's economy by emphasizing its traditional downtowns, dense residential neighborhoods, maritime history, and the natural beauty of the Raritan Bay coastline. The plan has since been integrated into the 2016 Monmouth County Master Plan.

== History ==
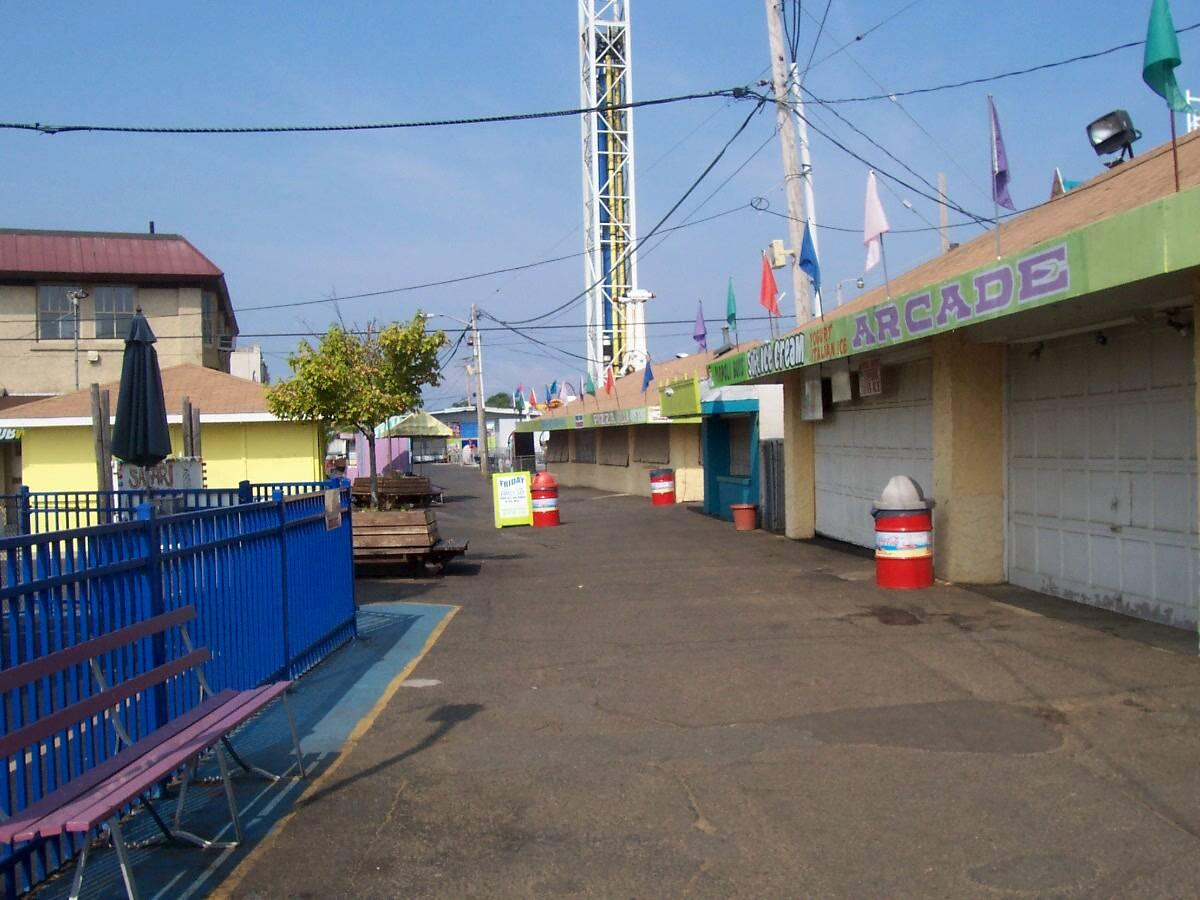
An early morning view of the midway in Keansburg Amusement Park

The land that is now Keansburg was earlier home to Lenni Lenape Native Americans.

On September 3, 1609, the Half Moon, captained by Henry Hudson, is said to have landed on the shores of present-day Keansburg (although some historians argue that the landing and forthcoming explained events took place at the tip of Sandy Hook). Crewmen of the ship were attacked by the Native Americans when they departed the ship, and John Colman was killed, making him what is said to be the first European to be murdered by a Native American. He is believed to have been buried in the area that is today the intersection of Carr Avenue and Beachway in an area known as "Colman's Point".

In the time between 1609 and the early 18th century, the land was gradually purchased from the Lenni Lenape, together with other surrounding areas. The area was inhabited by Dutch, English, and Scottish settlers. In the 18th century, farming proved to be successful on Keansburg's land, with specialties being pears, apples and corn (maize).

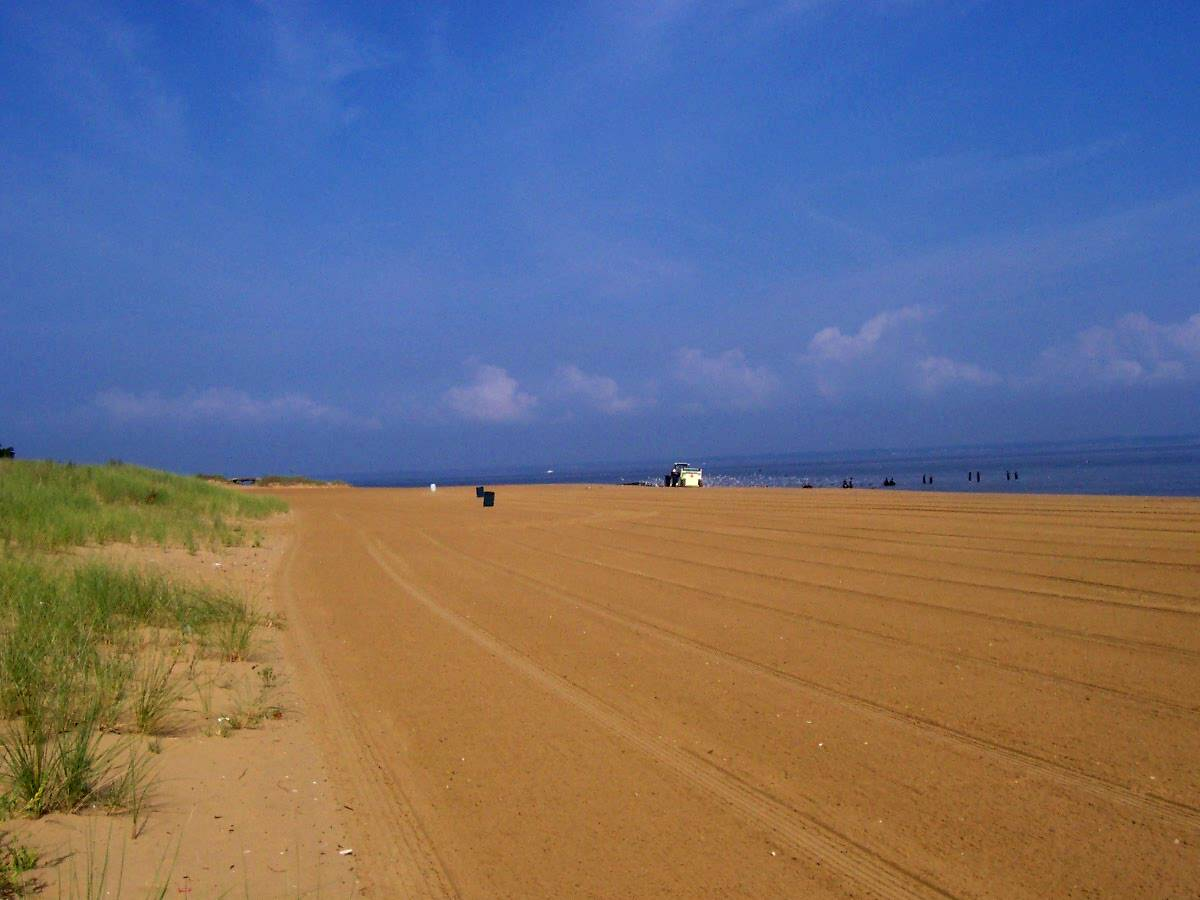
An early morning view of the beach in Keansburg circa August 2005

In this time, the settlement took on the name of Waackaack (pronounced "Way-kay-ack"), which came from the term "Wakioak" in the Lenape language meaning "Land of Plenty". The area was also widely known as Tanner's Landing from the early 18th century until approximately 1820, so named for the pier at the end of what was Tanner's Landing Road (now Main Street). Tanner's Landing was a principal port for the area for many years.

The area adopted its second official name of Granville, which derived from the importance of the Phillips Mill, and the grain-producing farms in the region. The name held until the 1880s. During the century, Granville became home to its own church, two lighthouses and small businesses. Roadways were beginning to form from repeated use of horse and buggies. The beach was already a favorite to visitors. Population was about 300 people, who mostly farmed and clammed for a living.

On Sunday, March 22, 1877, at "half past 9 o'clock," Granville welcomed the newly assigned pastor of the Granville Methodist Episcopal Church, William W. Ramsay. He later stated: "I arrived at the Granville Methodist Episcopal Church in Keansburg as pastor for the ensuing year. I soon learned that the hamlet consisted of about 300 inhabitants, whose occupations were mainly devoted to clamming & farming." At 19 years of age, Ramsay was slated to serve in the church for just one year. His success at the helm of church led to another year in Granville, after which he decided to make the village his permanent home. Ramsay and his wife, Eliza S. Wood, purchased the land that is 69 Church Street and opened a general store in 1881. In the coming years, Ramsay took greater and greater interest in Granville and eventually arranged a petition to establish a post office. The list of 132 names was passed on to John Kean of Elizabeth, a candidate for Congress. His efforts led to the opening of the post office in 1884, with Mrs. Ramsay serving as its first postmaster. That year, the name Keansburg was adopted in Kean's honor. A school was built at the cost of $30,000 in 1890 and sat on what is today the corner of Myrtle Avenue and Church Street (now Fallon Manor).

Further development continued with the creation of postcards depicting the village and land purchases, including acquisitions by William A. Gehlhaus and the Keansburg Beach Company. The Keansburg Steamboat Company was founded in 1910 primarily by Gelhaus as a means of providing transportation for New Yorkers who were interested in buying homes in Keansburg. In 1893, Gelhaus purchased a bakery business in Atlantic Highlands which he operated with his brothers until 1905. At that time he entered the real estate business in Keansburg. He was president of the New Point Comfort Beach Company which he formed with Jesse Sculthorp and Howard Roberts. The company owned a large real estate development in Keansburg and in 1906 laid out the Beachway. On June 18, 1909, the New Point Comfort Beach Company bought the steamboat Accomack in Norfolk, Virginia, and started a scheduled run from New York to Keansburg on July 1 that was intended as a way to bring prospective property buyers to Keansburg. Another real estate developer, Keansburg Heights Development Co., bought several thousand tickets. By July 21, more than $1,500 worth of tickets had been sold at $0.35 each. As the town became more populated, the Keansburg Beach Company sold off most of the surrounding land on Beachway Ave., keeping "just the boardwalk and amusement area."

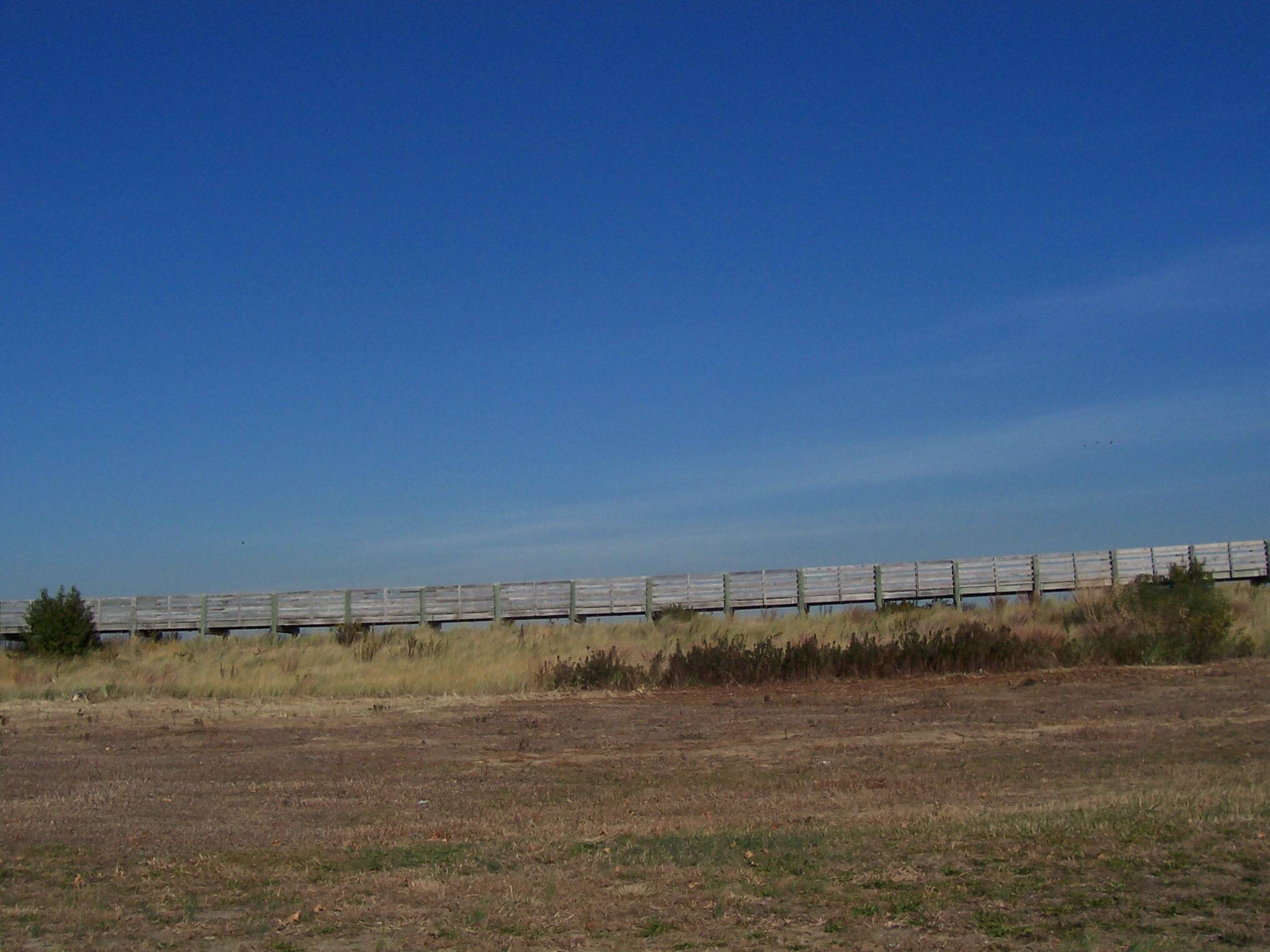
The boardwalk in Keansburg, New Jersey. The beach is on the opposite side

Tourists from New York City would ferry over and spend the weekend or summer vacation to escape the city heat, until Hurricane Donna wiped out much of the waterfront area in 1960. In 1969, the borough spent $7.9 million on the Bayshore Hurricane Protection Plan, which had been developed with state and federal funding from The New Jersey Bureau of Navigation and the United States Army Corps of Engineers. The redevelopment plan increased the size of the beaches to protect against future storms. A number of fires in the 1980s destroyed several structures near the beachfront. The Dance Hall Auditorium, Keansburg Bowling Alley and the Casino Theater were destroyed by fire during this time. Another notable fire occurred at the Beachview Rest Home on January 9, 1981, which claimed approximately 30 of more than 100 elderly and disabled residents living there.

The Gelhaus family re-acquired the Keansburg Amusement Park in 1995, following a 20-year absence after Henry Gelhaus had sold the property in 1972. The return of the Gelhaus family as proprietors of the amusement park sparked a resurgence of interest in the town. Upgrades were made to the amusement park grounds and a water park was constructed. Runaway rapids was opened in 1996 on the site of the former Crystal Pool. The Keansburg Waterfront Public Library, founded in 2004, was the result of a concerted effort on the part of townspeople and the borough government to provide a high quality library with resources that address the needs and interests of the community. In 2012, the town added a $3 million desalination plant with Federal Stimulus Funds and a low interest loan from the N.J. Environmental Infrastructure Trust, which greatly improved the quality of the water supply. The town had previously stopped providing well water, as saltwater intrusion into the aquifer had exceeded environmental protection standards. The new facility removes contaminants from the water supply through reverse osmosis.

== Geography ==
According to the United States Census Bureau, the borough had a total area of 16.79 square miles (43.47 km^{2}), including 1.07 square miles (2.78 km^{2}) of land and 15.71 square miles (40.70 km^{2}) of water (93.59%).

Unincorporated communities, localities and place names located partially or completely within the borough include Beacon Beach, Point Comfort and Tiltons Corner.

The borough has land borders with the Monmouth County municipalities of Hazlet Township, Middletown Township and has maritime borders with Union Beach; Aberdeen Township and Keyport, and the New York City borough of Staten Island across Raritan Bay. A small piece of Middletown Township measuring 13 acres (5.3 ha) is an exclave completely surrounded by Keansburg.

== Demographics ==
Historical population
Census	Pop.	Note	%±
1920	1,321		—
1930	2,190		65.8%
1940	2,904		32.6%
1950	5,559		91.4%
1960	6,854		23.3%
1970	9,720		41.8%
1980	10,613		9.2%
1990	11,069		4.3%
2000	10,732		−3.0%
2010	10,105		−5.8%
2020	9,755		−3.5%
2023 (est.)	9,648	▼	−1.1%
Population sources: 1920 1920–1930; 1940–2000 2000; 2010 2020

=== 2020 census ===
As of the 2020 census, Keansburg had a population of 9,755. The median age was 37.7 years. 22.7% of residents were under the age of 18 and 12.2% of residents were 65 years of age or older. For every 100 females there were 93.7 males, and for every 100 females age 18 and over there were 91.6 males age 18 and over.

100.0% of residents lived in urban areas, while 0.0% lived in rural areas.

There were 3,808 households in Keansburg, of which 30.3% had children under the age of 18 living in them. Of all households, 31.5% were married-couple households, 23.2% were households with a male householder and no spouse or partner present, and 35.3% were households with a female householder and no spouse or partner present. About 31.5% of all households were made up of individuals and 10.8% had someone living alone who was 65 years of age or older.

There were 4,361 housing units, of which 12.7% were vacant. The homeowner vacancy rate was 4.8% and the rental vacancy rate was 9.6%.

Racial composition as of the 2020 census
Race	Number	Percent
White	6,635	68.0%
Black or African American	1,027	10.5%
American Indian and Alaska Native	33	0.3%
Asian	275	2.8%
Native Hawaiian and Other Pacific Islander	5	0.1%
Some other race	723	7.4%
Two or more races	1,057	10.8%
Hispanic or Latino (of any race)	1,932	19.8%

=== 2010 census ===
The 2010 United States census counted 10,105 people, 3,805 households, and 2,409 families in the borough. The population density was 9,452.3 per square mile (3,649.6/km^{2}). There were 4,318 housing units at an average density of 4,039.1 per square mile (1,559.5/km^{2}). The racial makeup was 84.17% (8,505) White, 6.57% (664) Black or African American, 0.23% (23) Native American, 1.70% (172) Asian, 0.08% (8) Pacific Islander, 4.04% (408) from other races, and 3.22% (325) from two or more races. Hispanic or Latino of any race were 14.77% (1,493) of the population.

Of the 3,805 households, 29.7% had children under the age of 18; 36.8% were married couples living together; 19.2% had a female householder with no husband present and 36.7% were non-families. Of all households, 30.1% were made up of individuals and 8.6% had someone living alone who was 65 years of age or older. The average household size was 2.58 and the average family size was 3.24.

23.4% of the population were under the age of 18, 9.4% from 18 to 24, 28.6% from 25 to 44, 27.7% from 45 to 64, and 10.9% who were 65 years of age or older. The median age was 36.8 years. For every 100 females, the population had 95.6 males. For every 100 females ages 18 and older there were 90.8 males. The Census Bureau's 2006–2010 American Community Survey showed that (in 2010 inflation-adjusted dollars) median household income was $39,206 (with a margin of error of +/− $6,629) and the median family income was $52,128 (+/− $8,098). Males had a median income of $43,125 (+/− $8,899) versus $33,098 (+/− $4,163) for females. The per capita income for the borough was $21,246 (+/− $1,964). About 14.4% of families and 16.1% of the population were below the poverty line, including 21.3% of those under age 18 and 22.0% of those age 65 or over.

=== 2000 census ===
As of the 2000 United States census there were 10,732 people, 3,872 households, and 2,563 families residing in the borough. The population density was 9,954.4 inhabitants per square mile (3,843.4/km^{2}). There were 4,269 housing units at an average density of 3,959.7 per square mile (1,528.8/km^{2}). The racial makeup of the borough was 93.31% White, 2.13% African American, 0.10% Native American, 1.23% Asian, 0.07% Pacific Islander, 1.74% from other races, and 1.42% from two or more races. Hispanic or Latino of any race were 7.95% of the population.

There were 3,872 households, out of which 35.3% had children under the age of 18 living with them, 42.2% were married couples living together, 17.6% had a female householder with no husband present, and 33.8% were non-families. 27.4% of all households were made up of individuals, and 10.1% had someone living alone who was 65 years of age or older. The average household size was 2.71 and the average family size was 3.35.

In the borough the population was spread out, with 27.2% under the age of 18, 9.5% from 18 to 24, 31.2% from 25 to 44, 20.8% from 45 to 64, and 11.2% who were 65 years of age or older. The median age was 34 years. For every 100 females, there were 95.3 males. For every 100 females age 18 and over, there were 90.3 males.

The median income for a household in the borough was $36,383, and the median income for a family was $45,438. Males had a median income of $37,229 versus $28,398 for females. The per capita income for the borough was $17,417. About 15.5% of families and 17.7% of the population were below the poverty line, including 23.5% of those under age 18 and 18.4% of those age 65 or over.

== Parks and recreation ==
- Keansburg Amusement Park
- Runaway Rapids Waterpark
- Henry Hudson Trail
- Raritan Bayshore Waterfront Park
- John Donohue III Park
- Keansburg Firemen's Memorial Park was established in May 1938
- Forest Park
- St. John's Park
- World War II Memorial Park
- Friendship Park
- James Sidoti Skate Park

== Government ==
=== Local government ===
Keansburg operates within the Faulkner Act, formally known as the Optional Municipal Charter Law, under the Council-Manager form of municipal government. The borough is one of 42 municipalities (of the 564) statewide that use this form of government. Keansburg's governing body is comprised of the five-member Borough Council, whose members are elected at-large in non-partisan voting as part of the May municipal election to four-year terms of office on a staggered basis, with either two or three seats coming up for election in even-numbered years. In March 1974, voters passed a referendum by 1,508 to 1,142 that expanded the council from three members to its current five. At a reorganization meeting after each election, the council selects a mayor and deputy mayor from among its members for a two-year term.

As of 2025, members of the Keansburg Borough Council are Mayor George F. Hoff (term on council and as mayor ends June 30, 2026), Deputy Mayor Thomas M. Foley (term on council and as deputy mayor ends 2026), James Cocuzza Sr. (2026), Michael W. Donaldson (2026) and Sean D. Tonne (2026)

=== Federal, state and county representation ===
Keansburg is located in the 6th Congressional District and is part of New Jersey's 13th state legislative district.

For the 119th United States Congress, New Jersey's 6th congressional district is represented by Frank Pallone (D, Long Branch). New Jersey is represented in the United States Senate by Democrats Cory Booker (Newark, term ends 2027) and Andy Kim (Moorestown, term ends 2031).

For the 2026–2027 session, the 13th legislative district of the New Jersey Legislature is represented in the New Jersey Senate by Declan O'Scanlon (R, Little Silver) and in the General Assembly by Vicky Flynn (R, Holmdel Township) and Gerard Scharfenberger (R, Middletown Township).

Monmouth County is governed by a Board of County Commissioners composed of five members who are elected at-large to serve three-year terms of office on a staggered basis, with either one or two seats up for election each year as part of the November general election. At an annual reorganization meeting held in the beginning of January, the board selects one of its members to serve as director and another as deputy director.

As of 2025, Monmouth County's Commissioners are Director Thomas A. Arnone (R, Neptune City, 2025), Susan M. Kiley (R, Hazlet Township, 2027), Erik Anderson (R, Shrewsbury, 2026), Nick DiRocco (R, Wall Township, 2025), and Deputy Director Ross F. Licitra (R, Marlboro Township, 2026).

Constitutional officers elected on a countywide basis are Clerk Christine Giordano Hanlon (R, 2025; Ocean Township), Sheriff Shaun Golden (R, 2025; Howell Township) and Surrogate Rosemarie D. Peters (R, 2026; Middletown Township).

=== Politics ===
United States presidential election results for Keansburg
Year	Republican		Democratic		Third party(ies)	
Year	No.	%	No.	%	No.	%
2024	2,145	53.88%	1,778	44.66%	58	1.46%
2020	2,057	52.84%	1,778	45.67%	58	1.49%
2016	1,759	55.82%	1,303	41.35%	89	2.82%
2012	1,056	39.08%	1,604	59.36%	42	1.55%
2008	1,782	49.45%	1,769	49.08%	53	1.47%
2004	1,995	52.31%	1,783	46.75%	36	0.94%
2000	1,328	34.65%	2,347	61.23%	158	4.12%
1996	830	42.43%	717	36.66%	409	20.91%
1992	1,421	39.32%	1,352	37.41%	841	23.27%

As of March 2011, there were a total of 5,435 registered voters in Keansburg, of which 1,429 (26.3%) were registered as Democrats, 742 (13.7%) were registered as Republicans and 3,262 (60.0%) were registered as Unaffiliated. There were two voters registered as Libertarian or Green.

Gubernatorial election results for Keansburg
Year	Republican		Democratic		Third party(ies)	
Year	No.	%	No.	%	No.	%
2025	1,331	50.84%	1,269	48.47%	18	0.69%
2021	1,329	63.29%	743	35.38%	28	1.33%
2017	852	53.55%	700	44.00%	39	2.45%
2013	1,106	70.99%	426	27.34%	26	1.67%
2009	1,169	59.64%	643	32.81%	148	7.55%
2005	898	44.39%	956	47.26%	169	8.35%

In the 2012 presidential election, Democrat Barack Obama received 59.4% of the vote (1,604 cast), ahead of Republican Mitt Romney with 39.1% (1,056 votes), and other candidates with 1.6% (42 votes), among the 2,733 ballots cast by the borough's 5,673 registered voters (31 ballots were spoiled), for a turnout of 48.2%. In the 2008 presidential election, Republican John McCain received 48.5% of the vote (1,782 cast), ahead of Democrat Barack Obama with 48.1% (1,769 votes) and other candidates with 1.4% (53 votes), among the 3,677 ballots cast by the borough's 6,248 registered voters, for a turnout of 58.9%. In the 2004 presidential election, Republican George W. Bush received 52.1% of the vote (1,995 ballots cast), outpolling Democrat John Kerry with 46.6% (1,783 votes) and other candidates with 0.5% (36 votes), among the 3,827 ballots cast by the borough's 6,588 registered voters, for a turnout percentage of 58.1.

In the 2013 gubernatorial election, Republican Chris Christie received 71.0% of the vote (1,106 cast), ahead of Democrat Barbara Buono with 27.3% (426 votes), and other candidates with 1.7% (26 votes), among the 1,592 ballots cast by the borough's 5,368 registered voters (34 ballots were spoiled), for a turnout of 29.7%. In the 2009 gubernatorial election, Republican Chris Christie received 59.3% of the vote (1,169 ballots cast), ahead of Democrat Jon Corzine with 32.6% (643 votes), Independent Chris Daggett with 6.0% (118 votes) and other candidates with 1.5% (30 votes), among the 1,970 ballots cast by the borough's 5,738 registered voters, yielding a 34.3% turnout.

United States Senate election results for Keansburg1
Year	Republican		Democratic		Third party(ies)	
Year	No.	%	No.	%	No.	%
2024	1,837	53.71%	1,449	42.37%	134	3.92%
2018	1,095	52.27%	896	42.77%	104	4.96%
2012	1,151	46.22%	1,283	51.53%	56	2.25%
2006	787	45.84%	860	50.09%	70	4.08%

United States Senate election results for Keansburg2
Year	Republican		Democratic		Third party(ies)	
Year	No.	%	No.	%	No.	%
2020	1,876	49.32%	1,824	47.95%	104	2.73%
2014	467	44.82%	554	53.17%	21	2.02%
2013	419	51.35%	381	46.69%	16	1.96%
2008	1,331	42.80%	1,626	52.28%	153	4.92%

== Emergency services ==
The current Keansburg Police Department was created under an ordinance adopted in November 1926 which consisted of five members. The area known as Keansburg was under the authority of a Police Marshal prior to 1926. Before 1917, the area was patrolled by both Raritan Township (now Hazlet) and Middletown Township. The borough's first Police Marshal was James Gilligan, who was appointed in 1917 who served until his retirement in August 1943. The Chief of Police is Andrew Gogan.

Keansburg is served by two volunteer fire companies, Keansburg Fire Company No. 1 and New Point Comfort Fire Company No. 1.

Keansburg Fire Company #1, located on the corner of Main Street and Manning Place, was incorporated on October 13, 1912, making it the first fire company in the community.

New Point Comfort Volunteer Fire Company was organized in 1912 and incorporated on August 2, 1913 at the New Point Comfort Hotel located on Beachway Avenue. The company was first named the New Point Comfort Chemical Engine Company, and was later renamed the New Point Comfort Fire Company #1 in 1921. Having its first building on Oak Street, it later moved to a larger property at 192 Carr Avenue in 1959, where it is currently located.

The borough's two volunteer companies make up the Keansburg Fire Department, which was established in 1923. The chiefs of the two companies rotate as Chief and Assistant Chief of the Keansburg Fire Department. In even years the Chief of the Keansburg Fire Company #1 serves as Chief of the Keansburg Fire Department and the Chief of the New Point Comfort Volunteer Fire Company serving as Assistant Chief, while the roles are reversed in odd-numbered years.

In November 1998, the fire company established the Keansburg EMS and housed it on their property, where it is now a separate organization, responding to over 1,600 calls each year in only a one-square-mile area.

== Education ==
Students in pre-kindergarten through twelfth grade are served by the Keansburg School District. The district is one of 31 former Abbott districts statewide that were established pursuant to the decision by the New Jersey Supreme Court in Abbott v. Burke which are now referred to as "SDA Districts" based on the requirement for the state to cover all costs for school building and renovation projects in these districts under the supervision of the New Jersey Schools Development Authority. As of the 2023–24 school year, the district, comprised of four schools, had an enrollment of 1,565 students and 130.2 classroom teachers (on an FTE basis), for a student–teacher ratio of 12.0:1. Schools in the district (with 2023–24 enrollment data from the National Center for Education Statistics) are Keansburg Early Learning Center with 161 students in PreK, Joseph C. Caruso School with 638 students in grades K–4, Joseph R. Bolger Middle School with 347 students in grades 6–8 and Keansburg High School with 385 students in grades 9–12.

== Transportation ==
=== Roads and highways ===
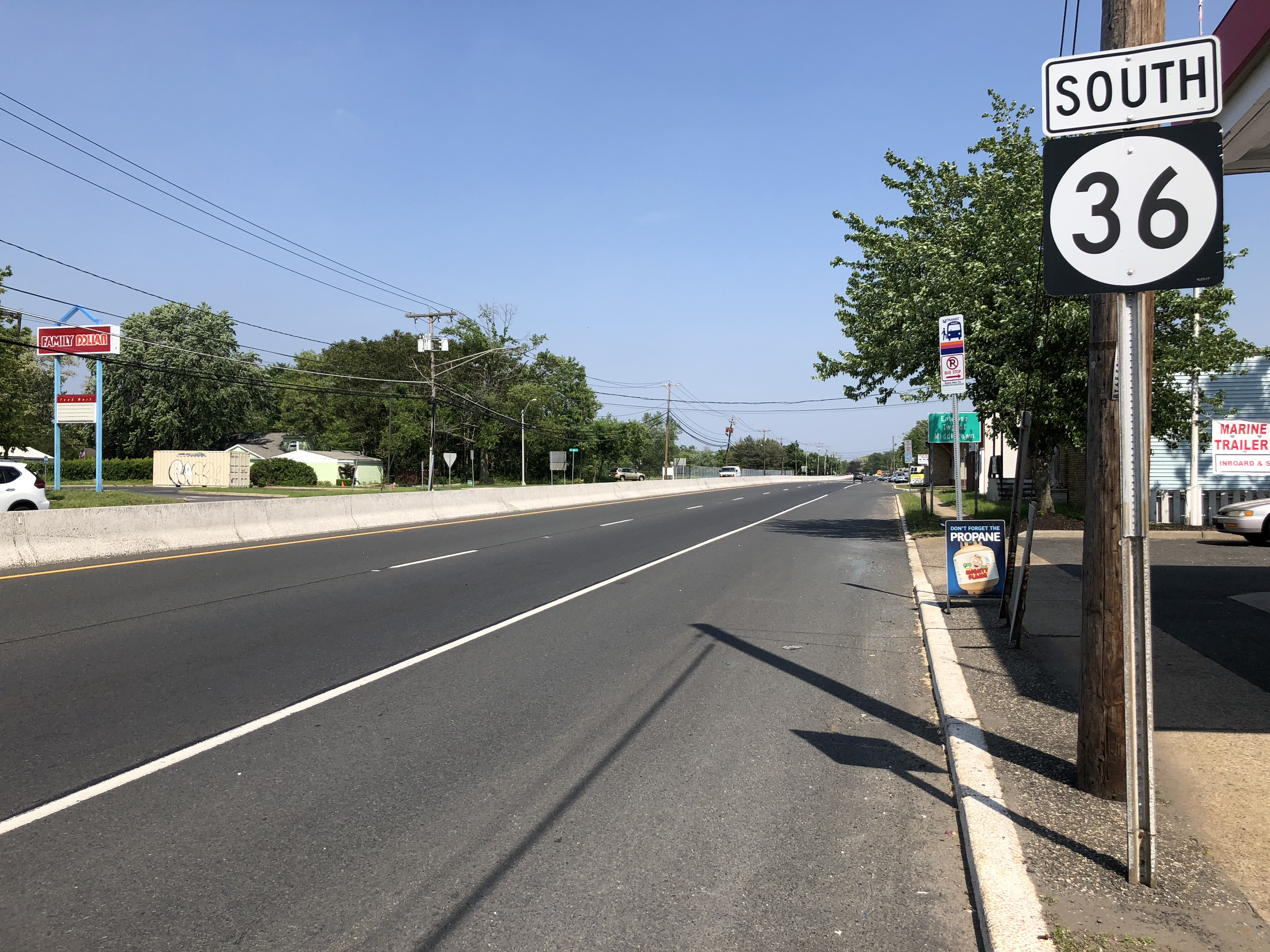
Route 36 on the south side of Keansburg

As of May 2010, the borough had a total of 27.53 miles (44.31 km) of roadways, of which 25.00 miles (40.23 km) were maintained by the municipality, 2.41 miles (3.88 km) by Monmouth County and 0.12 miles (0.19 km) by the New Jersey Department of Transportation.

Route 36 runs along the borough's southern border. The Garden State Parkway is accessible via Route 36 in neighboring Hazlet.

=== Public transportation ===
NJ Transit offers local bus service on the 817 route.

== Notable people ==
People who were born in, residents of, or otherwise closely associated with Keansburg include:

- Eugene J. Bedell (1928–2016), politician who served in the New Jersey General Assembly from 1972 to 1982
- James Coonan (born 1946), leader of the Irish gang known as the Westies
- Ken Croken (born 1950), member of the Iowa House of Representatives
- Frank H. Field (1922–2013), chemist and mass spectrometrist known for his work in the development of chemical ionization
- James P. Maher (1865–1946), New York City Congressman from 1911 to 1921 who was elected Mayor of Keansburg in 1926
- Jason Mewes (born 1974), actor primarily known for his role as Jay, of the duo Jay and Silent Bob, in films directed by longtime friend, Kevin Smith
- John Montefusco (born 1950), ex-major league baseball player who played for the New York Yankees
- Donald Nash (1935–2016), criminal, who in 1982 committed two murders for hire and also killed three bystanders, and later killed a fellow prison inmate
- Lou Taylor Pucci (born 1985), actor
- Horace M. Thorne (1918–1944), awarded the Medal of Honor for valor during World War II
- Roger "Hurricane" Wilson (born 1963), electric blues guitarist, singer and songwriter

Preceded by Union Beach	Beaches of New Jersey	Succeeded by Sandy Hook

== Sources ==
- Gabrielan, Randall. Images of America: Keansburg, Arcadia Publishing, 1997. ISBN 0738538361.
