= Keansburg Firemen's Memorial Park =

Coordinates: 40.45186°N 74.13263°W

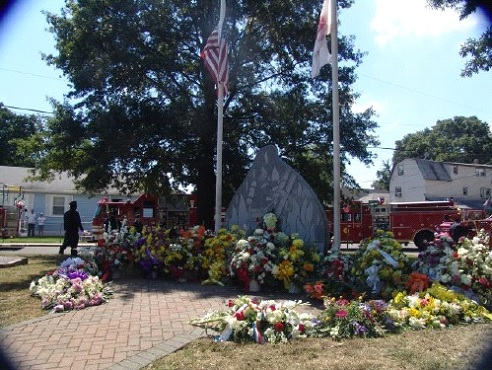

Keansburg Firefighter's Memorial Park, located on Center and Fox Avenues in Keansburg, New Jersey, was dedicated on Memorial Day, May 30, 1938.

Services were led by Captain Waldo Weller, Chaplain of the 16th Infantry Regiment on Governors Island, NY.

The property was donated to the borough by William A. Gehlhaus. Bronze markers were erected for members who had died.

On July 4, 1955, services were held for the Free World Volunteer Firemen with a Massing of the Colors and a salute by the Fort Monmouth Rifle Squad.
