= Herschel F. Briles =

United States Army Medal of Honor recipient (1914–1994)

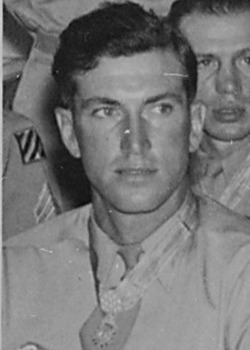
- Herschel Briles after receiving his Medal of Honor from President Harry S. Truman on August 23, 1945
- Born: Herschel Floyd Briles; February 7, 1914; Colfax, Iowa
- Died: July 17, 1994 (aged 80); Mitchellville, Iowa
- Burial place: Waveland Cemetery, Prairie City, Iowa
- Military career
- Allegiance: United States of America
- Branch: United States Army
- Service years: 1941 - 1945
- Rank: First Sergeant
- Unit: 899th Tank Destroyer Battalion
- Conflicts: World War II
- Awards: Medal of Honor

Herschel Floyd Briles (February 7, 1914 – July 17, 1994) was a United States Army soldier and a recipient of the United States military's highest decoration—the Medal of Honor—for his actions in World War II.

== Biography ==
Briles was born in Colfax, Iowa, the son of Ida Ellen (Gouty) and William Henry Briles. He joined the Army from Fort Des Moines, Iowa on his 27th birthday, and by November 20, 1944, was serving as a staff sergeant in Company C, 899th Tank Destroyer Battalion. On that day, near Scherpenseel, Germany, he left cover to rescue the wounded crew of a burning tank destroyer and extinguish the vehicle's flames. The next day, he single-handedly forced the surrender of fifty-five German soldiers and again left cover to reach a burning tank destroyer, rescue its crew, and put out the flames. For these actions, he was awarded the Medal of Honor ten months later, on September 10, 1945.

Briles reached the rank of first sergeant before leaving the Army in June 1945.

== Death and burial ==
He died at age 80 and was buried in Waveland Cemetery, Prairie City, Iowa.

== Medal of Honor citation ==
Briles' official Medal of Honor citation reads:

He was leading a platoon of destroyers across an exposed slope near Scherpenseel, Germany, on 20 November 1944, when they came under heavy enemy artillery fire. A direct hit was scored on 1 of the vehicles, killing 1 man, seriously wounding 2 others, and setting the destroyer afire. With a comrade, S/Sgt. Briles left the cover of his own armor and raced across ground raked by artillery and small-arms fire to the rescue of the men in the shattered destroyer. Without hesitation, he lowered himself into the burning turret, removed the wounded and then extinguished the fire. From a position he assumed the next morning, he observed hostile infantrymen advancing. With his machinegun, he poured such deadly fire into the enemy ranks that an entire pocket of 55 Germans surrendered, clearing the way for a junction between American units which had been held up for 2 days. Later that day, when another of his destroyers was hit by a concealed enemy tank, he again left protection to give assistance. With the help of another soldier, he evacuated two wounded under heavy fire and, returning to the burning vehicle, braved death from exploding ammunition to put out the flames. By his heroic initiative and complete disregard for personal safety, S/Sgt. Briles was largely responsible for causing heavy enemy casualties, forcing the surrender of 55 Germans, making possible the salvage of our vehicles, and saving the lives of wounded comrades.

== Awards and decorations ==

| 1st row | Medal of Honor Bronze Star Medal | | |
| 2nd row | Purple Heart | Army Good Conduct Medal | American Defense Service Medal |
| 3rd row | American Campaign Medal | European–African–Middle Eastern Campaign Medal with 1 Campaign Star | World War II Victory Medal |
| Unit awards | Presidential Unit Citation | | |

== See also ==
- List of Medal of Honor recipients
- List of Medal of Honor recipients for World War II
