= Horace M. Thorne =

Horace Marvin Thorne
- Born: September 29, 1918; Keansburg, New Jersey, US
- Died: December 21, 1944 (aged 26) near Grufflingen, Belgium
- Burial place: Fair View Cemetery, Middletown Township, New Jersey
- Military career
- Allegiance: United States
- Branch: United States Army
- Service years: 1941 - 1944
- Rank: Corporal
- Nickname: "Buddy"
- Units: 89th Cavalry Reconnaissance Squadron, 9th Armored Division
- Conflicts: World War II
- Awards: Medal of Honor; Purple Heart; Croix de guerre (Belgium)

Horace Marvin "Buddy" Thorne (September 29, 1918 – December 21, 1944) was a United States Army soldier and a recipient of the United States military's highest decoration—the Medal of Honor—for his actions in World War II.

== Early life ==
Born in Keansburg, New Jersey, Thorne grew up on a 53-acre (0.21 km^{2}) farm in the nearby North Middletown section of Middletown Township. He and his eight siblings attended Port Monmouth Elementary School and Leonardo High School.

== Career ==
Thorne joined the Army from Keyport, New Jersey, in March 1941. One of his friends in his unit, Sgt. Lindel Pinson, invited Cpl. Thorne on weekend leaves where he met Leah Pinson who became his wife on March 3, 1944. His unit left for Europe in August and by December 21, 1944, was serving as a corporal in Troop D, 89th Cavalry Reconnaissance Squadron, 9th Armored Division. On that day, near Grufflingen (now part of Burg-Reuland), in Belgium, he voluntarily took up an exposed position on top of a destroyed tank in order to better fire on the German forces. His brother-in-law Sgt. Lindel Pinson, who witnessed his heroism that day, tried unsuccessfully to call him back to a dug-in position. He killed several Germans and scattered the crews of two enemy machine-gun nests before being killed himself. He was posthumously awarded the Medal of Honor nine months later, on September 19, 1945.

== Legacy ==
Thorne, aged 26 at his death, was originally buried in a Belgian forest. His remains were later returned home and interred at Fair View Cemetery in Middletown, New Jersey. His widow died in 2002.

Thorne Middle School in Middletown was named in his honor in the 1960s; the school is home to a display which includes photographs of Thorne, his Medal of Honor, and the original award citation.

Corporal Thorne's official Medal of Honor citation reads:

He was the leader of a combat patrol on 21 December 1944 near Grufflingen, Belgium, with the mission of driving German forces from dug-in positions in a heavily wooded area. As he advanced his light machinegun, a German Mark III tank emerged from the enemy position and was quickly immobilized by fire from American light tanks supporting the patrol. Two of the enemy tankmen attempted to abandon their vehicle but were killed by Cpl. Thorne's shots before they could jump to the ground. To complete the destruction of the tank and its crew, Cpl. Thorne left his covered position and crept forward alone through intense machinegun fire until close enough to toss 2 grenades into the tank's open turret, killing 2 more Germans. He returned across the same fire-beaten zone as heavy mortar fire began falling in the area, seized his machinegun and, without help, dragged it to the knocked-out tank and set it up on the vehicle's rear deck. He fired short rapid bursts into the enemy positions from his advantageous but exposed location, killing or wounding 8. Two enemy machinegun crews abandoned their positions and retreated in confusion. His gun jammed; but rather than leave his self-chosen post he attempted to clear the stoppage; enemy small-arms fire, concentrated on the tank, killed him instantly. Cpl. Thorne, displaying heroic initiative and intrepid fighting qualities, inflicted costly casualties on the enemy and insured the success of his patrol's mission by the sacrifice of his life.

Note that many soldiers called the Panzerkampfwagen III simply a "Mark III", which to the reader can confuse it with the British Mark III from World War I.

== See also ==
- List of Medal of Honor recipients for World War II
