= Gannon v. Kansas =

Gannon v. Kansas was a case brought before the Kansas Supreme Court that focused on the funding of K-12 public education by the state. In 2010, several school districts initiated legal action against the State of Kansas, alleging that the State failed to provide equitable and sufficient funding for public education, in violation of Article 6 of the Kan. Const. art. VI, 6(b). The trial began in 2012.

A three-judge panel initially ruled that the State's School District Finance and Quality Performance Act (SDFQPA) did not comply with the constitutional requirements for both equity and adequacy. On appeal, the Kansas Supreme Court agreed with the panel's equity finding but disagreed with its adequacy finding, stating that the wrong standard was applied.

After further review, the panel found both the SDFQPA and its replacement, the Classroom Learning Assuring Student Success Act (CLASS), to be in violation of the constitutional requirements for adequacy. The Kansas Supreme Court upheld this decision. To address the issue, the Court ordered a stay and mandated that the state demonstrate by June 30, 2017, that any new public education financing system enacted by the legislature would comply with Article 6. Failure to comply would result in the State's education financing system being declared unconstitutional and void.

Throughout the course of the legal proceedings, the Court has repeatedly ruled that the Kansas Legislature has inadequately and inequitably funded public schools in violation of Article 6 of the Kansas Constitution.
