= District Factor Group =

Indicator of socioeconomic status of citizens in school districts of New Jersey

Membership in a District Factor Group (DFG) is an indicator of the socioeconomic status of citizens in school districts of New Jersey. DFGs were first developed by the New Jersey Department of Education in 1975 for the purpose of comparing student performance on statewide assessments across demographically similar school districts. The categories are updated every ten years when the United States Census Bureau releases the data from each new census.

Since the DFGs were created, they have been used for purposes other than analyzing test score performance, including their role in determining the initial group of districts that were classified as Abbott Districts. Additionally, subsequent to the Abbott IV court ruling, the DFGs were also used to define the group of school districts which would receive Abbott v. Burke parity remedy aid.

The DFGs represent an approximate measure of a community’s relative socioeconomic status (SES). The classification system provides a useful tool for examining student achievement and comparing similarly situated school districts in other analyses. The DFGs do not have a primary or significant influence in the school funding formula beyond the legal requirements associated with parity aid provided to the Abbott districts.

In updating the DFGs using the data from the 2000 Census, efforts were made to improve the methodology while preserving the underlying meaning of the DFG classification system. Based on discussions with representatives from school districts and experimenting with various methods, the DFGs were calculated using the following six variables that have been found to be most closely related to SES:

1. Percent of adults with no high school diploma
2. Percent of adults with some college education
3. Occupational status
4. Unemployment rate
5. Percent of individuals in poverty
6. Median family income.

== DFG categories ==
School districts in New Jersey are categorized into District Factor Groups, which describe the socioeconomic characteristics of the local district. From lowest socioeconomic status to highest, the categories are A, B, CD, DE, FG, GH, I and J. Of the 549 districts statewide, the latest District Factor Groups categorized using data from the United States Census 2000 (with some updated information) breakdown as follows:

- A: 39
- B: 67
- CD: 67
- DE: 83
- FG: 89
- GH: 76
- I: 103
- J: 25
