= Asbury Park, New Jersey =

City in Monmouth County, New Jersey, US

- City
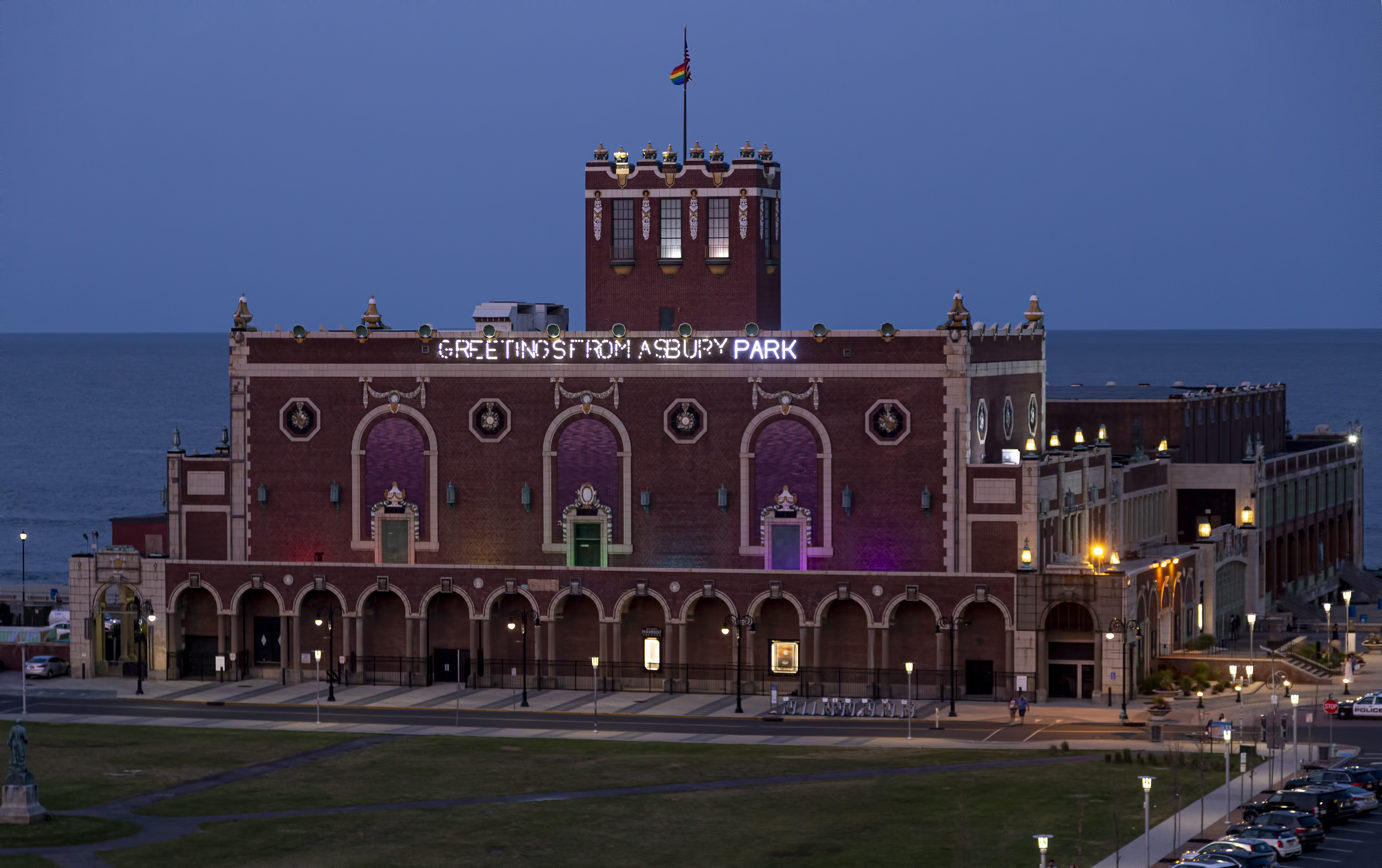
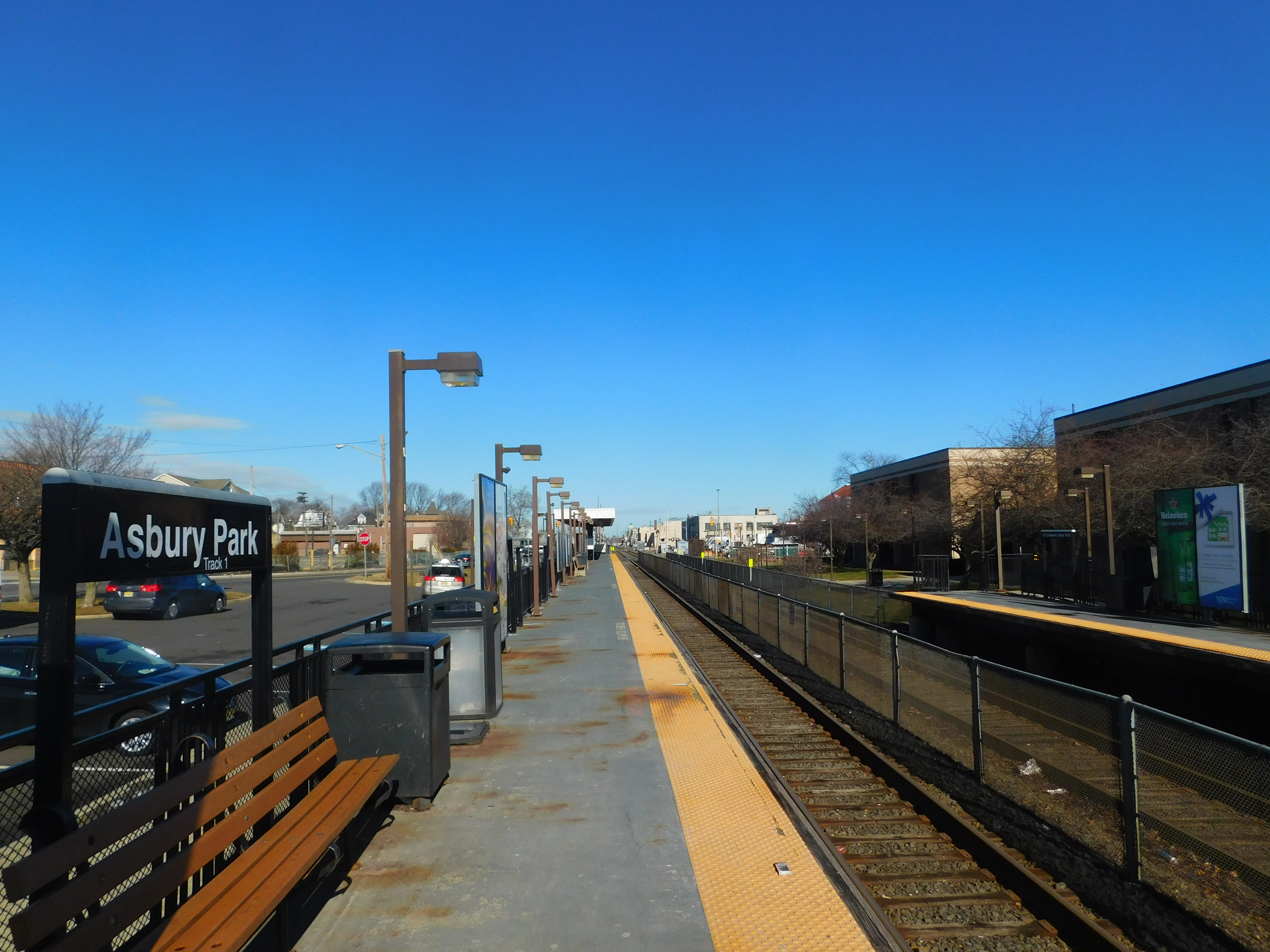
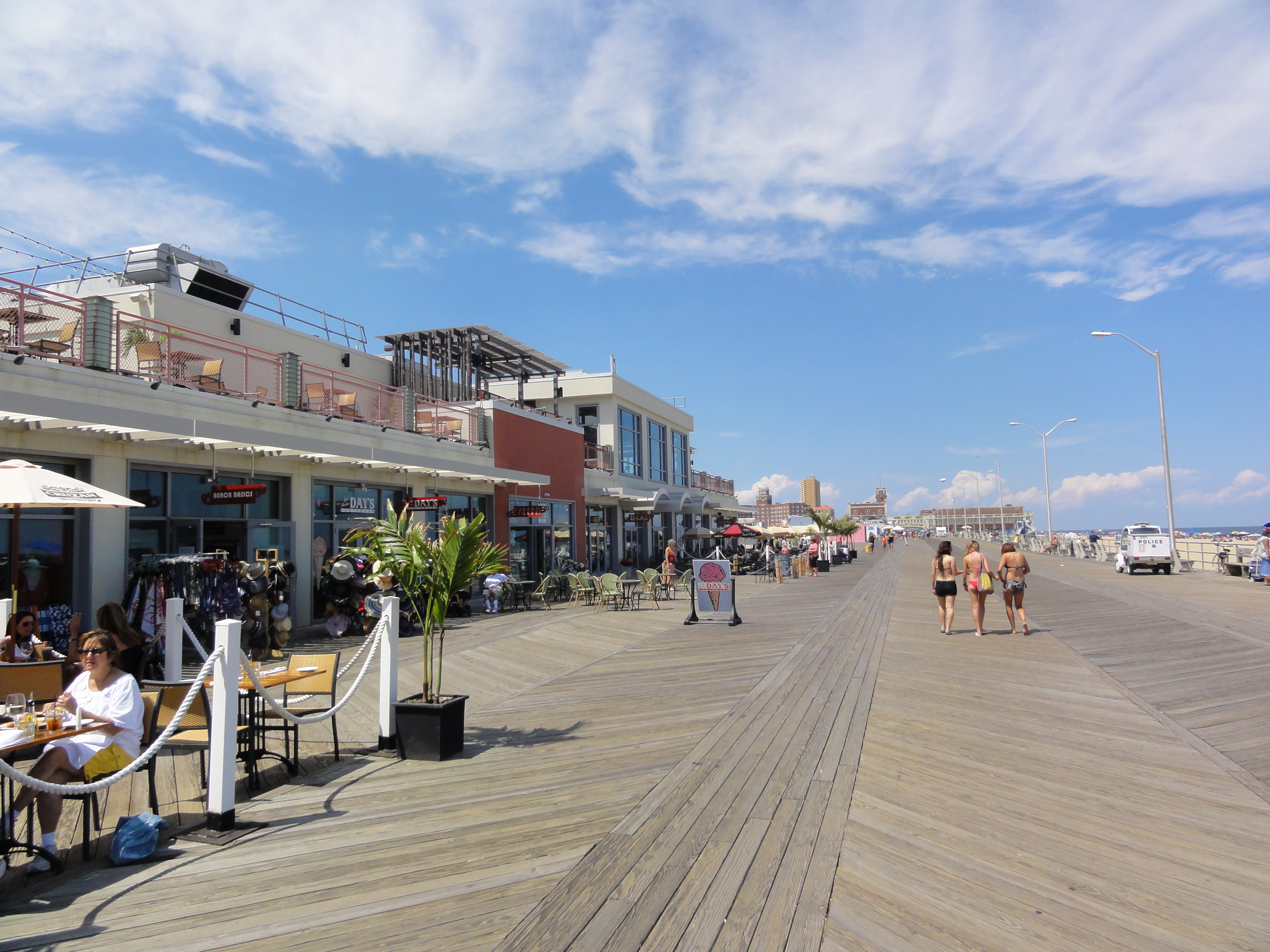
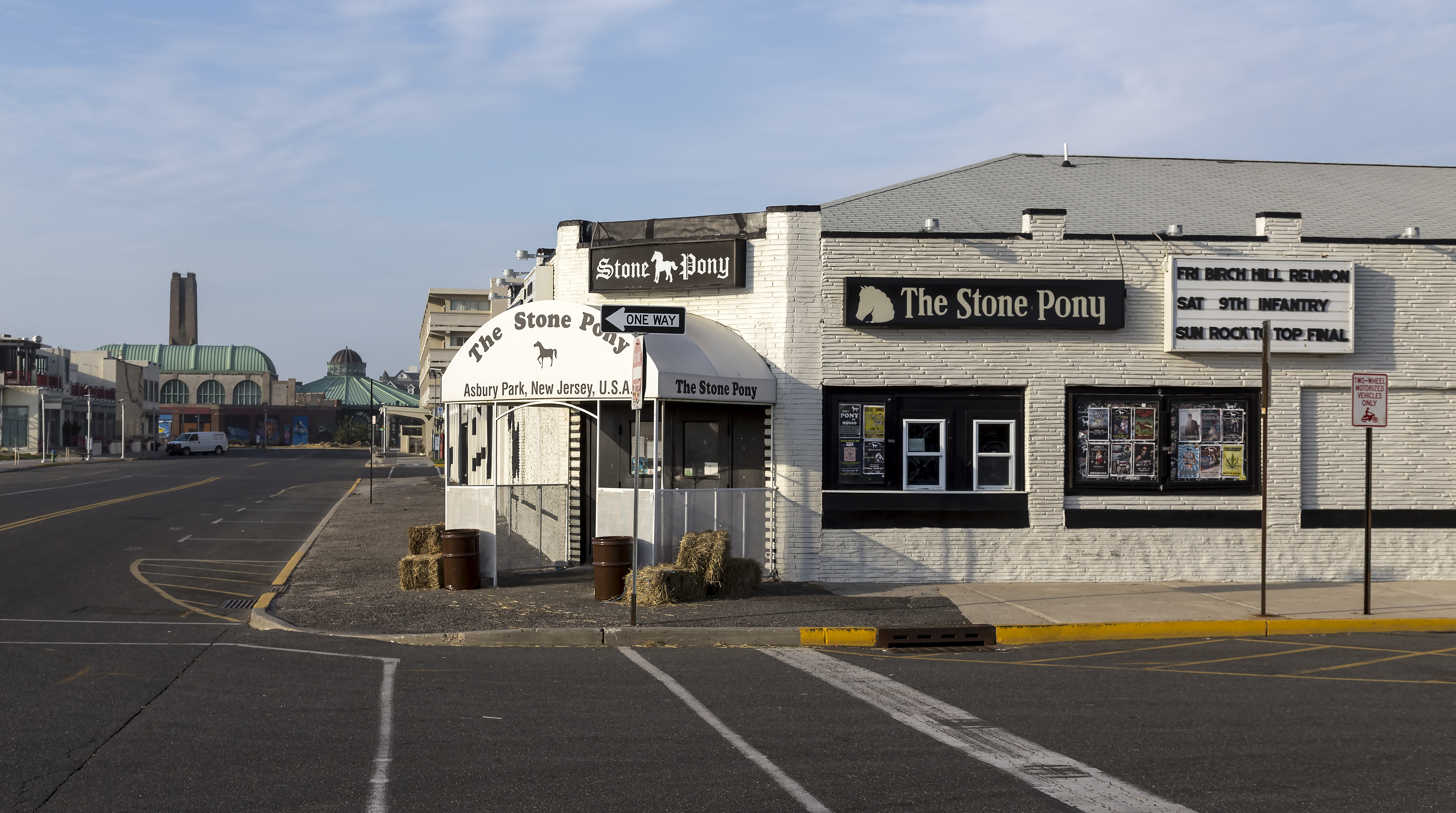
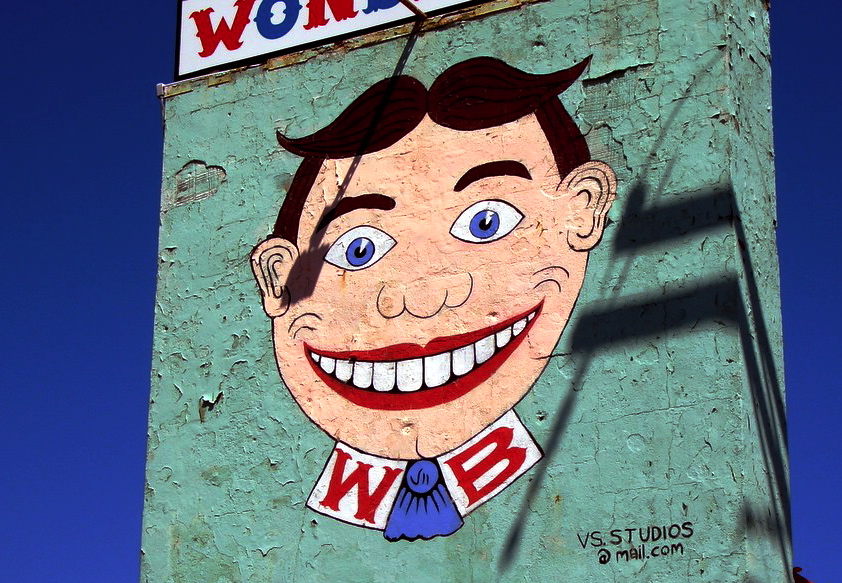
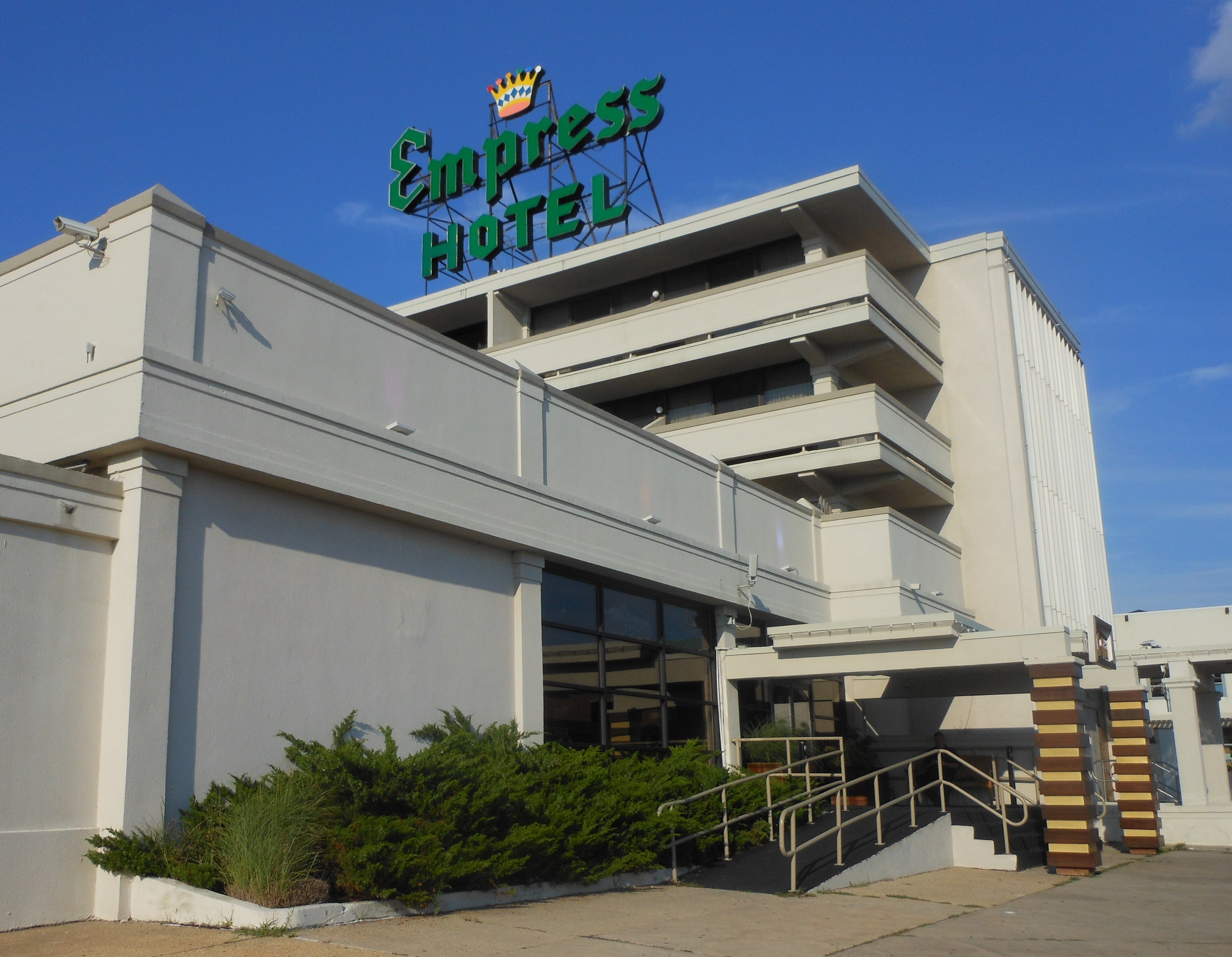
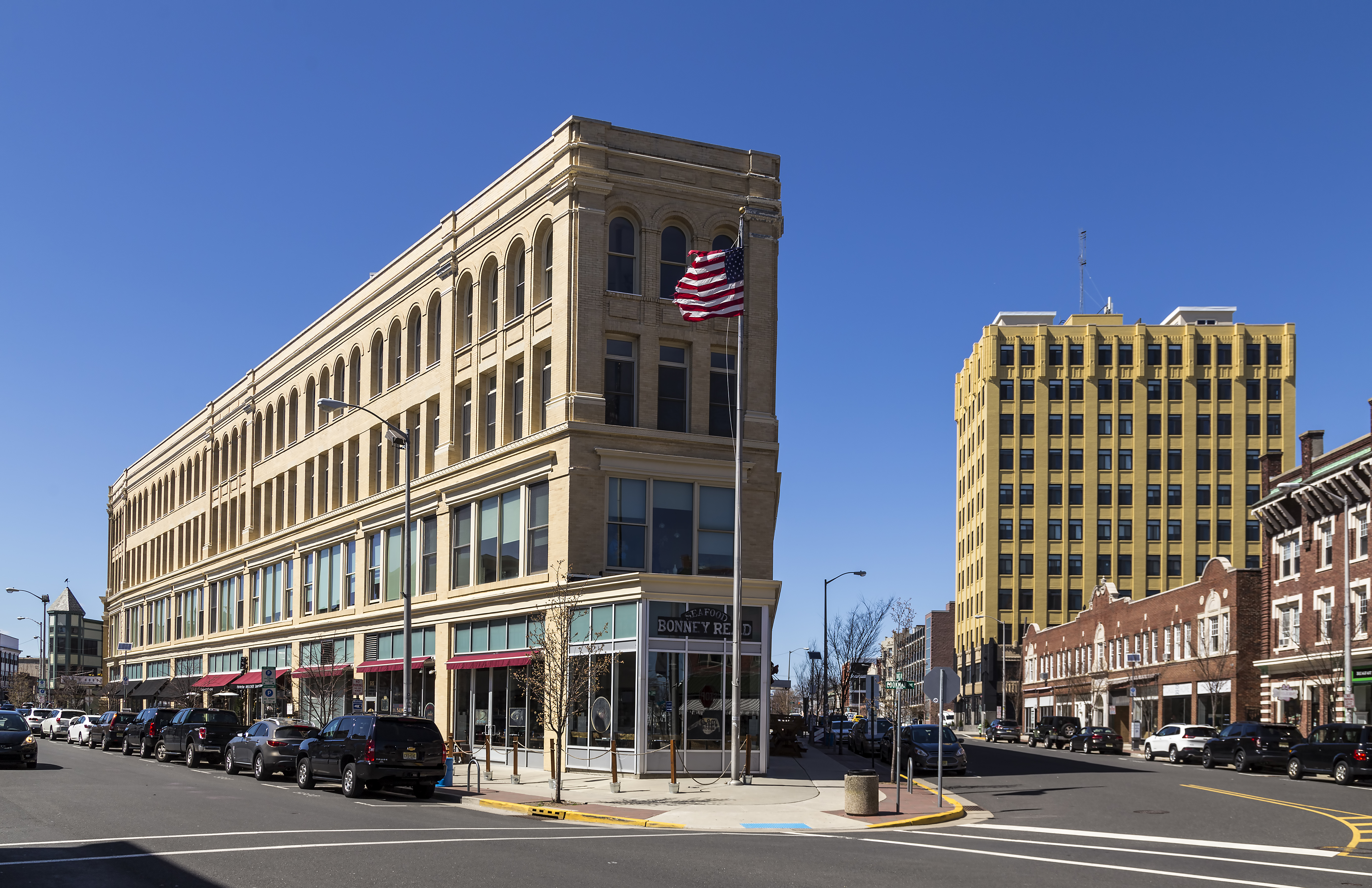
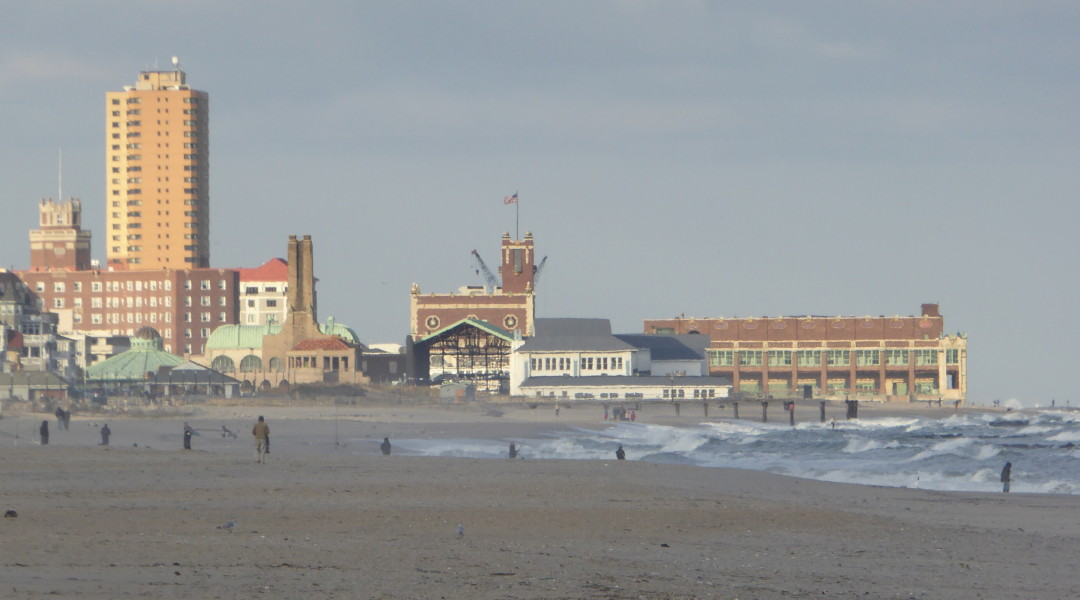
- Paramount Theatre and Asbury Park Convention Hall at nightfall, June 2019 Asbury Park station, 2018 Asbury's famous Boardwalk, 2012 The Stone Pony, 2016 Tillie replica on the Wonder Bar, 2006 The Empress Hotel, 2013 Steinbach-Cookman Building at the heart of Downtown Asbury Park, 2016 Skyline of Asbury Park from the beach, 2013

- Seal
- Nickname: The Dark City
- Location of Asbury Park in Monmouth County highlighted in red (left). Inset map: Location of Monmouth County in New Jersey highlighted in orange (right).
- Interactive map of Asbury Park, New Jersey
- Location in Monmouth County Location in New Jersey Location in the United States
- Coordinates: 40.222884°N 74.010232°W
- Country: United States
- State: New Jersey
- County: Monmouth
- Incorporated: March 26, 1874 (as borough)
- Reincorporated: February 28, 1897 (as city)
- Named for: Francis Asbury

Government
  - Type: Faulkner Act (council–manager)
  - Body: City Council
  - Mayor: John B. Moor (term ends December 31, 2026)
  - Manager: Adam Cruz
  - Municipal clerk: Lisa Esposito

Area
  - Total: 1.61 sq mi (4.17 km^{2})
  - Land: 1.43 sq mi (3.70 km^{2})
  - Water: 0.18 sq mi (0.47 km^{2}) 11.18%
  - Rank: 439th of 565 in state 36th of 53 in county
- Elevation: 16 ft (4.9 m)

Population (2020)
  - Total: 15,188
  - Estimate (2023): 15,391
  - Rank: 173rd of 565 in state 14th of 53 in county
  - Density: 10,628.4/sq mi (4,103.6/km^{2})
  - Rank: 36th of 565 in state 2nd of 53 in county
- Time zone: UTC−05:00 (Eastern (EST))
  - Summer (DST): UTC−04:00 (Eastern (EDT))
- ZIP Codes: 07712–07713
- Area codes: 732
- FIPS code: 3402501960
- GNIS feature ID: 0885141
- Website: www.cityofasburypark.com

Asbury Park (/æzbɛri/) is a beachfront city located on the Jersey Shore in Monmouth County in the U.S. state of New Jersey. It is part of the New York metropolitan area. As of the 2020 United States census, the city's population was 15,188, a decrease of 5.8% from the 2010 census count of 16,116, which in turn reflected a decline of 4.8% from the 16,930 in the 2000 census.

In 2022, Asbury Park's beach was named one of the best in the world by Money and one of the best in the country by Travel + Leisure.

Asbury Park was originally incorporated as a borough by an act of the New Jersey Legislature on March 26, 1874, from portions of Ocean Township. The borough was reincorporated on February 28, 1893. Asbury Park was incorporated as a city, its current type of government, as of March 25, 1897.

== History ==
=== Early years ===
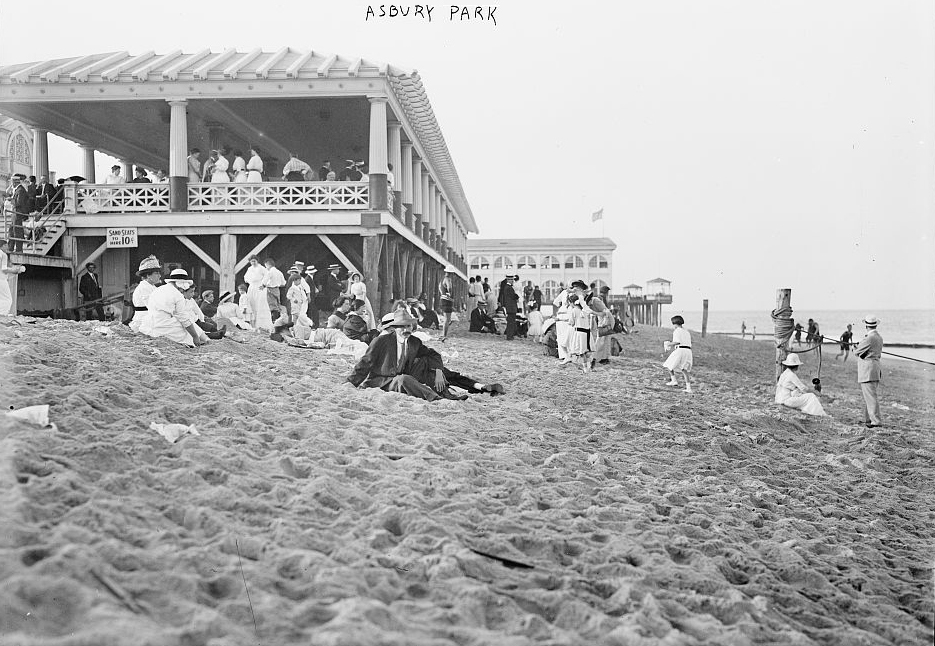
Asbury Park beach, early twentieth century

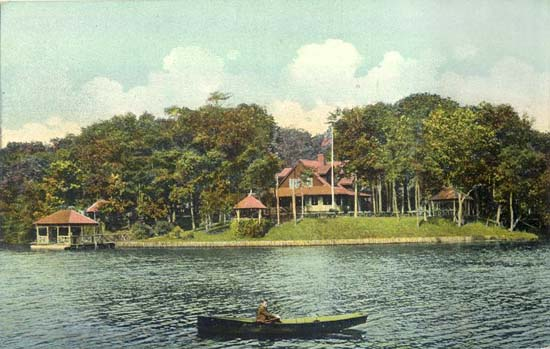
Ross-Fenton Farm, c. 1900

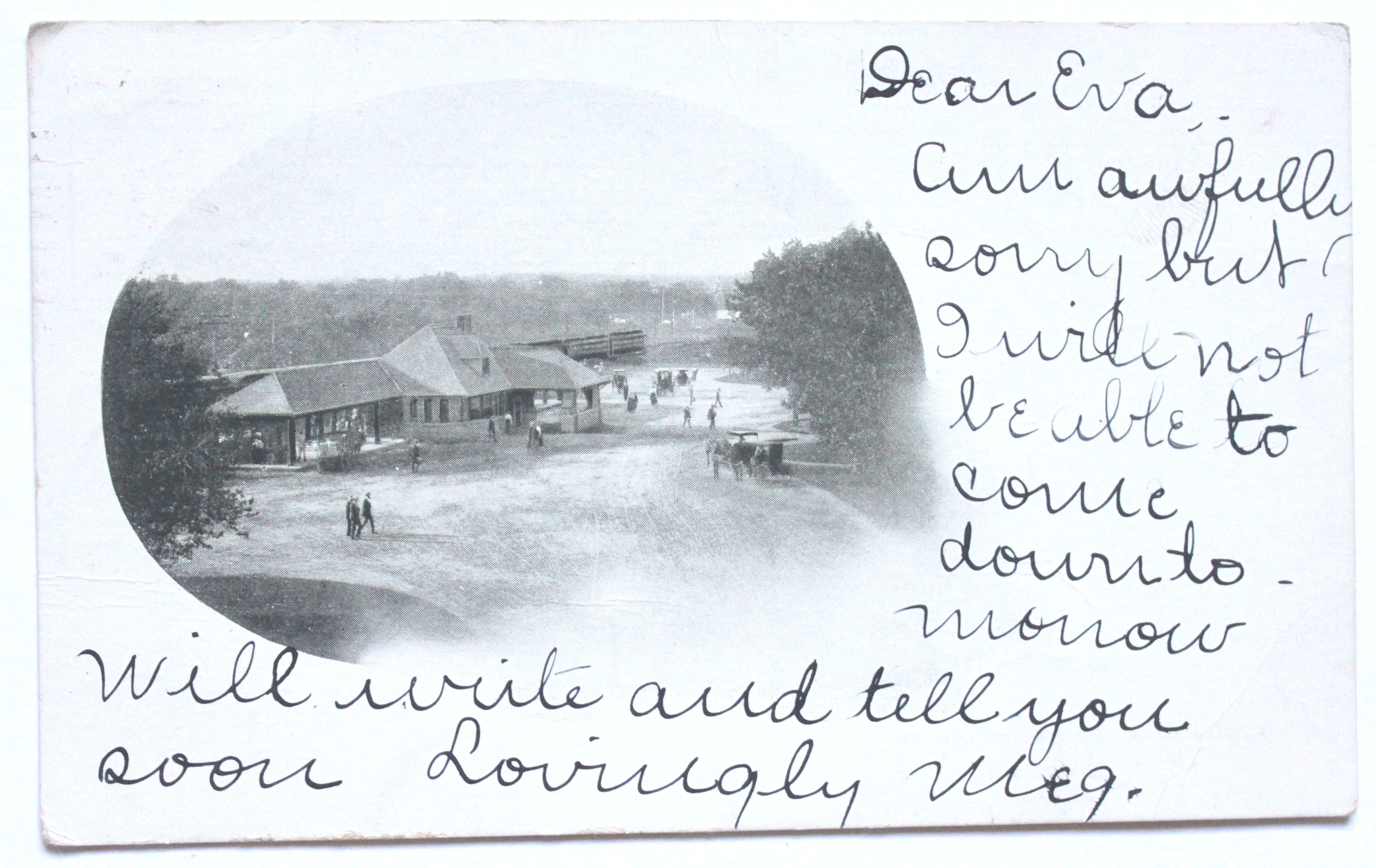
Asbury Park, New Jersey Depot Station in 1903

A seaside community, Asbury Park is located on New Jersey's central coast. Developed in 1871 as a residential resort by New York brush manufacturer James A. Bradley, the city was named for Francis Asbury, the first American bishop of the Methodist Episcopal Church in the United States. The founding of Ocean Grove in 1869, a Methodist camp meeting to the south, encouraged the development of Asbury Park and led to its being a "dry town".

Bradley was active in the development of much of the city's infrastructure, and despite his preference for gas light, he allowed the Atlantic Coast Electric Company (precursor to today's Jersey Central Power & Light) to offer electric service. Along the waterfront, Bradley installed the Asbury Park Boardwalk, an orchestra pavilion, public changing rooms, and a pier at the south end of that boardwalk. Such success attracted other businessmen. In 1888, Ernest Schnitzler built the Palace Merry-Go-Round on the southwest corner of Lake Avenue and Kingsley Street, the cornerstone of what would become the Palace Amusements complex; other attractions followed. During these early decades in Asbury Park, a number of grand hotels were built, including the Plaza Hotel.

Uriah White, an Asbury Park pioneer, installed the first artesian well water system. As many as 600,000 people a year vacationed in Asbury Park during the summer season in the early years, riding the New York and Long Branch Railroad from New York City and Philadelphia to enjoy the mile-and-a-quarter stretch of oceanfront Asbury Park. By 1912, The New York Times estimated that the summer population could reach 200,000, some 20 times the city's year-round population.

The "country by the sea" destination experienced several key periods of popularity. The first notable era was the 1890s, marked by a housing growth, examples of which can still be found today in a full range of Victorian architecture. Coinciding with the nationwide trend in retail shopping, Asbury Park's downtown flourished during this period and well into the 20th century.

=== 1920s and modern development ===
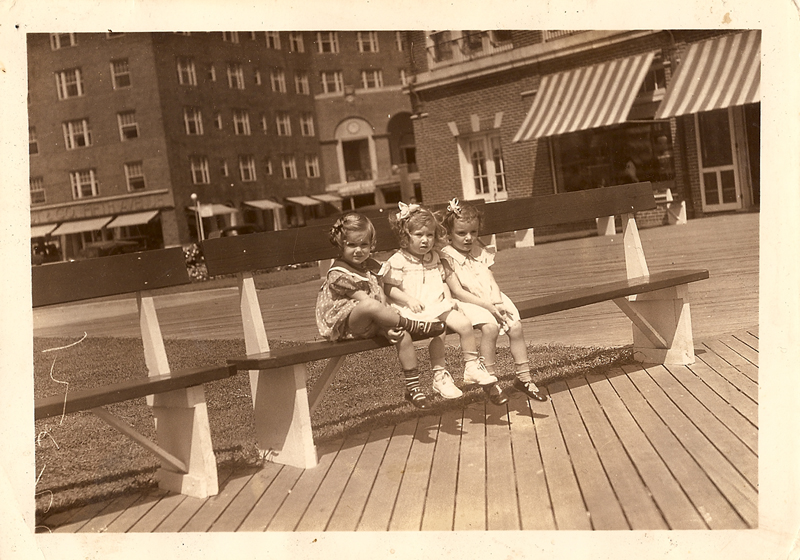
Asbury Park boardwalk, c. 1935

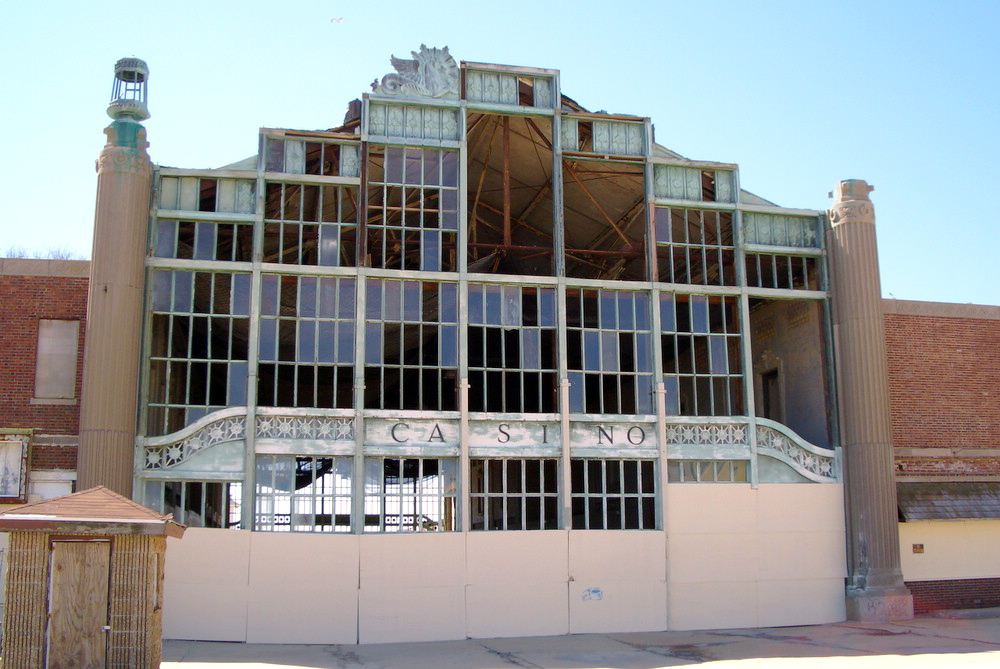
The casino's boarded walkway that links Asbury Park to Ocean Grove

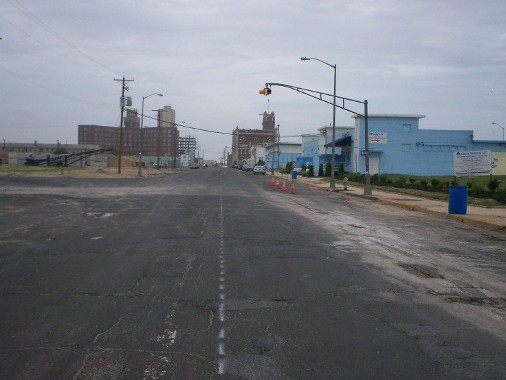
Vacant streets were a common sight in the 1980s and 1990s.

==== 1920s ====
In the 1920s, Paramount Theatre and Convention Hall complex, the Casino Arena and Carousel House, and two red-brick pavilions were built in the Asbury Boardwalk area. Beaux Arts architect Whitney Warren of New York was the designer. He had also been hired to design the Berkeley-Carteret Hotel located diagonally across from the theater and hall. At the same time, Asbury Park High School was constructed, overlooking Deal Lake.

==== 1930s ====
On September 8, 1934, the wreck of the ocean liner SS Morro Castle, which caught fire and burned, beached itself near the city just yards away from the Asbury Park Convention Hall; the city capitalized on the event, turning the wreck into a tourist attraction.

In 1935, the newly founded Securities and Exchange Commission (SEC) called Asbury Park's Mayor Clarence F. Hetrick to testify about $6 million in "beach improvement bonds" that had gone into default. At the same time, the SEC also inquired about rental rates on the beach front and why the mayor reduced the lease of a bathhouse from $85,000 to $40,000, among many other discrepancies that could have offset debt. The interests of Asbury Park's bond investors led Senator Frank Durand (Monmouth County) to add a last-minute "Beach Commission" amendment to a municipal debt bill in the New Jersey Legislature. When the bill became law, it ceded control of the Asbury Park beach to Governor Harold Hoffman and a governor's commission. The city of Asbury Park sued to restore control of the beach to the municipal council, but the New Jersey Court of Errors and Appeals (until 1947, the state's highest court) upheld the validity of the law in 1937. When Durand pressed New Jersey's legislature to extend the state's control of Asbury Park's beach in 1938, the lower house staged a walk out and the Senate soon adjourned, a disruption that also prevented a vote for funding New Jersey's participation in the 1939 New York World's Fair. In December 1938, the court returned control of the beach to the municipal council under the proviso that a bond repayment agreement was created; Asbury Park was the only beach in New Jersey affected by the Beach Commission law. Extensive and lush floral plantings were present in Asbury Park's Bradley Park during the 1930s, as can be seen in archival footage.

==== 1940s ====
In 1943, the New York Yankees held their spring training in Asbury Park instead of Florida. This was because rail transport had to be conserved during the war, and Major League Baseball's spring training was limited to an area east of the Mississippi River and north of the Ohio River.

With the opening of the Garden State Parkway in 1947, Asbury Park saw the travel market change, as fewer vacationers took trains to the seashore. While the Asbury Park exit on the Parkway opened in 1956 and provided a means for drivers to reach Asbury Park more easily, additional exits further south allowed drivers access to new alternative vacation destinations, particularly on Long Beach Island.

==== 1950s and beyond ====
In the decades that followed the war, surrounding farm communities gave way to tracts of suburban houses, encouraging the city's middle-class blacks as well as whites to move into newer houses with spacious yards.

With the above-mentioned change in the travel market, prompted by the opening of the Garden State Parkway in 1947 and the opening of Monmouth Mall 10 miles (16 km) away in Eatontown in 1960, Asbury Park's downtown became less of an attraction to shoppers. Office parks built outside the city resulted in the relocation of accountants, dentists, doctors, lawyers, and other professionals. Moreover, the opening of Great Adventure (on July 1, 1974), a combination theme park and drive-through safari located on a lake in Jackson Township—and close to a New Jersey Turnpike exit—proved to be stiff competition for a mile-long stretch of aging boardwalk amusements.

On June 20, 1956, Linea Aeropostal Venezolana Flight 253 crashed off Asbury Park, killing all 74 people on board in what was the deadliest accident involving a scheduled commercial flight at the time.

Race riots that broke out in the city on July 4, 1970, resulted in the destruction of aging buildings along Springwood Avenue, one of three main east–west corridors into Asbury Park and the central shopping and entertainment district for those living in the city's southwest quadrant. Many of those city blocks have yet to be redeveloped into the 21st century.

Although it was placed on the National Register of Historic Places, Palace Amusements was closed in 1988 and was demolished in 2004 despite attempts to save it. The complex had featured the famous face of Tillie, a symbol of the Jersey Shore.

In 1990, the carousel at the Casino Pier was sold to Family Kingdom Amusement Park in Myrtle Beach, South Carolina, where it continues to operate.

=== 21st century ===
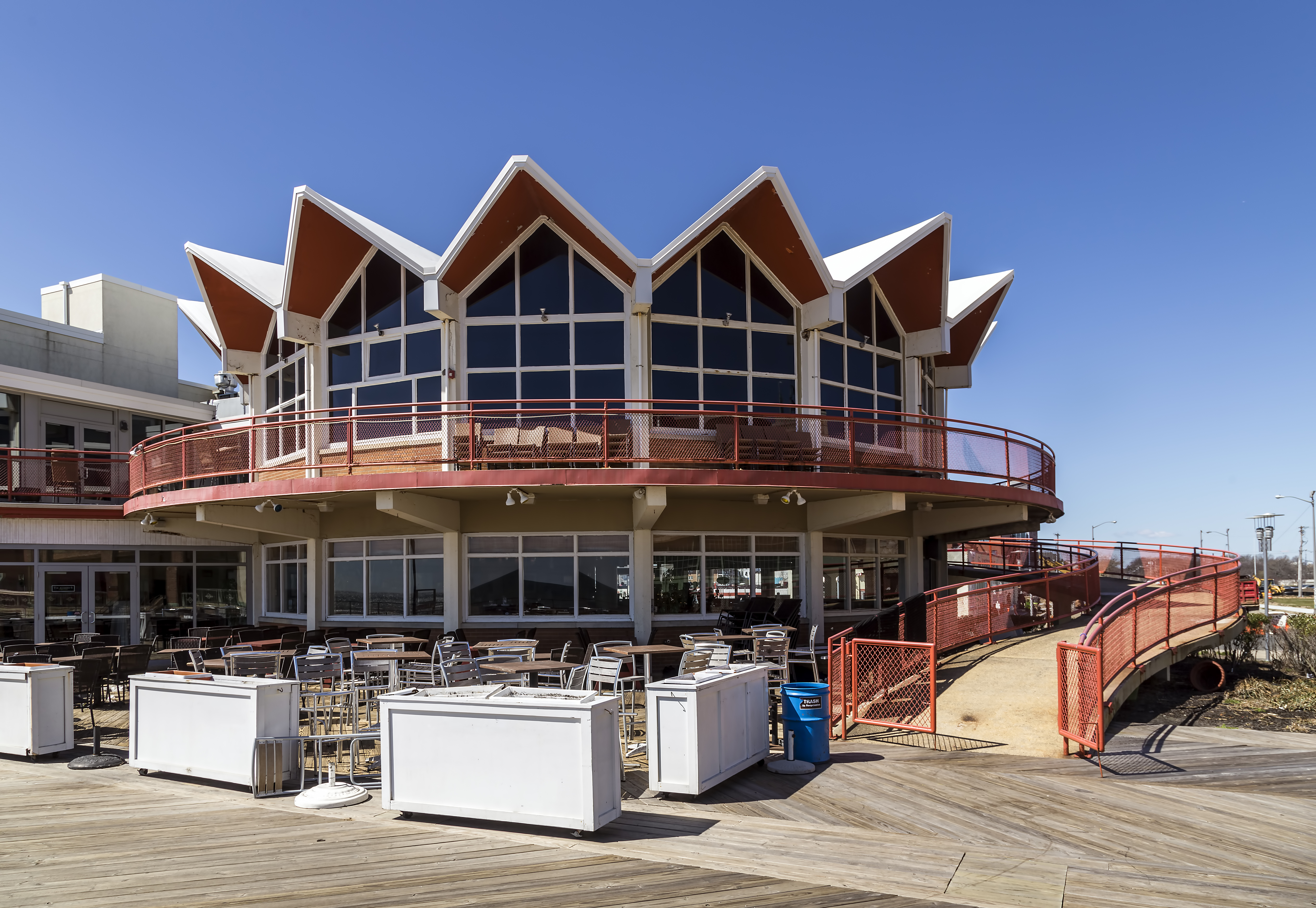
Former Howard Johnson's renovated and reopened in summer 2007 as Salt Water Beach Cafe on the boardwalk in Asbury Park.

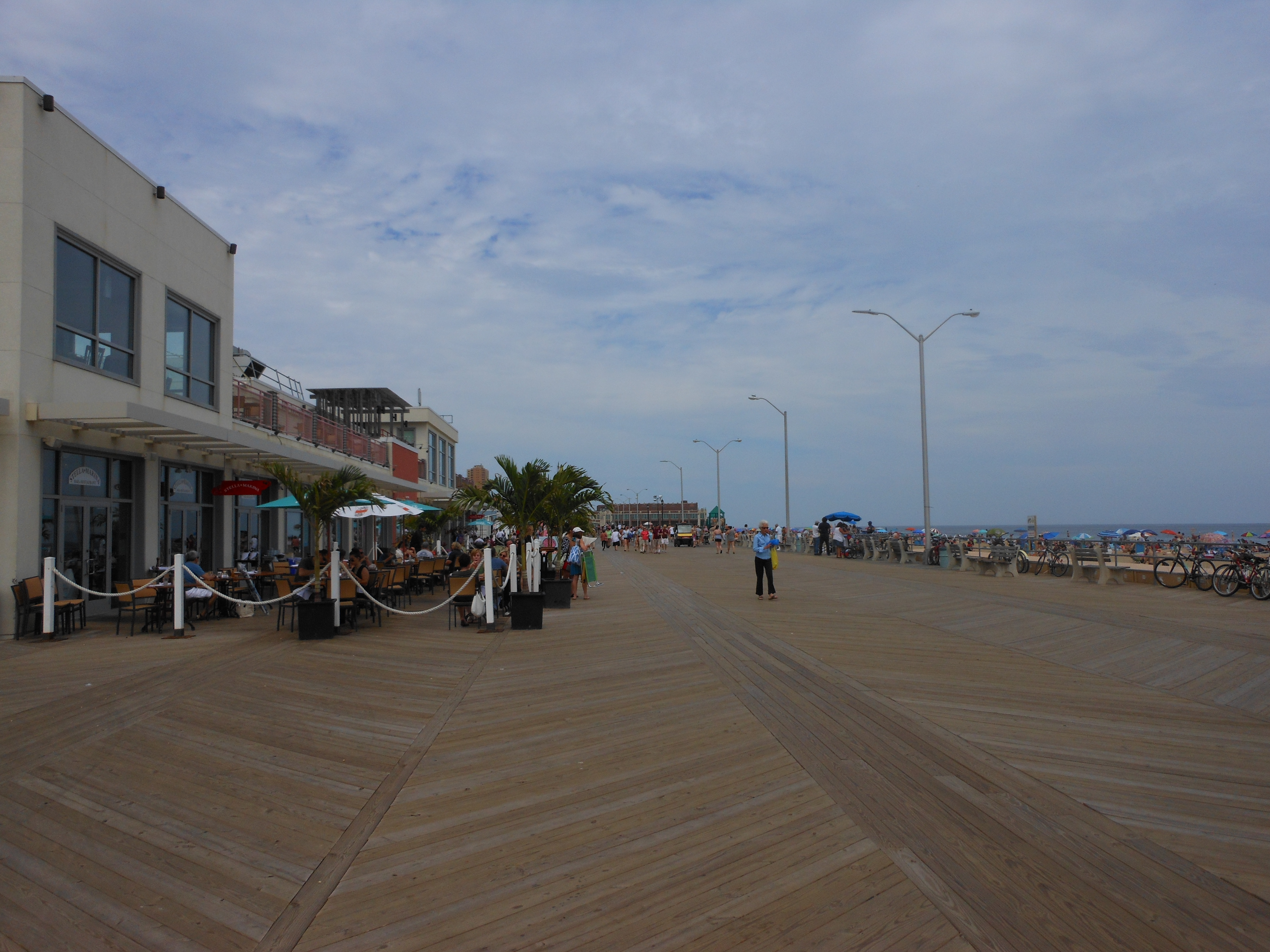
Asbury Park Boardwalk in August 2013: Repairs to the boardwalk were completed in May 2014.

From 2002 onward, the rest of Asbury Park has been in the midst of a cultural, political, and economic revival, including a burgeoning industry of local and national artists. Its dilapidated downtown district is undergoing revitalization, while most of the nearly empty blocks that overlook the beach and boardwalk are slated for massive reconstruction. In 2005, the casino's walkway reopened, as did many of the boardwalk pavilions. In 2007, the eastern portion of the casino building was demolished. The plans are to rebuild this portion to look much like the original, but the interior will be dramatically different and may include a public market (as opposed to previously being an arena and skating rink). By 2020, the casino building still remained unrestored and had no permanent use, although it had been used to host temporary art installations.

Also, more of a resurgence has occurred in the downtown, as well as of the boardwalk, with the grand reopening of the historic Steinbach department store building and the rehabilitation of Convention Hall and the Fifth Avenue Pavilion (previously home to one of the last remaining Howard Johnson's restaurants). The historic Berkeley-Carteret Hotel, which is to be restored to four-star resort status, was acquired in 2007; the first residents moved into the newly constructed condominiums known as North Beach, with the rehabilitation of Ocean Avenue and the opening of national businesses on Asbury Avenue.

After Hurricane Sandy, Asbury Park was one of the few communities on the Jersey Shore to reopen successfully for the 2013 summer season. Most of the boardwalk had not been badly damaged by the massive hurricane. On Memorial Day weekend 2013, Governor Chris Christie and President Barack Obama participated in an official ceremony before a crowd of 4,000, marking the reopening of Asbury Park and other parts of the Jersey Shore. The "Stronger than the Storm" motto was emphasized at this ceremony.

== Geography ==
According to the United States Census Bureau, the city had a total area of 1.61 square miles (4.17 km^{2}), of which 0.18 sq mi (0.47 km^{2}) is covered by water (11.18%).

Unincorporated communities, localities, and place names located partially or completely within the city include North Asbury and Whitesville (located along the city's border with Neptune Township).

The city borders the Monmouth County communities of Interlaken, Loch Arbour, Neptune Township, and Ocean Township.

Deal Lake covers 158 acres (64 ha) and is overseen by the Deal Lake Commission, which was established in 1974. Seven municipalities border the lake, accounting for 27 miles (43 km) of shoreline, also including Allenhurst, Deal, Interlaken, Loch Arbour, Neptune Township and Ocean Township.

Sunset Lake, situated in the southwestern part of the city, stretches over 16 acres (6.5 ha). It is a popular destination for both residents and visitors, offering a serene setting and a variety of recreational activities.

== Demographics ==
Historical population
Census	Pop.	Note	%±
1900	4,148		—
1910	11,150		168.8%
1920	13,400		20.2%
1930	14,981		11.8%
1940	14,617		−2.4%
1950	17,094		16.9%
1960	17,366		1.6%
1970	16,533		−4.8%
1980	17,015		2.9%
1990	16,799		−1.3%
2000	16,930		0.8%
2010	16,116		−4.8%
2020	15,188		−5.8%
2023 (est.)	15,391		1.3%
U.S. Decennial Census; Population sources: 1900–1920; 1900–1910 1900–1930; 1940–2000 2000; 2010 2020

=== Racial and ethnic composition ===
Asbury Park city, New Jersey – Racial and ethnic composition Note: the US Census treats Hispanic/Latino as an ethnic category. This table excludes Latinos from the racial categories and assigns them to a separate category. Hispanics/Latinos may be of any race.
Race / Ethnicity (NH = Non-Hispanic)	Pop 2000	Pop 2010	Pop 2020	% 2000	% 2010	% 2020
White alone (NH)	3,147	3,511	5,284	18.59%	21.79%	34.79%
Black or African American alone (NH)	10,236	7,955	5,059	60.46%	49.36%	33.31%
Native American or Alaska Native alone (NH)	38	40	14	0.22%	0.25%	0.09%
Asian alone (NH)	118	72	162	0.70%	0.45%	1.07%
Native Hawaiian or Pacific Islander alone (NH)	6	13	4	0.04%	0.08%	0.03%
Other race alone (NH)	39	57	79	0.23%	0.35%	0.52%
Multiracial (NH)	709	353	507	4.19%	2.19%	3.34%
Hispanic or Latino (any race)	2,637	4,115	4,079	15.58%	25.53%	26.86%
Total	16,930	16,116	15,188	100.00%	100.00%	100.00%

=== 2020 census ===
As of the 2020 census, Asbury Park had a population of 15,188. The median age was 36.5 years; 19.3% of the residents were under 18 and 13.1% were 65 or older. For every 100 females, there were 101.0 males, and for every 100 females 18 and over, there were 101.0 males 18 and over.

All of the residents lived in urban areas, while none lived in rural areas.

Of the 7,087 households in Asbury Park, 21.3% had children under 18 living in them, 20.0% were married-couple households, 29.9% were households with a male householder and no spouse or partner present, and 39.0% were households with a female householder and no spouse or partner present. About 45.2% of all households were made up of individuals, and 14.2% had someone living alone who was 65 years of age or older.

The city had 8,274 housing units, of which 14.3% were vacant. The homeowner vacancy rate was 8.3% and the rental vacancy rate was 5.4%.

=== 2010 census ===
In the 2010 United States census. 16,116 people, 6,725 households, and 3,174 families lived in the city. The population density was 11,319.5 per square mile (4,370.5/km^{2}). The 8,076 housing units had an average density of 5,672.4 per square mile (2,190.1/km^{2}). The racial makeup was 36.45% White, 51.35% Black or African American, 0.49% Native American, 0.48% Asian, 0.12% Pacific Islander, 7.64% from other races, and 3.46% from two or more races. Hispanic or Latino people of any race were 25.53% of the population.

Of the 6,725 households, 24.1% had children under 18, 18.2% were married couples living together, 23.1% had a female householder with no husband present, and 52.8% were not families. About 42.1% were made up of individuals, and 13.4% had someone living alone who was 65 or older. The average household size was 2.35, and the average family size was 3.33.

In the city, the age distribution was 23.8% under 18, 10.7% from 18 to 24, 30.7% from 25 to 44, 24.5% from 45 to 64, and 10.3% who were 65 or older. The median age was 34.0 years. For every 100 females, the population had 95.2 males. For every 100 females 18 and older, there were 95.9 males.

The Census Bureau's 2006–2010 American Community Survey showed that (in 2010 inflation-adjusted dollars) median household income was $33,527 (with a margin of error of +/− $2,802) and the median family income was $27,907 (+/− $5,012). Males had a median income of $34,735 (+/− $3,323) versus $33,988 (+/− $4,355) for females. The per capita income for the borough was $20,368 (+/− $1,878). About 31.1% of families and 29.4% of the population were below the poverty line, including 44.9% of those under 18 and 26.0% of those 65 or over.

=== 2000 census ===
As of the 2000 U.S. census, 16,930 people, 6,754 households, and 3,586 families were residing in the city. The population density was 14,290.0 inhabitants per square mile (5,517.4/km^{2}) making it Monmouth County's most densely populated municipality. The 7,744 housing units had an average density of 5,416.7 per square mile (2,091.4/km^{2}). The racial makeup of the city was 15.77% White, 67.11% Black, 0.32% Native American, 0.70% Asian, 0.07% Pacific Islander, 6.49% from other races, and 5.53% from two or more races. Hispanic or Latino people of any race were 18.58% of the population.

Of thee 6,754 households, 31.0% had children under 18 living with them, 20.2% were married couples living together, 26.9% had a female householder with no husband present, and 46.9% were not families. About 39.4% of all households were made up of individuals, and 15.2% had someone living alone who was 65 or older. The average household size was 2.46, and the average family size was 3.36.

In the city, the age distribution was 30.1% under 18, 10.6% from 18 to 24, 29.8% from 25 to 44, 18.3% from 45 to 64, and 11.2% who were 65 or older. The median age was 31 years. For every 100 females, there were 88.4 males. For every 100 females 18 and over, there were 83.2 males.

The median income in the city for a household was $23,081 and for a family was $26,370. Males had a median income of $27,081 versus $24,666 for females. The per capita income for the city was $13,516. About 29.3% of families and 40.1% of the population were below the poverty line, including 46.5% of those under 18 and 37.1% of those 65 or over.

== Economy ==
=== Urban enterprise zone ===
Portions of the city are part of a joint urban enterprise zone with Long Branch, one of 32 zones covering 37 municipalities statewide. The city was selected in 1994 as one of a group of 10 zones added to participate in the program. In addition to other benefits to encourage employment and investment within the UEZ, shoppers can take advantage of a reduced 3.3125% sales tax rate (half of the 6 5/8% rate charged statewide) at eligible merchants. Established in September 1994, the city's Urban Enterprise Zone status expires in September 2025.

=== Hotels ===
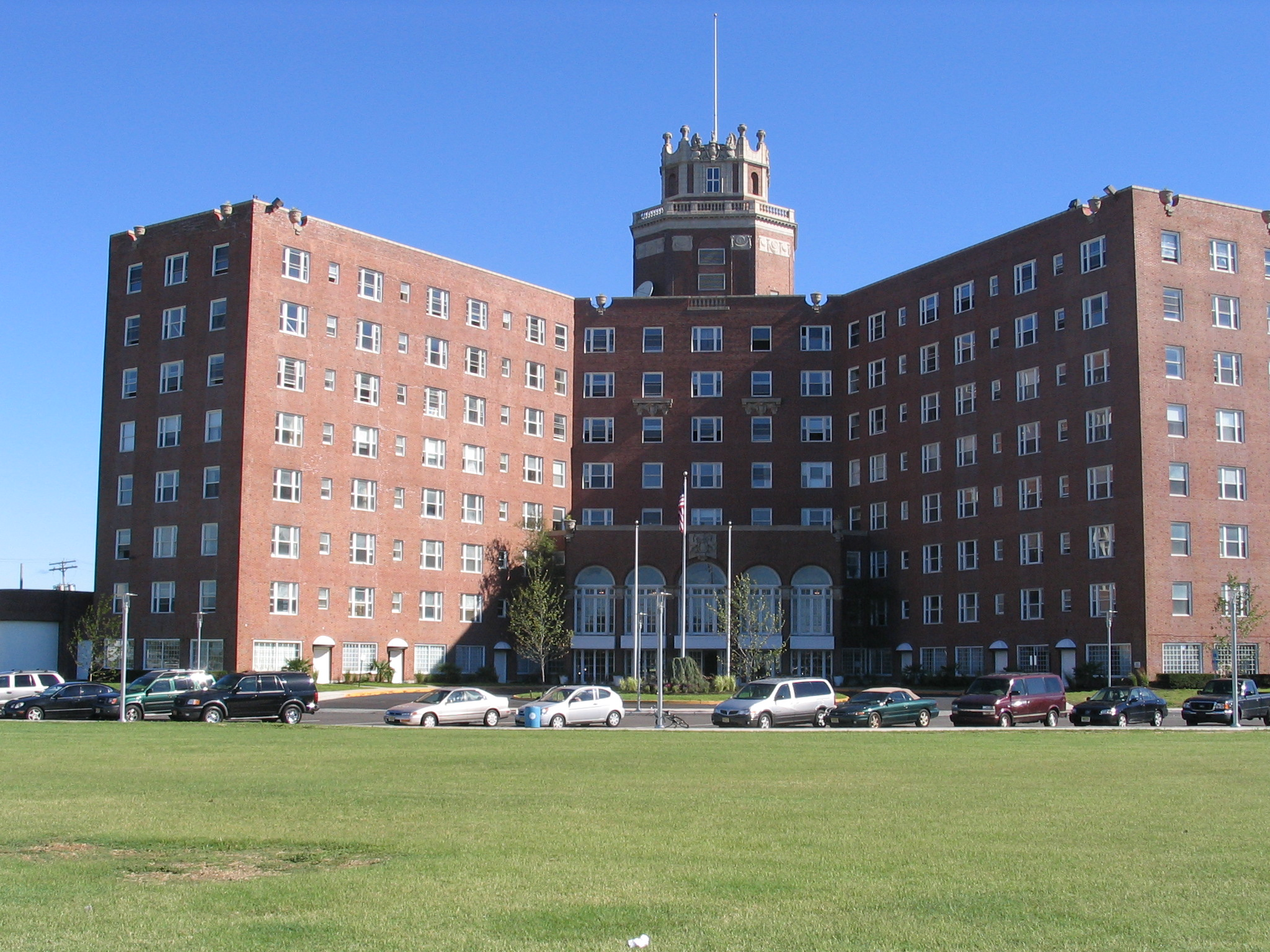
Berkeley Hotel, 2007

At one time, many hotels were along the beachfront, but many were demolished after years of sitting vacant, although the Sixth Avenue House Bed and Breakfast Hotel (formerly Berea Manor) was recently restored after being abandoned in the 1970s, it is no longer operational and was sold as a single-family home. Hotels such as the Berkeley and Oceanic Inn have operated concurrently for decades, while the Empress Hotel and the former Hotel Tides were restored and reopened. The Asbury Hotel, located on 5th Avenue a block from the boardwalk, opened in 2017 as the city's first new hotel in decades, constructed in the shell of a former Salvation Army boardinghouse.

Operating hotels include the Berkeley Oceanfront Hotel (formerly the Berkeley-Carteret Oceanfront Hotel), the Empress Hotel, the St. Laurent Social Club (formerly known as Hotel Tides), Asbury Park Inn, Mikell's Big House Bed and Breakfast, and the Asbury Hotel and Asbury Ocean Club Hotel, both developed by iStar, the master developer for the Asbury Park Waterfront.

Demolished:

- The Albion Hotel (2001)
- The Metropolitan Hotel (2007)

== Media ==
Local media includes:

- The Asbury Park Press
- TAPinto Asbury Park began publishing local coverage in 2022.
- The Coaster, an award-winning weekly newspaper which has covered local news in Asbury Park since it was founded in 1983.
- The Asbury Park Sun
- TriCity News, a weekly news and art publication for the three seaside cities of Asbury Park, Long Branch and Red Bank.
- The Asbury Park Reporter is an independent local community news source formed by local journalists.
- Asbury Park Vibes magazine is a publication dedicated to live music performance, photography and new releases in Asbury and the surrounding area.

== Arts and culture ==
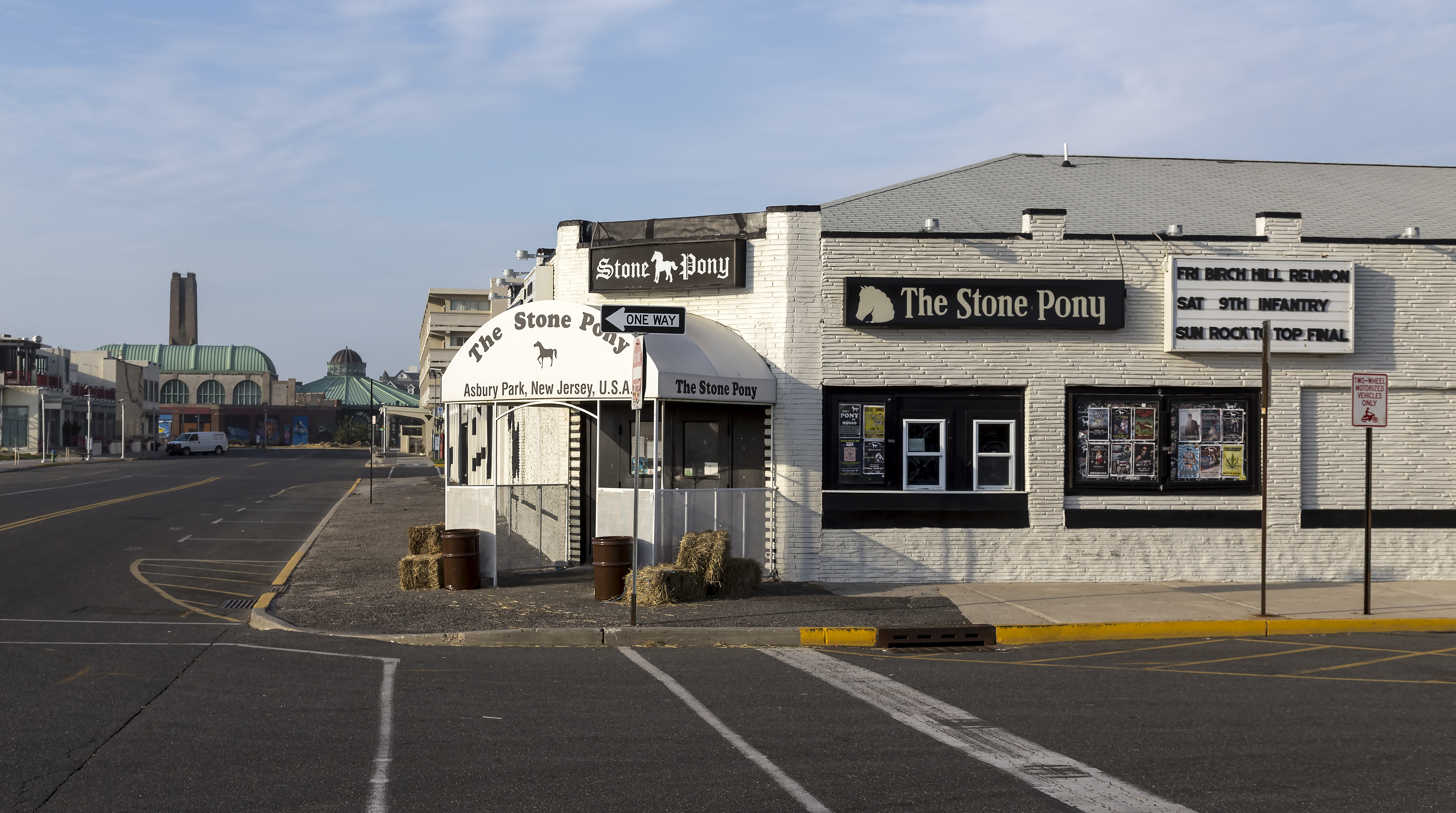
The Stone Pony in Asbury Park

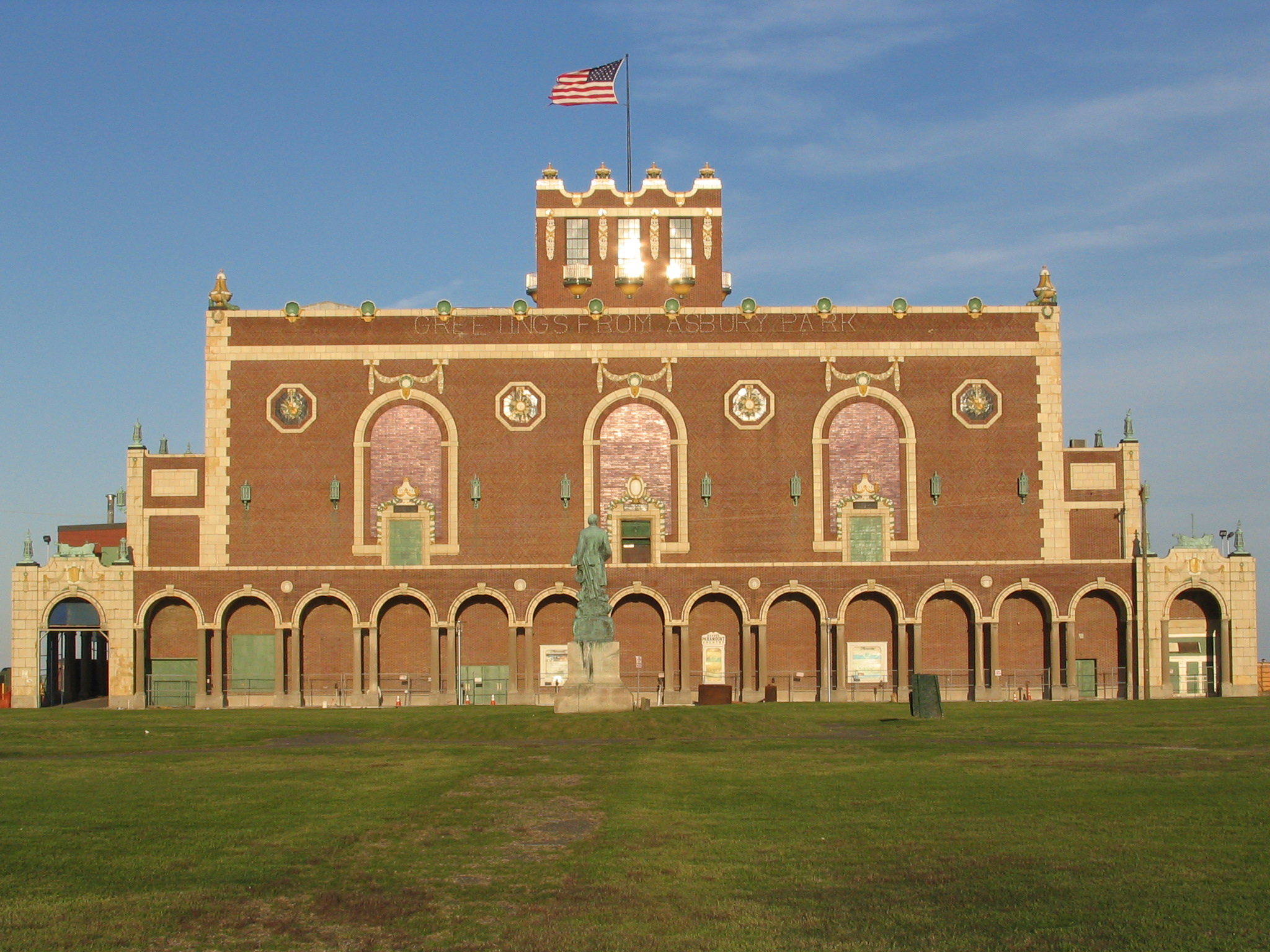
Asbury Park Convention Hall and Paramount Theatre (Asbury Park, New Jersey) complex

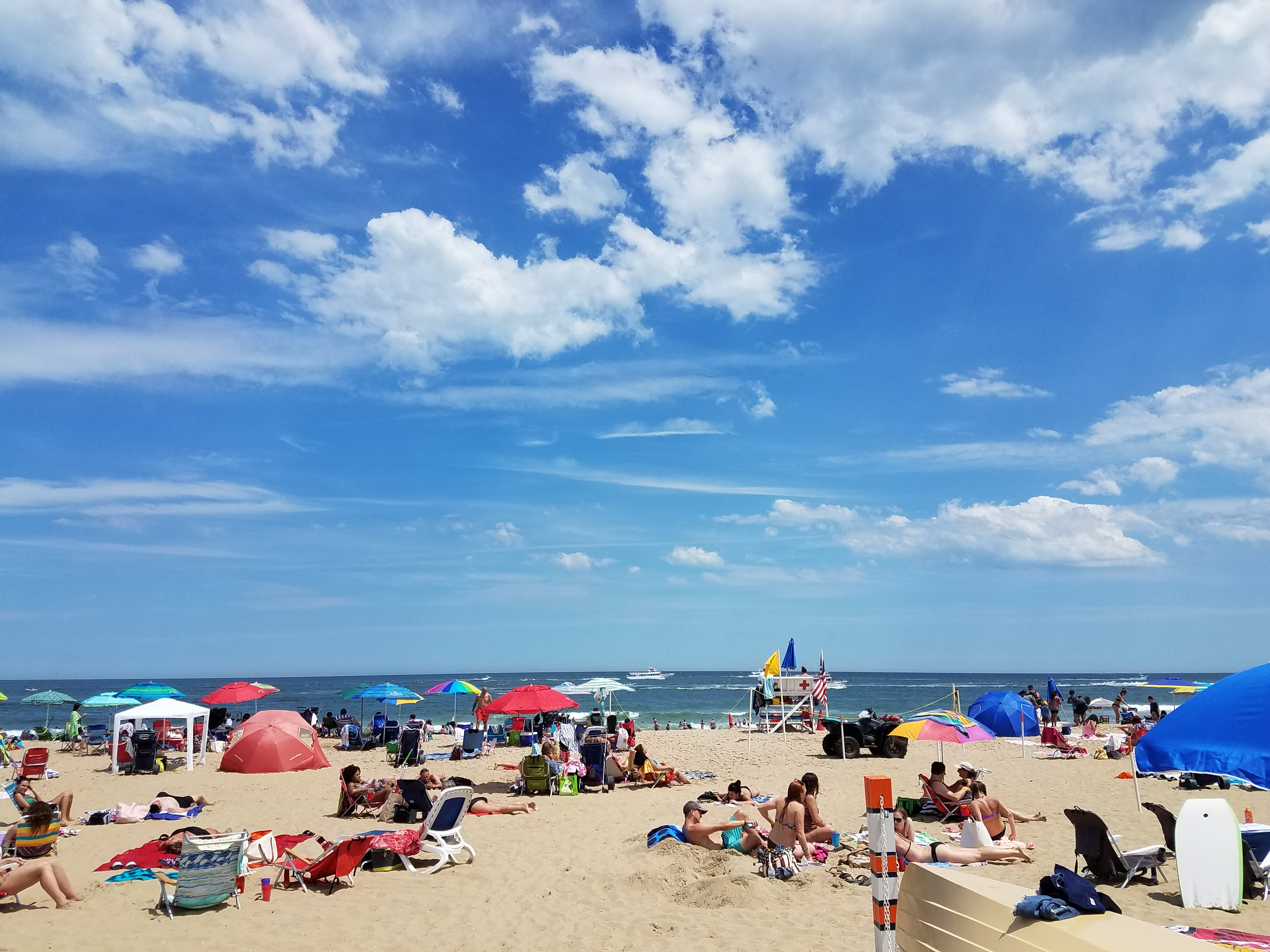
Asbury Park beach

=== Music ===
The Asbury Park music scene gained prominence in the 1960s with bands such as the Jaywalkers and many others, who combined rock and roll, rhythm and blues, soul, and doo-wop to create what became known as the Sound of Asbury Park (S.O.A.P.), also known as the Jersey Shore sound: a guitar and horn-heavy, high-energy bar-band music.

On December 9, 2006, founding members of S.O.A.P. reunited for the "Creators of S.O.A.P.: Live, Raw, and Unplugged" concert at The Stone Pony and to witness the dedication of a S.O.A.P. plaque on the boardwalk outside of Convention Hall. The original plaque included the names Johnny Shaw, Billy Ryan, Bruce Springsteen, Garry Tallent, Steve Van Zandt, Mickey Holiday, "Stormin'" Norman Seldin, Vini "Mad Dog" Lopez, Fast Eddie "Doc Holiday" Wohanka, Billy "Cherry Bomb" Lucia, Clarence Clemons, Nicky Addeo, Donnie Lowell, Jim "Jack Valentine" Cattanach, Ken "Popeye" Pentifallo, Jay Pilling, John "Cos" Consoli, Gary "A" Arntz, Larry "The Great" Gadsby, Steve "Mole" Wells, Ray Dahrouge, Johnny "A" Arntz, David Sancious, Margaret Potter, Tom Potter, Sonny Kenn, Tom Wuorio, Rick DeSarno, Southside Johnny Lyon, Leon Trent, Buzzy Lubinsky, Danny Federici, Bill Chinnock, Patsy Siciliano, and Sam Siciliano. An additional plaque was added on August 29, 2008, honoring John Luraschi, Carl "Tinker" West, George Theiss, Vinnie Roslin, Mike Totaro, Lenny Welch, Steve Lusardi, and Johnny Petillo.

Musicians and bands with strong ties to Asbury Park, many of whom frequently played clubs there on their way to fame, include Fury of Five, the Gaslight Anthem, Clarence Clemons, the E Street Band, Jon Bon Jovi and Bon Jovi, Southside Johnny and the Asbury Jukes, Patti Smith, Arthur Pryor, Count Basie, the Clash, U.S. Chaos, Johnny Thunders, the Ramones, the Exploited, Charged GBH, and Gary U.S. Bonds.

In 1973, Bruce Springsteen released his debut album Greetings from Asbury Park, N.J. On his follow-up album, The Wild, the Innocent and the E Street Shuffle, one of the songs is entitled "4th of July, Asbury Park (Sandy)". Several books chronicle the early years of Springsteen's career in Asbury Park. Daniel Wolff's 4 July Asbury Park examines the social, political and cultural history of the city with a special emphasis on the part that music played in the city's development, culminating in Springsteen's music. Beyond the Palace by Gary Wien is a comprehensive look at the local music scene from which Springsteen emerged, and includes many photographs of musicians and clubs. Against the backdrop of the fading resort, Alex Austin's novel The Red Album of Asbury Park tracks a young rock musician pursuing his dream in the late '60s to early '70s, with Springsteen as a potent but as-yet-unknown rival. In 2026, the Bruce Springsteen Center for American Music at Monmouth University opened north of the city in West Long Branch.

A black-and-white multicamera recording of Blondie in 1979, just prior to the release of their fourth album, Eat to the Beat, was recorded at the Asbury Park Convention Hall on July 7, a home-state crowd for Jersey girl Debbie Harry, who was raised in Hawthorne.

The music video for Springsteen's "Tunnel of Love", directed by Irish director Meiert Avis, was filmed at the city's Palace Amusements and on the Asbury Park boardwalk at sunset in November 1987.

=== New Jersey Music Hall of Fame ===
The New Jersey Music Hall of Fame was founded in Asbury Park in 2005. Plans had been made to build a music museum somewhere in the city as part of the redevelopment.

=== Black music and Springwood Avenue ===
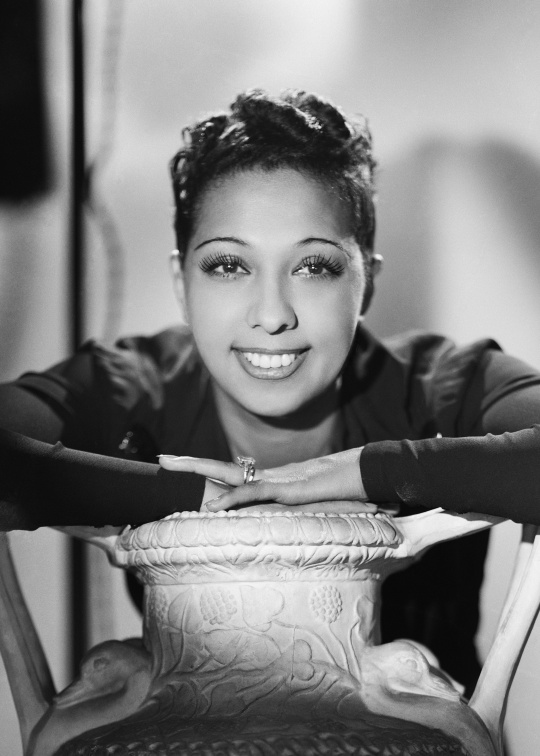
Josephine Baker was one of many African American musicians who either played or was inspired by the Springwood Avenue music club circuit.

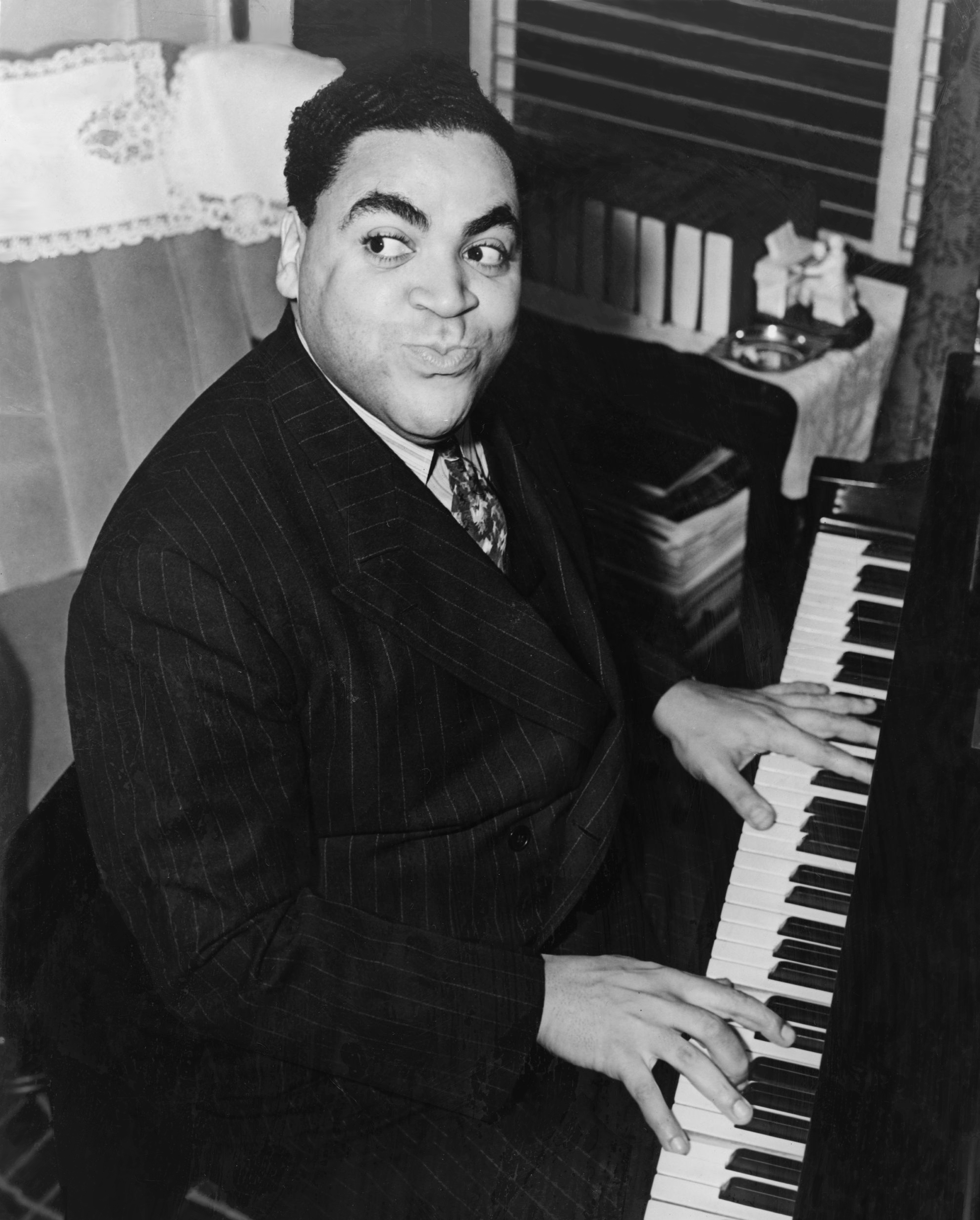
Fats Waller wrote "Honeysuckle Rose" with Andy Razaf on 119 Atkins Avenue.

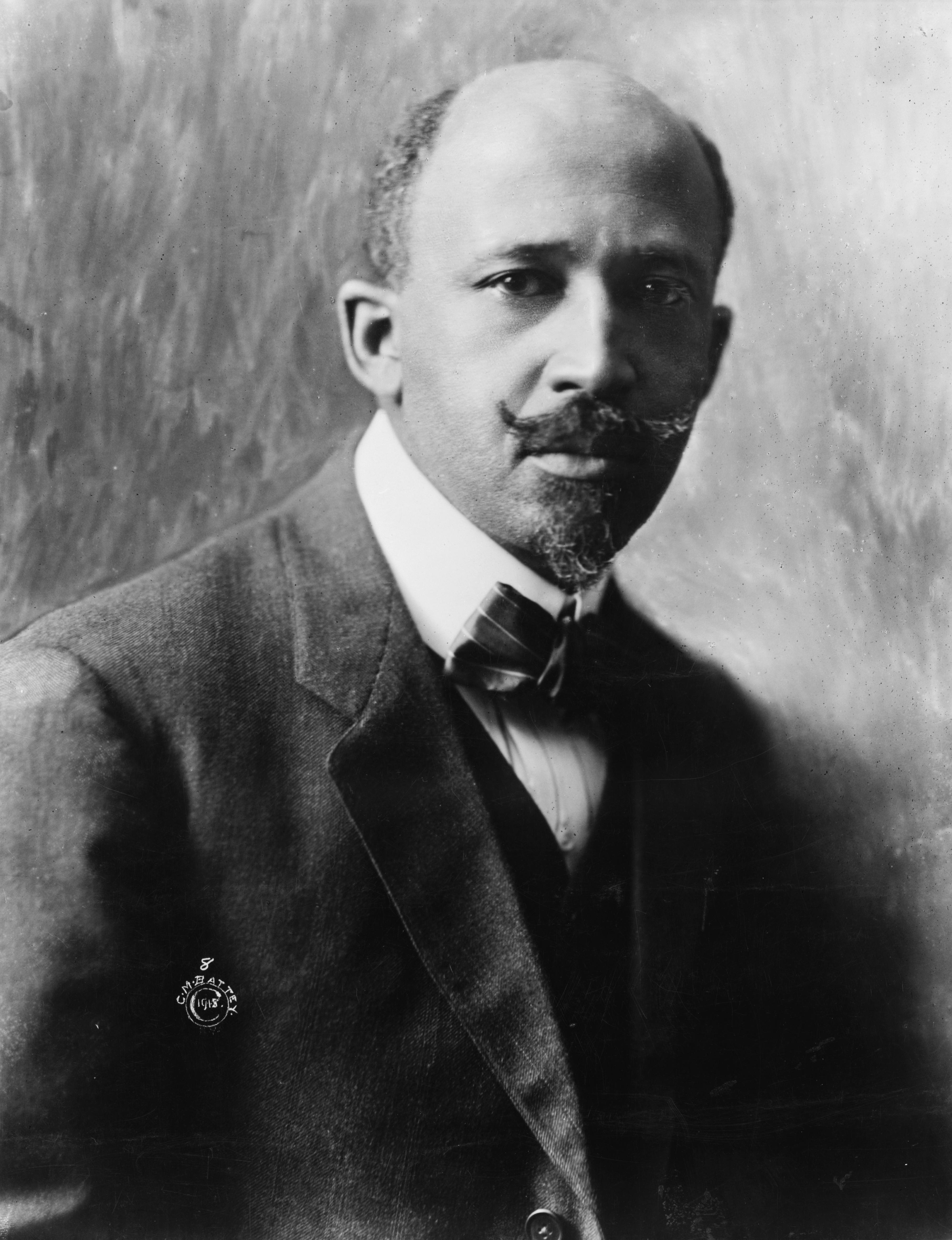
W. E. B. Du Bois spoke at Roseland Hall.

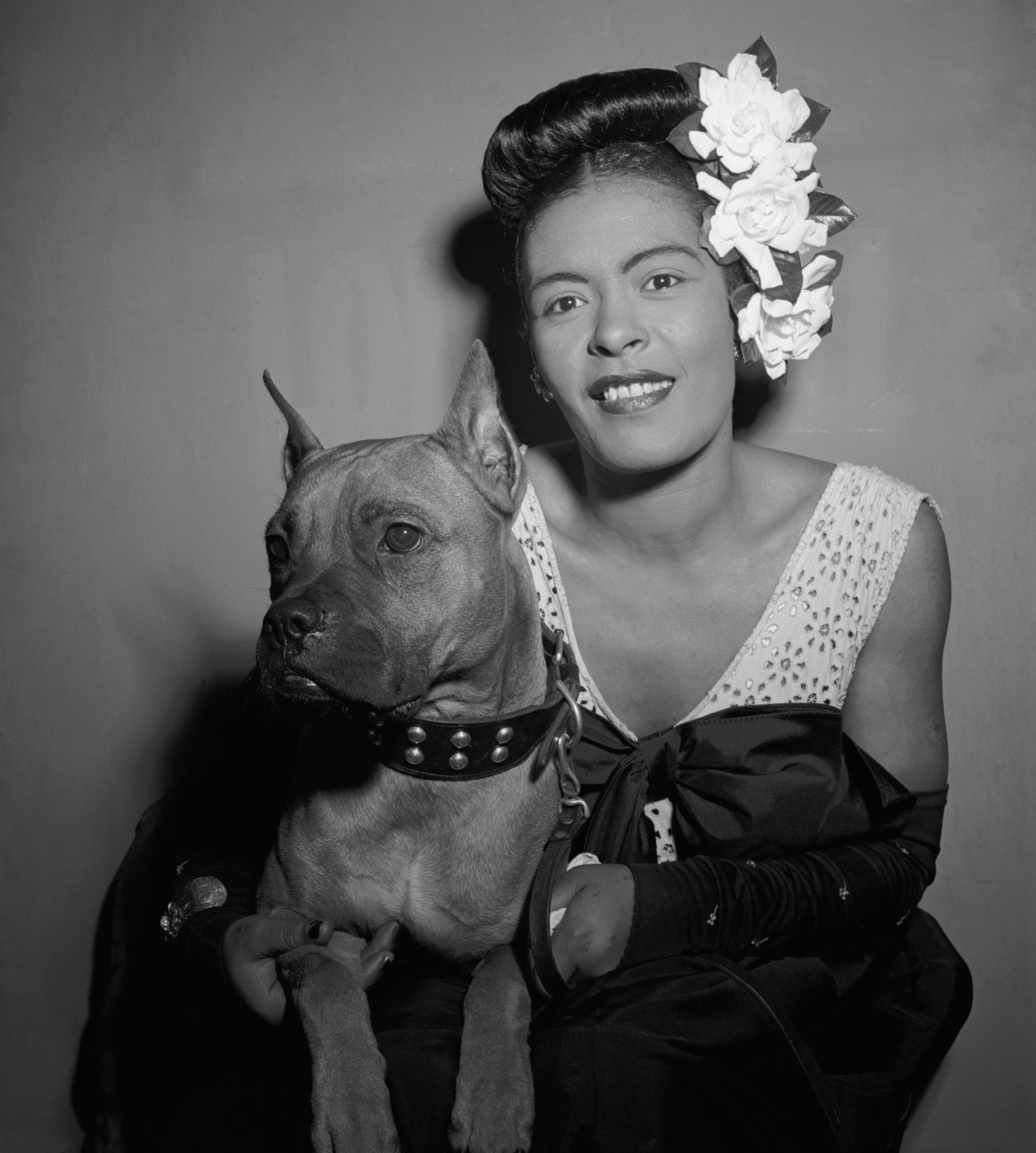
Billie Holiday played at Cuba's on the west side of town.

The West Side of Asbury Park has traditionally been home to Black music, including jazz, soul, gospel, doo wop, and rhythm and blues (R&B). African American artists such as the Jersey Shore's own Count Basie, as well as Duke Ellington, Lenny Welch, the Broadways, Josephine Baker, Claude Hopkins, Bobby Thomas, Rex Stewart, Manzie Johnson, Sidney Bechet, and Clarence Clemons "either played or were inspired by the [Black]-centered Springwood Avenue club circuit on the West Side of Asbury Park" in the early to mid-century period at places such as the Smile-A-While and Gypsy George's.

During a visit to the West Side in 1928, Fats Waller wrote "Honeysuckle Rose" with Andy Razaf at 119 Atkins Avenue in a property that still stands.

Billie Holiday, Tina Turner, Little Richard, and the Four Tops all played at Cuba's on the West Side in the mid-century period. The former home of the Turf Club, once a well-known, mid-century jazz and R&B joint across from what is now Springwood Park, was recently decorated with jazz-themed mural art by a team of local artists to mark its heritage. At the present-day site of Springwood Park in 1918, Black entrepreneur Reese DuPree turned Lafayette Hall (later the Roseland Hall auditorium) into a popular nightclub. The location was also used for civil rights activities; Marcus Garvey and W. E. B. Du Bois both spoke at Roseland Hall. The Asbury Park Music Foundation, working with Lakehouse Music Academy and the Boys and Girls Club of Monmouth County, founded the Hip Hop Institute to teach music and life skills relevant to young hip hop enthusiasts.

The Asbury Park Museum hosts an exhibit on the history of music on the West Side, spanning the decades from 1880 to 1980.

The Asbury Park African-American Music Project created a virtual West Side museum dedicated to the history of Black music in the city.

=== Live music and arts venues ===
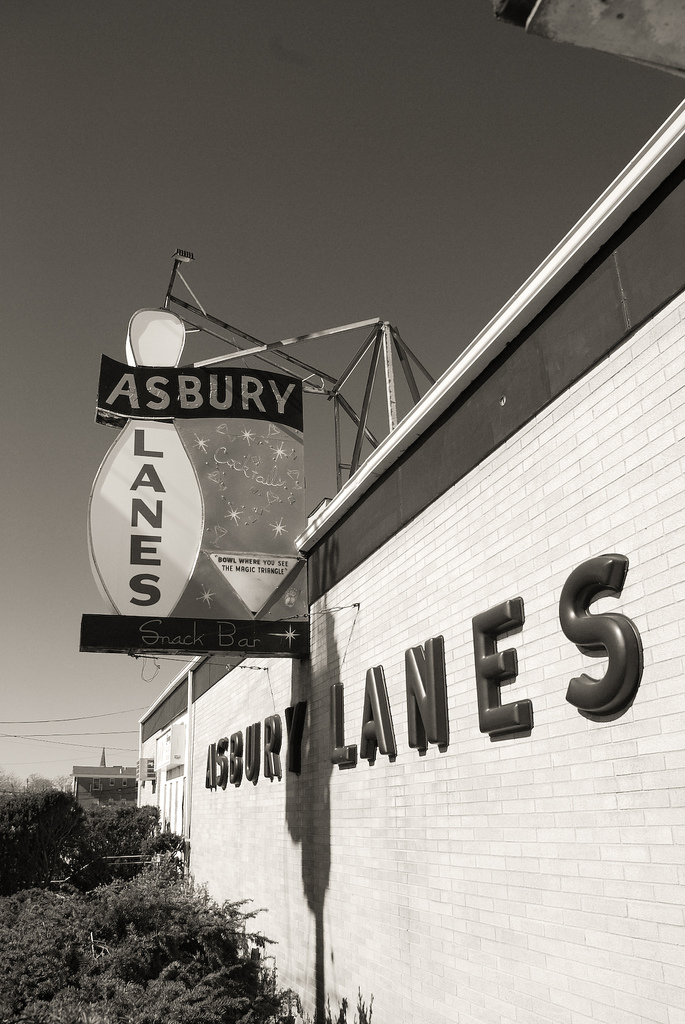
Asbury Lanes

With its long history as a resort town for varied social classes, Asbury Park is considered a destination for musicians, particularly a subgenre of rock and roll known as the Jersey Shore sound, which is infused with R&B. As of the 2020s, it is a frequent touring stop for both burgeoning and well-known acts. It is home to venues including:

- The Stone Pony, founded in 1974, is a starting point for many performers.
- Across town, on Fourth Avenue, is Asbury Lanes, a functioning bowling alley and bar with live performances ranging from musical acts (formerly with a heavy focus on punk music), neo-Burlesque, hot rod, and art shows. The venue's focus has been mostly on indie rock and pop.
- Asbury Park Convention Hall holds larger events.
- The Paramount Theatre is adjacent to Convention Hall.
- Wonder Bar
- House of Independents
- The Asbury Park Brewery hosts small shows with a focus on punk music
- The Turf Club - "Tuesday at the Turf” is a summer music series held by the Asbury Park African-American Music Project (AP-AMP) at the Turf Club site across from Springwood Park, which is the last extant structure that once contained one of Springwood's many mid-century live Black music spots. The AP-AMP hopes to transform the space into a community venue for music and culture.
- The Empress Hotel is an LGBT resort owned by music producer Shep Pettibone that features Paradise Nightclub.
- The Baronet, a vintage movie theater which dates back to Buster Keaton's era, was near Asbury Lanes, but its roof recently caved in and the building was demolished. The Asbury Hotel pays homage to this once great theater with its 5th floor rooftop movie theater called "The Baronet". The Asbury Hotel also has an eighth-floor rooftop bar, paying homage to the former building inhabitants and calling it "Salvation".
- The Kingsley Theater at the Berkeley Oceanfront Hotel - The newly formed Asbury Park Theater Company presented Green Day’s American Idiot, the Tony Award-winning Broadway musical, as the company's debut production at this theater in 2022.
- The Upstage Club was a legendary blues, R&B, and rock club that was alcohol-and-drug free and is said to have influenced the Jersey Shore sound in its short run from 1968 to 1971.

In a town that was once nearly abandoned, a large number of restaurants, bars, coffee houses, two breweries, a coffee roastery, and live music venues are now situated in Asbury Park's boardwalk and downtown districts.

=== Festivals and events ===
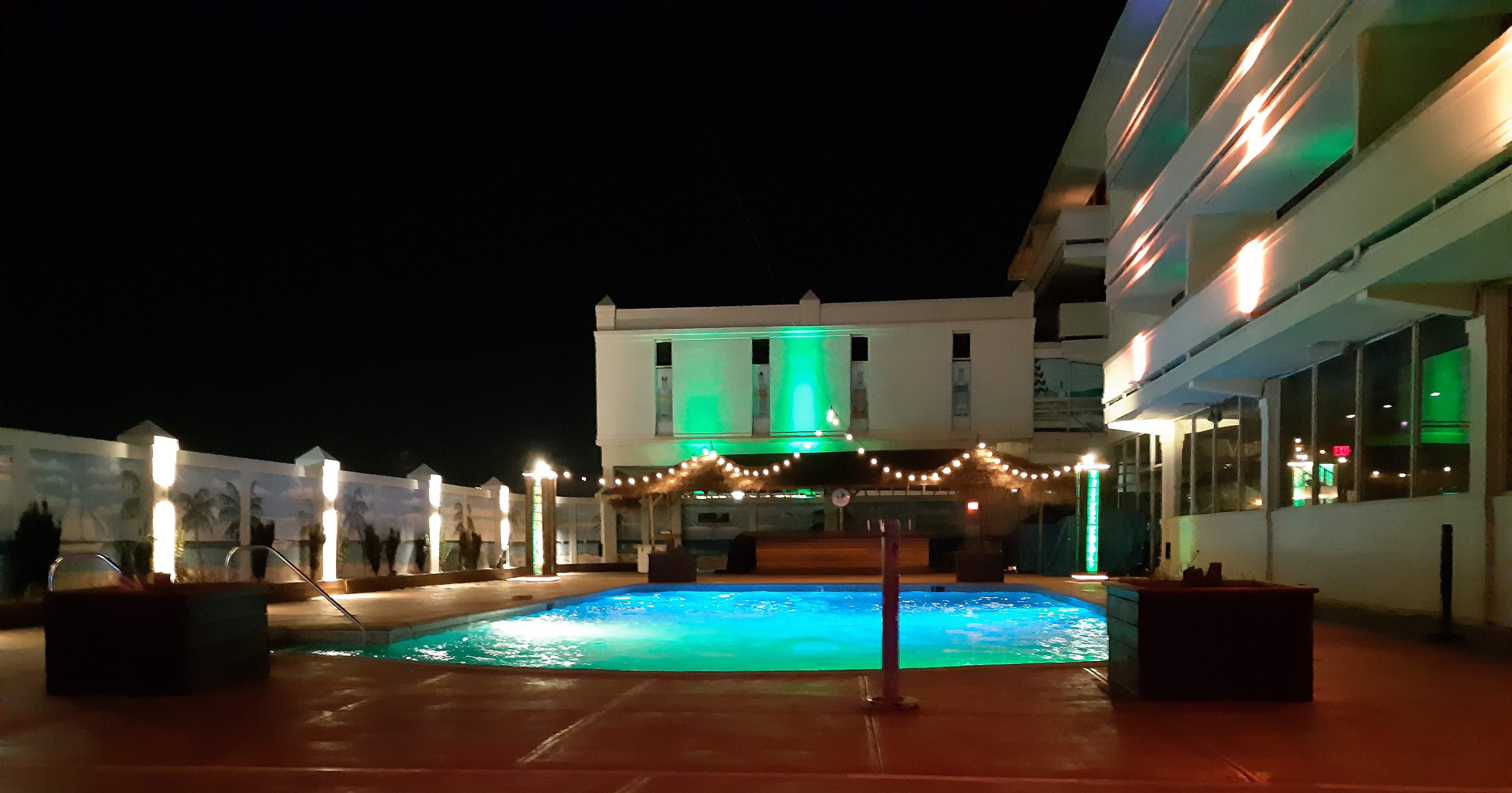
Paradise nightclub

- The Asbury Park Porch Fest is a free, family-friendly music festival featuring a series performances on local porches, lawns, and parks. The fifth annual event was held in 2021.
- The annual North to Shore festival features music, comedy, film, and other entertainment alongside technical discussions at events in Asbury Park, Atlantic City, and Newark throughout June.
- Established in 1972, Jersey Pride, the state's largest and oldest Pride parade, is held annually on the first Sunday in June, attracting more than 20,000 attendees.
- Asbury Park Jazz Fest
- Asbury Park Music Foundation is a nonprofit organization that offers live music throughout the year, including the free summer concert series Music Mondays in Springwood Park, AP Live, and the Asbury Park Concert Band on the boardwalk. Ticketed events, including Sundays on St. John's, and A Very Asbury Holiday Show! at the Paramount Theater. Sunday Sessions are held throughout the year to benefit the music foundation's mission to provide music education programs, scholarships, and instruments to the underserved youth in the community, as well as supporting established and emerging local musicians with opportunities to perform.
- The Asbury Park Surf Music Festival, held on the boardwalk in August, celebrates surf music .
- The Asbury Music Awards. Formerly known as the Golden T-Bird Awards, these were established in 1993 by Scott Stamper and Pete Mantas to recognize and support significant contributions and achievements of local and regional participants in the music industry. The name of the awards was changed to the Asbury Music Awards in 1995. The award ceremony is held in November of each year, most recently at the Stone Pony.
- The Sea.Hear.Now Festival is a surfing and music festival that first appeared on the beach in Asbury Park in September 2018, as a celebration of live music, art, ocean sustainability, and surf culture. Digital pop culture magazine The Pop Break named Sea.Hear.Now the best new music festival of the year in 2018.
- Music Mondays at Springwood Park. These are weekly live music events held at Springwood Park in the summer months. Hosted by the Asbury Park Music Foundation.
- The Wave Gathering Music Festival. Established in 2006, the festival was held during the summer. Businesses across Asbury Park offered food, drink, art, music, crafts, and their stages for performances. Stages were also set up in parks, on the boardwalk, and in other open spaces. The event took place over several days.
- First Saturday is a monthly First Saturday event. On the first Saturday of every month, Asbury Park's downtown art galleries, home design studios, restaurants, antique shops, and clothing boutiques remain open throughout the evening, serving hors d'oeuvres and offering entertainment, to showcase the city's residential and commercial resurgence.
- The Asbury Park Tattoo Convention, also known as the Visionary Tattoo Festival, is held every July.
- The Bamboozle Music Festival. This was first held in Asbury Park in 2003, 2004, and 2005. The festival returned to its original location for the ten-year anniversary in 2012, headlined by My Chemical Romance, Foo Fighters, and Bon Jovi, drawing over 90,000 people to the city over the three-day span in which it was held.
- The Asbury Park Women's Convention is held each winter.

==== List of film festivals ====
A number of New Jersey's film festivals are held in the city, including:

- APin3 Film Challenge (timed filmmaking challenge in Asbury Park)
- Asbury Park Music + Film Festival (established 2015)
- Bread and Roses Film Festival (established 2023) (women's film festival)
- The Garden State Film Festival. In 2003, actor Robert Pastorelli founded the Garden State Film Festival, which draws over 30,000 visitors to Asbury Park each spring for a four-day event including screenings of 150 features, documentaries, shorts and videos, concerts, lectures and workshops for filmmakers.
- Jersey Shore Film Festival (established 2006, Deal, Long Branch, Asbury Park, Red Bank)
- Jersey Devil Film Festival (horror/paranormal/folklore)
- Krampus Film Festival (established c. 2011) (horror/paranormal/folklore with Yuletide mythology focus)
- Hang Onto Your Shorts Film Festival (established c. 2012)
- QFest New Jersey LGBTQ Film Festival (established c. 2019)

=== Murals and public art ===
Noted muralists and other local artists have installed various murals along the Asbury Park boardwalk and the cityscape in recent years. The 2016 Wooden Walls Mural Project began in July of that year and reimagined the Sunset Pavilion building with around a dozen new murals.

=== Other arts and entertainment ===
The Asbury Park Zombie Walk is a zombie parade along the mile-long route from Convention Hall to the intersection of Main & Mattison. Held the first Saturday in October since 2008, it draws a large number of spectators and participants. Zombie-costumed participants remain in character throughout and are urged to move in a zombie-like manner. The event has grown to become one of the largest zombie walks in the world. Many do "zombie versions" of Halloween costumes. In 2013, the APZW achieved the world's largest ever gathering of zombies, with 9,592 participants setting a Guinness World Record. In 2022, the theme was punk rock.

Participants begin to gather in costume starting at 11am on the boardwalk south of Convention Hall, where makeup artists provide zombie makeovers for a fee. The APZW also has a costume contest, awarding cash and the Golden Zombie trophy.

At 3:30 the zombies perform a Thriller-style dance outside Convention Hall. At 4pm the zombie procession proceeds from Convention Hall down the boardwalk. Spectators line the blocked-off streets as the zombies turn west off the boardwalk at Asbury Ave and proceed down the parade route to end with live music at the ending street stage, where spectators can take photos with the zombies. The event ends with final judging and the Golden Zombie award ceremony.

The Sons of Ireland Polar Bear Plunge, featuring a bagpipe processional of bathers to the sand, is held every New Year's Day at the Berkeley Hotel as a fundraiser for charity.

== LGBTQ+ community ==
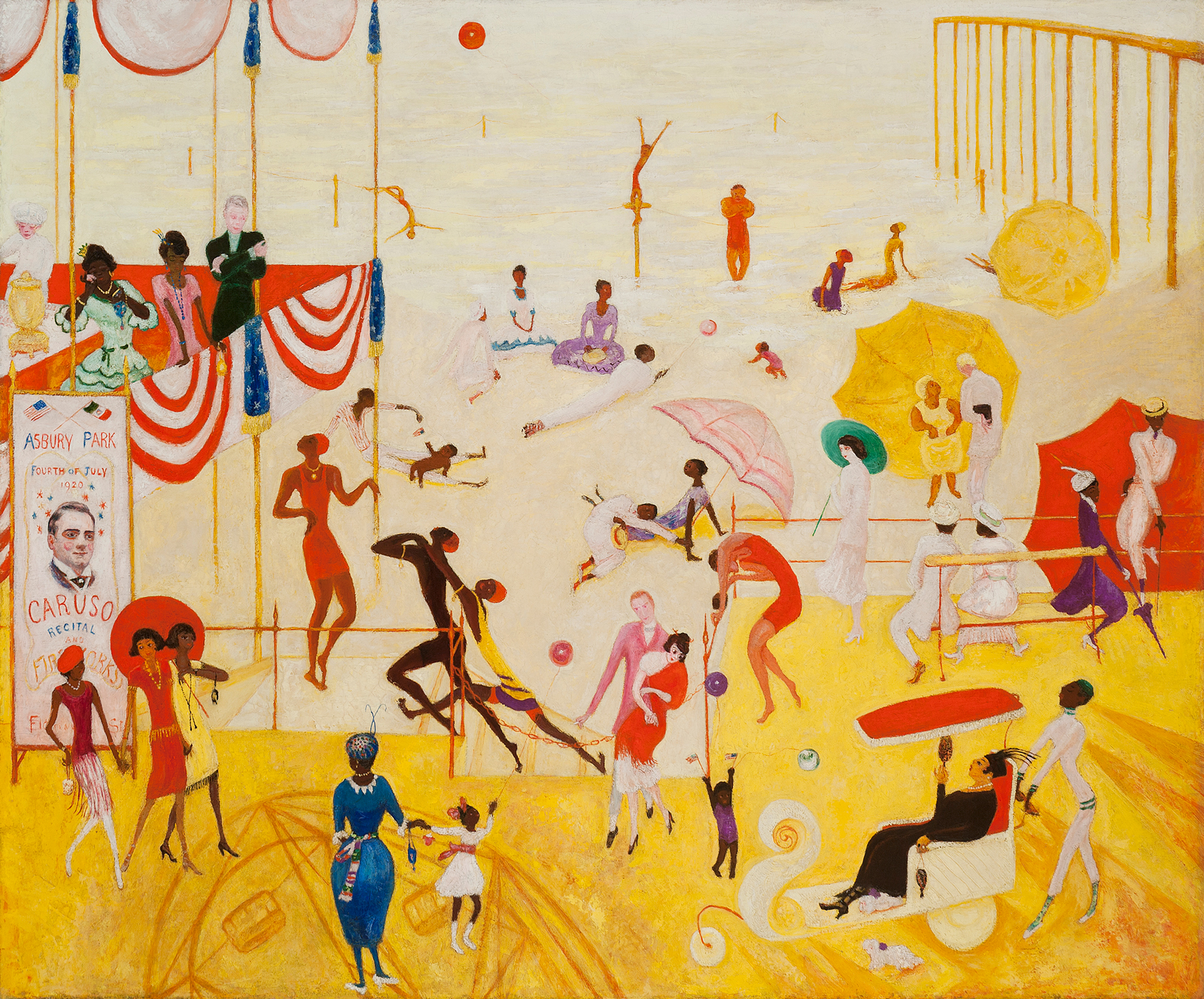
Asbury Park South, a 1920 illustration by Jazz Age artist Florine Stettheimer depicting a summer crowd and sign for Enrico Caruso live. The artist is under a green parasol and her friends also appear. Artist Marcel Duchamp (in pink) is with actress Fania Marinoff. Carl Van Vechten stands upper left (black suit), Avery Hopwood (white suit) talks with a woman in yellow, and the Swiss painter Paul Thévanaz (red) bends over a camera.

Asbury Park has been a "hub of gay life" for decades. On the first Sunday of every June, Jersey Pride, the state's largest and oldest gay pride festival and parade, draws tens of thousands of people to this LGBT destination.

In the 1930s, Greenwich Village bohemian poet Tiny Tim (Timothy Felter), a friend of Asbury Park poet Margaret Widdemer, opened a short-lived gay-friendly tearoom on Bond Street. Since the 1950s at least, Asbury Park's LGBT community has continued to grow. Mid-century Asbury Park gay bars like the Paddock Bar, the Blue Note, and lesbian bar Chez-L were targets of anti-gay enforcement by the state.

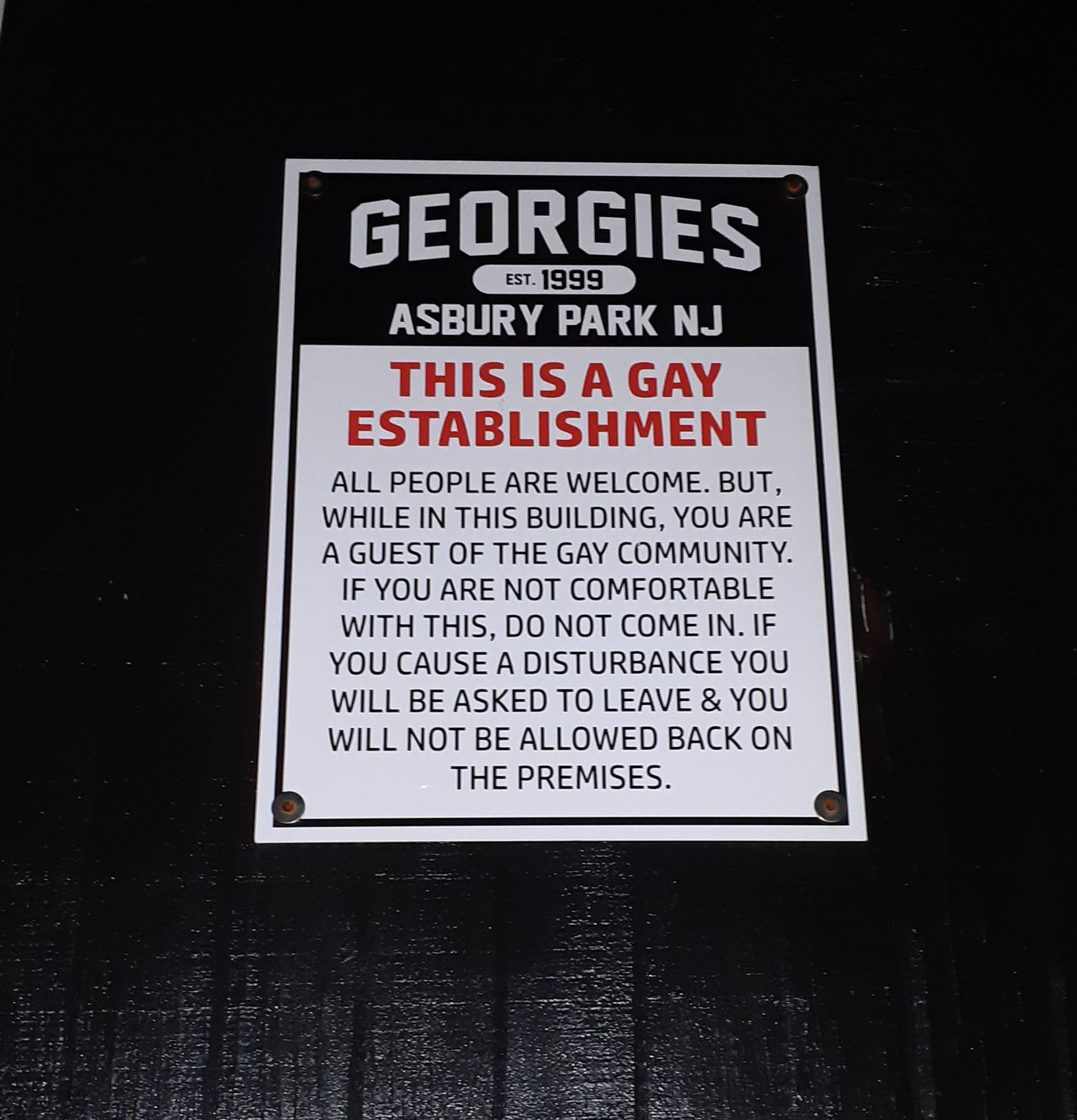
Sign outside Georgies

In later decades, other well-known now-defunct clubs and bars oriented to gay men included Archie's Bar, Down the Street (so named because it was located down the street from other 1970s and 1980s-era gay clubs), Odyssey, and M&K. After property values plummeted locally in Asbury Park in the 1970s, gays from New York City purchased and restored Victorian homes, leading to a rejuvenation of parts of the city. In the 1980s, locals recalled, Asbury Park had ten to twelve gay bars.

Garden State Equality, the LGBTQ+ rights organization, is headquartered on Main Street. In 2021, the LGBTQ+ community center QSpot relocated back to the west side of Asbury Park, having been established there in 2005. The center opened the QSpot Café, a gay-centered coffeehouse open on weekends only.

Another notable establishment is the gay dive bar Georgies (formerly the Fifth Avenue Tavern). Project R.E.A.L. is a community organization for young LGBTQ+ socializing in Asbury Park.

The LGBTQ-centered St. Laurent Social Club on Seventh Avenue first opened as the woman-owned St. Laurent Hotel in 1885. It eventually became the iconic Jersey Shore LGBTQ mainstay Hotel Tides, and reopened again as the St. Laurent in 2022 following a sale.

Multiple restaurants in city are LGBTQ+-owned. Wolfe & Kron Books is a queer-owned independent bookstore in the Uptown neighborhood, specializing in new and used books, particularly speculative fiction, and emphasizing LGBTQ+ and BIPOC authors.

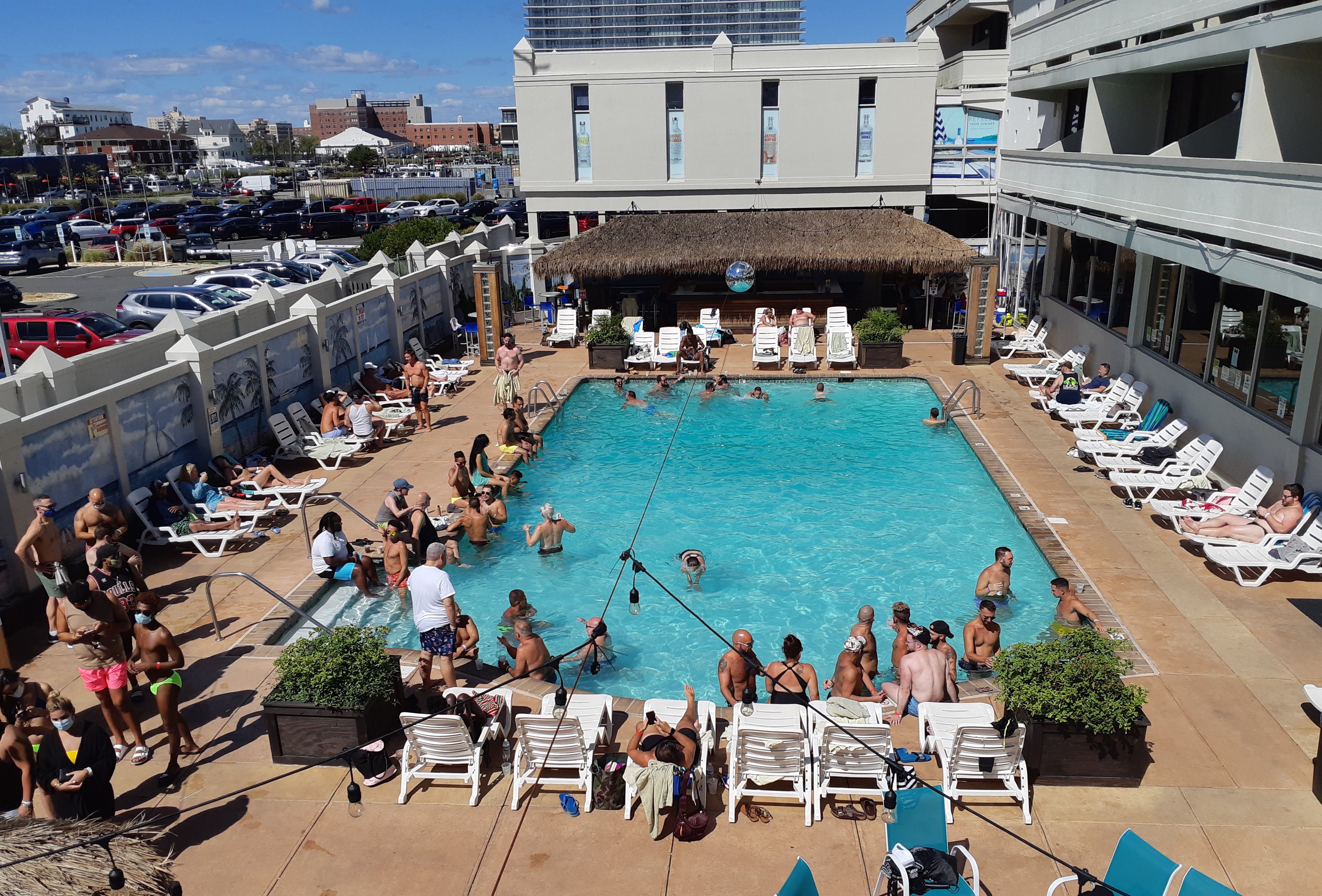
The swimming pool at Paradise, August 2020

In 1999, Madonna producer Shep Pettibone opened Paradise, a gay discotheque near the ocean. He has since also opened the Empress Hotel, one of the state's only gay-oriented hotels.

One subset of the LGBTQ+ community is the lesbian community of Asbury Park, a city with a tradition of lesbian bars stretching back to the 1930s. In the late 1930s, 208 Bond Street was the location of a women's bar. In 1965, former nun Margaret "Maggie the Cat" Hogan opened the groundbreaking lesbian club Chez Elle (French for "her house"), also known as the Chez-L Lounge, and eventually joined a lawsuit that defeated efforts to discriminate against gay patrons at New Jersey nightclubs.

The Bond Street Bar was a lesbian joint in the 1970s, and the third floor of the M&K nightclub, a gay disco at Monroe and Cookman Avenue, was for lesbians. The M&K was located in the large now-demolished Charms building at 401 Monroe Avenue, which was built in 1914 as an Elks club and served as a candy factory in the 1940s "One activist remembers, 'Bond Street used to be [a] lesbian bar--you would knock, and there was a peephole, and they would verify you were a lesbian and let you in.'"The 1980s lesbian resort, the Key West Hotel, was a large source of community for New Jersey women during that decade, as were lesbian venues like the Owl and the Pussycat, which relocated to the Key West. A Key West Hotel reunion in 2016 drew 400 people.

The Asbury Park Women's Convention is held annually, typically during March, with a focus on women-led workshops, musical performances, comedy sets, guest speakers, spoken word and other performing arts including poetry and artwork featured in a number of female-operated businesses in the Asbury area.

The inaugural Asbury Park Dyke March was held in October 2020.

== Surfing and other sports ==
Every winter, when the surf grows colder and rougher than in the summer, the city is home to the Cold War, an annual cold water surfing battle.

In 1943, the New York Yankees held spring training in Asbury Park to comply with restrictions on rail travel during World War II.

Asbury Park is the nominal home to Asbury Park FC, described as "Asbury Park's most storied sports franchise and New Jersey's second-best football club." The project is a parody of a modern pro soccer team born out of a joke between social media professional and soccer tastemaker Shawn Francis and his friend Ian Perkins, guitarist with The Gaslight Anthem. Despite never playing games the club has an extensive merchandise line available online, including new and retro replica jerseys.

== Parks and recreation ==
There are several parks and recreational activities throughout Asbury Park. Several of the parks in the city host various community events throughout the year, including many pop-up events, farmer's markets and musical performances.

The most prominent historical recreational spot is the Asbury Park Boardwalk and the beach. The boardwalk has changed a lot over the years, and today hosts various restaurants and shops, along with the 3,600-seat Asbury Park Convention Hall and 1,600-seat Paramount Theater, which are both connected via an arcade. Other activities on the boardwalk include the Silverball Retro Arcade & Museum, the Asbury Splash Park, an 18-hole mini-golf, volleyball nets on the beach, a playground and a dog park.

Parks within the city include:

- Asbury Park Rain Garden - Founded in 2010 adjacent to the Asbury Park station and bordered by Main Street, it contains a rain garden and a plaza with seating.
- Atlantic Square Park, Bradley Park, Fireman's Park, and Sunset Park & Lake - These four interconnected parks located between Sunset Avenue and Fifth Avenue together make up the largest park in the city excluding the beach. Atlantic Square Park and Bradley Park are two large grass fields with diagonal walkways that consist of two entire city blocks right behind the Convention Hall between Ocean Avenue and Webb Street, with Bradley Park having a statue in the center of Asbury Park founder James A. Bradley. These two parks host various events throughout the year, most notably the Pride Festival in June and AsburyFest in September. Past this, between Webb Street and Bond Street, is the five block long Sunset Park & Lake. The lake is divided by a bridge along Grand Avenue, which connects to St. John's Island, a small island that often has community events and gatherings. Additionally, there is the Emory Street Pedestrian Bridge by the west side of the lake. At the other end of Sunset Lake, bordered between Bond Street and Main Street, is Fireman's Park, another one block park that consists of a central seating plaza.
- Bangs Avenue Playground - Located between Barack Obama Elementary School and Thurgood Marshall Middle School along Bangs Avenue, it contains a playground and an open field.
- Community Garden - Located behind the Asbury Park City Hall and adjacent to the Asbury Park station is a small community garden that gives out vegetables on Saturday mornings during the growing season.
- Deal Lake - Located along the city's northern border, bordering Loch Arbour, Interlaken, and Ocean Township, it is the largest lake in the county, and has a boat launch ramp located next to Main Street.
- Fourth and Heck Street Playground - Playground.
- Kennedy Park - Located at the edge of downtown between Cookman Avenue and Lake Avenue and adjacent to Wesley Lake, with a JFK centerpiece memorial.
- Library Square Park - Located adjacent to the Asbury Park library, it has a fountain in the center dedicated to Frank LaRue TenBroeck, a former Asbury Park mayor. The park contains a memorial grove for the Pulse nightclub shooting. Plans have been considered to add a dog park.
- Locust Drive Park - Small triangular park bordered by Fifth Avenue, Locust Drive, and Bridge Street.
- Merchant's Square Park - Small park in downtown at the intersection of Cookman Avenue and Main Street.
- Springwood Park – A park featuring a playground and pavilion that was established in 2016 adjacent to the Second Baptist Church of Asbury Park, a historically African-American congregation founded in 1885. It is across from Kula Urban Farm and Kula Cafe, an urban farm and small restaurant that grows produce for local restaurants. Springwood Park is home to Music Mondays, weekly live-music outdoor events in the summer months that are hosted by the Asbury Park Music Foundation. The park has been home to political and civil rights rallies.
- Soldiers Park - A triangular park locate on the corner of Grand Avenue and Cookman Avenue, centered by a memorial pedestal with a soldier on top in honor of Union soldiers who died in the Civil War, however the plaque uniquely refers to it as the "War of Rebellion", a name mostly found solely in the South.
- Wesley Lake - Located along the city's southern border between Bond Street and the boardwalk, acting as the city's border with Ocean Grove, the lake contains footpaths surrounding the lake, as well as two footbridges, and pedal boat rentals. Historically, the lake contained ten-person swan boats and later four-person motor-powered boats that ran along a track throughout the lake. In 2011, three-person pedal boats were added, in the shape of swans and other birds.

Asbury Park is also home to numerous historical houses and buildings that can still be seen today, as well as containing nearly 50 registered historic sites with Monmouth County. Of these, four are also designated national historical landmarks. These include the tourable Stephen Crane House, residence of author Stephen Crane and home to the Asbury Park Historical Society; the George Wurts home, the Trinity Episcopal Church, the Asbury Park Convention Hall, the Palace Merry-Go-Round, the Steinbach Brothers Store, and the Winsor Building.

== Government ==
=== Local government ===
The City of Asbury Park is governed within the Faulkner Act, formally known as the Optional Municipal Charter Law, under the Council-Manager form of government. The city is one of 71 municipalities (of the 564) statewide governed under this form. The city was previously governed under the 1923 Municipal Manager Law form of municipal government until voters approved the Council-Manager form in 2013. The government is comprised of a five-member City Council with a directly elected mayor and four council positions all elected at-large in non-partisan elections, to serve four-year terms of office on a staggered basis in elections held in even years as part of the November general election.

The form of government was chosen based on the final report issued in August 2013 by a Charter Study Commission that had narrowed its options to the weak Mayor Council-Manager form or the strong Mayor Faulkner Act form, ultimately choosing to recommend the Council-Manager form as it would retain desired aspects of the 1923 Municipal Manager Law (non-partisan voting for an at-large council with a professional manager) while allowing a directly elected mayor, elections in November and grants voters the right to use initiative and referendum. The four winning council candidates in the November 2014 general election drew straws, with two being chosen to serve full four-year terms and two serving for two years. Thereafter, two council seats will be up for election every two years.

As of 2025, the mayor of Asbury Park is John Moor, whose term of office ends December 31, 2026. Members of the Asbury Park City Council are Deputy Mayor Amy Quinn (2028), Angela Ahbez-Anderson (2026), Eileen Chapman (2028) and Barbara "Yvonne" Clayton (2028).

In May 2016, the City Council appointed Eileen Chapman to fill the vacant council seat expiring in December 2016 that had been held by Joe Woerner until he resigned from office.

Myra Campbell, the last mayor under the old form of government, was the first African-American woman to be chosen as mayor when she took office in July 2013.

==== Fire department ====
Asbury Park Fire Department (APFD)
- APFD Logo

Operational area
- State: New Jersey
- City: Asbury Park
- Address: 800 Main Street

Agency overview
- Established: 1887
- Annual calls: ~7,647 (2018)
- Employees: ~54
- EMS level: BLS Transport
- IAFF: L384

Facilities and equipment
- Stations: 1
- Engines: 3 (including spare)
- Trucks: 2 (including spare)
- Rescues: 1
- Ambulances: 3 (including spare)
- Fireboats: 1

Website
- http://www.cityofasburypark.com/APFD

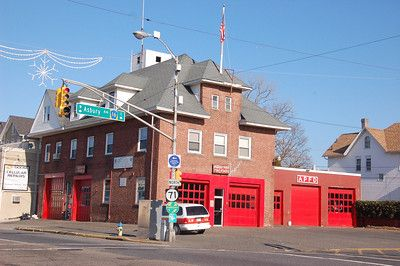
The Asbury Park fire station

Beyond providing emergency services, the Asbury Park Fire Department works to prevent fires and accidents. Department responsibilities include fire code enforcement, arson investigations, as well as fire prevention activities and fire / life safety education programs for children, families, and seniors.

Asbury Park currently has a centrally located fire station (with a new one planned for the future), with one Engine Company, one Ladder Company, two Basic Life Support Ambulances, a fireboat, and a Duty Battalion Chief. The department's apparatus fleet includes three engines (including a spare), two ladder trucks (including a spare), one rescue truck, and two ambulances, in addition to other equipment. The Asbury Park Fire Department employs 53 certified Firefighter/Emergency Medical Technicians.

=== Federal, state, and county representation ===
Asbury Park is located in the 6th Congressional district and is part of New Jersey's 11th state legislative district.

For the 119th United States Congress, New Jersey's 6th congressional district is represented by Frank Pallone (D, Long Branch). New Jersey is represented in the United States Senate by Democrats Cory Booker (Newark, term ends 2027) and Andy Kim (Moorestown, term ends 2031).

For the 2026–2027 session, the 11th legislative district of the New Jersey Legislature is represented in the New Jersey Senate by Vin Gopal (D, Long Branch) and in the General Assembly by Margie Donlon (D, Ocean Township) and Luanne Peterpaul (D, Long Branch).

Monmouth County is governed by a Board of County Commissioners composed of five members who are elected at-large to serve three-year terms of office on a staggered basis, with either one or two seats up for election each year as part of the November general election. At an annual reorganization meeting held in the beginning of January, the board selects one of its members to serve as director and another as deputy director.

As of 2025, Monmouth County's Commissioners are Director Thomas A. Arnone (R, Neptune City, 2025), Susan M. Kiley (R, Hazlet Township, 2027), Erik Anderson (R, Shrewsbury, 2026), Nick DiRocco (R, Wall Township, 2025), and Deputy Director Ross F. Licitra (R, Marlboro Township, 2026).

Constitutional officers elected on a countywide basis are Clerk Christine Giordano Hanlon (R, 2025; Ocean Township), Sheriff Shaun Golden (R, 2025; Howell Township) and Surrogate Rosemarie D. Peters (R, 2026; Middletown Township).

=== Politics ===
United States presidential election results for Asbury Park
Year	Republican		Democratic		Third party(ies)	
Year	No.	%	No.	%	No.	%
2024	1,100	20.08%	4,238	77.36%	140	2.56%
2020	968	16.62%	4,767	81.82%	91	1.56%
2016	746	14.65%	4,179	82.07%	167	3.28%
2012	480	9.91%	4,317	89.08%	49	1.01%
2008	522	9.96%	4,693	89.51%	28	0.53%
2004	759	17.07%	3,659	82.30%	28	0.63%
2000	548	14.59%	3,091	82.27%	118	3.14%
1996	594	15.63%	3,019	79.43%	188	4.95%
1992	865	21.65%	2,738	68.54%	392	9.81%

As of March 2011, there were a total of 7,404 registered voters in Asbury Park, of which 2,723 (36.8%) were registered as Democrats, 464 (6.3%) were registered as Republicans and 4,209 (56.8%) were registered as Unaffiliated. There were 8 voters registered as Libertarians or Greens.

Gubernatorial election results for Asbury Park
Year	Republican		Democratic		Third party(ies)	
Year	No.	%	No.	%	No.	%
2025	740	16.84%	3,616	82.28%	39	0.89%
2021	639	21.05%	2,353	77.50%	44	1.45%
2017	436	16.53%	2,153	81.65%	48	1.82%
2013	682	30.92%	1,488	67.45%	36	1.63%
2009	440	19.32%	1,728	75.89%	109	4.79%
2005	435	17.63%	1,970	79.82%	63	2.55%

In the 2020 presidential election, Democrat Joe Biden received 81.8% of the vote (4,767 votes), ahead of Republican Donald Trump with 16.6% (968 votes), and other candidates with 1.6% (91 cast), among the 5,826 votes cast by the city's 8,600 registered voters (183 ballots were spoiled) for a turnout of 70%. In the 2016 presidential election, Democrat Hillary Clinton received 82.1% (4,179 votes), ahead of Republican Donald Trump with 14.7% (746 votes), and other candidates with 3.3% (167 votes), among the 5,092 votes cast by the city's 9,218 registered voters (268 ballot were spoiled) for a turnout of 58%. In the 2012 presidential election, Democrat Barack Obama received 89.1% of the vote (4,317 cast), ahead of Republican Mitt Romney with 9.9% (480 votes), and other candidates with 1.0% (49 votes), among the 4,896 ballots cast by the city's 8,486 registered voters (50 ballots were spoiled), for a turnout of 57.7%. In the 2008 presidential election, Democrat Barack Obama received 87.4% of the vote (4,693 cast), ahead of Republican John McCain with 9.7% (522 votes) and other candidates with 0.5% (28 votes), among the 5,372 ballots cast by the city's 8,429 registered voters, for a turnout of 63.7%.

In the 2013 gubernatorial election, Democrat Barbara Buono received 67.5% of the vote (1,488 cast), ahead of Republican Chris Christie with 30.9% (682 votes), and other candidates with 1.6% (36 votes), among the 2,287 ballots cast by the city's 8,819 registered voters (81 ballots were spoiled), for a turnout of 25.9%. In the 2009 gubernatorial election, Democrat Jon Corzine received 75.1% of the vote (1,728 ballots cast), ahead of Republican Chris Christie with 19.1% (440 votes), Independent Chris Daggett with 4.3% (100 votes) and other candidates with 0.4% (9 votes), among the 2,301 ballots cast by the city's 7,692 registered voters, yielding a 29.9% turnout.

United States Senate election results for Asbury Park1
Year	Republican		Democratic		Third party(ies)	
Year	No.	%	No.	%	No.	%
2024	964	18.80%	3,970	77.42%	194	3.78%
2018	646	16.57%	3,101	79.53%	152	3.90%
2012	466	10.73%	3,793	87.38%	82	1.89%
2006	385	18.28%	1,680	79.77%	41	1.95%

United States Senate election results for Asbury Park2
Year	Republican		Democratic		Third party(ies)	
Year	No.	%	No.	%	No.	%
2020	954	16.58%	4,650	80.80%	151	2.62%
2014	405	14.76%	2,278	83.05%	60	2.19%
2013	260	15.31%	1,426	83.98%	12	0.71%
2008	469	10.31%	3,970	87.29%	109	2.40%

== Historic district ==
- Asbury Park Commercial Historic District
- U.S. National Register of Historic Places
- U.S. Historic district
- New Jersey Register of Historic Places
- Location: Roughly bounded by 500, 600, 700 blocks of Cookman and Mattison avenues and Bond Street between Lake and Bangs avenues
- NRHP reference No.: 14000536
- NJRHP No.: 3992

Significant dates
- Added to NRHP: September 30, 2014
- Designated NJRHP: July 10, 2014

The Asbury Park Commercial Historic District is a historic district located primarily along Cookman and Mattison avenues and Bond and Emory streets between Lake and Bangs avenues. The district was added to the National Register of Historic Places on September 30, 2014, for its significance in commerce and entertainment.

There are three other historic districts that fall under the Monmouth County Historic Districts register.

The first is the Waterfront Resort Historic District, which encompasses the boardwalk, the beach, Ocean Avenue, green space, and the buildings close by that are associated with Asbury Park's status as a seaside resort. The district boundaries are, roughly the Atlantic Ocean to the east, Ocean Avenue to the west, Wesley Lake to the south, and the Deal Lake to the north. Within the district are various historical buildings and sites, including the boardwalks, four bathing pavilions, Palace Amusements, the Stone Pony, the Berkeley-Carteret Hotel, the Asbury Park Convention Hall, and the Casino Amusements.

The second district is the Library Square Historic District, which is a residential/civic district laid out on a grid system of wide tree-lined streets. This district is a mix of late 19th and early 20th century residential architecture, churches, hotels, the public library, with much of it centered on the Library Square green space. The district comprises the significant architecture remaining in the vicinity of Library Square and Grand Avenue, which is not interrupted with modern buildings or significantly altered historic structures. This area still reflects founder Bradley's plan for Grand Avenue and Library Square with wide tree-lined streets. The district roughly includes all properties fronting Library Square, then adding one block east up First Avenue between Bergh and Heck streets, and one block west up Second Avenue between Emory and Grand avenues. The properties fronting Grand Avenue between Third and Sewall avenues are also included.

Lastly is the Sunset Lake Historic District, which is comprised of a residential neighborhood laid out on a grid system of wide tree-lined streets and a park. The houses in the district range from the late 19th to early 20th century revivals, with houses dating from the early 20th century being the most common. The district includes the entire Sunset Lake Park between Main and Webb streets. The southern border of the district is the Fifth Avenue side of the park, but not including the buildings on Fifth Avenue. The district also includes, roughly Sixth Avenue between Park Avenue and Main Street, Seventh Avenue between Grand Avenue and Main Street, and Eighth Avenue between Grand Avenue and Main Street.

== Education ==
=== Public schools ===
The Asbury Park Public Schools serve students in pre-kindergarten through twelfth grade. The district is one of 31 former Abbott districts statewide that were established pursuant to the decision by the New Jersey Supreme Court in Abbott v. Burke which are now referred to as "SDA Districts" based on the requirement for the state to cover all costs for school building and renovation projects in these districts under the supervision of the New Jersey Schools Development Authority. As of the 2024–25 school year, the district, comprised of four schools, had an enrollment of 1,482 students and 147.5 classroom teachers (on an FTE basis), for a student–teacher ratio of 10.1:1. Schools in the district (with 2024-25 enrollment data from the National Center for Education Statistics) are Bradley Elementary School with 443 students in grades PreK–2, Thurgood Marshall Elementary School with 345 students in grades 3–5, Dr. Martin Luther King Jr. Middle School with 195 students in grades 6–8 and Asbury Park High School with 379 students in grades 9–12.

Students from Allenhurst, Deal and Interlaken had all attended the Asbury Park schools through sending/receiving relationships that ended by the 2017–18 school year.

In March 2011, the state monitor overseeing the district's finances ordered that Barack Obama Elementary School be closed after the end of the 2010–2011 school year, citing a 35% decline in enrollment in the district during the prior 10 years. Students currently attending the school would be reallocated to the district's two other elementary schools, with those going into fifth grade assigned to attend middle school. During the summer of 2012, the school board approved funding for development plans to house the Board of Education in the vacant Barack Obama Elementary School. The school board awarded $894,000 to an architect firm to handle the renovation design and subsequent project bids. The estimated cost of the renovation was $1.6 million.

In 2006, Asbury Park's Board of Education was affected by the city's decision to redevelop waterfront property with eminent domain. In the case Asbury Park Board of Education v. City of Asbury Park and Asbury Partners, LLC, the New Jersey Superior Court, Appellate Division affirmed a ruling in favor of eminent domain of the Board of Education building on Lake Avenue. The Board of Education moved to the third and fourth floors of 603 Mattison Avenue, the former Asbury Park Press building, where it paid $189,327 in rent per year.

In February 2007, the offices of the Asbury Park Board of Education were raided by investigators from the State Attorney General's office, prompted by allegations of corruption and misuse of funds.

Per-student expenditures in Asbury Park have generated statewide controversy for several years. In 2006, The New York Times reported that Asbury Park "spends more than $18,000 per student each year, the highest amount in the state." In both 2010 and 2011, the Asbury Park K–12 school district had the highest per-student expenditure in the state. As of the 2010 school reports, the high school has not met goals mandated by the No Child Left Behind Act and has been classified as "In Need of Improvement" for six years.

=== Charter schools ===
The Hope Academy Charter School, founded in 2001, is an alternative public school choice that serves students in kindergarten through eighth grade. Admission is based on a lottery of submitted applications, with priority given to Asbury Park residents and siblings of existing students.

Students from Asbury Park in ninth through twelfth grades may also attend Academy Charter High School, located in Lake Como, which also serves residents of Allenhurst, Avon-by-the-Sea, Belmar, Bradley Beach, Deal, Interlaken and Lake Como, and accepts students on a lottery basis.

== Crime ==
While 8 of the 17 murders in Monmouth County in 2006 took place in Asbury Park, and 7 of the county's 14 murders in 2007, by 2008 there was only one murder in Asbury Park and five in the whole county. The city's police had added 19 officers since 2003 and expanded its street crime unit. After a spike in gang violence, violent crime had decreased by almost 20% from 2006 to 2008.

In the calendar year through August 26, 2013, Asbury Park has had 6 homicides; there have also been 17 people non-fatally injured in shooting incidents.

In February 2014, "Operation Dead End" arrested gang members of the Crips and Bloods; one Asbury Park patrol officer was arrested for aiding gang members.

On June 16, 2015, Asbury Park police officers arrested a Neptune Township off-duty police officer for the murder of his ex-wife on an Asbury Park street in broad daylight.

As of 2023, the Asbury Park Police Department has a staff of 27. The department is broken down into various divisions: the Traffic Safety Unit has 2 officers, the Patrol Division has 8 officers, the Office of Professional Standards & Accountability has 4 officers, the Investigative Section has 3 officers, 1 Community Relations officer, 3 School Resource Officers, and 6 department head officers.

Asbury Park's crime statistics
Year	Crime index total	Violent crime	Non-violent Crime	Crime rate per 1000	Violent crime Rate per 1000	Non-violent crime Rate per 1000	Murder	Rape	Robbery	Aggravated assault	Ref.
1994	1740	386	1354	103.6	23.0	80.6	2	20	175	189	
1995	1461	290	1171	93.6	18.6	75.0	2	11	147	130	
1996	1590	305	1285	101.9	19.5	82.3	2	23	139	141	
1997	1525	357	1168	89.1	20.8	68.2	1	11	190	155	
1998	1240	251	989	72.4	14.7	57.8	0	16	116	119	
1999	1183	302	881	69.4	17.7	51.7	3	16	139	144	
2000	1224	337	887	72.3	19.9	52.4	1	13	161	162	
2001	1431	398	1033	84.5	23.5	61.0	5	14	184	195	
2002	1260	347	913	74.4	20.5	53.9	3	9	172	163	
2003	1293	378	915	77.0	22.5	54.5	2	7	183	186	
2004	1429	360	1069	85.6	21.6	64.0	3	5	196	156	
2005	1313	346	967	78.1	20.6	57.5	3	10	148	185	
2006	1305	387	918	78.5	23.3	55.2	8	7	194	178	
2007	1070	351	719	64.7	21.2	43.5	6	11	184	150	
2008	1265	319	946	76.3	19.2	57.1	1	6	153	159	
2009	1370	353	1017	82.8	21.3	61.5	2	6	178	167	
2010	1491	344	1147	92.5	21.3	71.2	3	13	188	140	
2011	1540	260	1280	95.6	16.1	79.4	4	11	114	131	
2012	1252	247	1005	78.9	15.6	63.3	3	10	84	150	
2013	1106	264	842	69.7	16.6	53.1	6	9	126	123	
2014	1023	209	814	64.5	13.2	51.3	1	13	85	110	
2015	972	232	740	61.1	14.6	46.5	3	9	92	128	
2016	947	223	724	59.9	14.1	45.8	2	7	101	113	
2017	959	213	746	59.5	13.2	46.3	2	15	82	114	
2018	827	174	653	52.7	11.1	41.5	3	10	54	107	
2019	704	179	525	44.8	11.4	33.4	2	10	47	120	
2020	713	188	525	45.4	12.0	33.4	1	12	48	127	

== Public health ==
Nearby hospitals include Jersey Shore University Medical Center and Monmouth Medical Center.

From before 1990 to 2015, there were 904 reported cases of HIV/AIDS in Asbury Park. Additionally, there were 418 AIDS-related deaths and 73 deaths of people who had HIV (without AIDS diagnosis.) In 2014, there were nine new cases and 2015, eight. To help people living with AIDS and their caregivers, a not-for-profit foundation called The Center provides assistance with meals, housing, and transportation.

In 2012, Asbury Park reported 6 cases of syphilis, 59 cases of gonorrhea, and 139 cases of chlamydia.

== Transportation ==
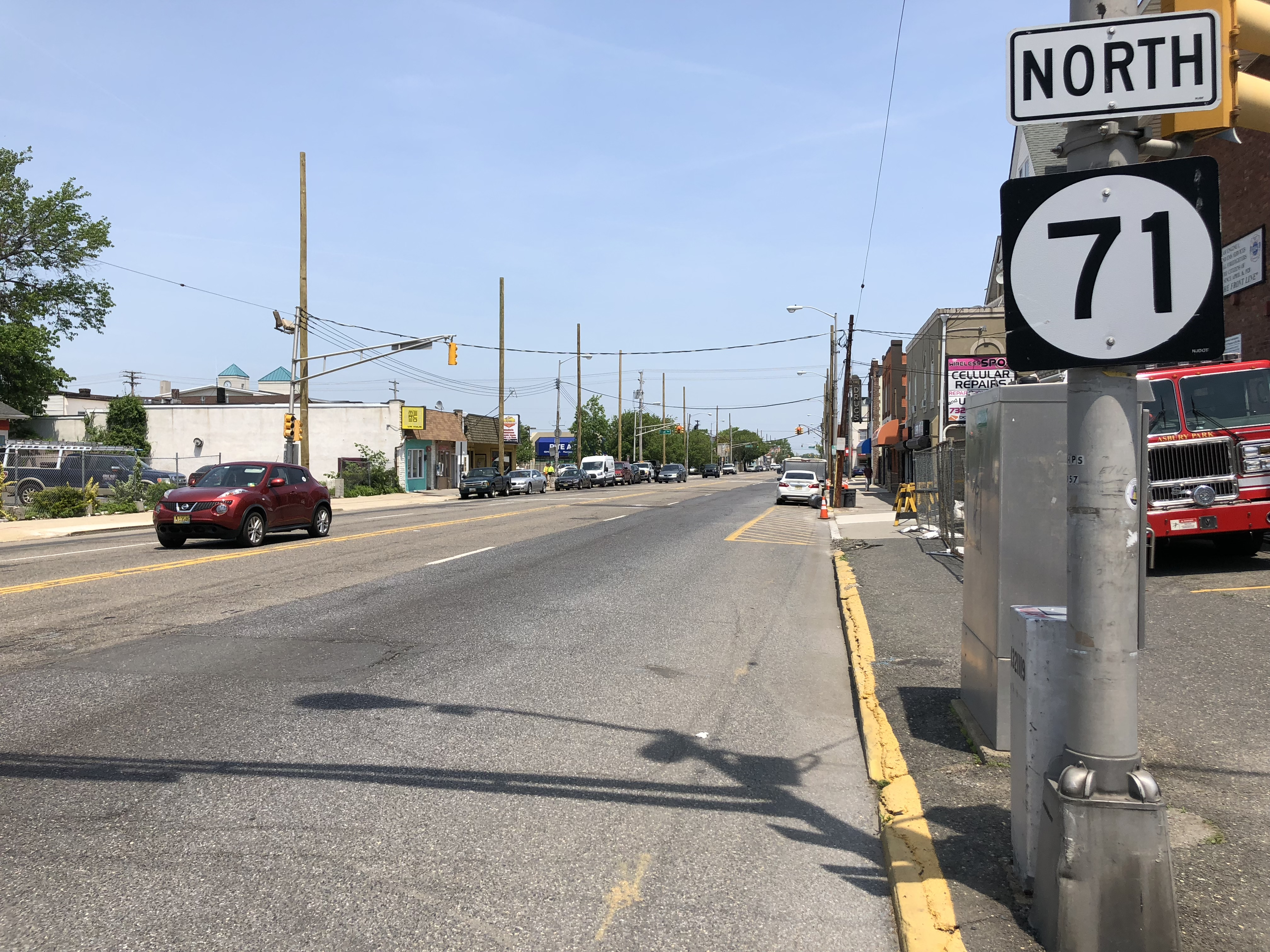
Route 71, the main highway through Asbury Park

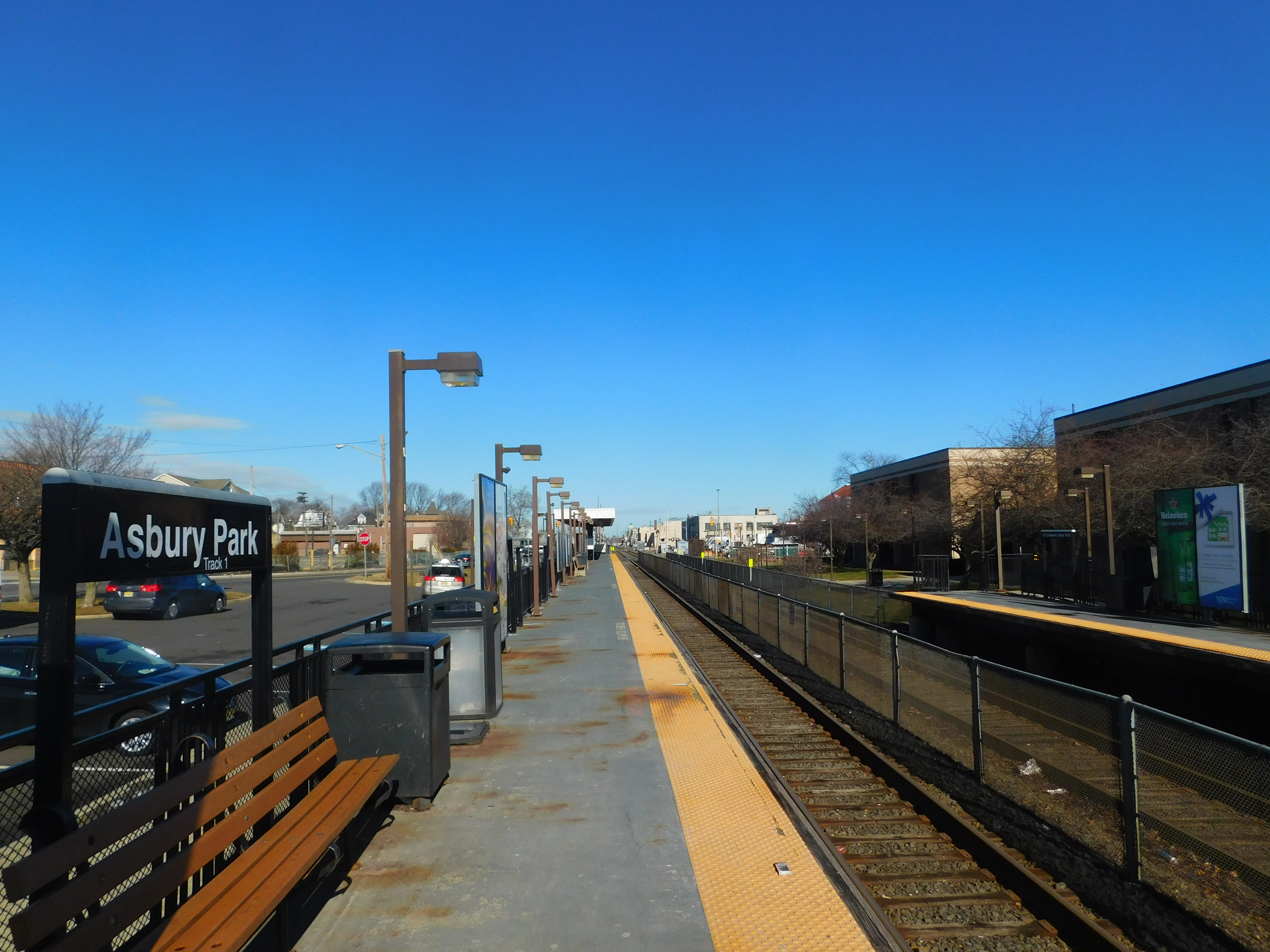
Asbury Park Station, which is served by NJ Transit's North Jersey Coast Line

=== Roads and highways ===
As of May 2010, the city had a total of 36.20 miles (58.26 km) of roadways, of which 33.78 miles (54.36 km) were maintained by the municipality, 0.92 miles (1.48 km) by Monmouth County and 1.50 miles (2.41 km) by the New Jersey Department of Transportation.

The main access road is Route 71 which runs north–south. Other roads that are accessible in neighboring communities include Route 18, Route 33, Route 35 and Route 66. The Garden State Parkway is at least 15 minutes away via either Routes 33 or 66.

=== Public transportation ===
NJ Transit offers commuter rail service from the Asbury Park station. Service is provided on the North Jersey Coast Line, offering trains to Newark Penn Station, Secaucus Junction, New York Penn Station and Hoboken Terminal.

NJ Transit bus routes include the 317 to and from Philadelphia, and local service on the 830, 832, 836 and 837 routes. The "Shore Points" route of Academy Bus Lines provides service between Asbury Park and New York City on a limited schedule.

=== Bike ===
In August 2017, a multi-station bike share program opened in cooperation with Zagster. With six stations in the city, the program is the first of its kind on the Jersey Shore.

== Climate ==
According to the Köppen climate classification system, Asbury Park has a Humid subtropical climate (Cfa).

Climate data for Asbury Park (40.2203, -74.0119), Elevation 16 ft (5 m), 1991–2020 normals, extremes 1981–2022
Month	Jan	Feb	Mar	Apr	May	Jun	Jul	Aug	Sep	Oct	Nov	Dec	Year
Record high °F (°C)	71.6 (22.0)	78.8 (26.0)	82.2 (27.9)	89.2 (31.8)	95.0 (35.0)	96.8 (36.0)	100.0 (37.8)	100.4 (38.0)	97.5 (36.4)	93.8 (34.3)	80.9 (27.2)	75.1 (23.9)	100.4 (38.0)
Mean daily maximum °F (°C)	40.9 (4.9)	42.6 (5.9)	48.6 (9.2)	58.8 (14.9)	68.4 (20.2)	77.8 (25.4)	83.3 (28.5)	81.7 (27.6)	75.9 (24.4)	65.5 (18.6)	54.9 (12.7)	46.3 (7.9)	62.2 (16.8)
Mean daily minimum °F (°C)	25.8 (−3.4)	27.0 (−2.8)	33.3 (0.7)	42.7 (5.9)	52.3 (11.3)	61.9 (16.6)	67.9 (19.9)	66.6 (19.2)	60.4 (15.8)	48.6 (9.2)	39.0 (3.9)	31.3 (−0.4)	46.5 (8.1)
Record low °F (°C)	−6.3 (−21.3)	0.8 (−17.3)	5.6 (−14.7)	18.2 (−7.7)	34.2 (1.2)	44.5 (6.9)	48.6 (9.2)	45.1 (7.3)	39.3 (4.1)	26.5 (−3.1)	14.9 (−9.5)	−0.1 (−17.8)	−6.3 (−21.3)
Average precipitation inches (mm)	3.79 (96)	3.15 (80)	4.29 (109)	3.89 (99)	3.81 (97)	4.11 (104)	4.20 (107)	4.93 (125)	3.90 (99)	4.24 (108)	3.42 (87)	4.64 (118)	48.35 (1,228)
Average snowfall inches (cm)	8.9 (23)	7.4 (19)	4.1 (10)	0.1 (0.25)	0.0 (0.0)	0.0 (0.0)	0.0 (0.0)	0.0 (0.0)	0.0 (0.0)	0.0 (0.0)	0.3 (0.76)	3.4 (8.6)	24.2 (61)
Average dew point °F (°C)	22.3 (−5.4)	22.9 (−5.1)	28.0 (−2.2)	37.2 (2.9)	48.7 (9.3)	59.4 (15.2)	64.5 (18.1)	64.0 (17.8)	58.5 (14.7)	47.0 (8.3)	36.1 (2.3)	28.2 (−2.1)	43.2 (6.2)
Source 1: PRISM
Source 2: NOHRSC (Snow, 2008/2009 - 2022/2023 normals)

Climate data for Atlantic City, NJ Ocean Water Temperature, 1911–present normals
Month	Jan	Feb	Mar	Apr	May	Jun	Jul	Aug	Sep	Oct	Nov	Dec	Year
Daily mean °F (°C)	39.7 (4.3)	38.5 (3.6)	41.9 (5.5)	48.7 (9.3)	56.4 (13.6)	64.7 (18.2)	68.9 (20.5)	73.1 (22.8)	72.2 (22.3)	64.1 (17.8)	53.6 (12.0)	45.2 (7.3)	55.7 (13.2)
Source: NCEI

== Ecology ==
According to the A. W. Kuchler U.S. potential natural vegetation types, Asbury Park would have a dominant vegetation type of Appalachian Oak (104) with a dominant vegetation form of Eastern Hardwood Forest (25).

== Notable people ==
People who were born in, residents of, or otherwise closely associated with Asbury Park include:

- Bud Abbott (1895–1974), straight man for comedy team of Abbott and Costello, born in Asbury Park
- Soren Sorensen Adams (1879–1963), inventor and manufacturer of novelty products, including the joy buzzer
- Stewart H. Appleby (1890–1964), represented New Jersey's 3rd congressional district from 1925 to 1927
- T. Frank Appleby (1864–1924), represented New Jersey's 3rd congressional district in the United States House of Representatives from 1921 to 1923, and was mayor of Asbury Park from 1908 to 1912
- Dave Aron (1964–2019), recording engineer, live and studio mixer, record producer and musician
- Nicole Atkins (born 1978), singer-songwriter on Columbia Records
- Ronald S. Baron (born 1943), mutual fund manager and investor
- Frederick Bayer (1921–2007), marine biologist who served as curator of the Smithsonian Institution's National Museum of Natural History
- Knowledge Bennett (born 1976), visual artist who has served as Artist-in-Residence at Kean University
- Wilda Bennett (1894–1967), actress
- Richard Biegenwald (1940–2008), serial killer who killed at least nine people, and he is suspected in at least two other murders
- Scott "Bam Bam" Bigelow (1961–2007), professional wrestler
- Elizabeth Ann Blaesing (1919–2005), daughter of Warren G. Harding, the 29th President of the United States, and his mistress, Nan Britton
- Daniel Boyarin (born 1946), historian of religion who is Professor of Talmudic Culture at University of California, Berkeley
- James A. Bradley (1830–1921), financier and real estate developer who founded the city and served as its mayor
- Kurt Braunohler (born 1976), comedian
- Charles H. Brower (1901–1984), advertising executive, copywriter and author
- Billy Brown (born 1944), singer, songwriter, and record producer, who was an original member of the R&B vocal group, Ray, Goodman & Brown
- Ernest "Boom" Carter, drummer who has toured and recorded with, among others, Bruce Springsteen, with whom he played the drums on the song "Born to Run"
- Marie Castello (1915–2008), longtime boardwalk fortuneteller known as "Madam Marie"
- Edna Woolman Chase (1877–1957), editor in chief of Vogue magazine from 1914 to 1952
- James M. Coleman (1924–2014), politician who served in the New Jersey General Assembly and as a judge in New Jersey Superior Court
- Stephen Crane (1871–1900), author of The Red Badge of Courage
- Cookie Cuccurullo (1918–1983), MLB pitcher who played for the Pittsburgh Pirates from 1943 to 1945
- Holmes E. Dager, (1893–1973), U.S. Army major general, born in Asbury Park,
- Danny DeVito (born 1944), actor
- Leon Dolice (1892–1960) artist known for his etchings and pastels of iconic New York buildings, lived in Asbury Park during the 1930s.
- Les Dugan (1921–2002), American football coach who was the first head football coach at Buffalo State College, serving from 1981 to 1985
- Cari Fletcher (born 1994), actress, singer, and songwriter
- Tim Hauser (born 1941), member of The Manhattan Transfer
- Leon Hess (1914–1999), oil magnate and founder of the Hess Corporation, began his business in the city
- Robert Hess (1932–1994), scholar of African history who served as the sixth President of Brooklyn College
- Joey Janela (born 1989), professional wrestler
- Richard Jarecki (1931–2018), physician who won more than $1 million from a string of European casinos after cracking a pattern in roulette wheels
- Lou Liberatore (born 1959), actor, has a second home in Asbury Park
- Robert Melee (born 1966), artist
- Vic Morrow (1929-1982), actor
- Arthur Pryor (1870–1942), bandleader
- Nazreon Reid (born 1999), power forward for the Minnesota Timberwolves team
- Ednah Root (1907–1987), painter, sculptor, textile artist, and philanthropist
- Charles J. Ross (1859–1918), vaudeville performer
- David Sancious (born 1953), early member of the E Street Band
- Arthur Siegel (1923–1994), songwriter
- Thomas S. Smith (1917–2002), former mayor of Asbury Park who served in the New Jersey General Assembly
- Bruce Springsteen (born 1949), singer-songwriter, whose debut album was titled Greetings from Asbury Park, N.J.
- Ja'Sir Taylor (born 1999), American football cornerback for the Los Angeles Chargers of the National Football League
- Lenny Welch (born 1940), pop singer
- Margaret Widdemer (1884–1976), Pulitzer Prize-winning poet
- Wendy Williams (born 1964), talk show host and New York Times bestselling author, born in Asbury Park
- Arthur Augustus Zimmerman (1869–1936), the first world cycling champion, grew up here and owned a hotel after retiring from racing

== In popular culture ==
Palace Amusements and the Tillie mural have featured in numerous works of popular culture. Additional works reference Asbury Park, specifically.

In the song "At Long Last Love" (1938), originally written by Cole Porter for the musical You Never Know (1938), Frank Sinatra sings "Is it Granada I see, or only Asbury Park?"

Bruce Springsteen named his first album "Greetings from Asbury Park, N.J." in 1973 and described his early life there. The artist has also dedicated many songs to Asbury Park such as "4th of July, Asbury Park (Sandy)" and "My City of Ruins" on his 2002 album, The Rising.

The group mewithoutYou references Asbury Park several times on their album Ten Stories (2012). The song "Bear's Vision of St. Agnes" mentions "that tattered rag shop back in Asbury Park", and the song "Fox's Dream of the Log Flume" mentions the pier and sand dunes.

Asbury Park was used for the location filming of the crime drama City by the Sea (2002), starring Robert De Niro, James Franco and Frances McDormand, which was nominally set in Long Beach, New York, where no filming actually took place, according to a disclaimer that was included as part of the closing credits. The film features scenes set on a shabby, dilapidated boardwalk and in a ruined/abandoned casino/arcade building. Residents of both places objected to the way their cities were depicted. Asbury Park appears at the start of the 1999 film Dogma.

The 2006 horror film Dark Ride is set in Asbury Park.

The Season 2 finale of The Sopranos, "Funhouse", originally aired in April 2000, includes several discrete dream sequences dreamed by Tony that take place on the Asbury Park Boardwalk, including Madame Marie's as well as Tony and Pauly playing cards at a table in the empty hall of the Convention Center. The episode's title alludes to the Palace, which is also shown.

In a 1955 episode of The Honeymooners ("Better Living Though TV"), Alice Kramden ridicules husband Ralph Kramden's seemingly never-ending parade of failed get-rich-quick schemes, including his investment in "the uranium field in Asbury Park".

Asbury Park is the setting of the Nickelodeon series Erin & Aaron.

Routine Maintenance, a concept album and the second from the musical act Aaron West and the Roaring Twenties, features the titular character working as a painter in Asbury Park.

== See also ==
- SS Asbury Park, a coastal steamship that operated between the northern New Jersey shore and New York City from 1904 to 1918

Preceded by Loch Arbour	Beaches of New Jersey	Succeeded by Ocean Grove
