= Asbury Park FC =

American clothing company

Asbury Park Football Club is an American clothing company, heavily inspired by the styles of soccer team kits. They produce kits for a fictional team of the same name, based in Asbury Park, New Jersey.

== History ==
Asbury Park FC was founded in 2014.
