= Allentown, Pennsylvania (disambiguation) =

Allentown, Pennsylvania may refer to:

- Allentown, Pennsylvania, a city in Lehigh County, Pennsylvania
  - Allentown metropolitan area, containing the city of Allentown
- Allentown, Allegheny County, Pennsylvania, an unrelated neighborhood in the city of Pittsburgh

== See also ==
- Allentown (disambiguation)
- Allen Township, Pennsylvania (disambiguation)
