= Walnford, New Jersey =

Populated place in Monmouth County, New Jersey, US

- Unincorporated community
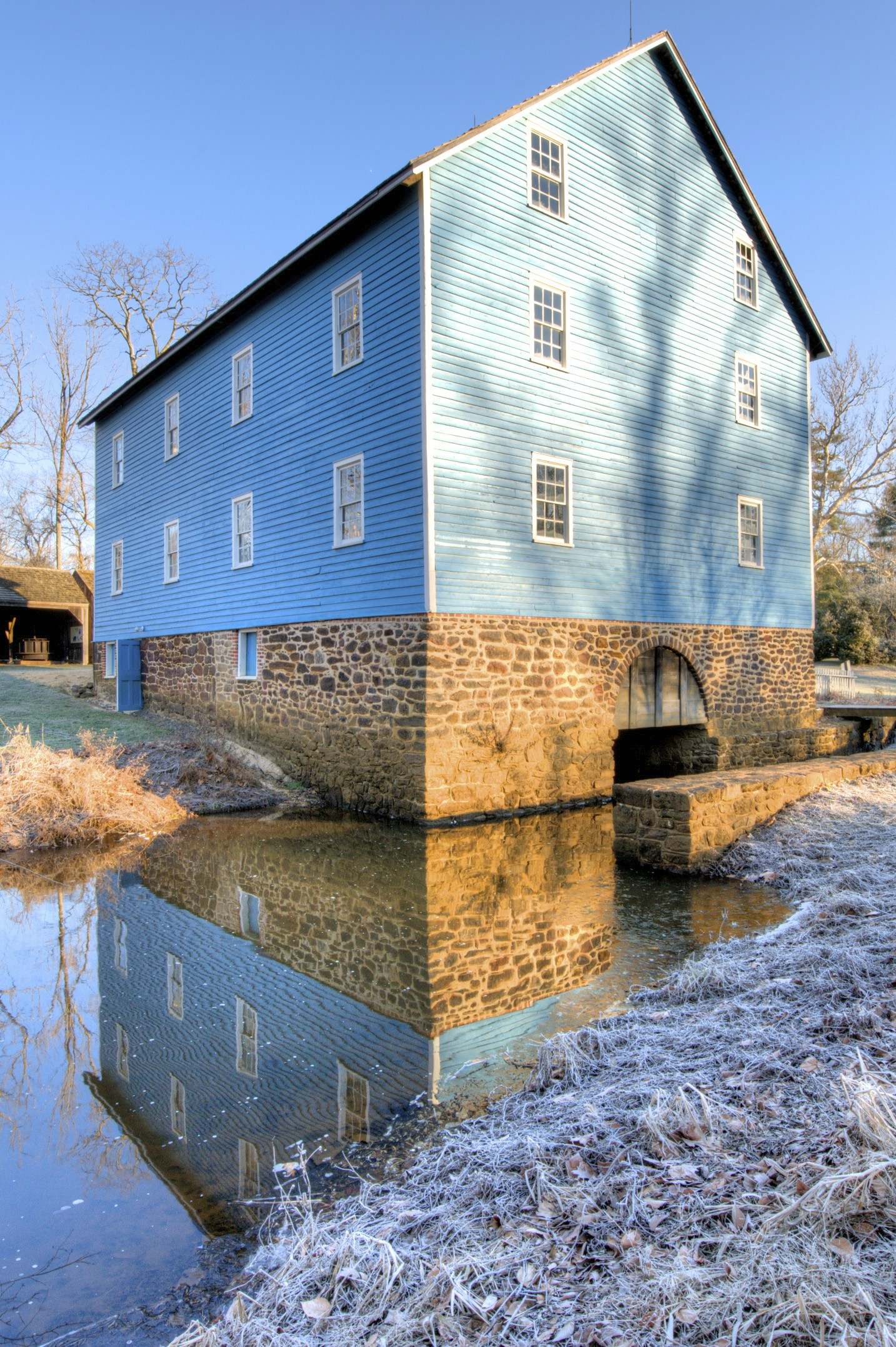
- Mill at Historic Walnford

- Location within Monmouth County, New Jersey Location within New Jersey Location within the United States
- Coordinates: 40°08′04″N 74°33′36″W
- Country: United States
- State: New Jersey
- County: Monmouth
- Township: Upper Freehold
- Named for: Richard Waln
- Elevation: 46 ft (14 m)
- Time zone: UTC−05:00 (Eastern (EST))
  - Summer (DST): UTC−04:00 (EDT)
- GNIS feature ID: 881507

Walnford is an unincorporated community located along Crosswicks Creek within Upper Freehold Township in Monmouth County, in the U.S. state of New Jersey. Walnford was named for Richard Waln, the original owner of the town site.

Historic Walnford is an open-air museum operated by the Monmouth County Park System. It is part of Crosswicks Creek Park.

== History ==
In 1772, Richard Waln (1737–1809), a Philadelphia merchant, purchased several mills in the area, which he then named Walnford. He built a two and one-half story house here in 1773. The property was inherited by his son, Nicolas Waln, and his descendants continued to live here for nearly 200 years.

== Historic district ==
- Walnford
- U.S. National Register of Historic Places
- U.S. Historic district
- New Jersey Register of Historic Places
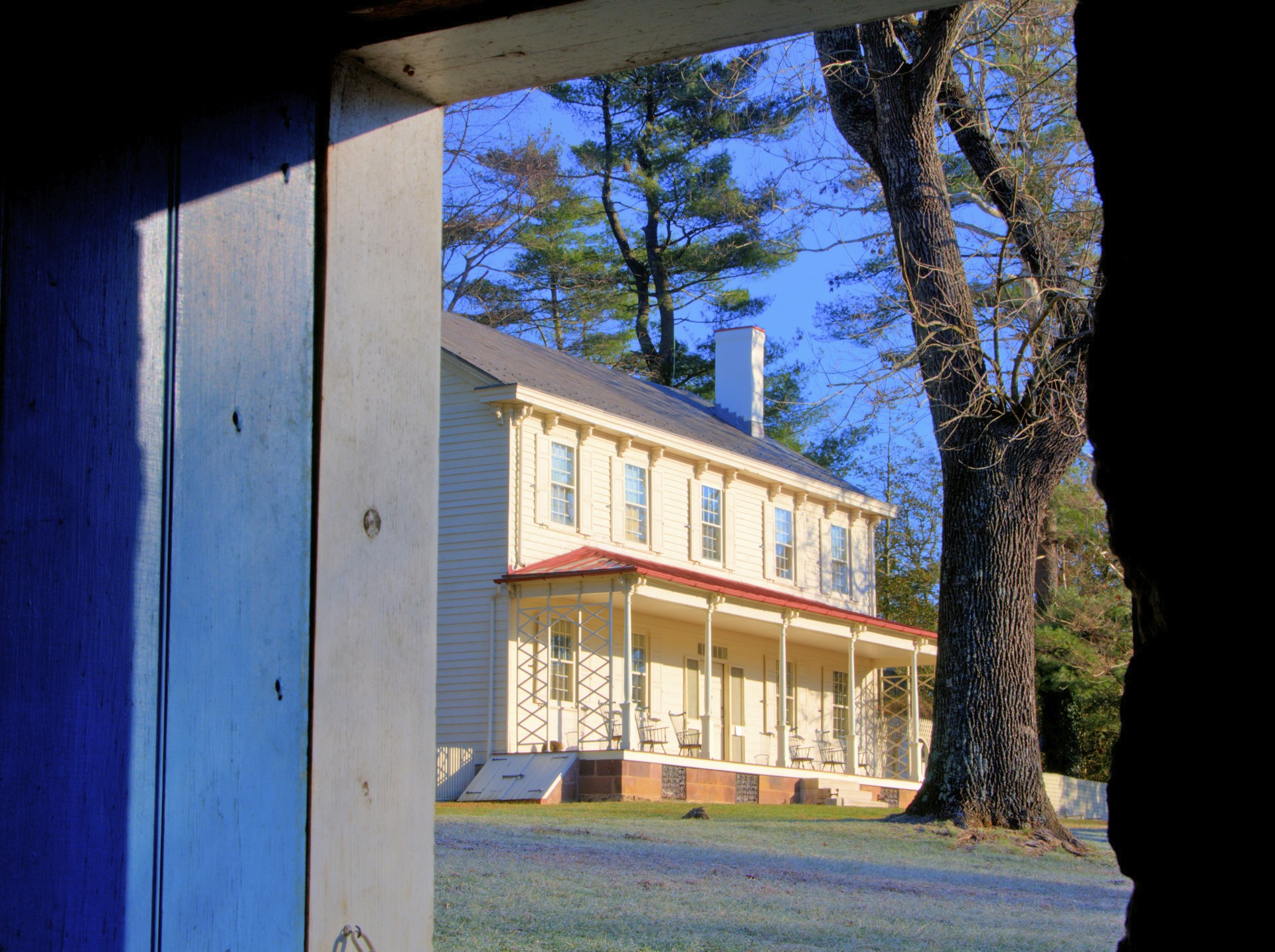
- Waln House, built 1773
- Nearest city: Allentown, New Jersey
- Area: 50 acres (20 ha)
- Architectural style: Georgian
- NRHP reference No.: 76001167
- NJRHP No.: 2070

Significant dates
- Added to NRHP: June 29, 1976
- Designated NJRHP: May 8, 1975

The Walnford Historic District is a 50-acre (20 ha) historic district encompassing the community along Walnford-Davis Station Road and Hill Road. It was added to the National Register of Historic Places on June 29, 1976 for its significance in agriculture and commerce. The district includes 16 contributing buildings and one contributing structure. It features the house built by Richard Waln in 1773, and the grist mill on Crosswicks Creek.

== See also ==
- National Register of Historic Places listings in Monmouth County, New Jersey
- List of museums in New Jersey
