= Allentown =

Allentown may refer to:

== Places ==
- Allentown, California, now called Toadtown, California
- Allentown, Georgia, a city in four counties in Georgia
- Allentown, Illinois, an unincorporated community in Tazewell County
- Allentown, New Jersey, a borough in Monmouth County
- Allentown, Buffalo, a neighborhood in Buffalo, New York
- Allentown, a hamlet in the town of Alma, New York in Allegany County
- Allentown, a hamlet in the town of Hadley, New York in Saratoga County
- Allentown, Ohio, an unincorporated community
- Allentown, Allegheny County, Pennsylvania, a neighborhood of Pittsburgh, Pennsylvania
- Allentown, Pennsylvania, a city in eastern Pennsylvania
- Allentown-Bethlehem-Easton metropolitan area, a metropolitan area also known as the Lehigh Valley
- Allentown, Washington, a neighborhood in Tukwila, Washington

== Music ==
- "Allentown" (song), by American singer Billy Joel (1982) about Allentown, Pennsylvania

== Sports ==
- Allentown Ambassadors (1997-2003), a defunct independent baseball team
- Allentown Jets (1958-1981), a defunct minor league basketball team

== See also ==
- "Allentown Jail", a folk-style song written by American Irving Gordon
- Allen (disambiguation)
- Allenton (disambiguation)
- Allensworth (disambiguation)
- Allenstown (disambiguation)
