= Allanton =

Allanton is the name of several towns and villages.

== New Zealand ==
- Allanton, New Zealand, a small township south of Dunedin in the South Island

== Scotland ==
- Allanton, Scottish Borders, a small village between Duns and Berwick-upon-Tweed
- Allanton, Dumfries and Galloway, a small village between Dumfries and Thornhill, Stirling
- Allanton, North Lanarkshire, a village between Wishaw and Shotts
- Allanton, South Lanarkshire, a small village on the outskirts of Hamilton

== See also ==
- Allenton (disambiguation)
- Allentown (disambiguation)
