= Nelsonville, New Jersey =

Populated place in Monmouth County, New Jersey, US

- Unincorporated community
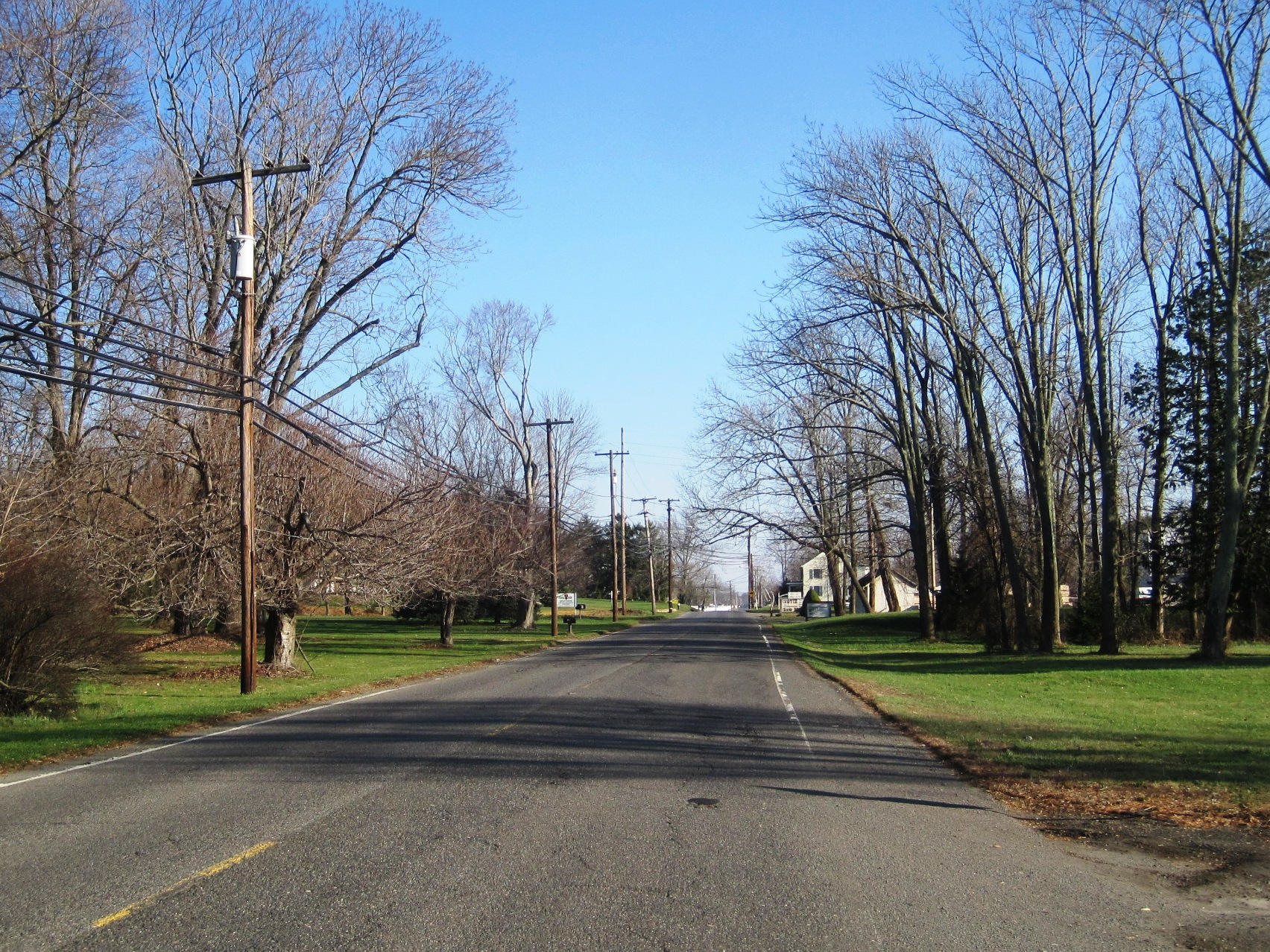
- Heading east through Nelsonville on CR 526

- Location in Monmouth County. Inset: Location of county within the state of New Jersey Nelsonville (New Jersey) Nelsonville (the United States)
- Coordinates: 40°10′13″N 74°32′06″W
- Country: United States
- State: New Jersey
- County: Monmouth
- Township: Upper Freehold
- Named for: Charles Nelson
- Elevation: 112 ft (34 m)
- GNIS feature ID: 878706

Nelsonville (formerly Newell and Imlaystown Station) is an unincorporated community located within Upper Freehold Township in Monmouth County, in the U.S. state of New Jersey. The settlement is located on County Route 526 between Allentown and Imlaystown where it intersects the former Pemberton and Hightstown Railroad. The site was the location of the Newell post office established in 1883 (removed in 1923). The area was originally known as Imlaystown Station as it was the closest spot to the eponymous town along the railroad. In 1887, the area was renamed to Nelsonville for the local postmaster, Charles Nelson. Other industries in the area at the time included a wagon shop and a cider mill. Today, several agricultural and light industries surround the settlement in addition to some single-family homes. The right-of-way of the former railroad is being reconstructed as the Union Transportation Trail.
