= New Canton =

New Canton can refer to:

- New Canton, Illinois
- New Canton, New Jersey
- New Canton, Virginia
