= Cream Ridge Winery =

American winery located in New Jersey

Coordinates: 40.151044°N 74.548780°W

- Location: 145 County Road 539, Cream Ridge, New Jersey, USA
- Coordinates: 40.151044 N, 74.548780 W
- First vines planted: 1987
- Opened to the public: 1988
- Key people: Tom & Joan Amabile (owners)
- Area cultivated: 14
- Cases/yr: 5,000 (2011)
- Known for: Cherry wine
- Other attractions: Pet-friendly
- Distribution: On-site, wine festivals, NJ farmers' markets, NJ restaurants, home shipment
- Tasting: Daily tastings
- Website: http://www.creamridgewinery.com/

Cream Ridge Winery is a winery in the Cream Ridge section of Upper Freehold Township in Monmouth County, New Jersey. The vineyard was first planted in 1987, and opened to the public in 1988. Cream Ridge has 14 acres of grapes under cultivation, and produces 5,000 cases of wine per year. The winery is named for the community where it is located.

== Wines ==
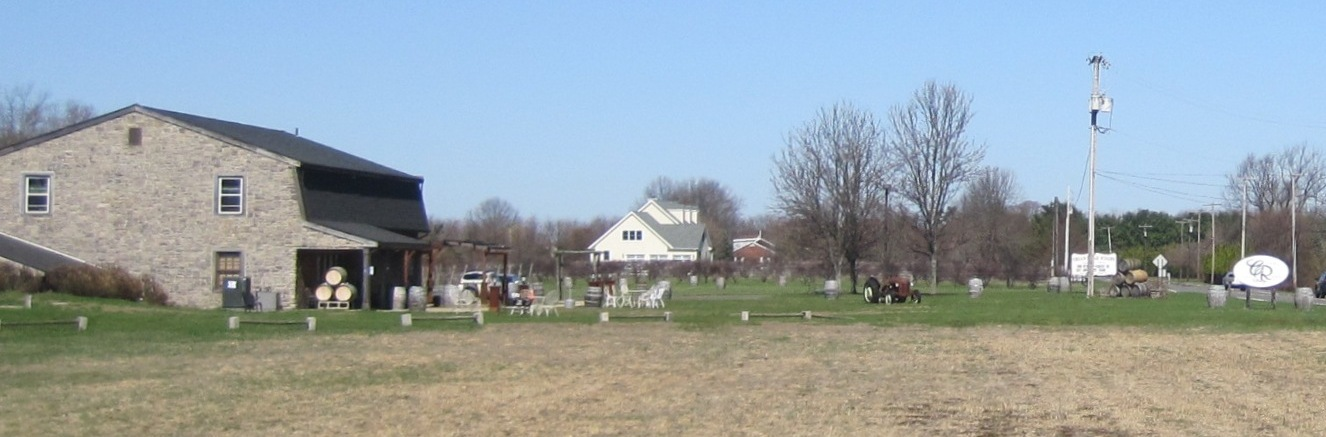
Side view of main building and yard of the winery

Cream Ridge Winery produces wine from Barbera, Cabernet Franc, Cabernet Sauvignon, Chambourcin, Chardonnay, Durif (Petite Sirah), Fredonia, Merlot, Muscat blanc, Niagara, Pinot gris, Pinot noir, Riesling, Sangiovese, Sauvignon blanc, Syrah, Vidal blanc, and Zinfandel grapes. Cream Ridge also makes fruit wines from almonds, apricots, beach plums, blackberries, black currants, blueberries, cherries, cranberries, kiwifruit, limes, mangoes, pineapples, and raspberries, and dessert wines using chocolate and espresso. It is the only winery in New Jersey to produce wine from apricots, and is the only New Jersey winery to make coffee-based wines. Cream Ridge is best known for its signature cherry wine. The winery is not located in one of New Jersey's three viticultural areas.

== Licensing and associations ==
Cream Ridge has a plenary winery license from the New Jersey Division of Alcoholic Beverage Control, which allows it to produce an unrestricted amount of wine, operate up to 15 off-premises sales rooms, and ship up to 12 cases per year to consumers in-state or out-of-state. The winery is a member of the Garden State Wine Growers Association.

== See also ==
- New Jersey wine
