= Allentown Mill =

- U.S. National Register of Historic Places
- New Jersey Register of Historic Places
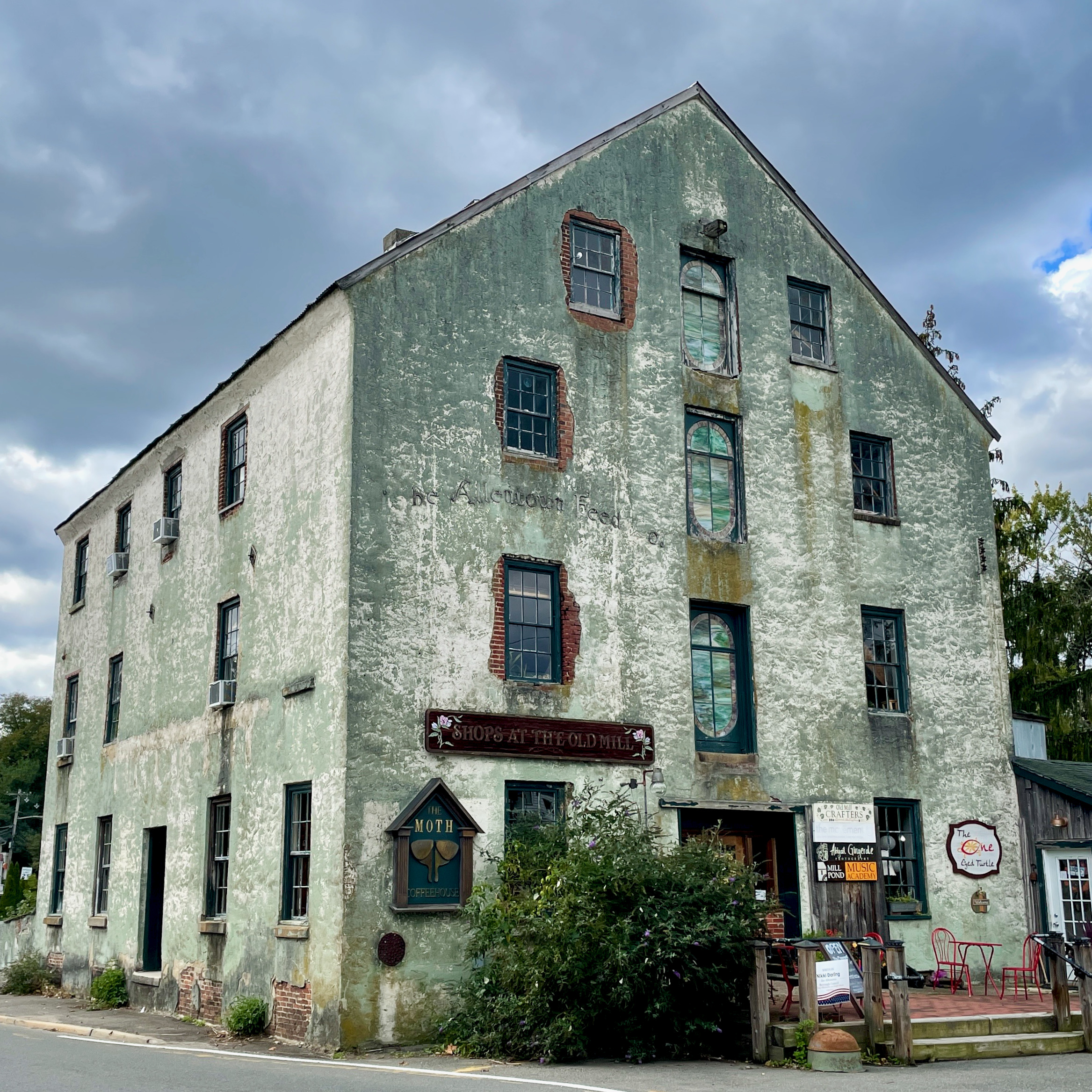

- Location within Monmouth County, New Jersey Location within New Jersey Location within the United States
- Location: 42 South Main Street, Allentown, New Jersey
- Coordinates: 40°10′34″N 74°35′13″W
- Area: 0.5 acres (0.20 ha)
- Built: 1855
- Architect: Abel Cafferty
- NRHP reference No.: 78001774
- NJRHP No.: 1950

Significant dates
- Added to NRHP: February 14, 1978
- Designated NJRHP: August 19, 1977

Allentown Mill is a historic grist mill located at 42 South Main Street in Allentown, a borough in Monmouth County, New Jersey. The mill was built in 1855, replacing the original mill built here by Nathan Allen in 1706. It was added to the National Register of Historic Places on February 14, 1978 for its significance in agriculture, commerce, and industry.

== See also ==
- National Register of Historic Places listings in Monmouth County, New Jersey
