= Horse Park of New Jersey =

Coordinates: 40.193205°N 74.498207°W

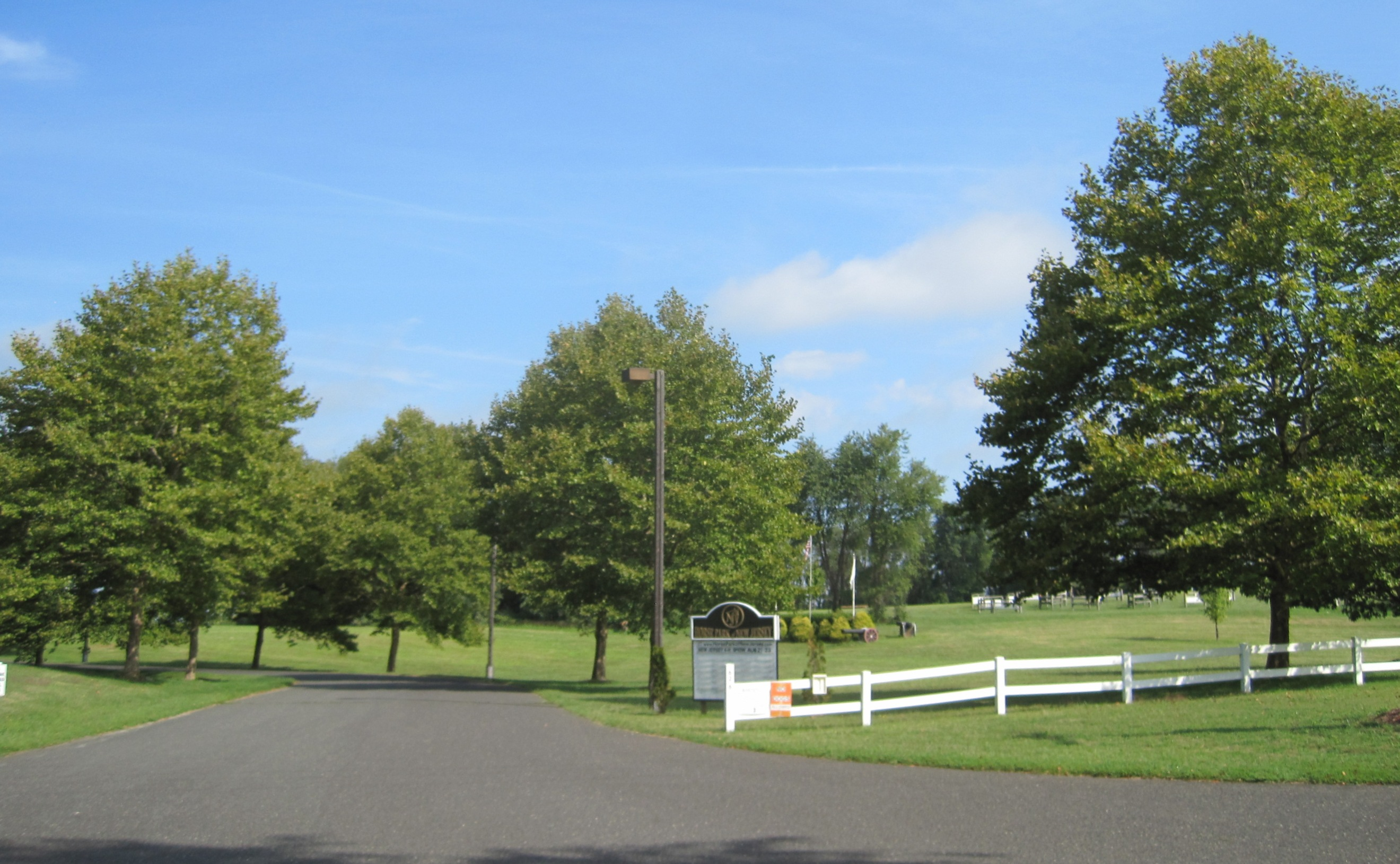
Entrance to the park on CR 524

The Horse Park of New Jersey is a 185-acre (75 ha) park that holds equestrian events, located in Upper Freehold, in Monmouth County, New Jersey, United States, with an Allentown address.

== History ==
The Horse Park of New Jersey was conceived by equestrian enthusiasts concerned about the dwindling amount of land dedicated to their interests and activities. The Horse Park opened in 1987 on land initially purchased by the New Jersey Department of Environmental Protection with Green Acres funds and centrally located in Monmouth County in the area's equine-oriented countryside, based on the input of the state's Equine Advisory Board.

== Facilities ==
The Horse Park of New Jersey is located on County Route 524, seven miles from exit 7A of the New Jersey Turnpike and one mile from exit 11 of I-195. The park is approximately a 50-minute drive from Philadelphia and just over one hour from New York City.

The park currently has:

- 276 stalls in permanent buildings
- Two show rings
- Grand prix and carriage dressage arena
- Fenced and lighted schooling ring
- Dressage warm-up ring
- Indoor arena
- Multi-purpose pavilion for sheltered viewing, trade fairs, auctions and clinics
- Secretary's office, including lounge, press room and announcer's booth
