= Upper Freehold Township, New Jersey =

Township in Monmouth County, New Jersey, US

- Township
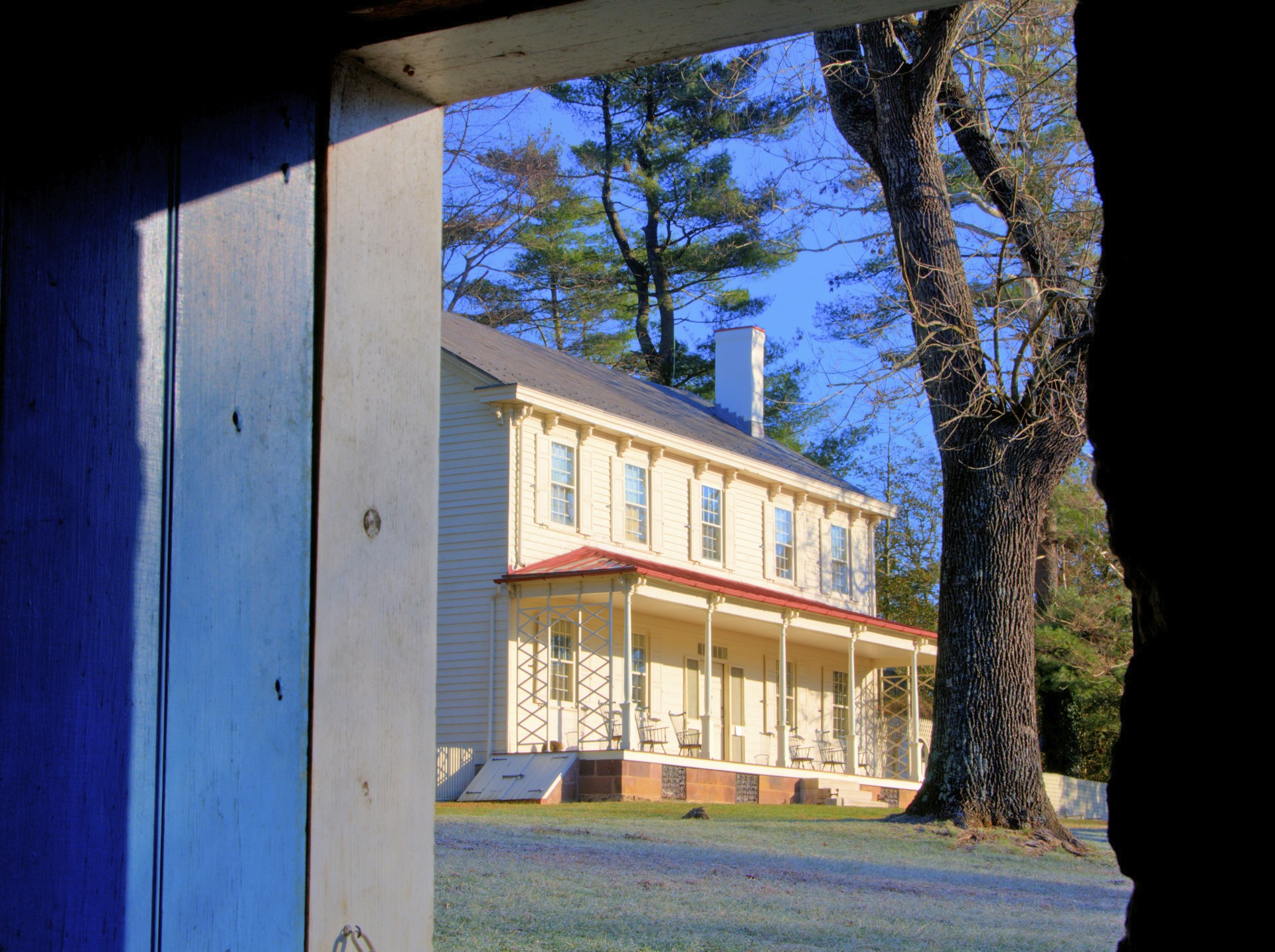
- The historic Waln House

- Seal

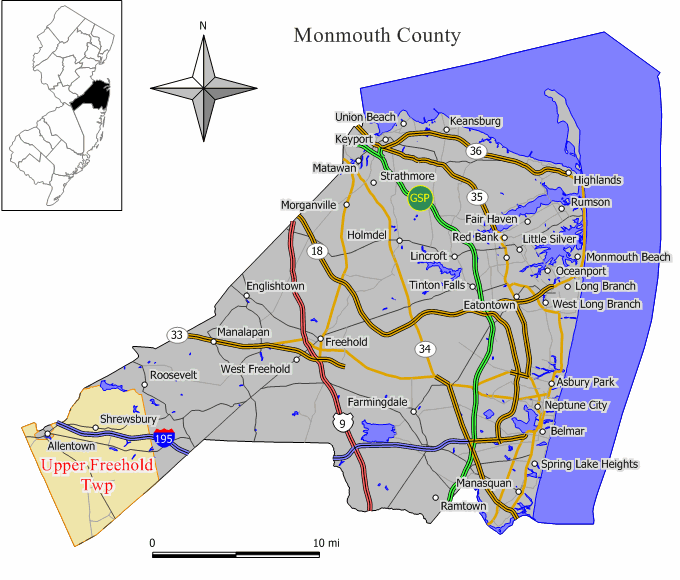
- Location of Upper Freehold Township in Monmouth County highlighted in yellow (right). Inset map: Location of Monmouth County in New Jersey highlighted in black (left).

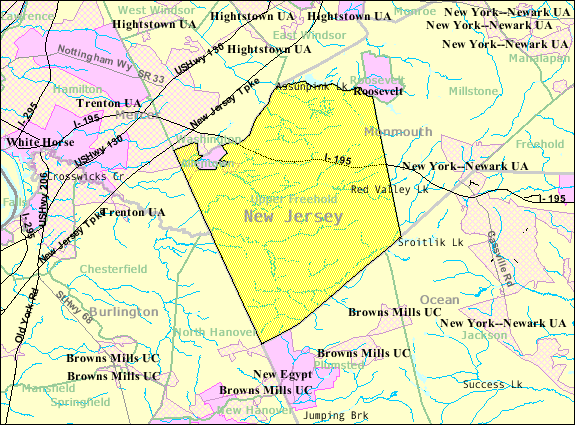
- Census Bureau map of Upper Freehold Township, New Jersey

- Location in Monmouth County Location in New Jersey Location in the United States
- Coordinates: 40.153573°N 74.529315°W
- Country: United States
- State: New Jersey
- County: Monmouth
- Established: 1731
- Incorporated: February 21, 1798

Government
  - Type: Township
  - Body: Township Committee
  - Mayor: Robert Frascella (R, term ends December 31, 2025)
  - Administrator: Dana Tyler
  - Municipal clerk: Dana Tyler

Area
  - Total: 47.37 sq mi (122.68 km^{2})
  - Land: 46.48 sq mi (120.37 km^{2})
  - Water: 0.89 sq mi (2.31 km^{2}) 1.88%
  - Rank: 35th of 565 in state 3rd of 53 in county
- Elevation: 108 ft (33 m)

Population (2020)
  - Total: 7,273
  - Estimate (2023): 7,203
  - Rank: 313th of 565 in state 24th of 53 in county
  - Density: 156.5/sq mi (60.4/km^{2})
  - Rank: 518th of 565 in state 53rd of 53 in county
- Time zone: UTC−05:00 (Eastern (EST))
  - Summer (DST): UTC−04:00 (Eastern (EDT))
- ZIP Code: 08501 - Allentown 08514 - Cream Ridge
- Area code: 609 exchanges: 208, 259, 752, 758
- FIPS code: 3402574900
- GNIS feature ID: 0882114
- Website: www.uftnj.com

Upper Freehold Township is a township in Monmouth County, in the U.S. state of New Jersey. As of the 2020 United States census, the township's population was 7,273, an increase of 371 (+5.4%) from the 2010 census count of 6,902, which in turn reflected an increase of 2,620 (+61.2%) from the 4,282 counted in the 2000 census.

== History ==
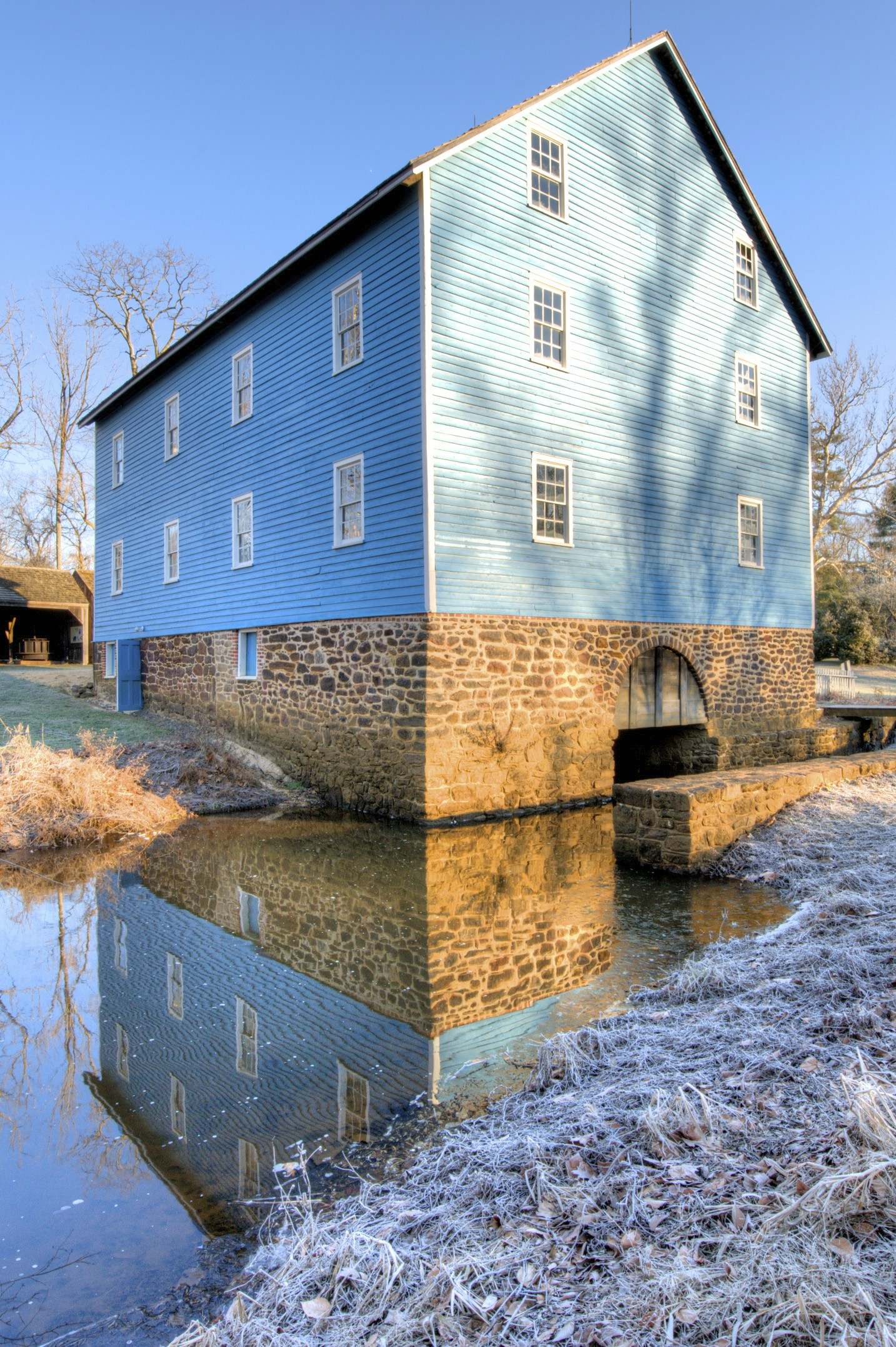
The Mill at Historic Walnford

Upper Freehold Township dates back to 1731, when it was formed from portions of Freehold Township. It was formally incorporated as a township by the Township Act of 1798 of the New Jersey Legislature on February 21, 1798. Over the years, portions of the township have been taken to form Millstone Township (February 28, 1844), Jackson Township (March 6, 1844) and Allentown (January 20, 1889). The name of the township derives from Freehold Township, which in turn is derived from the word freehold, an English legal term describing fee simple property ownership.

== Geography ==
According to the United States Census Bureau, the township had a total area of 47.37 square miles (122.68 km^{2}), including 46.48 square miles (120.37 km^{2}) of land and 0.89 square miles (2.31 km^{2}) of water (1.88%).

Unincorporated communities within the township include Arneytown, Cooleys Corner, Coxs Corner, Cream Ridge, Davis, Ellisdale, Emleys Hill, Fillmore, Hayti, Homes Mills, Hornerstown, Imlaystown, Kirbys Mills, Nelsonville, New Canton, New Sharon, Polhemustown, Prospertown, Pullentown, Red Valley, Robinsville, Sharon, Shrewsbury, Spring Mill, Walnford and Wrightsville.

The township borders Allentown, Millstone Township and Roosevelt in Monmouth County; North Hanover Township in Burlington County; East Windsor Township, Hamilton Township and Robbinsville Township in Mercer County; and Jackson Township and Plumsted Township in Ocean County.

Farming and other agricultural uses have been primary uses of land in the area since the time that the township was first formed. The township has 6,000 acres (2,400 ha) of land protected from development as part of a Farmland Preservation Program. Voters were the first in the county to approve a dedicated portion of property taxes to fund farmland preservation, which was increased by a 2001 referendum to four cents per $100 of assessed value, split between farmland preservation and the costs associated with purchasing and developing land for recreational uses.

The Assunpink Wildlife Preservation Area, of which more than 2,500 acres (1,000 ha) of the preserve's 6,300 acres (2,500 ha) are located in the township, as well as in portions of Millstone Township, Roosevelt and Robbinsville Township, offers wetlands and lakes for viewing migratory birds, in addition to mountain biking trails, bridle paths and hiking trails, operated under the supervision of the New Jersey Department of Environmental Protection Division of Fish and Wildlife.

== Demographics ==
Historical population
| Census | Pop. | Note | %± |
|---|---|---|---|
| 1790 | 3,442 | | — |
| 1810 | 3,843 | | — |
| 1820 | 4,541 | | 18.2% |
| 1830 | 4,826 | | 6.3% |
| 1840 | 5,026 | | 4.1% |
| 1850 | 2,566 | * | −48.9% |
| 1860 | 3,198 | | 24.6% |
| 1870 | 3,640 | | 13.8% |
| 1880 | 3,236 | | −11.1% |
| 1890 | 2,861 | * | −11.6% |
| 1900 | 2,112 | | −26.2% |
| 1910 | 2,053 | | −2.8% |
| 1920 | 1,737 | | −15.4% |
| 1930 | 1,867 | | 7.5% |
| 1940 | 1,839 | | −1.5% |
| 1950 | 2,193 | | 19.2% |
| 1960 | 2,363 | | 7.8% |
| 1970 | 2,551 | | 8.0% |
| 1980 | 2,750 | | 7.8% |
| 1990 | 3,277 | | 19.2% |
| 2000 | 4,282 | | 30.7% |
| 2010 | 6,902 | | 61.2% |
| 2020 | 7,273 | | 5.4% |
| 2023 (est.) | 7,203 | | −1.0% |
Population sources: 1790–1920 1840 1850–1870; 1850 1870 1880–1890; 1900–1910 1910–1930; 1940–2000 2000; 2010 2020 * = Lost territory in previous decade.

=== 2010 census ===
The 2010 United States census counted 6,902 people, 2,363 households, and 1,978 families in the township. The population density was 148.7 per square mile (57.4/km^{2}). There were 2,458 housing units at an average density of 53.0 per square mile (20.5/km^{2}). The racial makeup was 91.50% (6,315) White, 2.01% (139) Black or African American, 0.14% (10) Native American, 4.35% (300) Asian, 0.01% (1) Pacific Islander, 0.67% (46) from other races, and 1.32% (91) from two or more races. Hispanic or Latino of any race were 3.68% (254) of the population.

Of the 2,363 households, 38.1% had children under the age of 18; 76.5% were married couples living together; 4.9% had a female householder with no husband present and 16.3% were non-families. Of all households, 12.6% were made up of individuals and 6.1% had someone living alone who was 65 years of age or older. The average household size was 2.92 and the average family size was 3.19.

26.6% of the population were under the age of 18, 5.2% from 18 to 24, 20.4% from 25 to 44, 33.7% from 45 to 64, and 14.0% who were 65 years of age or older. The median age was 43.7 years. For every 100 females, the population had 98.6 males. For every 100 females ages 18 and older there were 97.3 males.

The Census Bureau's 2006–2010 American Community Survey showed that (in 2010 inflation-adjusted dollars) median household income was $122,525 (with a margin of error of +/− $16,693) and the median family income was $126,849 (+/− $10,754). Males had a median income of $100,583 (+/− $18,963) versus $65,183 (+/− $5,414) for females. The per capita income for the borough was $48,665 (+/− $3,717). About 2.3% of families and 2.5% of the population were below the poverty line, including 3.8% of those under age 18 and 2.9% of those age 65 or over.

=== 2000 census ===
As of the 2000 United States census there were 4,282 people, 1,437 households, and 1,198 families residing in the township. The population density was 91.4 inhabitants per square mile (35.3/km^{2}). There were 1,501 housing units at an average density of 32.0 per square mile (12.4/km^{2}). The racial makeup of the township was 94.70% White, 1.05% African American, 0.14% Native American, 1.40% Asian, 0.84% from other races, and 1.87% from two or more races. Hispanic or Latino of any race were 3.53% of the population.

There were 1,437 households, out of which 42.7% had children under the age of 18 living with them, 74.7% were married couples living together, 5.5% had a female householder with no husband present, and 16.6% were non-families. 11.7% of all households were made up of individuals, and 5.2% had someone living alone who was 65 years of age or older. The average household size was 2.96 and the average family size was 3.24.

In the township the population was spread out, with 27.8% under the age of 18, 5.0% from 18 to 24, 32.1% from 25 to 44, 25.6% from 45 to 64, and 9.4% who were 65 years of age or older. The median age was 38 years. For every 100 females, there were 101.7 males. For every 100 females age 18 and over, there were 98.7 males.

The median income for a household in the township was $71,250, and the median income for a family was $78,334. Males had a median income of $55,987 versus $35,221 for females. The per capita income for the township was $29,387. About 4.3% of families and 4.0% of the population were below the poverty line, including 1.3% of those under age 18 and 11.6% of those age 65 or over.

== Parks and recreation ==
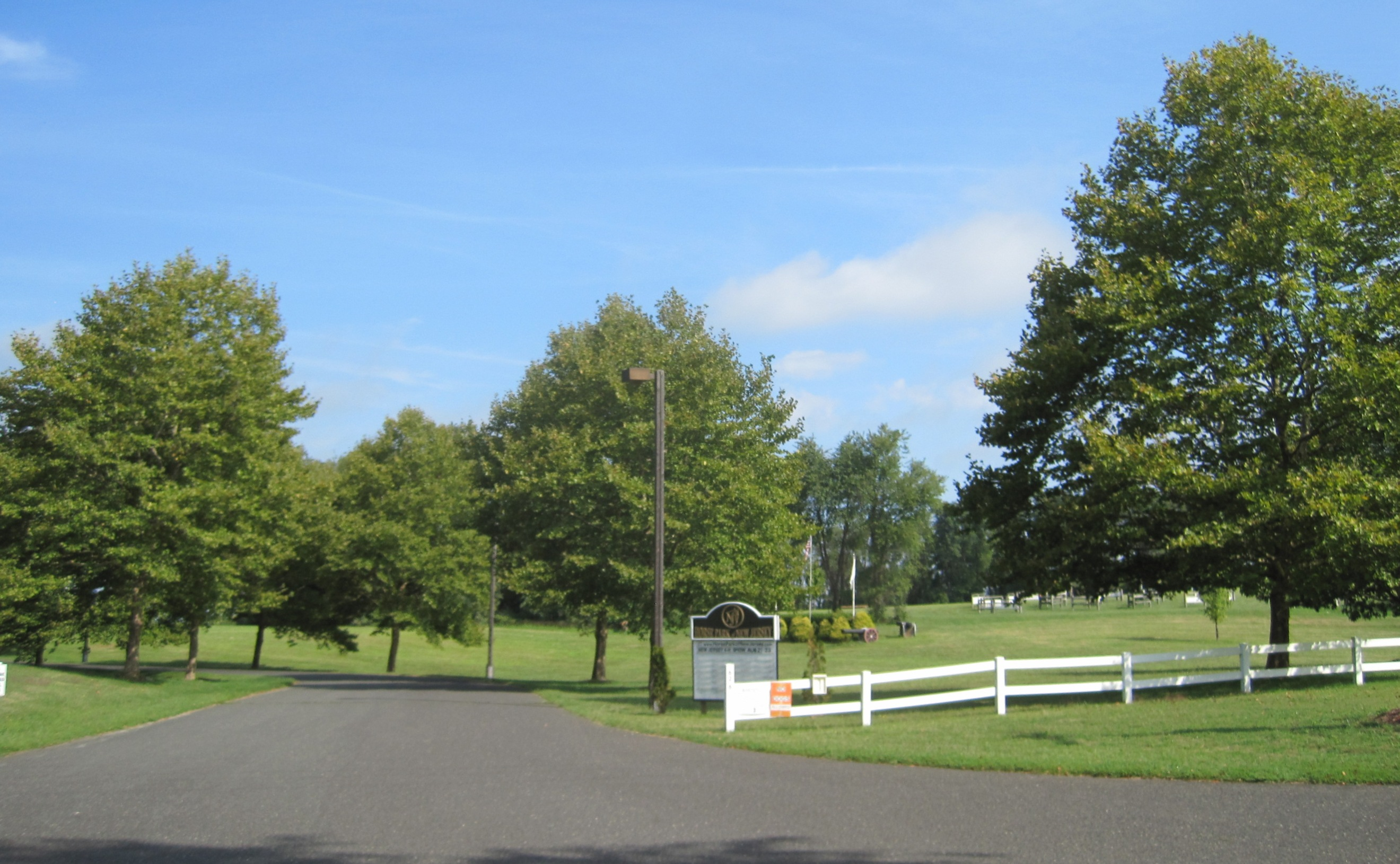
Entrance to the Horse Park of New Jersey

The Horse Park of New Jersey was conceived by equestrian enthusiasts concerned about the dwindling amount of land dedicated to their interests and activities. The Horse Park opened in 1987 on land initially purchased by the New Jersey Department of Environmental Protection with Green Acres funds, based on the input of the state's Equine Advisory Board, and is centrally located in Monmouth County's equine-oriented countryside.

Monmouth County parks in the township include Clayton Park, a passive recreation area with woodlands and hiking trails covering a total of 438 acres (177 ha) of land that dates back to a purchase of land in 1978 from an area farmer who sold the land to the county below market value to ensure that the land would be preserved.

Historic Walnford includes a restored Georgian style house, working mill, carriage house and cow barn that were all part of an industrial community dating back almost 200 years that was developed by the Waln family on a site that covers 38 acres (15 ha). The Crosswicks Creek Greenbelt includes 328 acres (133 ha) of land in the township, as part of a corridor running along the Crosswicks Creek from Fort Dix in Burlington County towards the Delaware River along the border between Burlington and Mercer County, traveling through Upper Freehold Township and including Historic Walnford.

A bond ordinance passed in 2000 provides for the development of soccer fields, baseball fields and basketball courts at the Byron Johnson Recreation Area and other township parks. The Byron Johnson site adjoins Allentown High School near the Allentown border, and is owned by Monmouth County and administered by the township, developed using municipal funds and monies contributed by developers.

== Government ==
=== Local government ===
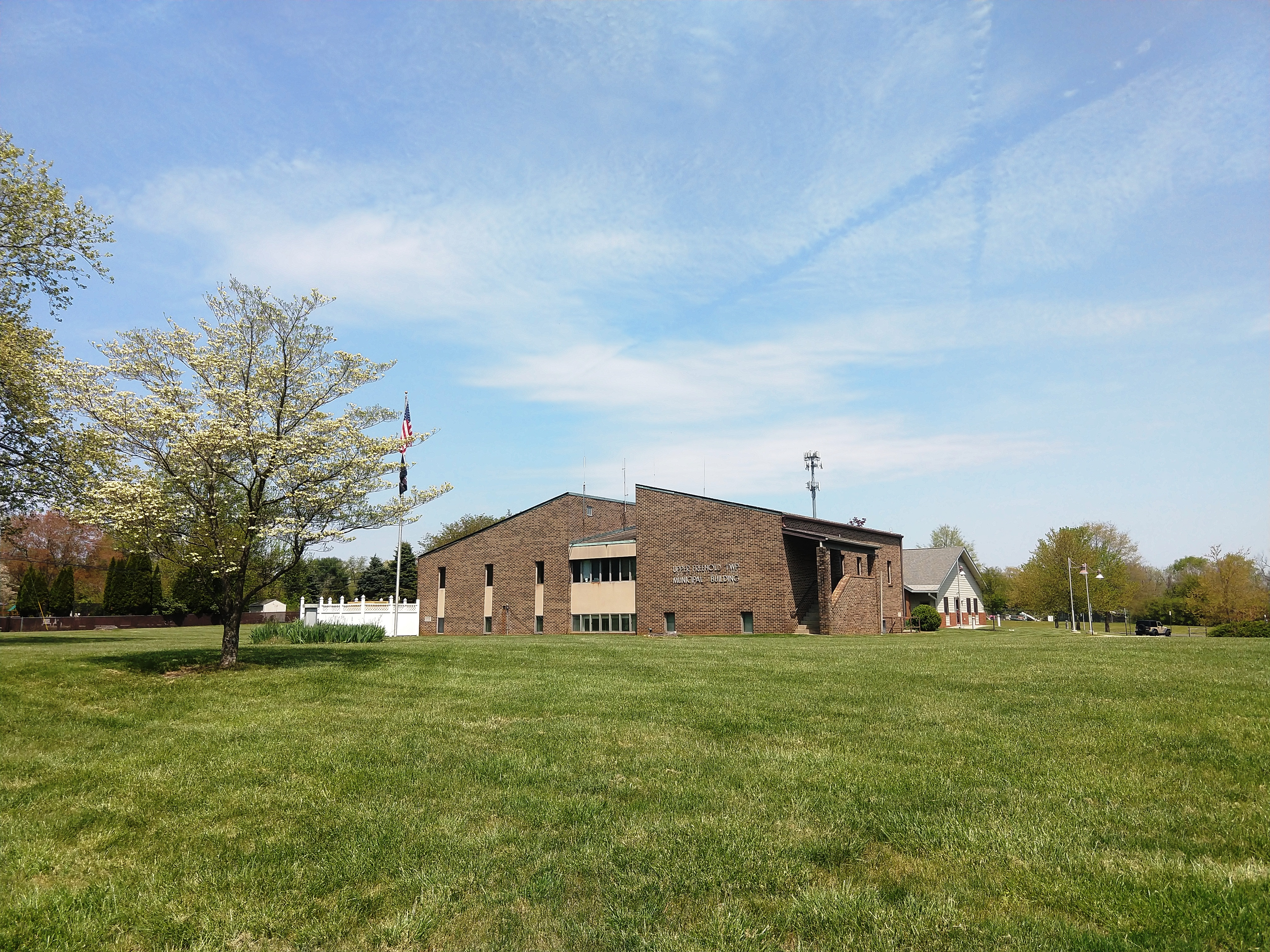
Upper Freehold Township Municipal Building

Upper Freehold Township is governed under the Township form of New Jersey municipal government, one of 141 municipalities (of the 564) statewide that use this form, the second-most commonly used form of government in the state. The Township Committee is comprised of five members, who are elected directly by the voters at-large in partisan elections to serve three-year terms of office on a staggered basis, with either one or two seats coming up for election each year as part of the November general election in a three-year cycle. At an annual reorganization meeting, the Township Committee selects one of its members to serve as Mayor and another as Deputy Mayor.

As of 2025, members of the Upper Freehold Township Committee are Mayor Robert A. Frascella (R, term on committee ends December 31, 2026; term as mayor ends 2025), Deputy Mayor Stanley Moslowski Jr. (R, term on committee and as deputy mayor ends 2025), Stephen J. Alexander (R, 2027), Anthony Garaguso (R, 2027) and LoriSue H. Mount (R, 2025).

=== Federal, state, and county representation ===
Upper Freehold Township is located in the 3rd Congressional District and is part of New Jersey's 12th state legislative district.

For the 119th United States Congress, New Jersey's 3rd congressional district is currently represented Herb Conaway (D, Delran Township). New Jersey is represented in the United States Senate by Democrats Cory Booker (Newark, term ends 2027) and Andy Kim (Moorestown, term ends 2031).

For the 2026–2027 session, the 12th legislative district of the New Jersey Legislature is represented in the State Senate by Owen Henry (R, Old Bridge Township) and in the General Assembly by Robert D. Clifton (R, Matawan) and Alex Sauickie (R, Jackson Township).

Monmouth County is governed by a Board of County Commissioners composed of five members who are elected at-large to serve three-year terms of office on a staggered basis, with either one or two seats up for election each year as part of the November general election. At an annual reorganization meeting held in the beginning of January, the board selects one of its members to serve as director and another as deputy director.

As of 2025, Monmouth County's Commissioners are Director Thomas A. Arnone (R, Neptune City, 2025), Susan M. Kiley (R, Hazlet Township, 2027), Erik Anderson (R, Shrewsbury, 2026), Nick DiRocco (R, Wall Township, 2025), and Deputy Director Ross F. Licitra (R, Marlboro Township, 2026).

Constitutional officers elected on a countywide basis are Clerk Christine Giordano Hanlon (R, 2025; Ocean Township), Sheriff Shaun Golden (R, 2025; Howell Township) and Surrogate Rosemarie D. Peters (R, 2026; Middletown Township).

=== Politics ===
United States presidential election results for Upper Freehold Township
| Year | Republican | | Democratic | | Third party(ies) | |
| Year | No. | % | No. | % | No. | % |
|---|---|---|---|---|---|---|
| 2024 | 2,799 | 60.66% | 1,722 | 37.32% | 93 | 2.02% |
| 2020 | 2,761 | 58.67% | 1,881 | 39.97% | 64 | 1.36% |
| 2016 | 2,352 | 60.37% | 1,408 | 36.14% | 136 | 3.49% |
| 2012 | 2,287 | 61.89% | 1,372 | 37.13% | 36 | 0.97% |
| 2008 | 2,337 | 60.89% | 1,461 | 38.07% | 40 | 1.04% |
| 2004 | 2,153 | 63.40% | 1,212 | 35.69% | 31 | 0.91% |
| 2000 | 1,247 | 60.92% | 694 | 33.90% | 106 | 5.18% |
| 1996 | 835 | 53.98% | 481 | 31.09% | 231 | 14.93% |
| 1992 | 806 | 48.52% | 390 | 23.48% | 465 | 28.00% |

As of March 2011, there were a total of 4,686 registered voters in Upper Freehold Township, of which 722 (15.4%) were registered as Democrats, 2,218 (47.3%) were registered as Republicans and 1,741 (37.2%) were registered as Unaffiliated. There were 5 voters registered as Libertarians or Greens.

Gubernatorial election results for Upper Freehold
| Year | Republican | | Democratic | | Third party(ies) | |
| Year | No. | % | No. | % | No. | % |
|---|---|---|---|---|---|---|
| 2025 | 2,261 | 60.37% | 1,463 | 39.07% | 21 | 0.56% |
| 2021 | 2,160 | 66.34% | 1,069 | 32.83% | 27 | 0.83% |
| 2017 | 1,667 | 65.27% | 846 | 33.12% | 41 | 1.61% |
| 2013 | 1,827 | 75.37% | 558 | 23.02% | 39 | 1.61% |
| 2009 | 1,972 | 69.90% | 676 | 23.96% | 173 | 6.13% |
| 2005 | 1,645 | 65.77% | 738 | 29.51% | 118 | 4.72% |

In the 2012 presidential election, Republican Mitt Romney received 61.9% of the vote (2,287 cast), ahead of Democrat Barack Obama with 37.1% (1,372 votes), and other candidates with 1.0% (36 votes), among the 3,723 ballots cast by the township's 4,818 registered voters (28 ballots were spoiled), for a turnout of 77.3%. In the 2008 presidential election, Republican John McCain received 60.3% of the vote (2,337 cast), ahead of Democrat Barack Obama with 37.7% (1,461 votes) and other candidates with 1.0% (40 votes), among the 3,878 ballots cast by the township's 4,893 registered voters, for a turnout of 79.3%. In the 2004 presidential election, Republican George W. Bush received 63.2% of the vote (2,153 ballots cast), outpolling Democrat John Kerry with 35.6% (1,212 votes) and other candidates with 0.7% (31 votes), among the 3,409 ballots cast by the township's 4,203 registered voters, for a turnout percentage of 81.1.

In the 2013 gubernatorial election, Republican Chris Christie received 75.4% of the vote (1,827 cast), ahead of Democrat Barbara Buono with 23.0% (558 votes), and other candidates with 1.6% (39 votes), among the 2,442 ballots cast by the township's 4,893 registered voters (18 ballots were spoiled), for a turnout of 49.9%. In the 2009 gubernatorial election, Republican Chris Christie received 69.5% of the vote (1,972 ballots cast), ahead of Democrat Jon Corzine with 23.8% (676 votes), Independent Chris Daggett with 5.4% (153 votes) and other candidates with 0.7% (20 votes), among the 2,836 ballots cast by the township's 4,737 registered voters, yielding a 59.9% turnout.

United States Senate election results for Upper Freehold1
| Year | Republican | | Democratic | | Third party(ies) | |
| Year | No. | % | No. | % | No. | % |
|---|---|---|---|---|---|---|
| 2024 | 2,680 | 59.38% | 1,751 | 38.80% | 82 | 1.82% |
| 2018 | 2,209 | 64.82% | 1,091 | 32.01% | 108 | 3.17% |
| 2012 | 2,222 | 63.67% | 1,210 | 34.67% | 58 | 1.66% |
| 2006 | 1,552 | 64.27% | 789 | 32.67% | 74 | 3.06% |

United States Senate election results for Upper Freehold2
| Year | Republican | | Democratic | | Third party(ies) | |
| Year | No. | % | No. | % | No. | % |
|---|---|---|---|---|---|---|
| 2020 | 2,815 | 60.52% | 1,754 | 37.71% | 82 | 1.76% |
| 2014 | 1,306 | 66.26% | 633 | 32.12% | 32 | 1.62% |
| 2013 | 1,047 | 65.64% | 524 | 32.85% | 24 | 1.50% |
| 2008 | 2,352 | 65.63% | 1,152 | 32.14% | 80 | 2.23% |

== Education ==
Students in public school for pre-kindergarten through twelfth grade attend the Upper Freehold Regional School District, which serves students from Allentown Borough and Upper Freehold Township. Millstone Township sends students to the district's high school as part of a sending/receiving relationship with the Millstone Township Schools. As of the 2021–22 school year, the district, comprised of three schools, had an enrollment of 2,124 students and 176.2 classroom teachers (on an FTE basis), for a student–teacher ratio of 12.1:1. Schools in the district (with 2021–22 enrollment data from the National Center for Education Statistics) are Newell Elementary School with 516 students in grades PreK-4, Stone Bridge Middle School with 460 students in grades 5-8 and Allentown High School with 1,131 students in grades 9-12. The operations of the district are overseen by a nine-member board of education, with the board's trustees elected directly by voters to serve three-year terms of office on a staggered basis, with three seats up for election each year. The nine seats are allocated to the two constituent municipalities based on population, with five assigned to Upper Freehold Township and four to Allentown.

== Transportation ==
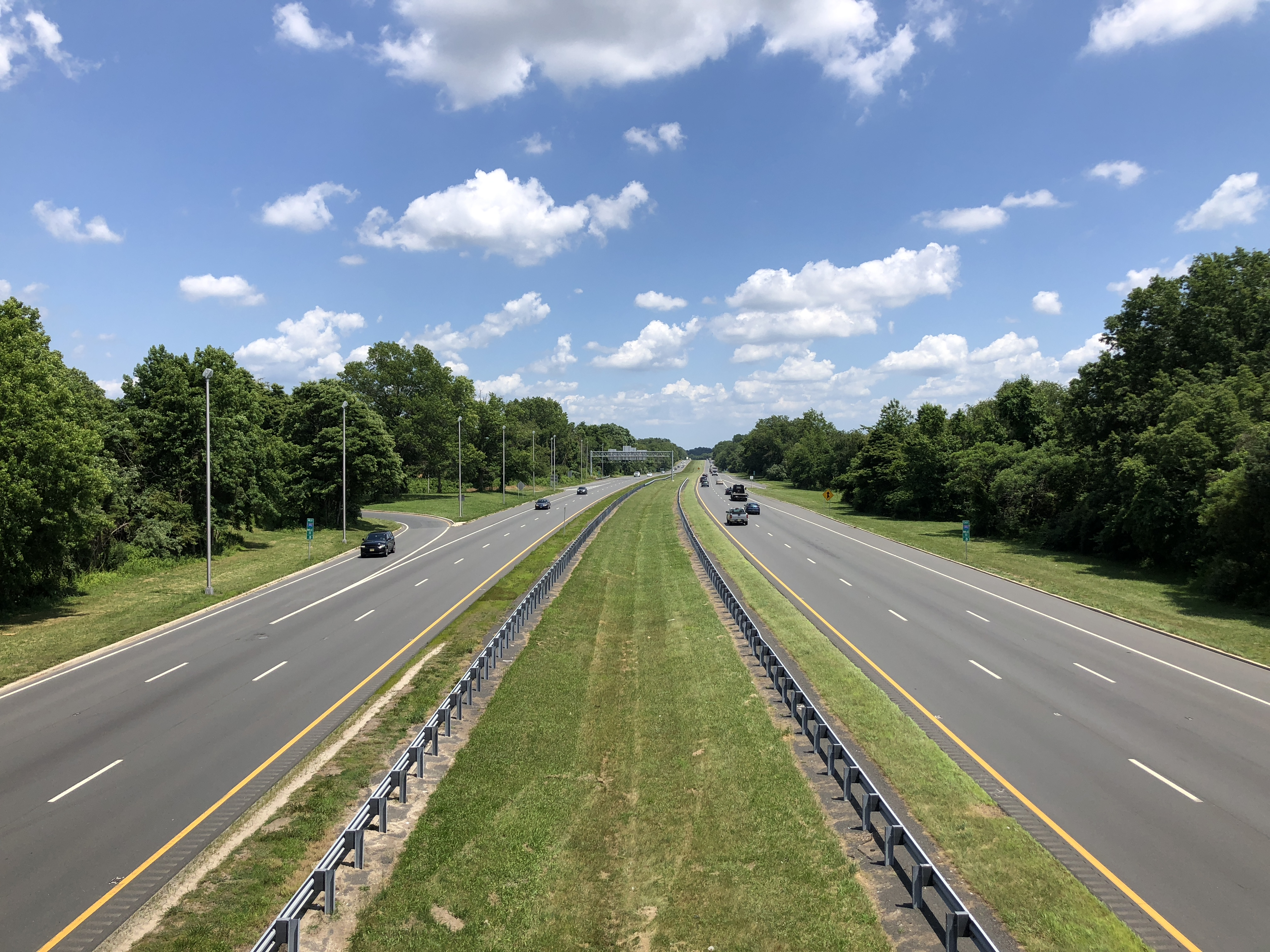
Interstate 195 in Upper Freehold Township

As of May 2010, the township had a total of 116.01 miles (186.70 km) of roadways, of which 82.01 miles (131.98 km) were maintained by the municipality, 28.28 miles (45.51 km) by Monmouth County and 5.72 miles (9.21 km) by the New Jersey Department of Transportation.

A 5.7-mile (9.2 km) portion of the Central Jersey Expressway (Interstate 195) goes through Upper Freehold, making it an important artery for residents of the township. Exit 11 leads to the Horse Park of New Jersey. Exit 8 leads to County Route 539 (Hornerstown Road / Trenton-Forked River Road / Davis-Allentown Road) to Hightstown, or towards the Garden State Parkway south to Atlantic City. County Route 524 (called Yardville-Allentown Road / South Main Street where it enters Allentown / Stage Coach Road) heads across the township, mostly to the north of Interstate 195, from Hamilton Township in Mercer County to the east and Millstone Township to the west. County Route 526 (Walker Avenue) heads from Allentown in the east to Millstone Township in the west, paralleling Interstate 195 to the north. County Route 537 (Monmouth Road) runs for 6.5 miles (10.5 km) along the township's southern borders with the Ocean County municipalities of Plumsted Township and Jackson Township.

Interstate 95 (the New Jersey Turnpike) is minutes away along I-195 in neighboring Robbinsville Township (Exit 7A) and not too far also in bordering East Windsor (Exit 8).

== Points of interest ==
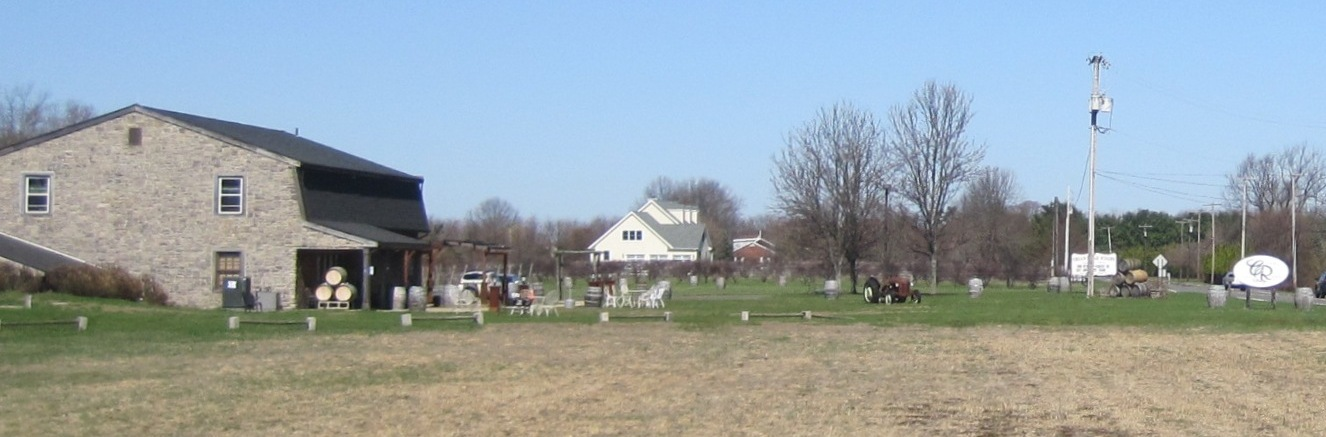
Cream Ridge Winery

- Cream Ridge Winery
- Monmouth County Park System – Clayton Park, Crosswicks Creek Park, Historic Walnford
- Imlaystown

== Notable people ==
People who were born in, residents of, or otherwise closely associated with Upper Freehold Township include:

- James Cox (1753–1810), member of the United States House of Representatives (from New Jersey)
- John H. Froude (born 1930), politician who served in the New Jersey General Assembly from 1972 to 1980
- Joseph Holmes (1736–1809), member of the New Jersey Legislative Council who served on the Upper Freehold Township Committee and on the county Board of Chosen Freeholders
- Gilbert Imlay (1754–1828), businessman, author and diplomat
- Elisha Lawrence (1746–1799), politician who served as Vice-President of Council from 1789 through 1792, and again in 1795
- Linda K. Meirs (1884–1972), American Red Cross and Army nurse during World War I who was one of the first six American recipients of the Florence Nightingale Medal
- Ross Scheuerman (born 1993), running back for the Hamilton Tiger-Cats of the Canadian Football League
- Chris Tomson (born 1984), drummer with the band Vampire Weekend
- Samuel G. Wright (1781–1845), politician who was elected to represent New Jersey's 2nd congressional district in 1845 but died before he could take office
