= Millstone Township Schools =

School district in Monmouth County, New Jersey, US

Address
- 5 Dawson Court Millstone Township, Monmouth County, New Jersey, 08535; United States
- Coordinates: 40.205043°N 74.424641°W

District information
- Grades: PreK-8
- Superintendent: Christopher Huss
- Business administrator: Bernard Biesiada
- Schools: 3

Students and staff
- Enrollment: 1,109 (as of 2018–19)
- Faculty: 93.0 FTEs
- Student–teacher ratio: 11.9:1

Other information
- District Factor Group: I
- Website: District website
Ind.	Per pupil	District spending	Rank (*)	K-8 average	%± vs. average
1A	Total Spending	$19,246	72	$18,891	1.9%
1	Budgetary Cost	14,658	53	14,159	3.5%
2	Classroom Instruction	8,785	50	8,659	1.5%
6	Support Services	2,101	46	2,167	−3.0%
8	Administrative Cost	1,822	74	1,547	17.8%
10	Operations & Maintenance	1,840	68	1,612	14.1%
13	Extracurricular Activities	111	58	104	6.7%
16	Median Teacher Salary	59,910	32	61,136
Data from NJDoE 2014 Taxpayers' Guide to Education Spending. *Of K-8 districts with more than 750 students. Lowest spending=1; Highest=84

The Millstone Township Schools are a community public school district that serves students in pre-kindergarten through eighth grade from Millstone Township, in Monmouth County, in the U.S. state of New Jersey.

As of the 2018–19 school year, the district, comprising three schools, had an enrollment of 1,109 students and 93.0 classroom teachers (on an FTE basis), for a student–teacher ratio of 11.9:1.

The district is classified by the New Jersey Department of Education as being in District Factor Group "I", the second-highest of eight groupings. District Factor Groups organize districts statewide to allow comparison by common socioeconomic characteristics of the local districts. From lowest socioeconomic status to highest, the categories are A, B, CD, DE, FG, GH, I and J.

Students in ninth through twelfth grades for public school attend Allentown High School in Allentown, as part of a sending/receiving relationship with the Upper Freehold Regional School District, which also includes students from Allentown and Upper Freehold Township. As of the 2018–19 school year, the high school had an enrollment of 1,206 students and 89.5 classroom teachers (on an FTE basis), for a student–teacher ratio of 13.5:1.

== Schools ==
Schools in the district (with 2018–19 enrollment data from the National Center for Education Statistics) are:

- Millstone Township Primary School with 386 students in grades PreK-2
  - Paul Baker, principal
- Millstone Township Elementary School with 321 students in grades 3-5
  - Suzanne Guidry, principal
- Millstone Township Middle School with 400 students in grades 6-8
  - Trish Bogusz, principal

== Administration ==
Core members of the district's administration are:

- Chris Huss, superintendent of schools
- Bernard Biesiada, business administrator and board secretary

== Board of education ==
The district's board of education, composed of nine members, sets policy and oversees the fiscal and educational operation of the district through its administration. As a Type II school district, the board's trustees are elected directly by voters to serve three-year terms of office on a staggered basis, with three seats up for election each year held (since 2012) as part of the November general election. The board appoints a superintendent to oversee the district's day-to-day operations and a business administrator to supervise the business functions of the district.
