= Ross Scheuerman =

American gridiron football player (born 1993)

Profile
- Position: Running back

Personal information
- Born: March 5, 1993 (age 33); Cream Ridge, New Jersey, U.S.
- Listed height: 6 ft 0 in (1.83 m)
- Listed weight: 211 lb (96 kg)

Career information
- High school: Allentown (NJ)
- College: Lafayette

Career history
- 2015: Pittsburgh Steelers*
- 2015: Green Bay Packers*
- 2016: Philadelphia Eagles*
- 2016–2017: Hamilton Tiger-Cats
- * Offseason or practice squad member only
- Stats at CFL.ca

Ross Scheuerman (born March 5, 1993) is a former professional Canadian football running back. He played college football at Lafayette. Scheuerman was signed by the Pittsburgh Steelers as an undrafted free agent in 2015. He has also been a member of the Green Bay Packers and Philadelphia Eagles. He last played for the Hamilton Tiger-Cats of the Canadian Football League (CFL).

Scheuerman grew up in the Cream Ridge section of Upper Freehold Township, New Jersey and attended Allentown High School, where he set the conference career records for carries, rushing yards and touchdowns.

== Professional career ==
External videos
- Scheuerman's NFL Combine workout

Pre-draft measurables
Height	Weight	Arm length	Hand span	40-yard dash	10-yard split	20-yard split	20-yard shuttle	Three-cone drill	Vertical jump	Broad jump	Bench press
6 ft 0 in (1.83 m)	204 lb (93 kg)	30 in (0.76 m)	8 3/4 in (0.22 m)	4.62 s	1.65 s	2.73 s	4.11 s	7.08 s	33 in (0.84 m)	10 ft 1 in (3.07 m)	15 reps
All values are from NFL Combine

=== Pittsburgh Steelers ===
After going undrafted in the 2015 NFL draft, Scheuerman signed with the Pittsburgh Steelers on May 2, 2015. On August 2, 2015, he was waived by the Steelers.

=== Green Bay Packers ===
On December 8, 2015, Scheuerman was signed to the Green Bay Packers' practice squad. He was not re-signed after the season.

=== Philadelphia Eagles ===
Scheuerman was signed by the Philadelphia Eagles on January 21, 2016. On May 3, 2016, he was released by the Eagles.

=== Hamilton Tiger-Cats ===
On May 28, 2016, Scheuerman was signed by the Hamilton Tiger-Cats. He made his first start on September 16, 2016, after starting running back C. J. Gable went down with an injury. Scheuerman rushed for 79 yards on 19 carries; he also added 5 receptions for 40 yards.
