= Cooleys Corner, New Jersey =

Populated place in Monmouth County, New Jersey, US

- Unincorporated community
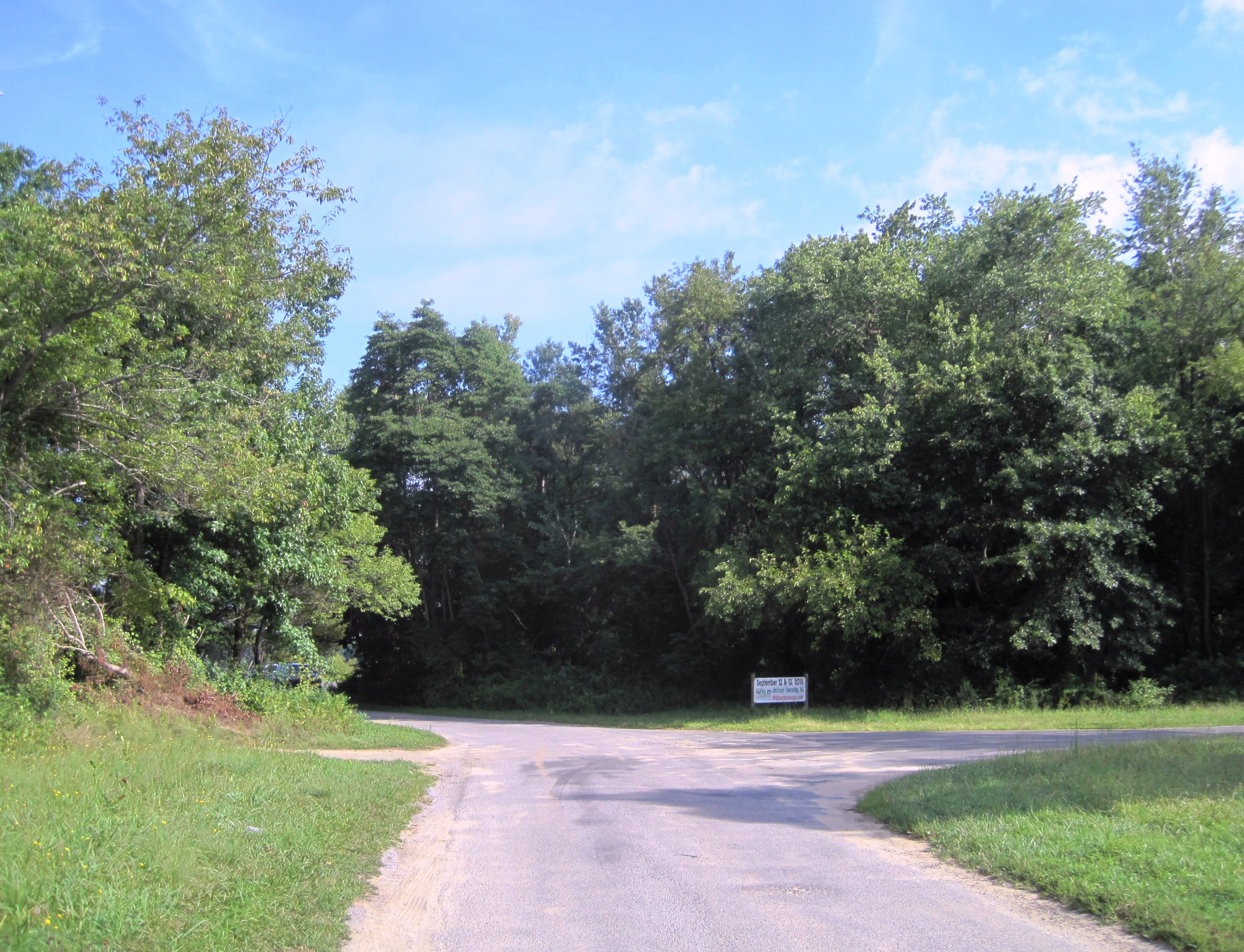
- Site of the former intersection of Clarksburg and Imlaystown-Hightstown roads

- Location in Monmouth County; Inset: Location of county in New Jersey Cooleys Corner (New Jersey) Cooleys Corner (the United States)
- Coordinates: 40°12′53″N 74°30′59″W
- Country: United States
- State: New Jersey
- County: Monmouth
- Township: Upper Freehold
- Elevation: 118 ft (36 m)
- GNIS feature ID: 875624

Cooleys Corner is an unincorporated community located within Upper Freehold Township in Monmouth County, in the U.S. state of New Jersey. The site of the settlement is within the Assunpink Wildlife Management Area, a New Jersey Department of Environmental Protection Division of Fish and Wildlife-operated preserved area in Monmouth and Mercer counties along the Assunpink Creek. Before the creation of the Assunpink Lake in the 1970s, the area consisted of farmland located at the intersection of Clarksburg Road and Imlaystown-Hightstown Road. Some farmland is still present in the area but is now mostly used by hunters. The main boat ramp to Assunpink Lake is located along the former Imlaystown-Hightstown Road.
