= Emleys Hill, New Jersey =

Populated place in Monmouth County, New Jersey, US

- Unincorporated community
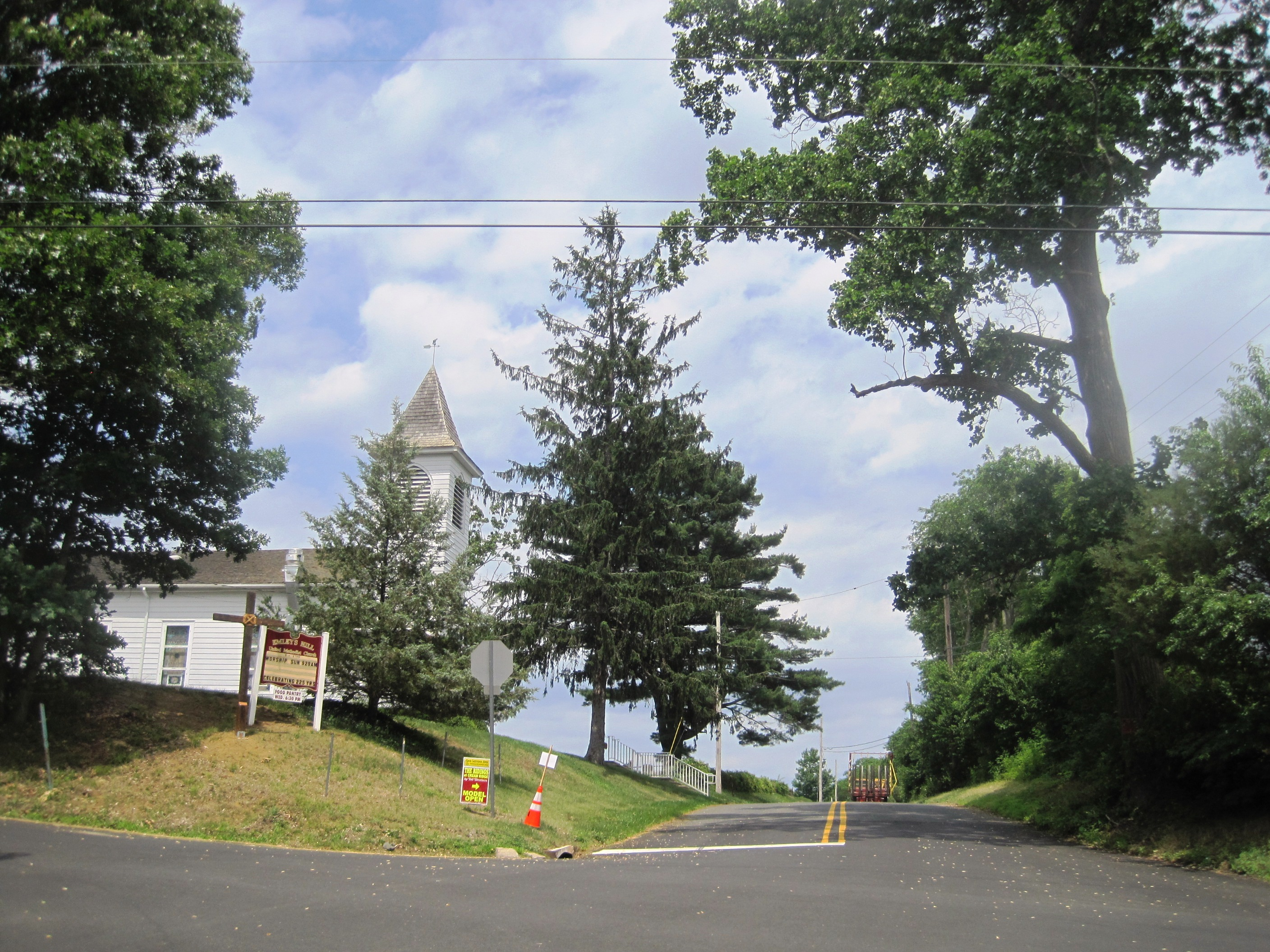
- Emley's Hill United Methodist Church

- Location of Emleys Hill in Monmouth County. Inset: Location of Monmouth County within the state of New Jersey. Emleys Hill (New Jersey) Emleys Hill (the United States)
- Coordinates: 40°08′35″N 74°28′59″W
- Country: United States
- State: New Jersey
- County: Monmouth
- Township: Upper Freehold
- Elevation: 187 ft (57 m)
- Time zone: UTC−05:00 (Eastern (EST))
  - Summer (DST): UTC−04:00 (EDT)
- GNIS feature ID: 2045431

Emleys Hill (also Emley's Hill) is an unincorporated community located within Upper Freehold Township in Monmouth County, in the U.S. state of New Jersey. The settlement is located at the intersection of Emleys Hill Road and Burlington Path Road.

Emley's Hill United Methodist Church, founded in 1790, is located there. Except for the church and adjacent cemetery, the area consists of farmland over rolling hills.
