= Allenton =

Allenton may refer to:

== Places ==
- Allenton, Derbyshire, England
- Allenton, New Zealand, a suburb in the town of Ashburton, New Zealand
- Allenton, Northumberland, England is now called Alwinton
- Allenton, Michigan, USA
- Allenton, Wisconsin, USA

== See also ==
- Allanton (disambiguation)
- Allentown (disambiguation)
