= Linda K. Meirs =

American Red Cross and Army nurse

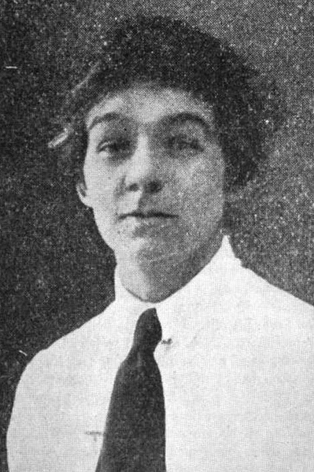
- Linda K. Meirs, from a 1921 publication.
- Born: Melinda Konover Meirs; June 5, 1884; Cream Ridge, New Jersey
- Died: November 27, 1972 (aged 88)
- Citizenship: American
- Education: Philadelphia General Hospital Training School for Nurses
- Occupation: nurse
- Known for: American Red Cross nursing in Europe during and after World War I

Melinda Konover Meirs (June 5, 1884 — November 27, 1972), known as Linda K. Meirs, was an American Red Cross and Army nurse during World War I. She was one of the first six American recipients of the Florence Nightingale Medal, awarded by the International Committee of the Red Cross in 1920.

== Early life ==
Linda K. Meirs was born in the Cream Ridge section of Upper Freehold Township, New Jersey, the daughter of Charles Robbins Meirs and Ida Konover Meirs. She grew up in Allentown, New Jersey. She attended the Philadelphia General Hospital Training School for Nurses.

== Career ==
Early in her career, Meirs worked in hospitals in Illinois, Colorado, Minnesota, and Mexico. During World War I, Meirs went to Kiev with the American Red Cross in 1914, but joined the United States Army Nurse Corps in 1916. She worked in field hospitals near the battlefront, as head of nurses at Jouy-sur-Morin, Château-Thierry, Toul, and Fleury-sur-Aire. In 1917, she was part of an American Red Cross mission to Romania. In 1918 she was relieved from active duty in the Army Nurse Corps, and assigned to be Chief Nurse at a Boston hospital by the U. S. Public Health Service. While waiting in Paris for transport home, she baked 176 apple pies for her patients to enjoy on Christmas Eve after the Armistice. A 1921 report commented on her war years, "She was the kind of person to inspire soldier patients with awe, admiration, and affection."

In 1920 she was one of the first six American nurses to receive the Florence Nightingale Medal from the International Committee of the Red Cross. She also received honors from the French (the Croix de Guerre), Romania (the Queen Marie Cross), Germany (the German Red Cross Medal), and Victory Medals from the United States and New Jersey. She retired from nursing in 1942, and lived with her sister Anna in New Jersey. During World War II, she baked cookies for local men in the service.

== Personal life ==
Meirs owned a cottage in Stone Harbor, New Jersey in the 1930s and 1940s. After 1963 she lived with her widowed brother, Charley, in Yardley, Pennsylvania. She died in 1972, aged 88 years.
