= Toadtown, California =

Unincorporated community in California, United States

Toadtown
- Unincorporated community
- Location in California Toadtown (the United States)
- Coordinates: 39°53′17″N 121°35′26″W
- Country: United States
- State: California
- County: Butte
- Elevation: 2,782 ft (848 m)

Toadtown (formerly, Allentown) is an unincorporated community in Butte County, California, United States. It lies at an elevation of 2782 feet (848 m).

A sawmill was established near Toadtown, on Little Butte Creek, in 1859. A major underground gold mine at the site began a few years later, and had a ball mill for crushing hard gold-bearing rock. The El Monte mine made a strike of high-grade ore in September, 1930, which yielded several hundred dollars and some good specimens. All traces of mining activity were gone by 1970.
