= Allen Township, Pennsylvania =

Allen Township, Pennsylvania may refer to one of the following places in the US state of Pennsylvania:

- Allen Township, Northampton County, Pennsylvania
- East Allen Township, Pennsylvania
- Lower Allen Township, Pennsylvania
- Upper Allen Township, Pennsylvania

== See also ==
- Allentown, Pennsylvania
