= New Canton, New Jersey =

Populated place in Monmouth County, New Jersey, US

- Unincorporated community
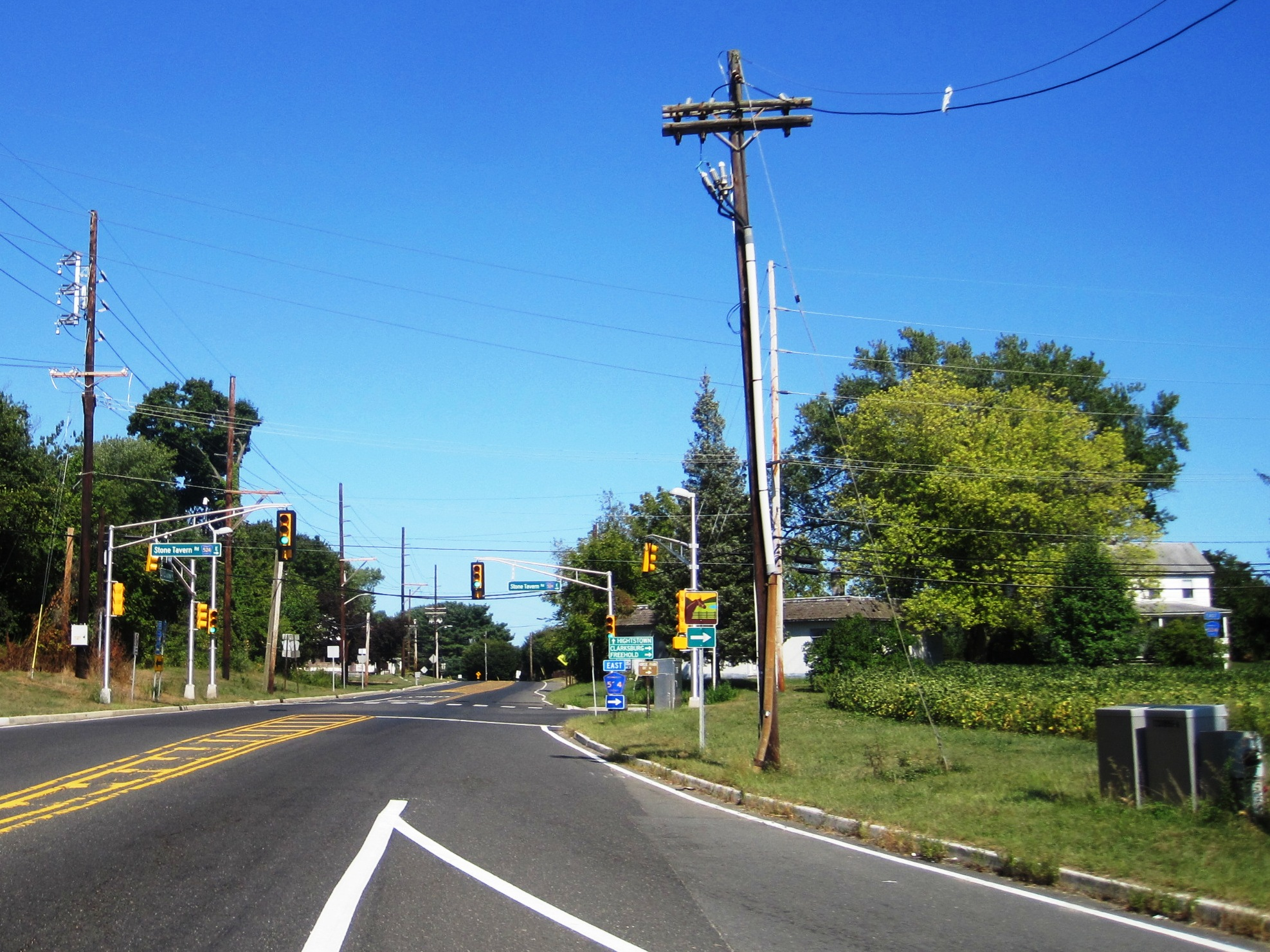
- Intersection of Old York Road (CR 539) and New Canton-Stone Tavern Road (CR 524)

- Location within Mercer County, New Jersey Location within Monmouth County, New Jersey Location within New Jersey
- Coordinates: 40°11′13″N 74°34′00″W
- Country: United States
- State: New Jersey
- County: Mercer and Monmouth
- Township: Robbinsville and Upper Freehold
- Elevation: 118 ft (36 m)
- GNIS feature ID: 878727

New Canton is an unincorporated community located along the border of Robbinsville Township in Mercer County and Upper Freehold Township in Monmouth County, in the U.S. state of New Jersey. The area was once known as Cabbagetown and has been settled since the 18th century. The settlement is located at the intersection of Old York Road (County Route 539) and New Canton-Stone Tavern Road (CR 524) just north of Interstate 195's interchange 8. The Upper Freehold side of the area contains farmland and new housing developments while the Robbinsville side features new commercial warehouse buildings including an Amazon.com Fulfillment Center opened in July 2014.
