= Cream Ridge, New Jersey =

Populated place in Monmouth County, New Jersey, US

- Census-designated place
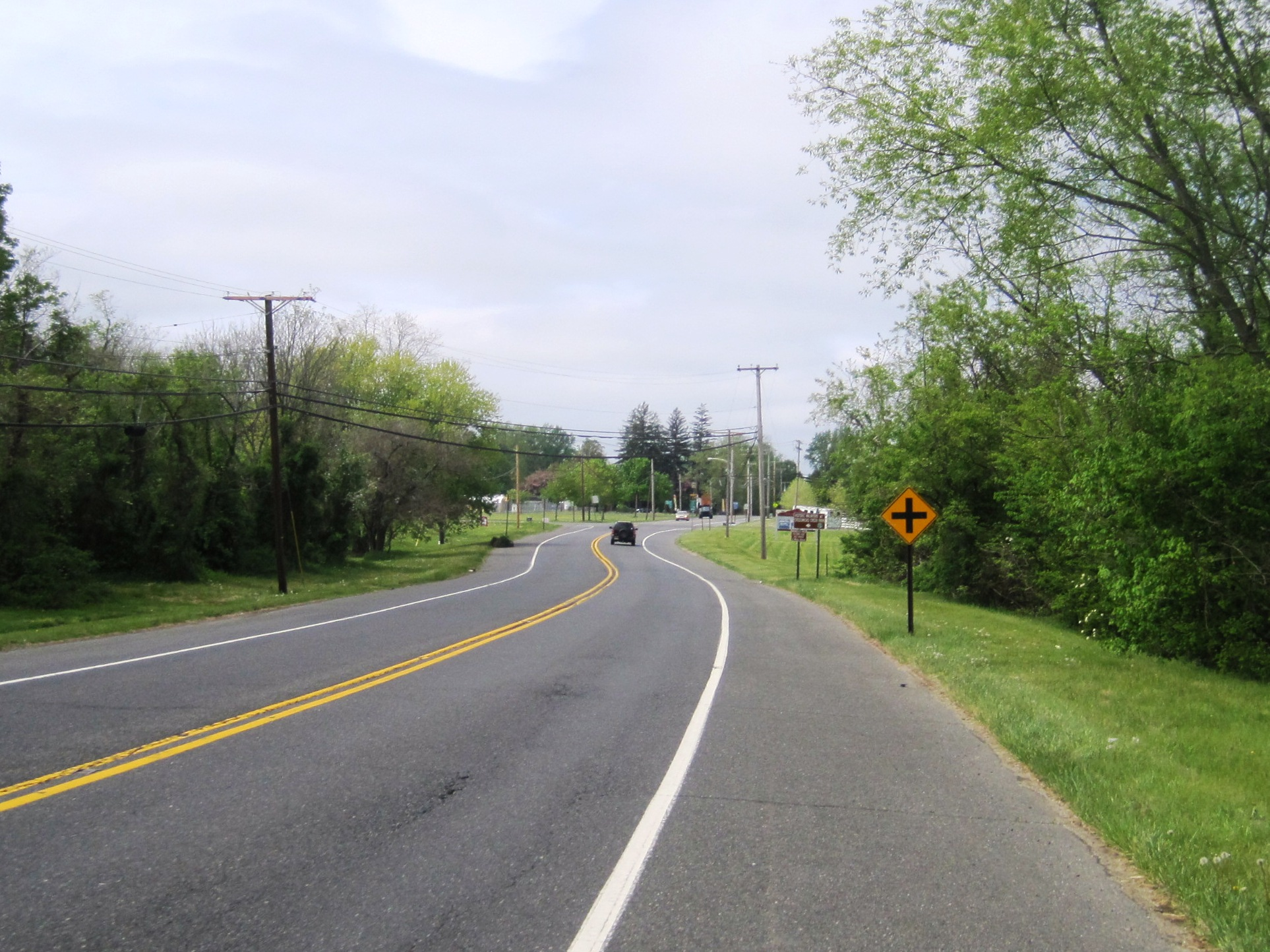
- Center of Cream Ridge at County Route 539 and Burlington Path Road

- Location in Monmouth County Location in New Jersey Location in the United States
- Coordinates: 40°08′06″N 74°31′27″W
- Country: United States
- State: New Jersey
- County: Monmouth
- Township: Upper Freehold

Area
  - Total: 3.04 sq mi (7.88 km^{2})
  - Land: 3.02 sq mi (7.82 km^{2})
  - Water: 0.023 sq mi (0.06 km^{2})
- Elevation: 131 ft (40 m)

Population (2020)
  - Total: 630
  - Density: 208.5/sq mi (80.52/km^{2})
- ZIP Code: 08514
- FIPS code: 34-15730
- GNIS feature ID: 875715

Cream Ridge is an unincorporated community and census-designated place (CDP) in Upper Freehold Township, Monmouth County, New Jersey, United States. As of the 2020 census, the first one for which Cream Ridge was listed, the population was 630.

== History ==
The soil in Cream Ridge is Freehold sandy loam, some of the richest in the state of New Jersey. Many of the early residents became relatively wealthy gentleman farmers, with the actual farm work done by tenant farmers. Most of the early families were Presbyterians, Quakers, or Northern Baptists. Some of the surnames associated with the area are Holmes, Meirs, Rue, Cox, Wright, Lawrence, and Ridgway. The gentleman farmer lifestyle was dramatically curtailed during the Great Depression and after World War II, although remnants of this bygone lifestyle existed into the 1980s.

== Geography ==
Cream Ridge is close to the southwesternmost extent of Monmouth County and occupies the south-central part of Upper Freehold Township. The community is 16 miles (26 km) southeast of Trenton, the state capital, and 18 miles (29 km) southwest of Freehold, the Monmouth county seat.

According to the U.S. Census Bureau, the Cream Ridge CDP has a total area of 3.04 square miles (7.87 km^{2}), of which 0.02 square miles (0.05 km^{2}), or 0.69%, are water. Miry Run flows westward through the community, joining Crosswicks Creek, which forms the western edge of the CDP. Via Crosswicks Creek, the community is part of the Delaware River watershed.

== Demographics ==
Cream Ridge first appeared as a census designated place in the 2020 U.S. census. As of the 2020 United States census, the population was 630.

Historical population
Census	Pop.	Note	%±
2020	630		—
U.S. Decennial Census; 2020

=== 2020 ===
Cream Ridge CDP, New Jersey – Racial and ethnic composition Note: the US Census treats Hispanic/Latino as an ethnic category. This table excludes Latinos from the racial categories and assigns them to a separate category. Hispanics/Latinos may be of any race.
Race / Ethnicity (NH = Non-Hispanic)	Pop 2020	2020
White alone (NH)	512	81.27%
Black or African American alone (NH)	10	1.59%
Native American or Alaska Native alone (NH)	2	0.32%
Asian alone (NH)	46	7.30%
Native Hawaiian or Pacific Islander alone (NH)	0	0.00%
Other race alone (NH)	3	0.48%
Mixed race or Multiracial (NH)	14	2.22%
Hispanic or Latino (any race)	43	6.83%
Total	630	100.00%

== Notable people ==
People who were born in, residents of, or otherwise closely associated with Cream Ridge include:

- Linda K. Meirs (1884–1972), American Red Cross and Army nurse during World War I who was one of the first six American recipients of the Florence Nightingale Medal
- Ross Scheuerman (born 1993), running back for the Hamilton Tiger-Cats of the Canadian Football League
