= Allenstown =

Allenstown may refer to:

- Allenstown, New Hampshire, a town in the United States
- Allenstown, Queensland, a suburb in Rockhampton Region, Australia
