= Allentown, New Jersey =

Borough in Monmouth County, New Jersey, US

- Borough
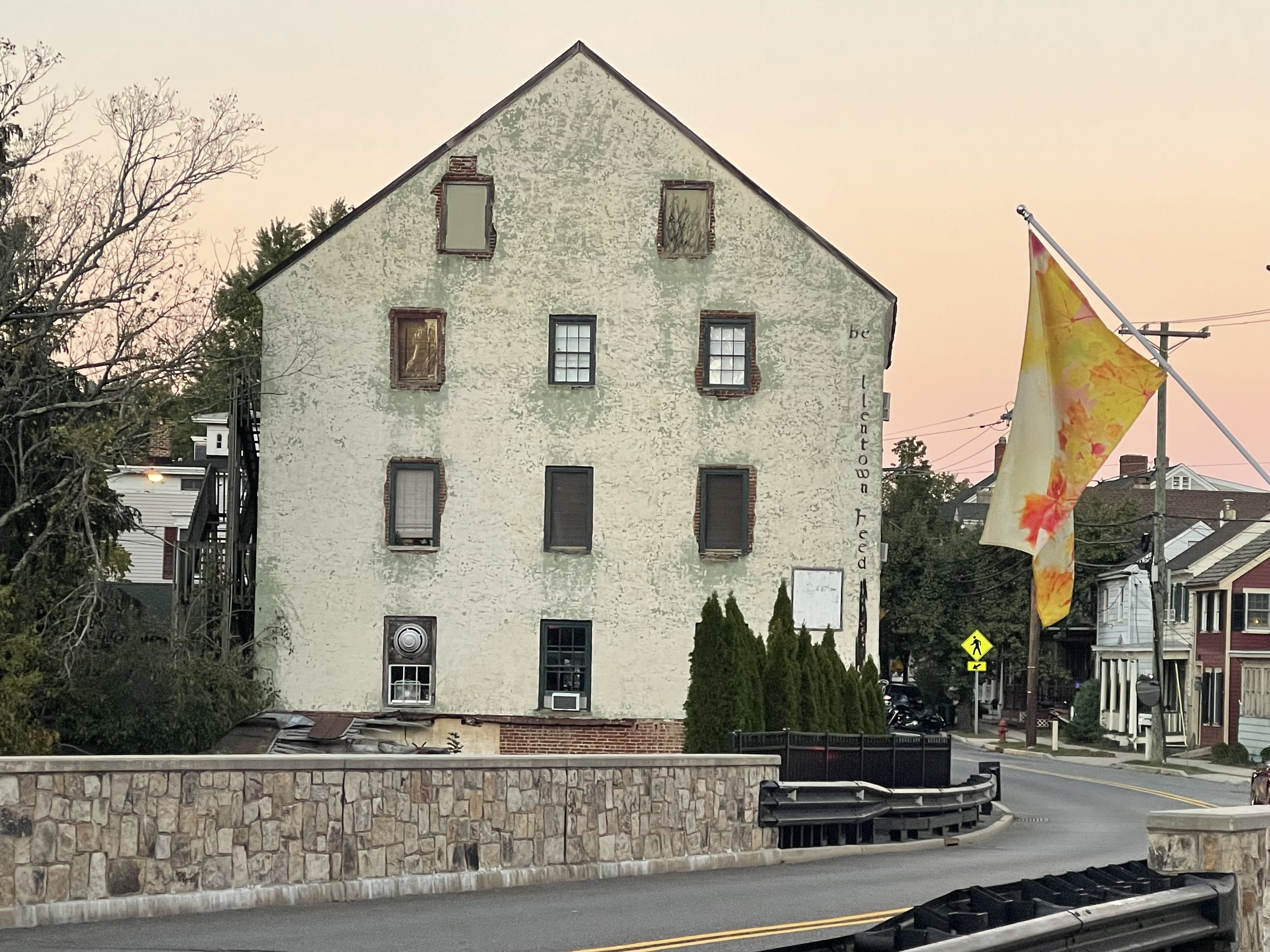
- Allentown Mill in the center of town

- Location of Allentown in Monmouth County highlighted in red (left). Inset map: Location of Monmouth County in New Jersey highlighted in orange (right).

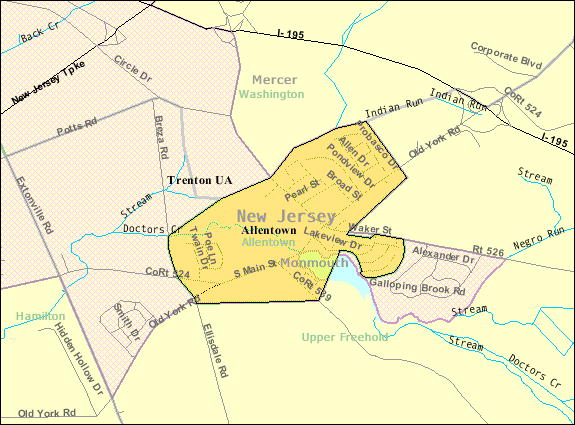
- Census Bureau map of Allentown, New Jersey
- Interactive map of Allentown, New Jersey
- Location in Monmouth County Location in New Jersey Location in the United States
- Coordinates: 40.178578°N 74.590056°W
- Country: United States
- State: New Jersey
- County: Monmouth
- Incorporated: January 29, 1889
- Named for: Nathan Allen or William Allen

Government
  - Type: Borough
  - Body: Borough Council
  - Mayor: Thomas C. Fritts (I, term ends December 31, 2027)
  - Borough administrator / Municipal clerk: Laurie A. Roth

Area
  - Total: 0.62 sq mi (1.61 km^{2})
  - Land: 0.59 sq mi (1.54 km^{2})
  - Water: 0.023 sq mi (0.06 km^{2}) 4.03%
  - Rank: 537th of 565 in state 45th of 53 in county
- Elevation: 75 ft (23 m)

Population (2020)
  - Total: 1,734
  - Estimate (2023): 1,724
  - Rank: 498th of 565 in state 44th of 53 in county
  - Density: 2,908.5/sq mi (1,123.0/km^{2})
  - Rank: 223rd of 565 in state 26th of 53 in county
- Time zone: UTC−05:00 (Eastern (EST))
  - Summer (DST): UTC−04:00 (Eastern (EDT))
- ZIP Code: 08501
- Area codes: 609 Exchanges: 259, 752, 758
- FIPS code: 3402500760
- GNIS feature ID: 0885137
- Website: www.allentownboronj.com

Allentown is a borough located in western Monmouth County, in the U.S. state of New Jersey, bordering adjacent Mercer County. As of the 2020 United States census, the borough's population was 1,734, a decrease of 94 (−5.1%) from the 2010 census count of 1,828, which in turn reflected a decline of 54 (−2.9%) from the 1,882 counted in the 2000 census. The borough is nestled within central New Jersey, and is roughly equidistant between New York City and Philadelphia.

== History ==
Allentown was incorporated as a borough by an act of the New Jersey Legislature on January 29, 1889, from portions of Upper Freehold Township, based on the results of a referendum held that day. The borough was named for settler Robert Burnet's son-in-law, Nathan Allen or for William Allen, who served as Chief Justice of the Province of Pennsylvania.

== Geography ==
According to the U.S. Census Bureau, the borough had a total area of 0.62 square miles (1.61 km^{2}), including 0.60 square miles (1.54 km^{2}) of land and 0.03 square miles (0.06 km^{2}) of water (4.03%).

Allentown borders the municipalities of Upper Freehold Township in Monmouth County and Robbinsville Township in Mercer County.

== Economy ==
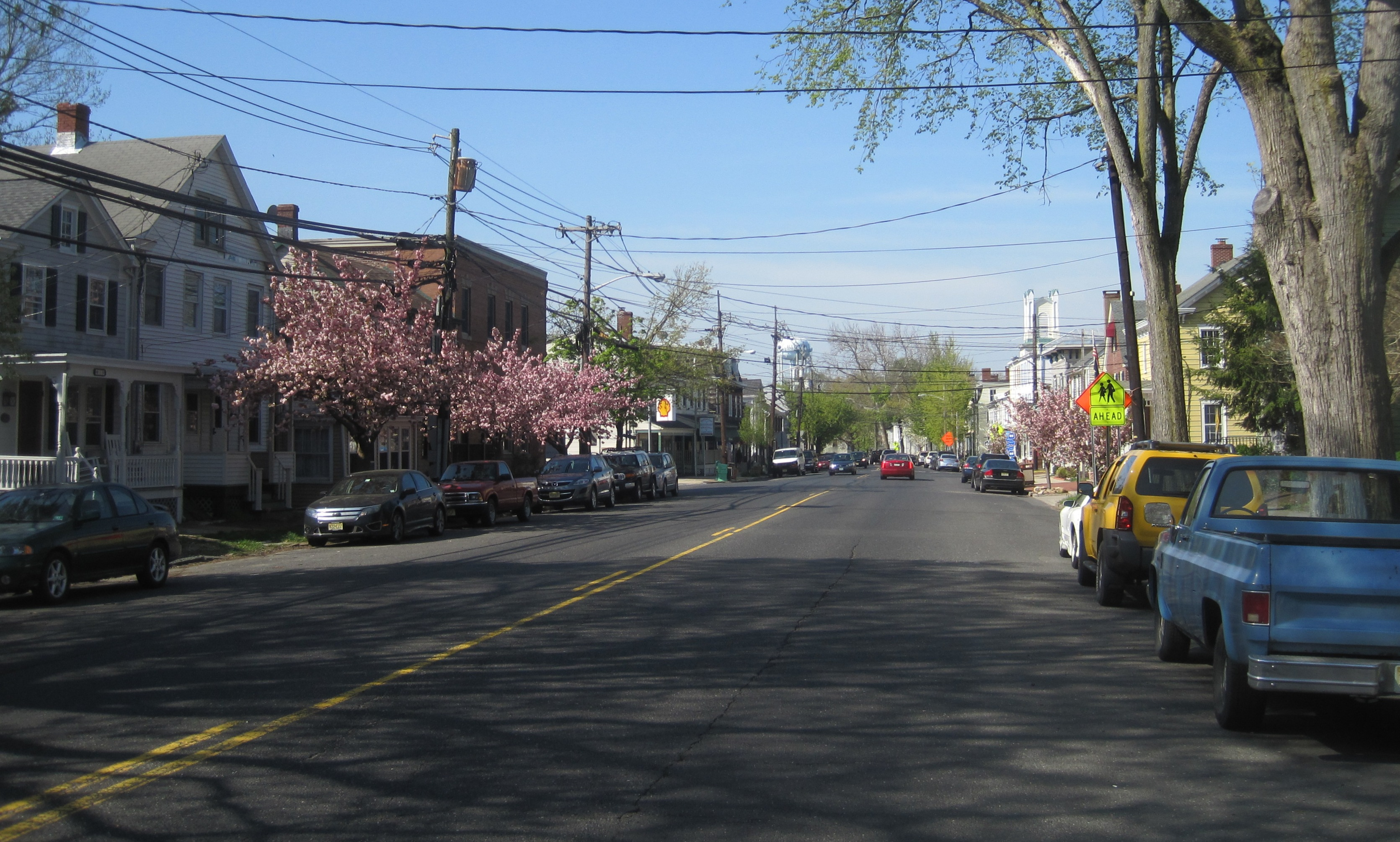
Downtown Allentown

Allentown's shopping district has antique and specialty shops, as well as restaurants. Many historic homes and historic buildings are located in the borough. The Horse Park of New Jersey is a park located near the borough but does have an Allentown mailing address. Heritage Park is located within the borough near the shopping district.

The borough received the 'Village Center' designation in 2002, which will allow the borough to receive additional state aid aimed at preserving historic and natural resource sites that are at risk.

For larger scaled shopping, Freehold Raceway Mall in nearby Freehold, Quaker Bridge Mall in nearby Lawrence, and Princeton Market Fair in nearby West Windsor, are a short distance away.

== Demographics ==
Historical population
Census	Pop.	Note	%±
1900	695		—
1910	634		−8.8%
1920	634		0.0%
1930	706		11.4%
1940	766		8.5%
1950	931		21.5%
1960	1,393		49.6%
1970	1,603		15.1%
1980	1,962		22.4%
1990	1,828		−6.8%
2000	1,882		3.0%
2010	1,828		−2.9%
2020	1,734		−5.1%
2023 (est.)	1,724	▼	−0.6%
Population sources: 1900–1920; 1900–1910 1910–1930; 1940–2000; 2010 2020

=== 2010 census ===
The 2010 United States census counted 1,828 people, 704 households, and 499 families in the borough. The population density was 3,023.9 per square mile (1,167.5/km^{2}). There were 735 housing units at an average density of 1,215.8 per square mile (469.4/km^{2}). The racial makeup was 90.97% (1,663) White, 4.43% (81) Black or African American, 0.11% (2) Native American, 1.53% (28) Asian, 0.00% (0) Pacific Islander, 0.88% (16) from other races, and 2.08% (38) from two or more races. Hispanic or Latino of any race were 3.56% (65) of the population.

Of the 704 households, 33.7% had children under the age of 18; 54.8% were married couples living together; 12.1% had a female householder with no husband present and 29.1% were non-families. Of all households, 22.7% were made up of individuals and 7.8% had someone living alone who was 65 years of age or older. The average household size was 2.60 and the average family size was 3.11.

24.8% of the population were under the age of 18, 7.3% from 18 to 24, 22.2% from 25 to 44, 34.4% from 45 to 64, and 11.4% who were 65 years of age or older. The median age was 42.4 years. For every 100 females, the population had 90.8 males. For every 100 females ages 18 and older there were 89.7 males.

The Census Bureau's 2006–2010 American Community Survey showed that (in 2010 inflation-adjusted dollars) median household income was $93,250 (with a margin of error of +/− $15,183) and the median family income was $101,875 (+/− $5,413). Males had a median income of $75,125 (+/− $13,989) versus $55,119 (+/− $7,348) for females. The per capita income for the borough was $36,970 (+/− $2,599). About 1.8% of families and 1.3% of the population were below the poverty line, including 0.8% of those under age 18 and 2.5% of those age 65 or over.

=== 2000 census ===
As of the 2000 United States census there were 1,882 people, 708 households, and 526 families residing in the borough. The population density was 3,097.1 inhabitants per square mile (1,195.8/km^{2}). There were 718 housing units at an average density of 1,181.6 per square mile (456.2/km^{2}). The racial makeup of the borough was 90.65% White, 6.43% African American, 0.58% Native American, 0.64% Asian, 0.58% from other races, and 1.12% from two or more races. Hispanic or Latino of any race were 1.91% of the population.

There were 708 households, out of which 36.4% had children under the age of 18 living with them, 63.1% were married couples living together, 8.8% had a female householder with no husband present, and 25.6% were non-families. 21.3% of all households were made up of individuals, and 5.5% had someone living alone who was 65 years of age or older. The average household size was 2.66 and the average family size was 3.13.

In the borough the population was spread out, with 26.7% under the age of 18, 5.2% from 18 to 24, 32.5% from 25 to 44, 25.8% from 45 to 64, and 9.8% who were 65 years of age or older. The median age was 38 years. For every 100 females, there were 89.7 males. For every 100 females age 18 and over, there were 89.9 males.

The median income for a household in the borough was $71,193, and the median income for a family was $79,843. Males had a median income of $55,441 versus $38,667 for females. The per capita income for the borough was $29,455. About 1.0% of families and 2.3% of the population were below the poverty line, including 2.6% of those under age 18 and 2.1% of those age 65 or over.

== Government ==
=== Local government ===
Allentown is governed under the borough form of New Jersey municipal government, which is used in 218 municipalities (of the 564) statewide, making it the most common form of government in New Jersey. The governing body is comprised of the mayor and the borough council, with all positions elected at-large on a partisan basis as part of the November general election. The mayor is elected directly by the voters to a four-year term of office. The borough council includes six members elected to serve three-year terms on a staggered basis, with two seats coming up for election each year in a three-year cycle. The borough form of government used by Allentown is a "weak mayor / strong council" government in which council members act as the legislative body with the mayor presiding at meetings and voting only in the event of a tie. The mayor can veto ordinances subject to an override by a two-thirds majority vote of the council. The mayor makes committee and liaison assignments for council members, and most appointments are made by the mayor with the advice and consent of the council.

As of 2025, the mayor of Allentown is Independent Thomas C. Fritts, whose term of office ends December 31, 2027. Members of the Borough Council are Council President John A. Elder III (I, 2026), Nikki A. Darling (D, 2027), Erica DeKranes (I, 2026), Michael Drennan (I, 2027), Martha A. Johnson (I, 2025) and Daniel Payson (I, 2025).

With only one candidate on the ballot for the two available seats in the November 2021 general election, Nikki Darling won a seat on the borough council after receiving 159 write-in votes.

=== Federal, state, and county representation ===
Allentown is located in the 3rd Congressional district and is part of New Jersey's 12th state legislative district.

For the 119th United States Congress, New Jersey's 3rd congressional district is currently represented Herb Conaway (D, Delran Township). New Jersey is represented in the United States Senate by Democrats Cory Booker (Newark, term ends 2027) and Andy Kim (Moorestown, term ends 2031).

For the 2026–2027 session, the 12th legislative district of the New Jersey Legislature is represented in the State Senate by Owen Henry (R, Old Bridge Township) and in the General Assembly by Robert D. Clifton (R, Matawan) and Alex Sauickie (R, Jackson Township).

Monmouth County is governed by a Board of County Commissioners composed of five members who are elected at-large to serve three-year terms of office on a staggered basis, with either one or two seats up for election each year as part of the November general election. At an annual reorganization meeting held in the beginning of January, the board selects one of its members to serve as director and another as deputy director.

As of 2025, Monmouth County's Commissioners are Director Thomas A. Arnone (R, Neptune City, 2025), Susan M. Kiley (R, Hazlet Township, 2027), Erik Anderson (R, Shrewsbury, 2026), Nick DiRocco (R, Wall Township, 2025), and Deputy Director Ross F. Licitra (R, Marlboro Township, 2026).

Constitutional officers elected on a countywide basis are Clerk Christine Giordano Hanlon (R, 2025; Ocean Township), Sheriff Shaun Golden (R, 2025; Howell Township) and Surrogate Rosemarie D. Peters (R, 2026; Middletown Township).

=== Politics ===
United States presidential election results for Allentown
Year	Republican		Democratic		Third party(ies)	
Year	No.	%	No.	%	No.	%
2024	477	42.59%	622	55.54%	21	1.88%
2020	509	42.14%	680	56.29%	19	1.57%
2016	481	45.04%	545	51.03%	42	3.93%
2012	403	41.94%	540	56.19%	18	1.87%
2008	446	43.01%	576	55.54%	15	1.45%
2004	488	49.39%	489	49.49%	11	1.11%
2000	378	41.81%	460	50.88%	66	7.30%
1996	336	41.90%	372	46.38%	94	11.72%
1992	327	39.35%	319	38.39%	185	22.26%

As of March 2011, there were a total of 1,255 registered voters in Allentown, of which 327 (26.1%) were registered as Democrats, 340 (27.1%) were registered as Republicans and 586 (46.7%) were registered as Unaffiliated. There were 2 voters registered as either Libertarians or Greens.

In the 2012 presidential election, Democrat Barack Obama received 56.2% of the vote (540 cast), ahead of Republican Mitt Romney with 41.9% (403 votes), and other candidates with 1.9% (18 votes), among the 964 ballots cast by the borough's 1,312 registered voters (3 ballots were spoiled), for a turnout of 73.5%. In the 2008 presidential election, Democrat Barack Obama received 54.7% of the vote (576 cast), ahead of Republican John McCain with 42.4% (446 votes) and other candidates with 1.4% (15 votes), among the 1,053 ballots cast by the borough's 1,334 registered voters, for a turnout of 78.9%. In the 2004 presidential election, Democrat John Kerry received 49.3% of the vote (489 ballots cast), outpolling Republican George W. Bush with 49.2% (488 votes) and other candidates with 0.8% (11 votes), among the 991 ballots cast by the borough's 1,317 registered voters, for a turnout percentage of 75.2.

Gubernatorial election results for Allentown
Year	Republican		Democratic		Third party(ies)	
Year	No.	%	No.	%	No.	%
2025	377	39.64%	568	59.73%	6	0.63%
2021	380	46.00%	440	53.27%	6	0.73%
2017	358	47.48%	381	50.53%	15	1.99%
2013	436	61.67%	259	36.63%	12	1.70%
2009	397	54.91%	269	37.21%	57	7.88%
2005	252	42.28%	296	49.66%	48	8.05%

In the 2013 gubernatorial election, Republican Chris Christie received 61.7% of the vote (436 cast), ahead of Democrat Barbara Buono with 36.6% (259 votes), and other candidates with 1.7% (12 votes), among the 718 ballots cast by the borough's 1,319 registered voters (11 ballots were spoiled), for a turnout of 54.4%. In the 2009 gubernatorial election, Republican Chris Christie received 54.7% of the vote (397 ballots cast), ahead of Democrat Jon Corzine with 36.8% (267 votes), Independent Chris Daggett with 6.7% (49 votes) and other candidates with 1.1% (8 votes), among the 726 ballots cast by the borough's 1,283 registered voters, yielding a 56.6% turnout.

United States Senate election results for Allentown1
Year	Republican		Democratic		Third party(ies)	
Year	No.	%	No.	%	No.	%
2024	434	39.31%	647	58.61%	23	2.08%
2018	422	44.47%	486	51.21%	41	4.32%
2012	393	43.33%	486	53.58%	28	3.09%
2006	316	48.02%	318	48.33%	24	3.65%

United States Senate election results for Allentown2
Year	Republican		Democratic		Third party(ies)	
Year	No.	%	No.	%	No.	%
2020	500	41.98%	650	54.58%	41	3.44%
2014	264	43.78%	320	53.07%	19	3.15%
2013	176	43.78%	214	53.23%	12	2.99%
2008	468	49.32%	454	47.84%	27	2.85%

== Education ==
Students in public school for kindergarten through twelfth grade attend the schools of the Upper Freehold Regional School District, together with students from Upper Freehold Township. Millstone Township sends students to the district's high school as part of a sending/receiving relationship with the Millstone Township Schools. As of the 2021–22 school year, the district, comprised of three schools, had an enrollment of 2,124 students and 176.2 classroom teachers (on an FTE basis), for a student–teacher ratio of 12.1:1. Schools in the district (with 2021–22 enrollment data from the National Center for Education Statistics) are Newell Elementary School with 516 students in grades PreK-4, Stone Bridge Middle School with 460 students in grades 5-8 and Allentown High School with 1,131 students in grades 9-12. The operations of the district are overseen by a nine-member board of education, with the board's trustees elected directly by voters to serve three-year terms of office on a staggered basis, with three seats up for election each year. The nine seats are allocated to the two constituent municipalities based on population, with four assigned to Allentown.

== Historic district ==
- Allentown Historic District
- U.S. National Register of Historic Places
- U.S. Historic district
- New Jersey Register of Historic Places
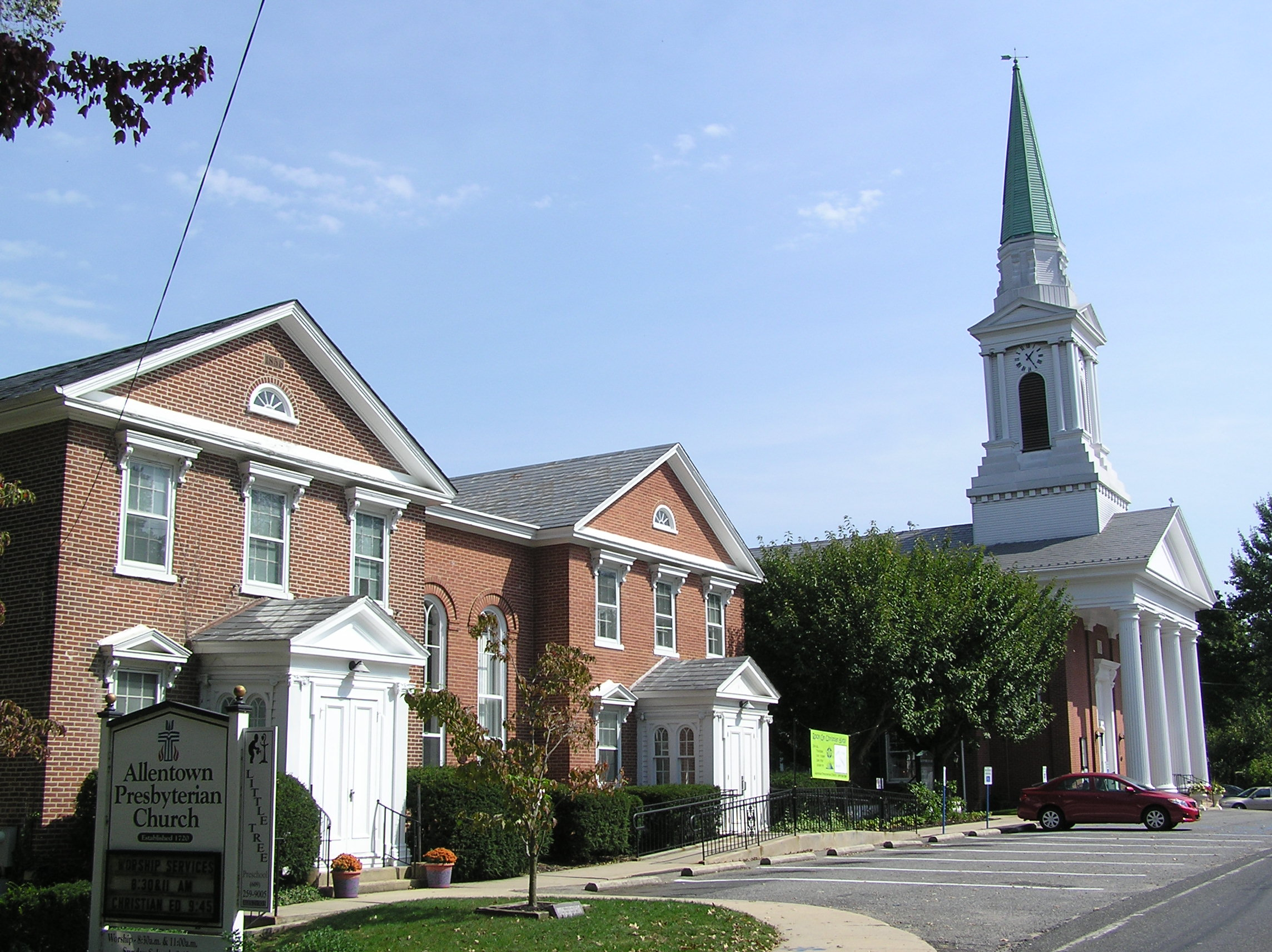
- Allentown Presbyterian Church
- Location: Portions of North and South Main streets, Church, Pearl and Hamilton streets, Lakeview Drive and Yardville Road.
- Area: 17 acres (6.9 ha)
- Architectural style: Late Victorian, Georgian, Federal
- NRHP reference No.: 82003284
- NJRHP No.: 1949

Significant dates
- Added to NRHP: June 14, 1982
- Designated NJRHP: October 29, 1981

The Allentown Historic District is a 17-acre (6.9 ha) historic district encompassing the community along North and South Main streets, Church, Pearl and Hamilton streets, Lakeview Drive and Yardville Road. It was added to the National Register of Historic Places on June 14, 1982, for its significance in architecture, commerce, education, industry, invention, religion, and transportation. The district includes 219 contributing buildings, including the Allentown Mill, which was added individually to the NRHP in 1978.

The Allentown Presbyterian Church was built in 1837, expanded in 1858, and features Greek Revival architecture. The Georgian-style John Imlay House, built c. 1790, was documented by the Historic American Buildings Survey in 1936. The Ephraim Robbins House now serves as the Borough Hall. The former First Baptist Church is now used by the Allentown Public Library Association.

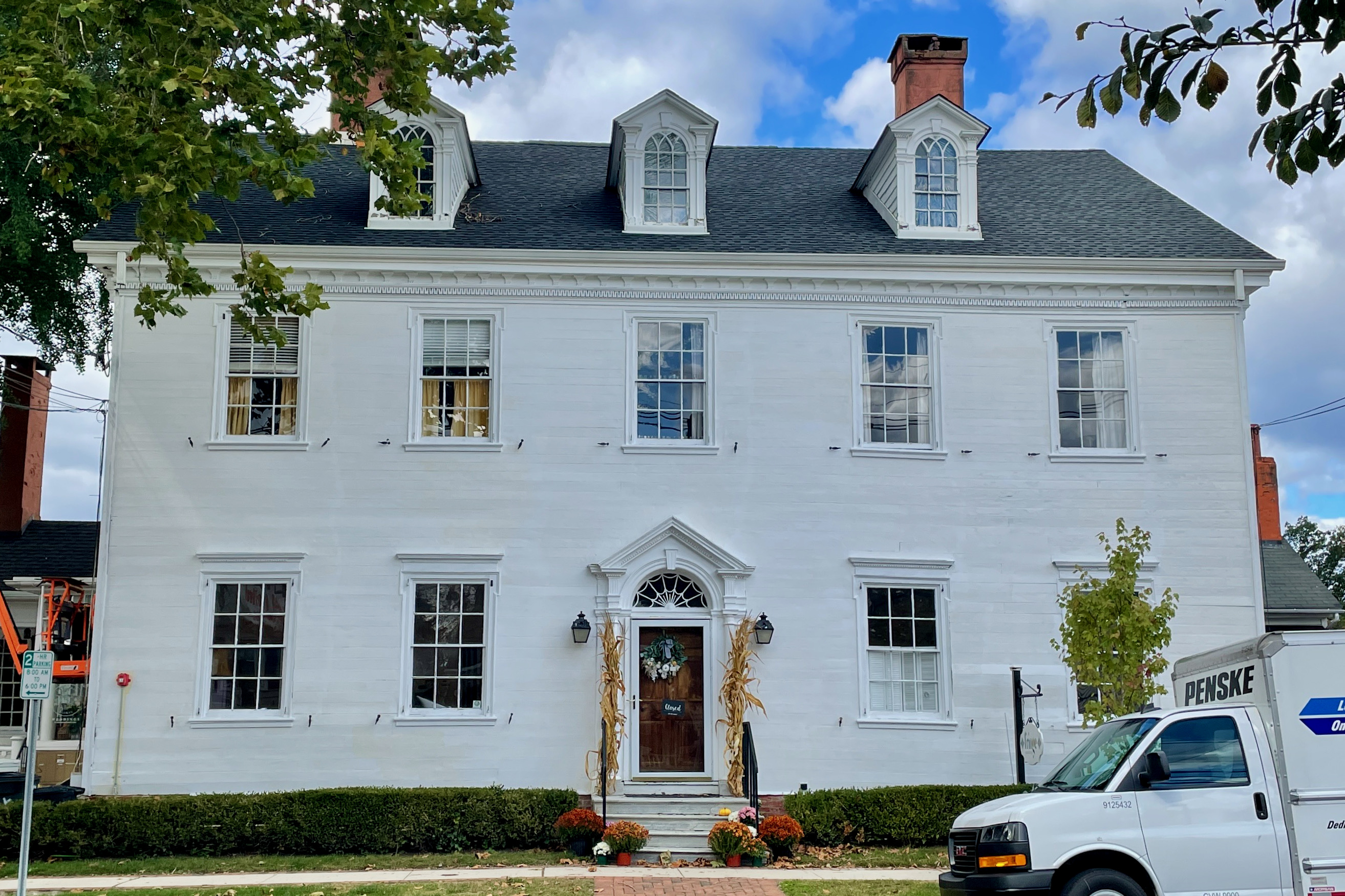
John Imlay House

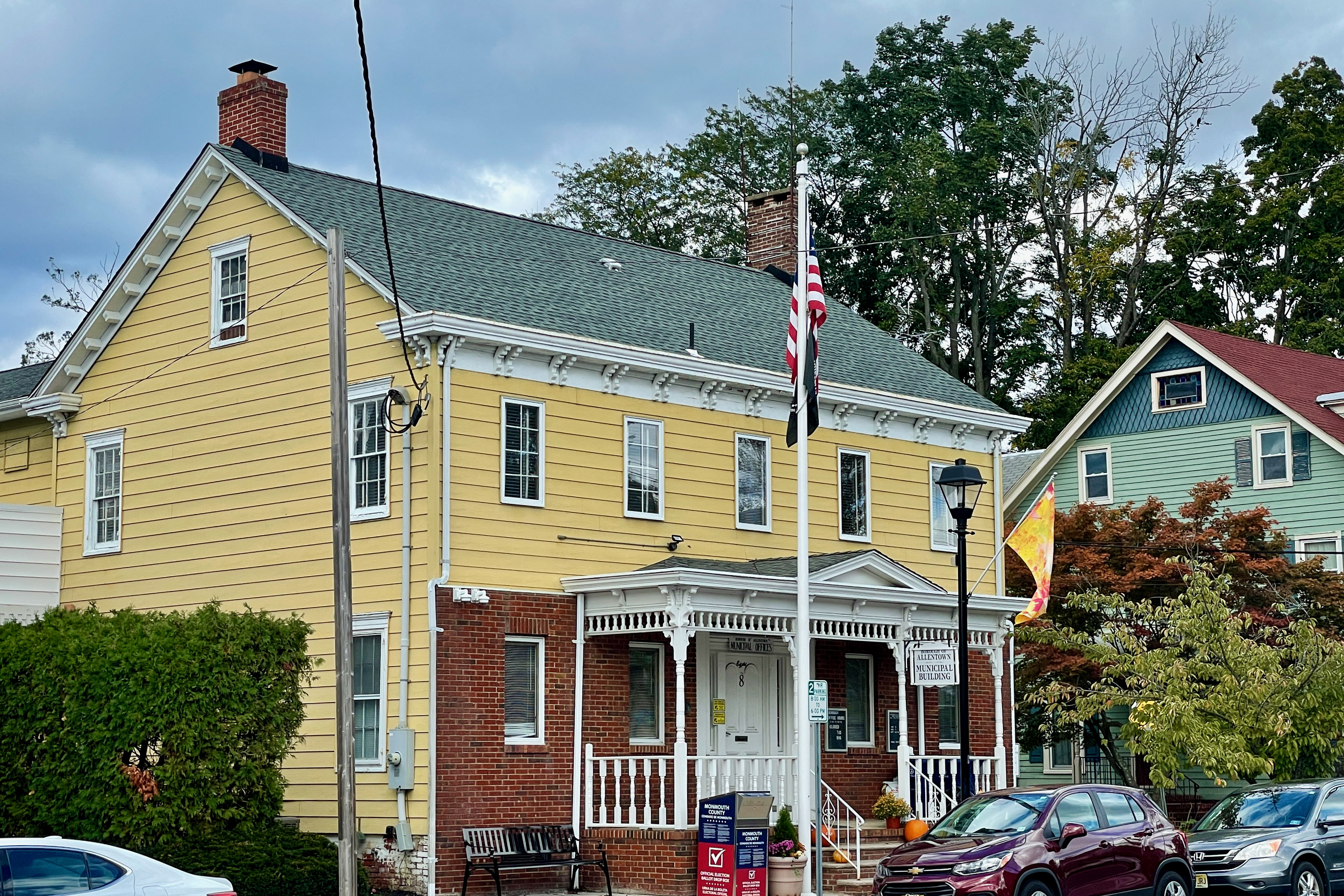
Ephraim Robbins House

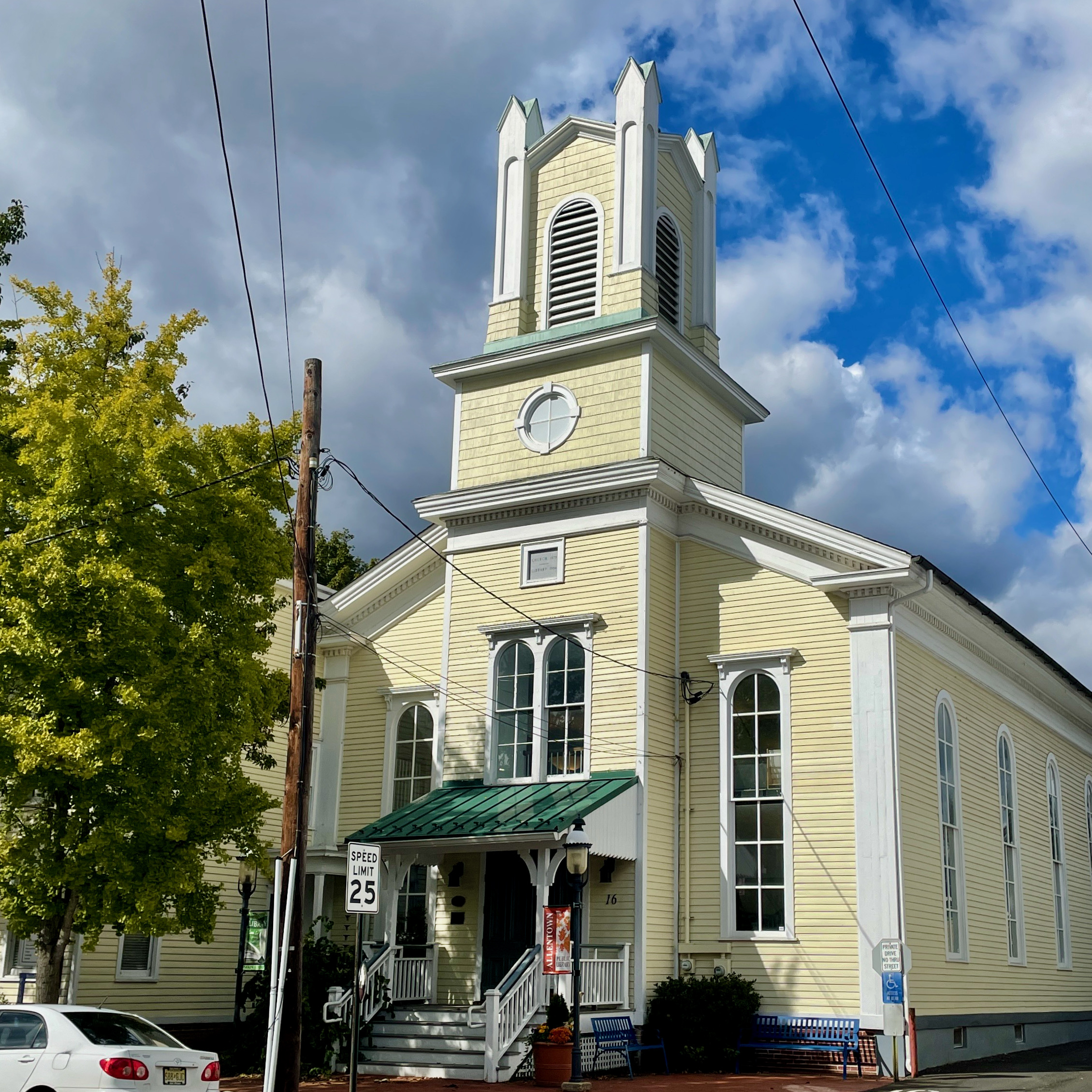
Former First Baptist Church

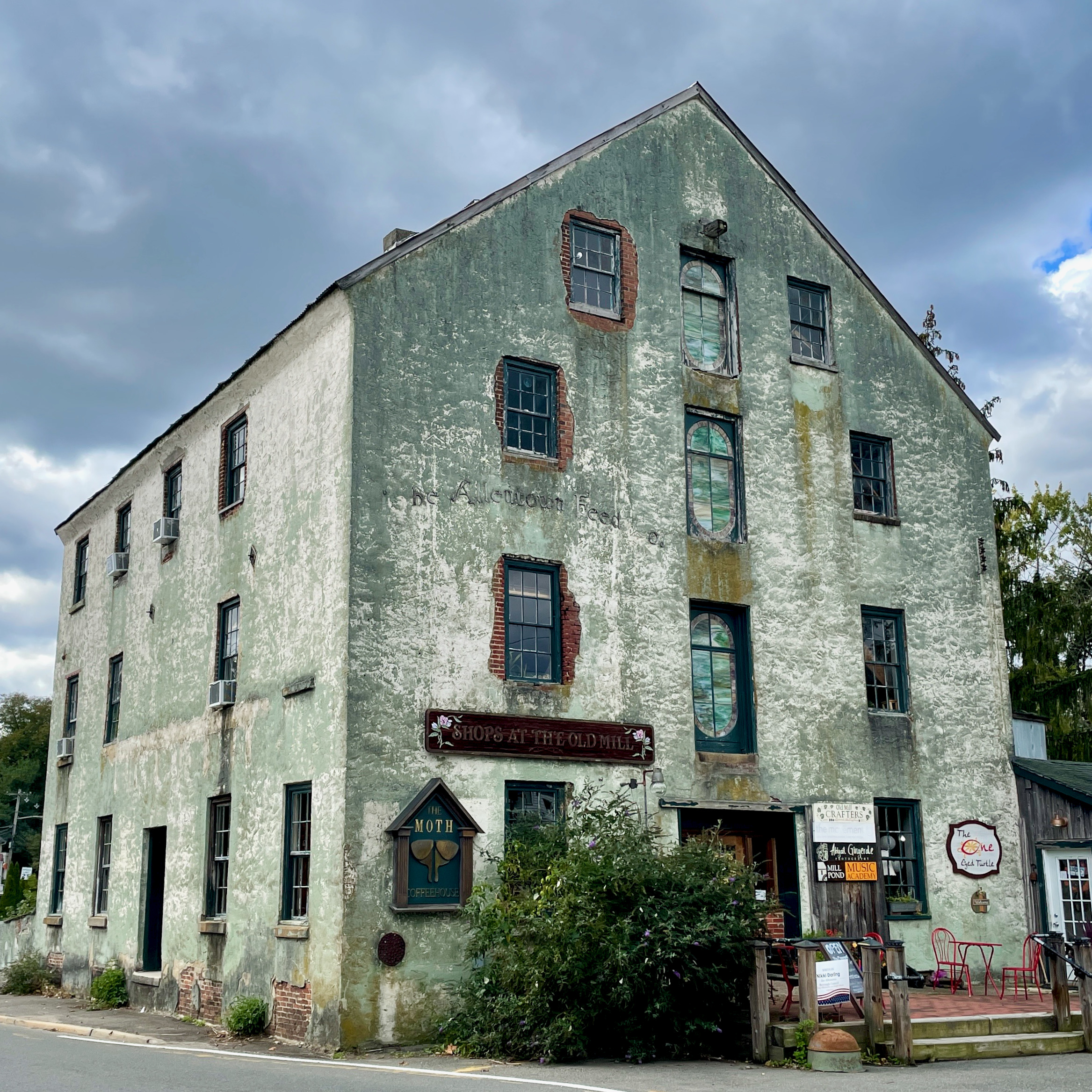
Allentown Mill

== Transportation ==
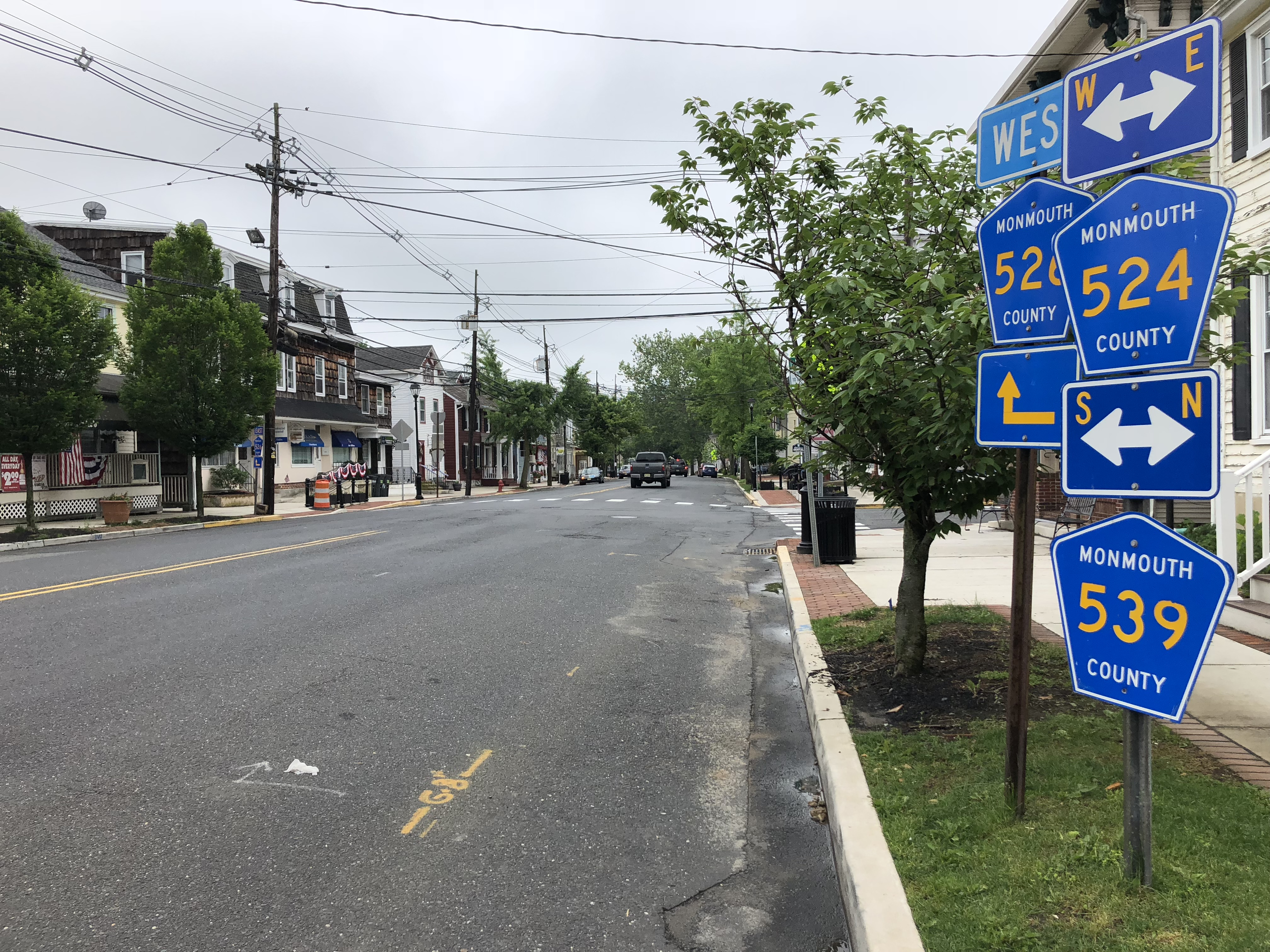
CR 524, CR 526 and CR 539 all converge in downtown Allentown

As of May 2010, the borough had a total of 6.84 miles (11.01 km) of roadways, of which 4.55 miles (7.32 km) were maintained by the municipality and 2.29 miles (3.69 km) by Monmouth County.

The only major roads that pass through are CR 524, CR 526 and CR 539.

Limited access roads that are accessible just outside the borough include Interstate 195 and the New Jersey Turnpike (Interstate 95).

Allentown is about one hour southwest of Manhattan via the Turnpike and about 50 minutes northeast of Philadelphia. Both Princeton and Trenton are easily accessible from Allentown via I-195.

== Notable people ==
People who were born in, residents of, or otherwise closely associated with Allentown include:

- Doc Imlay (1889–1948), Major League Baseball pitcher who played for the Philadelphia Phillies in nine games during the 1913 Philadelphia Phillies season
- William Longstreet (1759–1814), inventor who designed an improved cotton gin, a portable sawmill, and builder of a small steamboat that worked on the Savannah River
- Tom McCarthy (born 1968), TV announcer for the Philadelphia Phillies
- Linda K. Meirs (1884–1972), American Red Cross and Army nurse during World War I who was one of the first six American recipients of the Florence Nightingale Medal
- George Middleton (1800–1888), represented New Jersey's 2nd congressional district from 1863 to 1865
- John B. Montgomery (1794–1872), United States Navy officer during the American Civil War, who later commanded the Pacific Squadron
- William A. Newell (1817–1901), physician and politician
- George R. Robbins (1814–1875), politician who represented New Jersey's 2nd congressional district in the United States House of Representatives from 1855 to 1859
- Warren Lincoln Rogers (1877–1938), bishop of the Episcopal Diocese of Ohio from 1930 to 1938
- Billy Schuler (born 1990), soccer player for the Carolina RailHawks in the North American Soccer League
