= 1989 Huntsville tornado =

Tornado in Alabama, United States

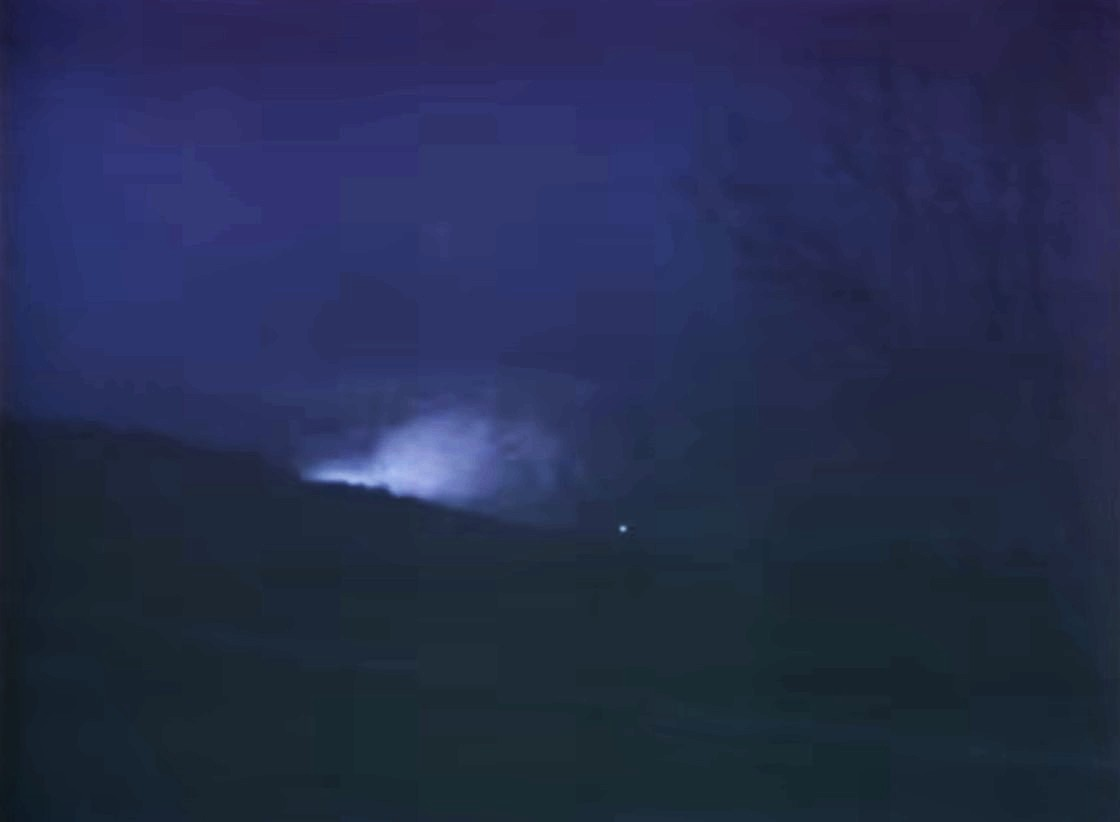
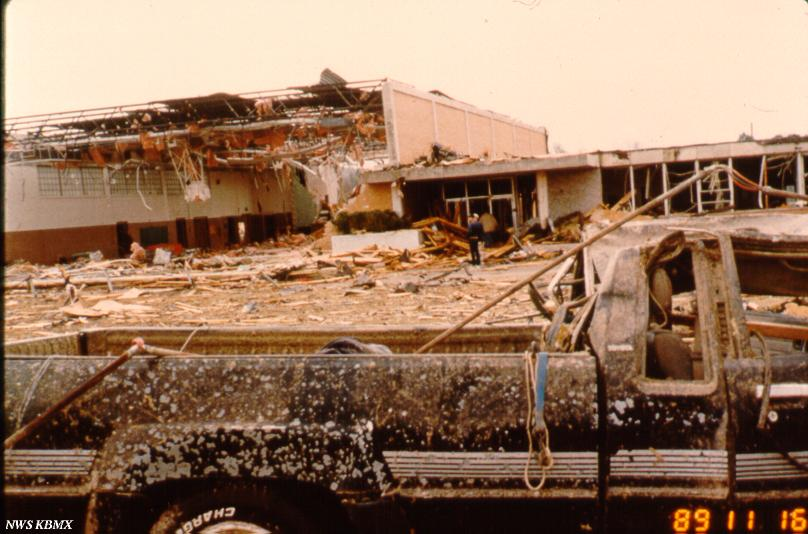
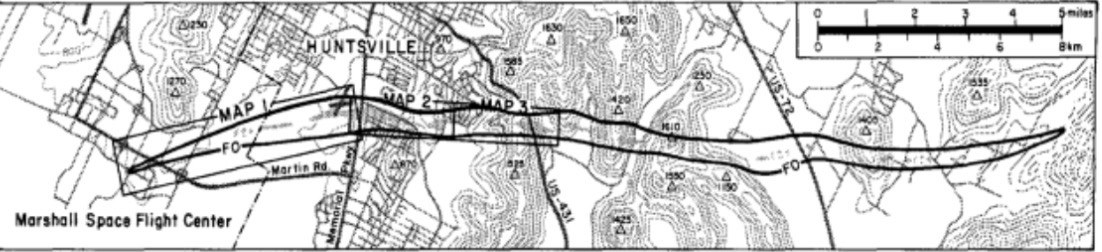
- Clockwise from top: The tornado at peak intensity being illuminated by power flashes as seen from a mountain top camera; The path of the tornado across southern Huntsville; Damage of the tornado.

Meteorological history
- Formed: November 15, 1989, 4:30 p.m. CST (UTC-06:00)
- Dissipated: November 15, 1989, 4:50 p.m. CST (UTC-06:00)
- Duration: 20 minutes

F4 tornado
- on the Fujita scale
- Max width: 880 yards (0.50 mi; 0.80 km)
- Path length: 18.5 miles (29.8 km)
- Highest winds: 225–250 mph (362–402 km/h)

Overall effects
- Fatalities: 21
- Injuries: 463
- Damage: $250 million (1989 USD)
- Areas affected: Madison County, specifically, Huntsville
- Part of the November 1989 tornado outbreak and Tornadoes of 1989

On the afternoon of November 15, 1989, a destructive and fatal F4 tornado struck Huntsville, Alabama. 21 people were killed by the tornado, with an additional 463 injuries. Of those 21 fatalities, 12 of them were in automobiles. The tornado destroyed 259 homes, and two schools. The tornado caused $250,000,000 (1989 USD) in damages across its 18.5 mile (29.8 kilometer) track. The tornado was on the ground for 20 minutes. As of 2019, it is the deadliest tornado in Huntsville’s history.

== Meteorological synopsis ==
=== Synoptics ===
A shortwave trough was located in the Rocky Mountains. The trough was forecast to take on a negative tilt by 6:00 a.m. CST on November 15. Alongside the trough was a cold front moving eastward. Intense 50 knot winds in the 500 mb level along the cold front were expected to intensify to 70 knots by the 15th. The 850 mb jet also expected to intensify, this time to 40 knots. As the jet streak in the 500 mb level moved into the Tennessee Valley, it intensified to over 90 knots. Unstable air was pulled northward by an intensifying low level jet within the warm sector. Positive vorticity advection and warm air were forecasted. Temperatures were up to 80°F (27° C). Dew points at this time were in the upper 60°s F. Multiple mesolows developed along the cold front, further strengthening wind shear.

=== Close range forecast ===
Severe weather on November 15 was first noted 2 days prior, on November 13. The threat for severe weather was highlighted by a State Forecast Discussion. Within the discussion had mentions of a squall line advancing though Alabama on the 15th. At 4:03 p.m. CST on November 13, the Alabama Zone Forecast had thunderstorms moving the state on the “fourth period” of the 15th.

The following day, on November 14, it became clear that severe weather was likely on November 15. A State Forecast Discussion was issued in the early morning. The discussion mentioned the possibility of thunderstorms ahead of the cold front. The Huntsville local forecast that day talked about the forecasted showers and thunderstorms on the 15th. By the afternoon of November 14, a squall line was expected to produce severe weather. The cold front was expected to be in northwest Alabama by the evening of November 15.

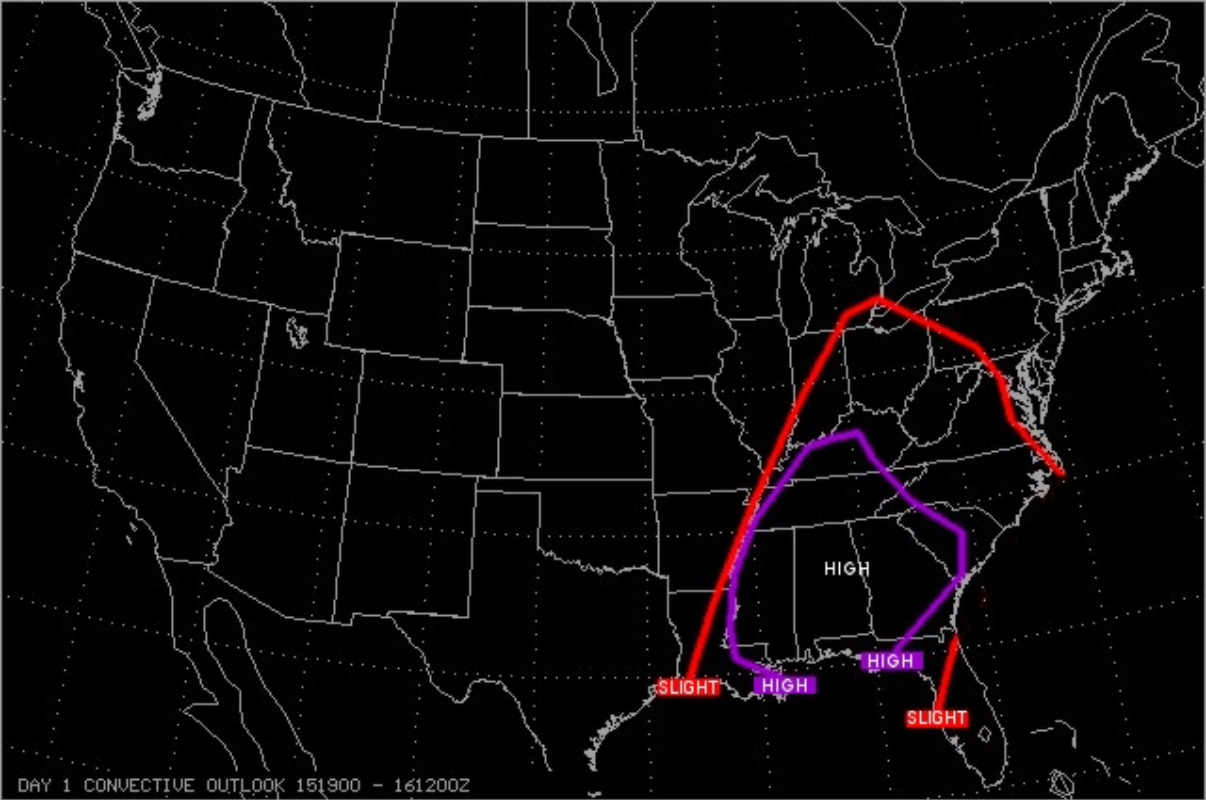
The 2:00 p.m. CST National Severe Storms Forecast Center convective outlook

At 12:16 a.m. CST, on November 15, a moderate risk for severe weather was outlined. Alabama was mostly covered by the risk. The State Forecast Discussion on the 15th emphasized the severe weather threat that afternoon. Following the discussion, a special weather statement was issued, further highlighting the severe weather threat. Later that morning, a public severe weather outlook was issued. The possibility of a tornado outbreak was stressed within the outlook. Later in the day, at 9:30 a.m. CST, a high risk for severe weather was outlined by the National Severe Storms Forecast Center. Following the outlook, a special weather statement was issued by the National Weather Service in Birmingham, Alabama.

“MAJOR SEVERE WEATHER THREAT POISED FOR ALABAMA AND NORTHWEST FLORIDA”. -NWS Birmingham Special Weather Statement, 10:50 a.m. CST, November 15, 1989.

The Alabama Weather Summary had two paragraphs to talk about the potentially dangerous situation. At 12:30 p.m. CST, a tornado watch was issued for portions of Alabama. Even later in the day, at 2:00 p.m. CST, the high risk was expanded to include portions of South Carolina.

=== Preparations ===
Emergency management were notified of the tornado watch. A weather radio spotter network was activated due to the tornado watch. Law enforcement along with emergency management agencies were encouraged to make sure they had enough staffing for the evening of the 15th.

== Tornado summary ==
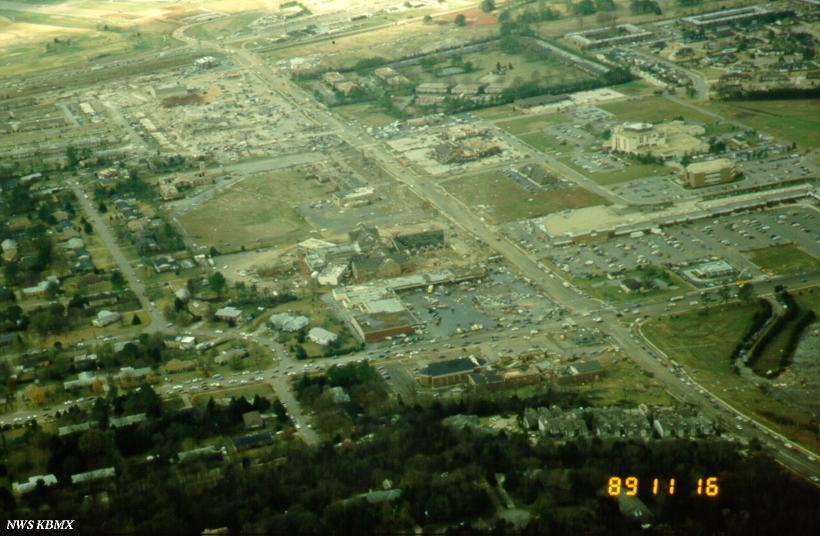
An aerial photograph of Airport Road after the tornado.

At 4:30 p.m. CST, the tornado touched down 1 mile southwest of Madkin Mountain in Redstone Arsenal. The tornado moved north of the Marshall Space Flight Center at F0 intensity. It intensified to F1 intensity as it directly impacted a trash burning plant. East of the plant, concrete poles were snapped. Nearby the tornado left markings on the ground. Crops were blown down. The tornado moved northeastward, striking the Huntsville Police Academy, along with a golf course. The tornado entered a heavily populated area of Huntsville near U.S. Highway 231. At this point, the tornado began rapidly intensifying, occasionally reaching F4 intensity. Multiple shopping complexes and offices were destroyed along this road. Vehicles on the road were thrown. At this time, a tornado warning was issued for the town. An apartment between Highway 231 and Airport road had half of its second floor removed. The Westbury Mall within Huntsville was completely destroyed. The tornado crossed Airport road and Whitesburg road. Majority of the fatalities occurred between these two roads. Most of the fatalities were in vehicles. On the northern side of Airport road, multiple office buildings were unroofed. Nearby, Crestwood Hospital sustained minor damage. On the southern side of the road, a school had the north wall of its gymnasium blown out.

The tornado struck Garth Mountain, where it damaged multiple trees. As the tornado moved down the mountain, at 4:36 p.m. CST, it destroyed the Jones Valley Elementary School. The children within the school took shelter under the stairwell of the school. The roar of the tornado at the school was described as “multiple freight trains”. Next to the school were multiple snapped trees. A woman nearby was killed when driving to the school. The tornado crossed Garth Road, where it impacted numerous homes.

The tornado went up Huntsville Mountain, where the tornado moved into increasingly rural areas. The tornado hit the mountain’s peak before heading back down the mountain. After the mountain, it crossed U.S. Highway 431. After the highway, it went up Chestnut Knob, later crossing U.S. Highway 72. The tornado moved 1 mile (1.6 kilometers) southeast of Brownsboro, where it struck a small lake, where it dissipated at 4:50 p.m. CST.

== Aftermath ==
=== Casualties ===
21 people were killed, over half of them in automobiles. 463 people were injured.

List of confirmed fatalities
Name	Age	Location of death	Refs.
Ola Dowan Wilbanks	86	Automobile	
Della Mae Broad Buford	68	Mobile home	
Mary Elizabeth Matheny	67	Apartment	
Louise McCord	61	Commercial building	
Melba Sweeten	52	Apartment	
Wanda Lewis	50	Commercial building	
Rosa Burke Johnson	49	Automobile	
Karen E. Jones	48	Automobile	
John Lewis	47	Commercial building	
Allen Dale Cruse	46	Automobile	
Larry F. Ammerman	46	Automobile	
James Russel Black	45	Automobile	
Unknown Female	40	Automobile	
Scott Kraselsky	36	Automobile	
Thomas P. Fry (Note: The sources above have conflicting information on the age of Thomas Fry.)	33	Commercial Building	
James Shummerour	30	Automobile	
Audrey L. Hurford	25	Apartment	
Karen D. Luker	23	Automobile	
Vanessa HastingsPool	22	Apartment	
Godwin Yee Chen	7	Automobile	
Jennifer Luker	2	Automobile	

=== Damage ===
259 homes were completely destroyed, an additional 148 homes sustained minor damage. 130 homes sustained “major damage”. 80 businesses were destroyed, with only 8 other businesses sustaining minor damage. 3 churches were destroyed. Two schools were destroyed. Public utility damage was up to 1,900,000 (1989 USD). Pavement from the Jones Valley School impacted homes. A 40 pound (18.1 kilogram) piece of marble had been thrown into one home. A 8,000 pound (3,629 kilogram) mobile home had been flipped over next to a home. Clocks at Jones Valley School had stopped at 4:38 p.m. One desk from the school had been impaled by a magnolia tree. 30,000 people were left without power. Multiple stores at the Westbury Mall were swept off of their foundations. Alongside the mall, six two-story apartments were swept off of their foundations, although having no bolting system. Two garbage bins were found atop a tree stump. 42 high tension towers were toppled in a 2.5 mile (4 kilometer) stretch between Memorial Parkway and Huntsville Mountain.

=== Recovery efforts ===
Numerous people were trapped in cars and buildings. Rescue teams were expected to use flood lights and cranes to search for the injured. Doctors had difficulty reaching the hospital due to blocked roads. Over 700 United States Army soldiers were deployed in Huntsville to help with emergency operations. The then vice president’s wife, Marilyn Quayle, visited Huntsville in the days following the tornado. A memorial was constructed on Airport road to commemorate people who died in the tornado. The injured were carried to hospitals on doors. Numerous financial donations and blood donations were given. Food and clothes were also handed out. The American Red Cross asked the public for monetary donations due to spending $94,000,000 (1989 USD) to aid in the response of Hurricane Hugo and the 1989 Loma Prieta earthquake. Numerous people let others use their homes as shelter. By November 17, a disaster declaration, sent by former governor H. Guy Hunt was approved by the United States government. “A few hundred” people were without power by the 17th. A disaster relief center was set to open on November 19.

== See also ==
- 1979 Wichita Falls tornado - Also killed multiple people in vehicles a decade prior.
- 1995 Anderson Hills tornado - Another F4 tornado in the Huntsville area.
- 1989 Coldenham tornado - A tornado that killed multiple people a day after.
- List of Storm Prediction Center high risk days
