= List of New Jersey tornadoes =

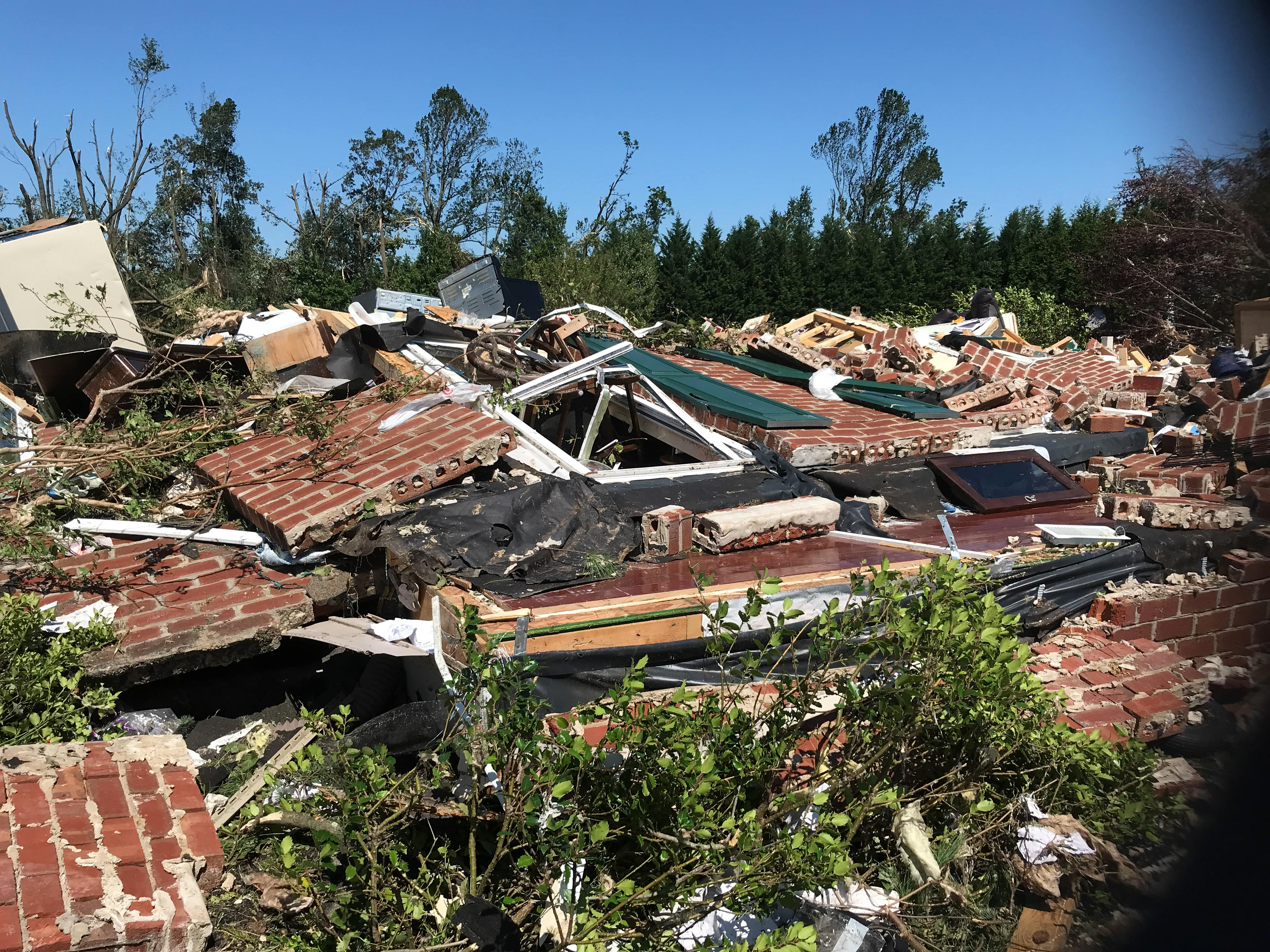
EF3 damage to a home in Mullica Hill

There have been at least 186 confirmed tornadoes in the U.S. state of New Jersey since 1950. On average, there are three tornadoes each year in the state, although there have been as many seven on a single day, which occurred both in 1989 and 2023. They have occurred in every month but December and January. The state's most active year was 1989, with 19 confirmed tornadoes. Most tornadoes in New Jersey have been weak and short-lived. However, an F2 tornado in 1958 crossed 48.5 mi (78.1 km) of the southern portion of the state, the longest tracked event on record. It touched down in Camden County and ended in Ocean County. Ranked in intensity using the Fujita scale or Enhanced Fujita scale, there have been five F3 or EF3 tornadoes in the state since 1950, most recently in 2021. There have been at least three deadly tornadoes on record in the state, resulting in a collective 7 fatalities. A tornado in 1835 hit New Brunswick, killing five people. On August 25, 1941, a tornado in Gloucester County killed a person. In 2003, a tornado in Burlington County flung a tree limb onto three cars, killing one person.

== Climatology ==
Each year, three tornadoes on average touch down in New Jersey, most of them weak and short-lived. There were 19 confirmed tornadoes in 1989, the most in a year since the start of recordkeeping in the National Centers for Environmental Information. Several years, most recently in 2018, had no recorded tornadoes in the state. There is a possible undercount in unpopulated areas in South Jersey, including around the New Jersey Pine Barrens and in Salem and Cumberland counties.

== Tornadoes ==
=== Pre-1900 ===
- July 13, 1783
- July 24, 1803
- May 22, 1804 – A small tornado touched down in Flemington in Hunterdon County, which killed a person due to a falling tree. This marked the earliest recorded death in the state from a tornado. The tornado also touched down in Somerset and Middlesex counties.
- June 19, 1835 – A tornado in New Brunswick killed five people.
- April 26, 1842
- August 22, 1843
- October 4, 1849 – Upper Township, Cape May County
- July 5, 1850
- May 13, 1867
- July 29, 1875
- August 17, 1876 – Dyers Creek, Cape May County
- November 2, 1877
- July 4, 1881 – Petersburg, Cape May County
- August 3, 1885
- June 30, 1892
- July 1, 1892 – Gloucester County tornado
- May 28, 1896 (part of a larger tornado outbreak sequence)
- August 1, 1899 – Union County tornado

=== 1900s ===
- March 27, 1911
- April 1, 1929
- August 15, 1941
- August 25, 1941 – An F2 tornado in Gloucester County killed a person.
- August 16, 1955 – An F2 or stronger tornado touched down in Monmouth County.
- October 16, 1955
- May 6, 1956 – A short lived tornado touched down in a wooded area near Woodbine just after midnight. It caused approximately $25,000 in property damage.
- June 13, 1958 – There were three tornadoes in the state. An F2 tornado touched down in near Maple Shade in Camden County. It moved east across the state, until it eventually reached Barnegat Bay, where it became a waterspout. It crossed the bay and dissipated near Lavallette in Ocean County. Its 48.5 mi (78.1 km) path made it the longest tracked tornado on record in the state. Its width was about 60 ft (18 m).
- July 14, 1960 – A tornado touched down near Carneys Point Township, lifted and touched back down. The tornado intensified as it crossed into Gloucester County, causing damage in Barnsboro and Sewell. A large barn was destroyed. Chicken houses and outbuildings were also destroyed. Homes suffered damage, especially to their roofs. The tornado spent most of its life in Gloucester County and dissipated in Sewell.
- May 24, 1962
- July 15, 1970 – Bergen County
- November 4, 1970 – Atlantic County
- July 19, 1971 – An F1 tornado formed near Rutherford and moved east into East Rutherford. The roof of a warehouse was torn off, and a garage was demolished. Trees were uprooted and other forms of considerable damage occurred along its 2 mi (3.2 km) long path.
- August 27, 1971 – As Tropical Storm Doria moved through the East Coast after making landfall near Morehead City, North Carolina, it spawned a waterspout around 1 a.m. off the coast of Cape May that came onshore. Numerous homes in Cape May suffered severe damage to their roofs. It continued northward over the Cape May Airport. An electrical substation along the path was severely damaged. It crossed the Tuckahoe River into Atlantic County, where no more damage was reported. There was consistent and extensive tree damage as it crossed the county. The tornado was on the ground for 28.7 mi (46 km), making it one of the longest tracked tornadoes in the state. The tornado was rated an F2, and Doria went on to cause record-breaking flooding across the state.
- February 2, 1973 – Storms brought an unseasonal three short-lived tornadoes to Hunterdon County. One was rated an F2, while the other two were rated an F1. The first tornado touched down in a corn field near Tewksbury Township, demolishing a barn and tearing a limb off of a tree. Another tornado formed east of Lebanon Township, damaging fences and vehicles. The final tornado touched down northwest of Califon, where it downed trees, unroofed a garage, and "exploded a wooden spring house". No injuries or fatalities were reported by these tornadoes.
- May 28, 1973 – Two F3 tornadoes struck Morris County. A dozen homes were destroyed and 12 people were injured in Flanders. It was rated an F3.
- April 14, 1974 – A squall line passing through the northern and central portions of the state triggered a short-lived tornado. Two brick homes in Lebanon Township were destroyed and a vehicle was destroyed by a falling roof. The tornado was rated an F2 and was on the ground for only 0.5 mi (1 km).
- July 24, 1974 – Ocean County
- July 13, 1975 – Two tornadoes touched down across New Jersey, one in Cumberland County, and one in Bergen County. The first tornado touched down at around 6 a.m. near Seabrook, where a school suffered severe roof damage. A frozen food packaging plant in Seabrook was also severely damaged. Multiple residences were damaged, but the extent of the damage is unknown. The estimated property damage was $10,000,000, or equivalent to $59,800,000 in 2025. The tornado in Bergen County touched down at around 9:26 a.m., where the majority of the damage was trees being uprooted, with the exception of a senior citizens home that was damaged. Both tornadoes were rated an F2.
- October 26, 1981 – An F2 tornado touched down near Vienna in Warren County, downing hundreds of trees and utility poles. A barn and silo was destroyed, and two vehicles were destroyed. The tornado reached a maximum width of 400 yd (366 m).
- June 29, 1982 – A tornado touched down in the afternoon near Berkeley Township in Ocean County, where it hit two retirement villages. Over 100 homes were damaged, 40 of which were damaged significantly. Flag poles were bent, and power lines were downed. Numerous vehicles were damaged, including four being totaled. No injuries or fatalities were reported by this tornado. The tornado was rated an F2.
- July 21, 1983 – In Ocean County, an F3 tornado that caused no fatalities or injuries.
- July 21, 1987 – An F2 tornado caused intermittent damage in Linwood, where trees were uprooted and snapped, as well as a brick wall being blown out. Three people were injured.
- July 26, 1987 – Two tornadoes formed in the morning, in the northern portion of the state. The first tornado touched down at 10 a.m. near Blairstown in Warren County, where large trees and power lines were downed. At the Blairstown Airport, a gust of 90 mph (145 km/h) was measured by an anemometer before it broke. It was associated with the tornado. Two aircraft at the airport were damaged. The tornado was rated an F0. The other tornado touched down in Union County, near the borough of Mountainside. Homes and vehicles suffered extensive damage, as well as fallen trees and power lines. This tornado was rated an F1.
- August 5, 1987 – A tornado touched down near Richland, downing trees and power lines. A trailer at the Buena Vista Campground in Buena Vista Township was overturned. Some trees were damaged. The tornado was rated an F0.
- July 20, 1988 – An F1 tornado touched down in Pedricktown in Salem County. The tornado was on the ground for 0.2 mi (0.32 km). Damage was estimated to be at $75,000 to $100,000.
- July 23, 1988 – An F1 tornado briefly touched down in Upper Deerfield Township in Cumberland County during the night. The tornado was on the ground for 0.1 mi (0.16 km). 1 person was injured.
- August 17, 1988 – A cold front spawned three tornadoes in the state, one in Hunterdon County, one in Salem County, and one in Ocean County. The first tornado was an F2 that touched down in Ewing Township, near the Trenton–Mercer Airport. It remained on the ground for 4.5 mi (7.24 km), bringing down trees, power lines, and damaging buildings. Damage was estimated at $2.5 million. An F2 tornado touched down in Carneys Point Township in Salem County, uprooting large diameter trees that fell on automobiles, with the exception of one tree falling on a house. The tornado was on the ground for 1.5 mi (2.41 km), and reached a maximum width of 400 yd (366 m). An F0 tornado briefly touched down in Lakewood Township, uprooting trees along its 0.2 mi (0.32 km) path. Additionally, 14 people were injured when a circus tent in Lavallette was blown down due to the strong winds.
- March 18, 1989 – Three F1 tornadoes touched down across Gloucester County. The first tornado touched down near the Cedar Grove area of South Harrison Township, where two barns were damaged, causing about $15,000 in damage. The second tornado touched down southeast of Jefferson, overturning a shed and causing extensive tree damage, before lifting and touching back down near Sewell, where a farm was damaged. The last tornado affected the borough of Wenonah, where extensive tree damage continued. A large tree destroyed a house after falling on it.
- July 10, 1989 – Northeastern United States tornado outbreak. Two F0s and an F1 tracked through parts of Passaic County, New Jersey and Bergen County, New Jersey, snapping and uprooting trees, and causing $4 million in damage. About 150 houses damaged in Bergen County alone.
- November 15, 1989 – Part of a larger tornado outbreak, there were seven tornadoes across the state, setting a record for most events in a single day that was later tied in 2023.
- November 20, 1989 – A few days following the tornado outbreak, a tornado touched down near Seaside Park, unroofing a building and also causing considerable damage to the second floor. The windows of a vehicle were blown out. The tornado was rated an F0.
- May 10, 1990 – Two tornadoes touched down in Cumberland County, the first of which touched down near Deerfield Township, specifically in the Carmel area, uprooting and throwing hundreds of trees. A wind gust of 76 mph (122 km/h) was reported in Carmel. The tornado would lift and spawn an F2 tornado in Vineland shortly afterwards. The tornado would blow out a concrete wall, and then hit an automobile dealership, where windows in both the building and the cars were blown out. People inside the dealership suffered minor injuries from flying glass, but the exact number is unknown.
- October 18, 1990 – An F3 tornado touched down in Montgomery Township. Three homes were destroyed and 8 people were injured.
- June 24, 1992 – Washington Township, Morris County tornado
- August 21, 1993 – An F2 tornado touched down just near Hammonton in Atlantic County in the evening. It touched down and moved across Hammonton Lake, becoming a waterspout. There was extensive tree damage along the tornado's 1.5 mi (2.41 km) path, as well as houses and outbuildings being damaged. A wooden shed and boat dock were destroyed by the tornado. Damage was estimated to be about $500,000.
- July 3, 1994 – An F1 tornado touched down in Blackwood, located in Camden County. The tornado mostly damaged trees, but the greatest impact was at a daycare center, where most of the roof was lifted off. Fortunately, nobody was inside the center at the time. The tornado was on the ground for 6 minutes, remaining on the ground for 1 mi (1.6 km). The tornado also hit a supermarket, blowing down trailers and damaging the roof's ventilation system. No injuries or fatalities were reported in this tornado.
- August 2, 1994 – The merger of thunderstorm spawned a rare westward-moving tornado in Chesterfield Township in Burlington County. The F1 tornado destroyed a barn and damaged a roof.
- August 17, 1994 – The remnants of Tropical Storm Beryl produced a tornado outbreak across the eastern United States, including an F1 that touched down in Hunterdon County near Readington Township. It remained on the ground for about 1 mi (1.6 km), lifted for about 5 mi (8.0 km), then touched down again briefly.
- November 1, 1994 – A brief F0 tornado hit Loch Arbour in Monmouth County, damaging 13 houses at the cost of about $75,000. It also uprooted about a dozen trees.
- May 29, 1995 – A thunderstorm spawned a tornado in Chesterfield Township in Burlington County, which previously produced a tornado in Norristown, Pennsylvania, as well as a funnel cloud over the Burlington Bristol Bridge. The Chesterfield tornado damaged four houses, and knocked down several trees.
- July 16, 1995 – Two tornadoes struck down in the state, in Cape May County and Cumberland County.
- July 22, 1995 – A severe thunderstorm spawned a brief F0 tornado in Deptford Township in Gloucester County, damaging several homes and knocking down trees, which blocked a portion of Route 47 for a few hours.
- October 21, 1995 – An F0 briefly touched down in Forked River in Ocean County, uprooting several trees and destroying the roof of a house.
- June 22, 1996 – An F0 touched down for 2 mi (3.2 km) in the south side of Trenton into Hamilton Township. The tornado damaged the roof of an apartment building, displacing 30 people. About 16,000 people lost power related to the event.
- September 8, 1996 – An F0 tornado touched down in East Brunswick. It struck three nearby buildings, leaving 45 families homeless. The tornado was on the ground for 0.1 mi (0.16 km).
- August 13, 1997 – An F0 tornado touched down in Middletown Township in Monmouth County, which remained on the ground for 1.2 mi (1.9 km) before becoming a waterspout in Sandy Hook Bay. With estimated wind gusts of 70 mph (110 km/h), the tornado knocked down several trees, including one that crushed three cars, one that fell onto a powerline and burned a car, and one that damaged a porch.
- September 11, 1997 – A thunderstorm ahead of a cold front produced an F1 tornado in West Milford in Passaic County, which was only on the ground for about 30 seconds, and about 0.3 mi (0.48 km). It knocked down about 150 trees, two of which fell onto houses, and four of which fell onto cars.
- September 2, 1998 – A line of thunderstorms spawned an F0 tornado in East Greenwich Township in Gloucester County, which downed a few trees, some of which fell onto homes. The tornado was on the ground for about 0.3 mi (0.48 km) before lifting.
- September 7, 1998 – A line of thunderstorms ahead of a cold front spawned two tornadoes in Union County. An F0 was on the ground for 0.2 mi (0.32 km) in a populated section of Plainfield. The tornado knocked down 95 trees and caused $1.5 million in damage. The other tornado, rated an F1, touched down in Clark, with estimated winds of 110 mph (180 km/h). The tornado knocked down at least 150 trees along its 0.2 mi (0.32 km) path, causing $550,000 in damage.
- February 12, 1999 – An unseasonably warm air mass, in conjunction with a cold front, produced a line of thunderstorms that spawned an F1 tornado in Cherry Hill in Camden County. It damaged 13 homes, one of them severely, and a porch was destroyed. The tornado was only on the ground briefly, with a path of 0.5 mi (0.80 km) and a width of 120 ft (37 m). Damage was estimated at $100,000.
- August 20, 1999 – A waterspout moved across Long Beach Island in Ocean County, with a 0.4 mi (0.64 km) path and about 300 ft (91 m) wide. Wind gusts were estimated at 120 mph (190 km/h). The F2 tornado damaged about 35 buildings, including two homes and a motel that were condemned. Damage was estimated at $4.2 million. One person was injured by flying glass. The tornado knocked down two transmission lines, leaving about 3,100 buildings without power. Moving over water, the tornado became a waterspout again, sinking a boat in Little Egg Harbor before dissipating.

=== 2000–2009 ===
- May 27, 2001 – An F2 tornado touched down in Manalapan Township in Monmouth County, which caused about $1 million worth of damage. With a diameter of about 200 ft (61 m), the tornado knocked down dozens of trees, and rolled a car 40 ft (12 m). It was on the ground for 1.5 miles (2.4 km). Winds were estimated at 120 mph (190 km/h).
- July 5, 2001 – A waterspout that formed over Patcong Creek moved across Somers Point in Atlantic County, becoming an F1 tornado with a diameter of 300 ft (91 m). It crossed the Garden State Parkway and later moved into Linwood. The tornado damaged six homes, left 400 people without power, and bent about 30 trees. Winds were estimated at 90 mph (140 km/h). The tornado was on the ground intermittently for 3.1 mi (5.0 km), until dissipating as a waterspout over Scull Bay. Damage was estimated at $15,000.
- July 3, 2003 – An F0 tornado touched down briefly in Goshen in Cape May County, associated with the remnants of Tropical Storm Bill. The tornado was on the ground for 317 ft (97 m), with a width of about 100 ft (30 m).
- September 23, 2003 – Three tornadoes struck the state that day, one each in Hunterdon County, Mercer County, and Burlington County. The first was an F1 in Delaware Township in Hunterdon County, and was on the ground for 2.6 mi (4.2 km). Strong winds, estimated at 75 mph (120 km/h), knocked down trees and power lines. Around a dozen properties, including a farm, were damaged. An F1 touched down in Florence Township in Burlington County, resulting in a local state of emergency after causing $2.1 million in damage. A third F1 tornado touched down in Trenton and continued into Lawrence Township. The tornado incurred about $1 million in damage, after its strong winds knocked down many trees, injuring two people. Downed power lines trapped a school bus. More than 50,000 people lost power in the state that day from the storms.
- October 27, 2003 – A strong cold front spawned three F0 tornados in the state. One touched down in Bedminster Township in Somerset County. It knocked down a few trees while it was briefly on the ground. Another touched down in Hainesport Township in Burlington County, the first recorded tornado in Burlington County since 1994. With estimated winds of 70 mph (110 km/h), the tornado flung a tree limb onto three cars, killing one person, making it the first deadly tornado in the state since 1941. It was on the ground for about 0.5 mi (0.80 km) and had a width of 90 ft (27 m). The last tornado of the day touched down along the Raritan River near Highland Park in Middlesex County. Only on the ground briefly, the tornado damaged a boat and a few trees.
- July 27, 2004 – A high end F1 tornado touched down in Pemberton Township and continued into Woodland Township in Burlington County. A roof was peeled off and the top floor of a building was damaged at the New Lisbon Developmental Center. Two workers in separate vans received minor injuries when one van was overturned and the other hit by a tree branch.
- September 28, 2004 – The remnants of Hurricane Jeanne spawned an F0 tornado in Cherry Hill in Camden County, and was on the ground for 2.5 mi (4.0 km). Moving through a shopping center, the tornado damaged 13 buildings and several cars, with monetary damage estimated at $100,000.
- June 2, 2006 – An EF0 tornado formed from the merger of two thunderstorm cells in East Greenwich Township in Gloucester County, with winds estimated at 65 mph (105 km/h). Fallen trees damaged 23 houses.
- July 29, 2009 – An EF2 tornado touched down near Wantage Township in Sussex County, downing numerous trees, partially collapsing two barns and damaging several others.

=== 2010–2019 ===
- September 16, 2010 – An EF1 tornado touched down in Plumsted Township, causing roof damage to two homes and downing numerous trees.
- August 9, 2011 – A brief EF0 tornado touched down in Millstone Township, and dissipated shortly after. No damage was reported.
- August 28, 2011 – Hurricane Irene spawned an EF0 tornado near Robbinsville in Mercer County. Numerous trees were knocked down, and several electric poles were damaged.
- September 4, 2012 – The remnants of Hurricane Isaac produced an EF0 in Mount Ephraim, only being on the ground for less than a minute. The tornado uprooted trees, downed power lines and damaged the roofs of several homes.
- July 1, 2013 – An EF0 tornado touched down in Berkeley Heights near the Passaic River just west of Garfield Street, passed northeast through New Providence and dissipated in Summit near Evergreen Road. The tornado caused extensive tree damage.
- August 13, 2013 – An EF0 tornado touched down in Manahawkin, snapping trees, downing power lines and damaging several church buildings.
- October 7, 2013 – An EF1 tornado touched down near the town of Paramus, moving northeast across Bergen County. The tornado damaged a cemetery and a golf course, and snapped and uprooted trees.
- July 14, 2016 – An EF0 tornado touched down near White Township in Warren County and moved along a path nearly 3 miles long, damaging a barn and a home, and shearing the tops of trees.
- July 25, 2016 – An EF1 tornado touched down in Readington Township in Hunterdon County and then moved east towards Somerset County. The tornado (thought at first to be a microburst) broke several utility poles, threw vehicles up to 100 feet in the air, and downed trees and power lines. It later moved into Branchburg.
- June 24, 2017 – The remnants of Tropical Storm Cindy spawned two EF0 tornadoes within six minutes of each other in Howell Township in Monmouth County. The first touched down in a Home Depot parking lot, and damaged two buildings and several trees. The tornado was on the ground for two minutes, with a length of 0.5 mi (0.80 km) and a width of 120 ft (37 m). The other tornado moved through Oak Glen Park, uprooting numerous hardwood trees before dissipating.
- May 28, 2019 – An EF1 tornado touched down in Stanhope and damaged the Lenape Valley Regional High school. Several trees were snapped or uprooted in this area. A small but anchored outbuilding was also lifted and flipped over. Further tree damage occurred at a residence across the street from the school. Damage then appeared to briefly abate, indicating the tornado likely lifted for a short time. However, a short distance further southeast, additional tornadic damage was observed with numerous trees snapped or uprooted and several homes and cars sustaining damage from falling trees on and around Unger Avenue. The tornado dissipated shortly afterwards.
- June 13, 2019 – A warm front spawned a line of thunderstorms, which spawned an EF0 tornado near Mullica Hill in Gloucester County; it damaged two properties while it was briefly on the ground. The same line of thunderstorm spawned an EF1 tornado in Deptford Township, also in Gloucester County, which stayed on the ground intermittently for 1.5 mi (2.4 km), before lifting in Gloucester Township in Camden County. The tornado damaged four properties and uprooted several trees. It had a width of 600 ft (180 m).
- July 6, 2019 – A landspout briefly touched down as an EF0 tornado in Mount Laurel. It overturned a car before passing over a warehouse, causing minor roof damage.
- July 11, 2019 – An EF1 tornado touched down in an open area on a golf course in Mount Laurel, travelling discontinuously for more than a mile, snapping and uprooting numerous trees, and damaging several apartment buildings before dissipating.
- August 7, 2019 – A cold front spawned three tornadoes in the state. An EF0 touched down in Springfield Township in Union County, downing power lines, busting solar panels and damaging dozens of vehicles at a dealership. A rooftop air conditioning unit collapsed onto a sedan, and a section of the dealership's warehouse roof was torn wide open. An EF0 briefly touched down in Hightstown, which shattered the glass roof of a greenhouse. Flying glass injured a woman. The tornado was on the ground for 0.33 mi (0.53 km), with a width of 75 ft (23 m). The third was an EF0 in Millville in Cumberland County. It touched down briefly in a field of solar panels near the Millville City Sewer Department Facility, destroying several rows of panels. The tornado then moved into a wooded area, snapping at least one tree and damaging several others.
- October 31, 2019 – A squall line spawned an EF1 tornado in Harding Township in Morris County. It knocked down several trees and power lines, some of which fell onto houses. The tornado was on the ground intermittently for 4.87 mi (7.84 km) for five minutes, with a width of 450 ft (140 m).

=== 2020–present ===
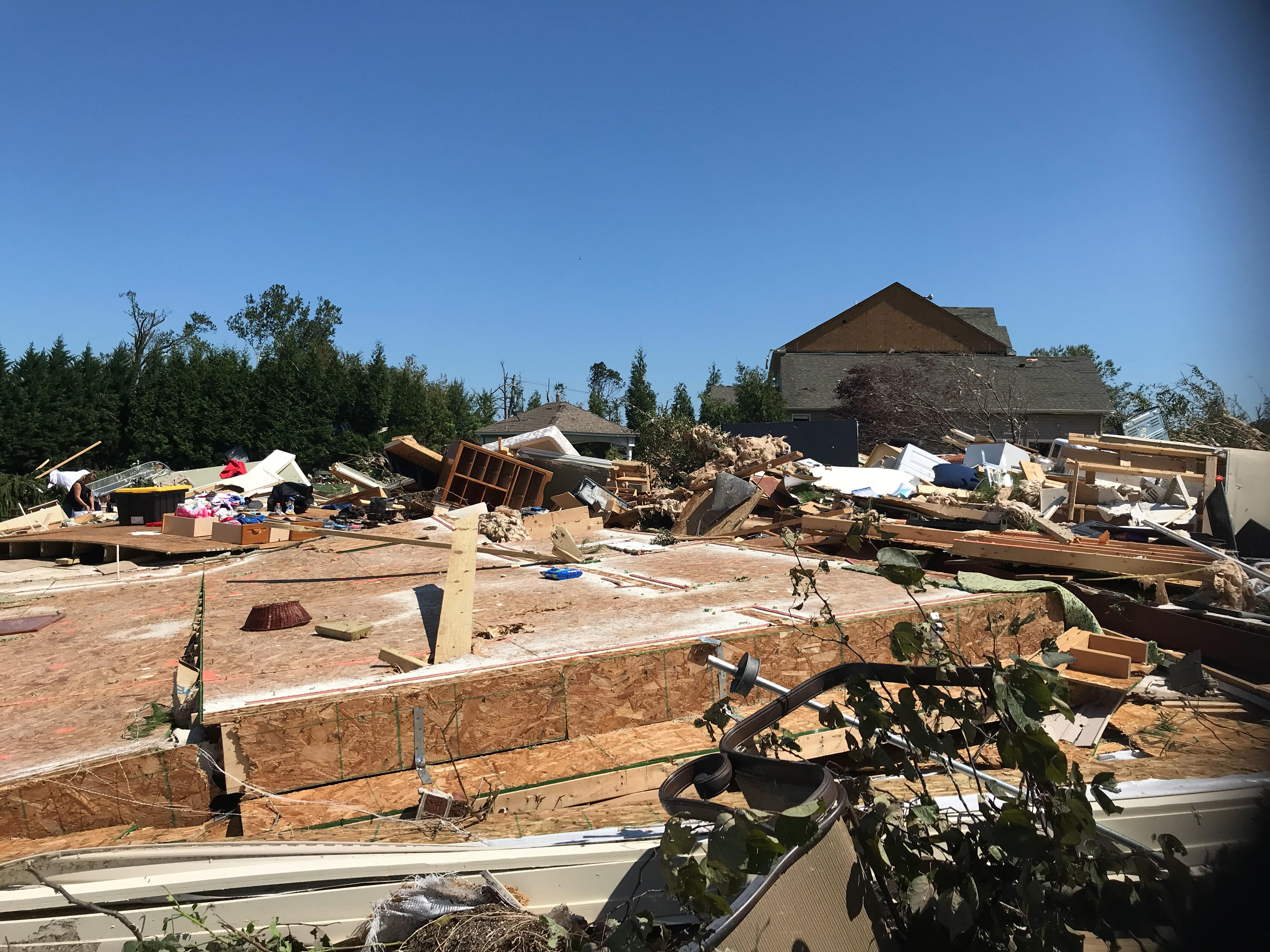
Damage from EF3 tornado in Mullica Hill in September 2021

- April 21, 2020 – A waterspout formed over Barnegat Bay between Silver Bay and Kettle Creek, then moved ashore in Normandy Beach as an EF0 tornado. Several boats and associated trailers were tossed and flipped, and one house was damaged. The tornado then became a waterspout as it emerged over the coastal waters, causing little or no additional damage.
- August 4, 2020 – Tropical Storm Isaias moved through the state and spawned two tornadoes. The first was a waterspout that came ashore near the end of Corson's Inlet State Park near Strathmere in Cape May County. After moving through marshy areas, the EF1 tornado crossed the Garden State Parkway, and proceeded to damage several homes, as well as a Coca Cola facility, in Marmora. It was on the ground for 4.24 mi (6.82 km), with a width of 450 ft (140 m). Another waterspout developed in Manahawkin Bay between Ship Bottom and Brant Beach, which moved northwestward, crossing the Route 72 bridge. The tornado tracked right over the Long Beach Island Weatherflow weather station located north of Egg Island and west of Flat Island in Manahawkin Bay, which measured a 109 mph (175 km/h) wind gust, indicating it was an EF1 tornado. The tornado lifted shortly thereafter.
- August 19, 2020 – An EF0 tornado touched down in an athletic field on the campus of Brookdale Community College in the Lincroft section of Middletown, which damaged a few trees.
- July 9, 2021 – Tropical Storm Elsa moved along the New Jersey coast, and it spawned two tornadoes in the state that day. An EF1 tornado touched down in Woodbine in Cape May County, which was on the ground for 0.94 mi (1.51 km). It destroyed the picnic shelter of a condonminium complex, and knocked down several trees, one into a house. In Little Egg Harbor in Ocean County, an EF0 tornado downed a few trees or limbs and damaged a few homes.
- July 17, 2021 – An EF1 tornado touched down in Mansfield Township in Burlington County just east of the Route 206 and Columbus-Jobstown road intersection. A narrow, discontinuous, path of tree damage spanned for 7.9 miles (12.7 km) and significant tree damage was observed. Additionally, numerous tree limbs were blown on powerlines on Monmouth Road near Tilghmans Corner. Afterwards, the tornado dissipated before the Ocean County line.
- July 29, 2021 – As part of a larger tornado outbreak, a warm front spawned six tornadoes in the state that day. A short-lived EF0 tornado touched down in Verona inside the Montclair Golf Club, which downed a few trees, one of which fell onto a home. An EF2 tornado began in New Hope, Pennsylvania, which crossed the Delaware River and entered Mercer County, New Jersey near Washington Crossing; it knocked down hundreds of trees before lifting near Trenton Mercer Airport. An EF1 touched down on Route 130 south of Windsor near the Assunpink Creek, which damaged trees and one building. Another EF1 tornado touched down in a heavily forested area in eastern Woodland Township, which knocked down several trees and limbs along its path. An EF0 tornado touched down Jackson Township, damaging several trees near Success Lake. The same thunderstorm produced a tornado that touched down on the western coast of Barnegat Bay, which crossed the bay and struck Barnegat Light as an EF2; there, it damaged several houses and boats.
- August 19, 2021 – The remnants of Tropical Storm Fred spawned an EF0 tornado in Rockaway Township in Morris County. It knocked down a few trees and branches, before crossing Interstate 80 and lifting.
- September 1, 2021 – The remnants of Hurricane Ida spawned three tornadoes. An EF3 tornado touched down near Harrisonville in Gloucester County, which caused widespread damage in and around the Mullica Hill area and damage to trees and houses in Wenonah. It was on the ground for 12.6 mi (20.3 km), with a maximum width of 1,200 ft (370 m), and estimated winds of 150 mph (240 km/h) before dissipating over Deptford. The same supercell produced an EF1 tornado in Burlington in Burlington County, which knocked down at least 30 trees, one of which fell onto a car. The tornado crossed the Delaware River and lifted in Bristol, Pennsylvania. The supercell later produced an EF0 tornado in Princeton, New Jersey, which downed a few trees in a parking lot.
- May 20, 2022 – An EF0 tornado formed in Monmouth County just after 5 PM along Line Road on the borders of Aberdeen and Hazlet before continuing easterly into a residential neighborhood between Sophia Drive and Carlow Way. Its estimated peak winds were 85 mph (137 km/h) with a path length of 0.8 mi (1.3 km) and a maximum width of 675 ft (206 m). It was on the ground for approximately one minute. One home sustained structural damage after a tree fell onto its roof, and other houses lost siding, roof shingles or gutters. Fences, utility poles, and power lines were also damaged. The tornado dissipated several blocks after crossing the Garden State Parkway.
- June 9, 2022 – An EF1 tornado occurred in Blackwood at 4:59 AM, lasting approximately two minutes, damaging multiple homes and uprooting at least three trees. Its estimated peak winds were 90 mph (140 km/h) with a path length of 0.26 mi (0.42 km) and a maximum width of 180 ft (55 m).
- February 21, 2023 – An EF2 tornado touched down near Lawrence Township, which damaged trees and roofs along its 5.8 mi (9.3 km) path.

Radar loop from Mount Holly, NJ National Weather Service on April 1, 2023

- April 1, 2023: A strong cold front spawned seven tornadoes across the state, tying the November 1989 tornado outbreak for the most New Jersey tornado in a single day. These included three EF2 tornadoes, the first of which touched down in Jackson Township; it snapped dozens of trees and wrecked a newly-built warehouse. Another EF2 hit the same township just six minutes after the previous one dissipated, which was strong enough to destroy a roof. In Sea Girt, an EF2 tornado lifted a roof and moved it 750 ft (230 m). There were also EF1 tornadoes in Cinnaminson, Crosswicks, Allentown, and Mays Landing.
- June 16, 2023 – An EF0 tornado caused tree damage in Pemberton Township in Burlington County.
- June 26, 2023 – An EF0 tornado in Bernardsville in Somerset County knocked trees onto a train line.
- August 7, 2023 – An EF0 tornado in Holland Township in Hunterdon developed along a cold front, which damaged trees as well as two farm buildings.
- August 10, 2023 – There were two EF1 tornadoes in the state. The first touched down in East Greenwich Township in Gloucester County, which blew off the roof of a camper. The other hit the Browns Mills section of Pemberton Township in Burlington County, which lifted a shed several feet off the ground.
- June 14, 2024 – An EF0 landspout touched down in Lawrence Township in Mercer County, which flipped over a few vehicles.
- May 16, 2025 – An EF1 tornado was on the ground for about a minute in Collings Lakes in Atlantic County. It knocked down tree branches, including one that fell onto a home.
- July 22, 2025 – A waterspout moved ashore Island Beach State Park.
- July 21, 2026 – Four tornadoes touched down in the state, out of which three were EF-1 tornadoes. The first touched down in Parsippany–Troy Hills in Morris County, leaving about 1,000 people without power. A tornado touched down on the border of Stanhope and Mount Olive, and knocked down trees along U.S. 206. Another hit Pine Brook causing mostly tree damage. A waterspout moved ashore Cape May Point, which became a brief EF0 tornado that damaged a few trees.
- August 20, 2026 – A tornado briefly touched down in a wooded area southeast of Estell Manor, but caused no damage.
- November 12, 2026 - A confirmed tornado touched down in Bordentown, New Jersey at around 4PM.

== See also ==
- List of New Jersey hurricanes
- List of New York tornadoes
