= 1835 Middlesex County tornado =

1835 tornado in New Jersey, US

Meteorological history
- Formed: June 19, 1835

FU tornado
- on the Fujita scale

Overall effects
- Fatalities: 5
- Damage: $300,000 (1835 USD)

The 1835 Middlesex County tornado was a deadly tornado that touched down in Middlesex County on June 19, 1835, becoming the deadliest tornado recorded in New Jersey's history. It destroyed all but two of twelve houses in Piscataway and killed five in New Brunswick, where it struck what is now part of downtown along a path through (or near) what is now Robert Wood Johnson University Hospital property, the site of Monument Square, and George Street.

== Reporting ==
About 5 o'clock yesterday afternoon, a tornado passed over the town of Piscataway, about two miles from New Brunswick, which destroyed every house but two. The current proceeded towards the City of New Brunswick, and made dreadful havoc in that place, destroying and damaging nearly one hundred and fifty houses in Liberty, Richmond and Schureman streets. The most melancholy part of the accident is the death of several persons. There were 5 deaths, and here are 4 of them. A widow lady by the name of Van Arsdale, a man called Henry Boorsem, formerly a midshipman in the Navy, who was killed in the street, and a boy named Bayard.

— New York Evening Star, June 20, 1835

== See also ==
- List of North American tornadoes and tornado outbreaks
- List of New Jersey tornadoes
- 1989 Northeastern United States tornado outbreak (produced three tornadoes in New Jersey)

Preceded by Charleston, SC (1761)	Costliest U.S. tornadoes on Record; June 19, 1835	Succeeded by Natchez, Miss. (1840)
