= November 1989 tornado outbreak =

Weather event in the United States and Canada

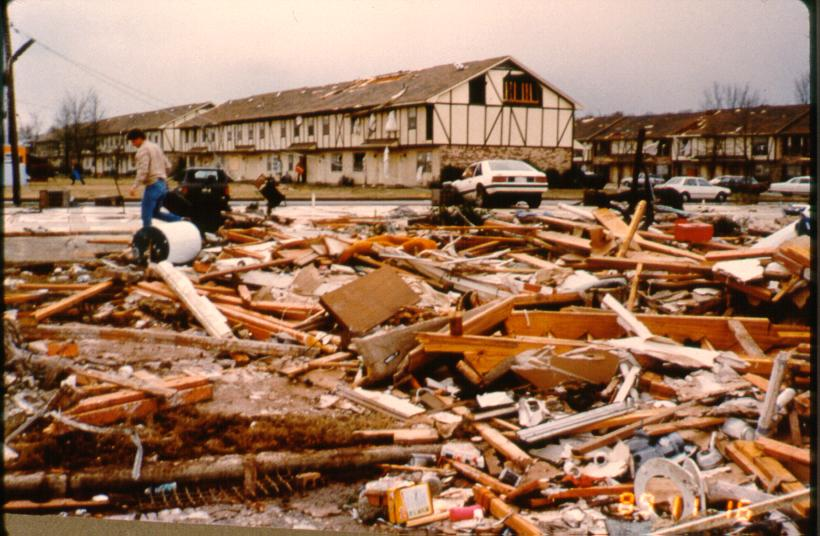
- Tornado damage in Huntsville, Alabama caused by an F4 tornado.

Meteorological history
- Duration: November 15-16, 1989

Tornado outbreak
- Tornadoes: 40
- Max. rating: F4 tornado
- Duration: 26 hours

Overall effects
- Fatalities: 30
- Injuries: 523
- Damage: $160 million (2005 USD)
- Areas affected: Southern and Eastern United States
- Part of the 'tornado outbreaks of 1989'

A destructive tornado outbreak struck a wide swath of the Southern and Eastern United States as well as Canada on November 15 and 16, 1989. It produced at least 40 tornadoes and caused 30 deaths as a result of two deadly tornadoes. The most devastating event was the Huntsville, Alabama F4 tornado, which killed 21 on the afternoon of November 15. Nine more fatalities occurred at a single elementary school by an F1 tornado on November 16 in Newburgh, New York, although further survey revealed that this might have been a downburst instead. This outbreak also produced the most tornadoes in a single day in New Jersey, later tied on April 1, 2023. Several other significant tornadoes were reported across 15 states.

== Meteorological synopsis ==
Historically, tornadoes are relatively common in north Alabama, where Huntsville and Madison County are located. The region was affected by the 1974 Super Outbreak, and records show that Madison County has had 25 tornadoes from 1950 through October 1989.

The Zone and Local Forecasts issued during the early morning, Tuesday, November 14, mentioned the possibility of severe thunderstorms on Wednesday. Subsequent forecasts and statements marked with increasing certainty the ominous nature of the events to come.

The National Severe Storms Forecast Center (NSSFC) issued a Public Severe Weather Outlook at 9:30 a.m. Wednesday and highlighted the unusually strong potential for severe thunderstorms and tornadoes over the Tennessee Valley. The Birmingham Forecast Office followed with a Special Weather Statement at 10:50 a.m. with the headline, "MAJOR SEVERE WEATHER THREAT POISED FOR ALABAMA AND NORTHWEST FLORIDA!".

A Tornado Watch was in effect for Madison and adjacent counties from 12:30 p.m. to 8:00 p.m. Soon after the issuance of the watch, emergency management officials, storm spotters and the NWS staff at Huntsville placed into effect a coordinated plan of action in accordance with established procedures. Beginning at 12:45 p.m., WSO Huntsville issued warnings for the west part of its county warning area as an intense squall line moved into northwest Alabama. Storm spotters reported large hail and intense straight-line wind associated with this squall line.

At the time the tornado struck Huntsville, a Severe Thunderstorm Warning was in effect for Madison County. That warning, issued at 4:13 p.m., was changed to a Tornado Warning at 4:35 p.m. based on a report relayed through the amateur radio spotter network of a tornado touchdown in the city. Critical weather information was disseminated over the NOAA Weather Wire Service (NWWS) and NWR and by many media outlets in Huntsville and adjacent areas providing the public with frequent weather updates on radio and "crawls" and live "cut-ins" on television. Links with spotter groups and emergency management and law enforcement officials worked well.

== Confirmed tornadoes ==
Confirmed tornadoes by Fujita rating
| FU | F0 | F1 | F2 | F3 | F4 | F5 | Total |
|---|---|---|---|---|---|---|---|
| 0 | 15 | 15 | 8 | 1 | 1 | 0 | 40 |

=== November 15 event ===
List of reported tornadoes – Wednesday, November 15, 1989 (Note: All dates are based on the local time zone where the tornado touched down; however, all times are in Coordinated Universal Time for consistency.)
| F# | Location | County / Parish | State | Time (UTC) | Path length | Max width | Summary |
|---|---|---|---|---|---|---|---|
| F0 | Lepanto | Poinsett | AR | 1730 | 0.25 mi (0.40 km) | 50 yd (46 m) | Most of the roof was removed from the gymnasium at Lepanto High School, and several homes sustained minor roof damage. |
| F1 | NW of Henning | Lauderdale | TN | 1830–1835 | 4 mi (6.4 km) | 75 yd (69 m) | Two homes were damaged and numerous sheds and outbuildings were destroyed. |
| F2 | Trenton | Gibson | TN | 1855–1901 | 5 mi (8.0 km) | 80 yd (73 m) | A few homes sustained roof damage, a patio was torn up, and numerous trees and several power lines were downed. |
| F1 | SE of Ashland | Clay | AL | 2020 | 0.5 mi (0.80 km) | 20 yd (18 m) | One house was destroyed in the Mellow Valley area, and the three occupants were injured. |
| F2 | NE of Greenwood | Greenwood | SC | 2034 | 0.75 mi (1.21 km) | 269 yd (246 m) | 47 homes were damaged in a subdivision, four of which were unroofed. One person was injured. |
| F2 | NNE of Ashley to S of Lexington | Morrow, Richland | OH | 2100–2127 | 23 mi (37 km) | 75 yd (69 m) | Many homes and barns were damaged, and numerous trees were downed in Morrow County. The tornado crossed into Richland County east of Shauck, taking a roof off a home and destroying a second home and a mobile home south of Lexington. |
| F1 | SW of Falmouth | Pendleton | KY | 2109 | 0.25 mi (0.40 km) | 200 yd (180 m) | Two mobile homes were destroyed, and the roof of an old school was ripped off in the community of Morgan. Two people were injured in one of the mobile homes. |
| F1 | Oliver | Screven | GA | 2145 | 1 mi (1.6 km) | 50 yd (46 m) | A mobile home was carried about 35 feet (11 m) from its foundation, with parts of it being blown up to 500 feet (150 m) away. Three houses sustained roof damage, and numerous trees were downed. The five occupants of the mobile home were injured. |
| F0 | De Kalb | Kemper | MS | 2150 | 5 mi (8.0 km) | 18 yd (16 m) | Two homes were destroyed. 15 other homes or barns were damaged. Several trees were downed. Listed as F2 by Grazulis. |
| F4 | Huntsville to NE of Brownsboro | Madison | AL | 2230–2250 | 18.5 mi (29.8 km) | 880 yd (800 m) | 21 deaths – See article on this tornado – 463 people were injured. |
| F0 | E of Roanoke | Randolph | AL | 2243 | 0.3 mi (0.48 km) | 20 yd (18 m) | Several mobile homes were damaged. |
| F1 | Stevenson | Jackson | AL | 2355 | 1 mi (1.6 km) | 20 yd (18 m) | Several mobile homes and vehicles were destroyed, a school roof was damaged, and large steel utility towers were twisted. |
| F2 | NW of Rome | Floyd | GA | 0005 | 8 mi (13 km) | 450 yd (410 m) | The tornado touched down near Coosa before moving across Simms Mountain and into Big Texas Valley. Many homes were damaged along the path, and numerous barns and outbuildings were either damaged or destroyed, along with multiple vehicles. In Big Texas Valley, one mobile home was overturned and another was heavily damaged. A large house about 200 yards (180 m) away from the second mobile home was demolished and six vehicles were destroyed. Many trees were downed along the path. One person sustained minor injuries. Caused $2,000,000 in damage. |
| F2 | SE of Palmetto | Coweta, Fulton | GA | 0025 | 4 mi (6.4 km) | 300 yd (270 m) | Several homes were damaged and a poolhouse sustained significant damage south of Palmetto. Two mobile home parks were damaged near the Coweta–Fulton county line. |
| F3 | W of Clarkesville to WSW of Tallulah Falls | Habersham | GA | 0030 | 8 mi (13 km) | 1,760 yd (1,610 m) | Six homes were destroyed, and six others were heavily damaged. Businesses were destroyed, and three mobile homes were flattened. Seventeen large chicken houses were destroyed at a poultry farm, killing 250,000 birds. Considerable damage occurred in the communities of Stonepile and New Liberty. Three people were injured. The tornado was up to 1 mile (1.6 km) wide and caused $1,000,000 in damage. |
| F2 | E of Palmetto | Coweta, Fulton | GA | 0045 | 7 mi (11 km) | 300 yd (270 m) | This tornado struck the same mobile home parks just impacted by the first Palmetto tornado, resulting in several injuries. In total, 72 trailers were either damaged or destroyed, and 50 site-built homes were damaged. Numerous vehicles were either damaged or destroyed, and a few businesses were damaged as well. Four tractor-trailers were flipped on Interstate 85, injuring the drivers. Another injury occurred when a car was rolled for 100 feet (30 m). A mobile news van was thrown 400 feet (120 m) by the tornado as well. At a truck stop, gas pumps were uprooted, spilling gas on the lots. Numerous trees were downed along the path. Fourteen people were injured in total. Caused $1,200,000 in damage. |
| F1 | S of Cleveland | Bradley | TN | 0045–0051 | 3 mi (4.8 km) | 30 yd (27 m) | An older unoccupied building was levelled, several outbuildings were destroyed, and a brick chimney on a house was destroyed. Numerous trees were downed. |

=== November 16 event ===
List of reported tornadoes – Thursday, November 16, 1989
| F# | Location | County / Parish | State | Time (UTC) | Path length | Max width | Summary |
|---|---|---|---|---|---|---|---|
| F2 | Summit Point to Charles Town | Jefferson | WV | 1000 | 9 mi (14 km) | 50 yd (46 m) | A house and several buildings at Summit Point sustained structural damage. A two-inch (5.1 cm) diameter tree limb was driven through a shingle roof with half-inch-thick plywood. Further along the path, outbuildings were demolished, roofs were torn off, a cinder-block garage sustained roof loss and collapsed walls, and a mobile home was rolled several times. Numerous trees were snapped or uprooted as well. Three people were injured inside the mobile home. |
| F0 | NW of Amelia Court House | Amelia | VA | 1315 | 0.25 mi (400 m) | 15 yd (14 m) | A brief tornado moved along Route 616 in Amelia County. A country store sustained a blown out window and partial loss of its tin roof. A tin structure about 30 feet (9.1 m) away was leveled. A house sustained shingle loss, and a vehicle sustained minor cosmetic damage from flying debris. Several small trees were downed. An eyewitness reported seeing a funnel cloud. |
| F0 | SE of Georgetown | Madison | NY | 1515 | 1.7 mi (2.7 km) | 100 yd (91 m) | Damage details unavailable. |
| F1 | E of Millington | Kent | MD | 1520 | 4 mi (6.4 km) | 440 yd (400 m) | An intermittent tornado destroyed a cinder-block church building, damaged other buildings, and snapped power poles. The tornado may have continued into northwestern Kent County, Delaware. |
| F0 | Romansville | Chester | PA | 1524 | 0.1 mi (160 m) | 10 yd (9.1 m) | A brief tornado damaged buildings and downed trees. |
| F1 | Wilmington | New Castle | DE | 1530 | 1 mi (1.6 km) | 17 yd (16 m) | This tornado moved through the southern part of downtown Wilmington, blowing off part of a warehouse roof, ripping up part of a chain link fence, and damaging several vehicles. The tornado became a waterspout after moving over the Christina River. It then destroyed a 40-by-50-foot (12 by 15 m) boat shed, ripped two large boats from their moorings, and moved/overturned boats that were in storage. The door of a restaurant was ripped off before the tornado dissipated. One person was injured, the owner of the boat shed. |
| F1 | King of Prussia | Montgomery | PA | 1545 | 1.5 mi (2.4 km) | 50 yd (46 m) | Numerous homes and offices were damaged, with one office building being damaged severely. Three mobile homes were overturned, and hundreds of trees and several power lines were downed. Three people were injured by flying glass. |
| F0 | SW of Telford to NE of Perkasie | Montgomery, Bucks | PA | 1600 | 5.25 mi (8.45 km) | 50 yd (46 m) | More than 55 homes sustained mainly roof damage. Numerous trees were downed. |
| F1 | Yardley, PA to W of Lawrenceville, NJ | Bucks (PA), Mercer (NJ) | PA, NJ | 1615 | 5 mi (8.0 km) | 800 yd (730 m) | In Yardley, a school sustained roof and window damage. One person sustained serious injuries when a tree fell on a vehicle. The tornado crossed the Delaware River near the northwestern part of Trenton, New Jersey, blowing the windows out of a school and collapsing a wall of an apartment complex, causing damage to 36 apartment units. Hundreds of trees were downed along the path. At least four people were injured in total. |
| F0 | Peekskill | Westchester | NY | 1615 | 0.5 mi (0.80 km) | 15 yd (14 m) | Damage details unavailable. |
| F0 | Williamstown | Gloucester | NJ | 1620 | 1 mi (1.6 km) | 50 yd (46 m) | A supermarket sustained partial roof loss, where one person was injured by a falling brick. A steel building was damaged, two semi trailers were blown over, and several trees were downed. |
| F0 | SE of Branchville | Sussex | NJ | 1630 | 0.5 mi (0.80 km) | 50 yd (46 m) | The tornado occurred in Augusta. Damage details unavailable. |
| F1 | Barryville to Grahamsville | Sullivan | NY | 1640–1658 | 1.5 mi (2.4 km) | 200 yd (180 m) | The official path length is 1.5 miles (2.4 km), but the distance from Barryville to Grahamsville is much farther. |
| F0 | Roseland | Essex | NJ | 1700 | 0.2 mi (320 m) | 15 yd (14 m) | Damage details unavailable. |
| F0 | Piscataway | Middlesex | NJ | 1704 | 0.5 mi (0.80 km) | 15 yd (14 m) | Damage details unavailable. |
| F1 | Monroe to Coldenham | Orange | NY | 1705–1731 | 9.1 mi (14.6 km) | 100 yd (91 m) | 9 deaths – See article on this tornado – 18 people were injured. Likely a downburst, rather than a tornado according to Grazulis and Fujita. |
| F1 | Lyndhurst/Rutherford | Bergen | NJ | 1720 | 0.5 mi (0.80 km) | 30 yd (27 m) | Damage details unavailable. |
| F0 | Linden | Union | NJ | 1725 | 1 mi (1.6 km) | 15 yd (14 m) | Damage details unavailable. |
| F0 | W of Long Lake | Hamilton | NY | 1730 | 1.7 mi (2.7 km) | 100 yd (91 m) | Damage details unavailable. |
| F1 | Porter Corners | Saratoga | NY | 1820 | 0.3 mi (0.48 km) | 20 yd (18 m) | Damage details unavailable. One person was injured. |
| F1 | S of Corinth | Saratoga | NY | 1850 | 0.1 mi (0.16 km) | 25 yd (23 m) | Damage details unavailable. |
| F0 | Buskirk | Rensselaer | NY | 1930 | 0.1 mi (0.16 km) | 17 yd (16 m) | Damage details unavailable. |
| F2 | Mont-Saint-Hilaire | La Vallée-du-Richelieu | QC | Unknown | Unknown | Unknown | One of the latest season tornadoes ever reported in Canada. Caused $2,000,000 in damage to the community. |

=== Huntsville, Alabama ===
Huntsville, Alabama
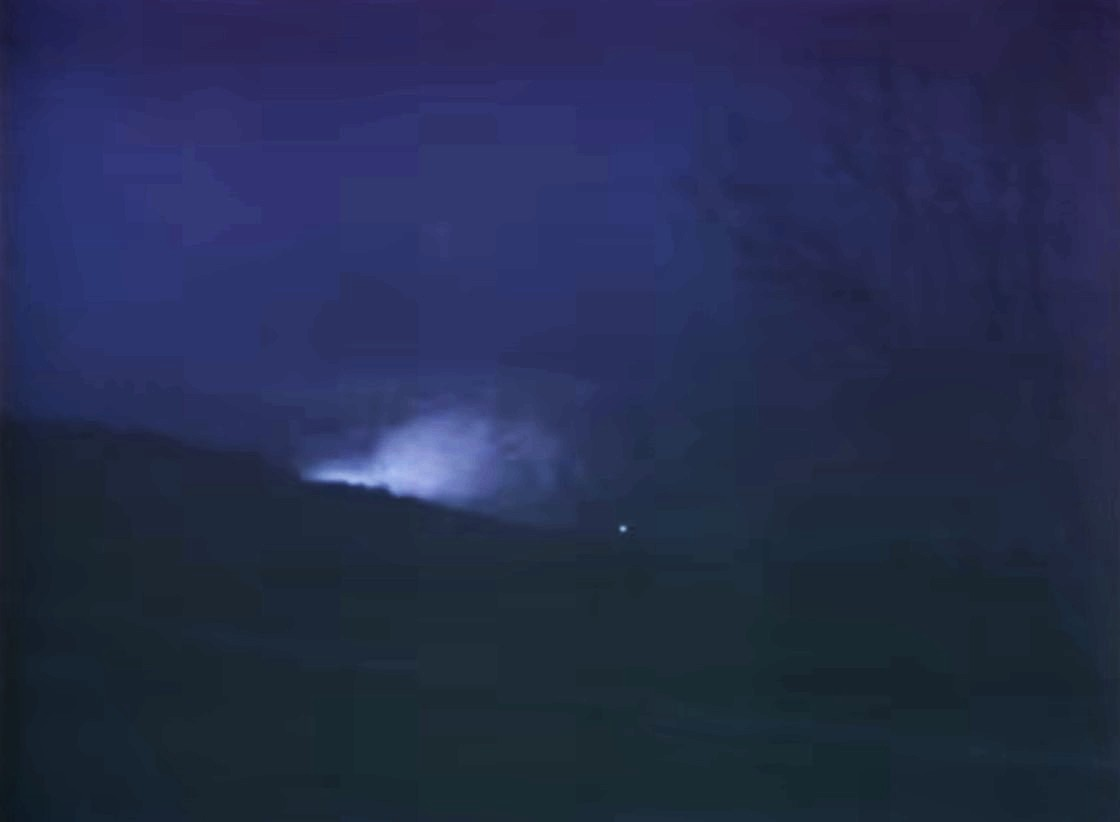
- The tornado being illuminated by a power flash at peak intensity as seen from a mountain-top camera.

F4 tornado
- on the Fujita scale

Overall effects
- Fatalities: 21
- Injuries: 463
- Damage: $100 million (1989 USD)

On the afternoon of Wednesday, November 15, at 4:35 p.m. CST (21:35 UTC), this violent and deadly tornado struck the southern portion of the city of Huntsville, cutting a swath of destruction from southwest toward the northeast through a business section and a heavily populated residential area. Also known as the Airport Road tornado, it took a total of 21 lives as a result of the tornado and 463 were injured. Eighteen people died in the immediate aftermath of the tornado, with two other people dying in early December and another passing away in January from injuries sustained in the tornado. Total damage estimates were placed around $100 million.

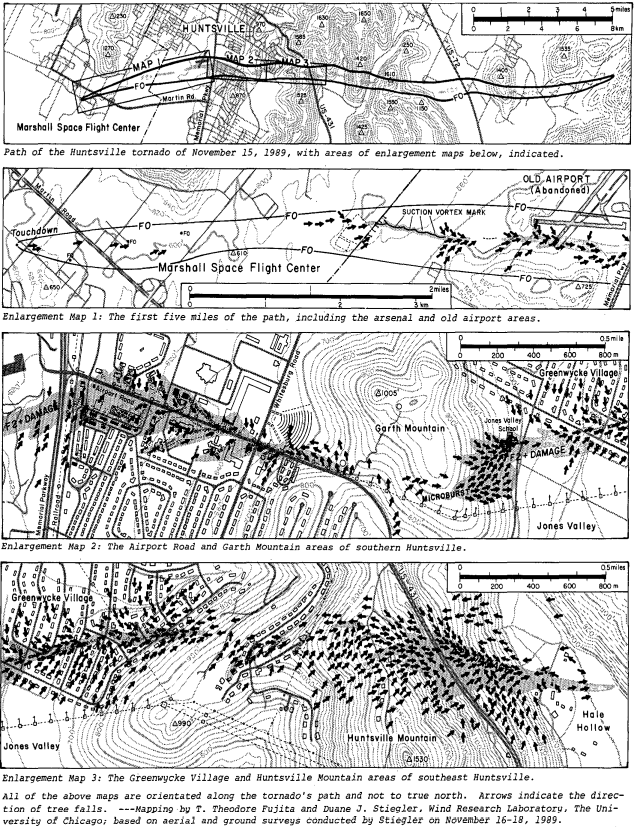
A detailed track of the tornado from the National Weather Service.

The tornado struck during the beginning of rush hour and touched down initially on Redstone Arsenal and then moved into a business area crossing two major north–south highways. Twelve of the 21 deaths (57 percent) occurred in automobiles, a striking similarity to the 1979 tornado that struck Wichita Falls, Texas. In the Huntsville tornado, most of those killed in cars were in the process of performing normal tasks as opposed to seeking automobiles for safety.

As the thunderstorm moved into the southwest corner of Madison County at 4:15 p.m. (21:15 UTC), the staff on duty at the WSO at Huntsville International Airport observed a wall cloud and rain-free base with the thunderstorm. The wall cloud showed no signs of rotation and dissipated shortly after being spotted. Shortly after this, between 4:20 and 4:30 p.m. (21:20–21:30 UTC), meteorologists working for NASA on Redstone Arsenal observed a wall cloud and rain-free base with the thunderstorm as it moved across the southern portion of the Arsenal. Around 4:25 p.m. (21:25 UTC), they observed rotation in the wall cloud.

According to information shared with the National Weather Service by Duane Stiegler with Dr. Ted Fujita's group from the University of Chicago, the initial point of damage occurred one mile south-southwest of Madkin Mountain on Redstone Arsenal near the intersection of Fowler Road and Mills Road at around 4:30 p.m. (21:30 UTC). Trees were downed and some roof gutters damaged. From eyewitness accounts of the wall cloud, circulating air may have reached the ground without a visible funnel.

The tornado continued on a northeast track passing northeast of Building 5250 on the Arsenal, with little damage done to that building. The storm then moved into a sparsely developed area, but it did cause about $1 million in damage to Huntsville's garbage-burning plant which was nearing the end of construction. At this point, the tornado began to cross the old Huntsville Airport and a large portion of the adjacent municipal golf course. It was here that the tornado struck the Huntsville Police Academy, generating one of the first reports of the existence of the tornado. Two officers were injured at the Police Academy.

From the golf course, the tornado entered a business-filled and heavily populated area of Huntsville. The tornado crossed Memorial Parkway (US 231 and SR 53), a major north–south traffic artery. The tornado destroyed a number of shopping complexes, office buildings, churches, and much of the Waterford Square apartment complex as it slowly crossed Airport Road. It crossed Whitesburg Drive, another relatively major north–south highway. Nineteen of the twenty-one fatalities occurred in the area between the intersection of Airport Road and Memorial Parkway and the intersection of Airport Road and Whitesburg Drive. Eleven of the deaths occurred in automobiles, four in apartments, and four in commercial buildings.

From the intersection of Whitesburg Drive and Airport Road, the tornado moved up Garth Mountain, as it continued on a northeast course. This took the tornado into a heavily wooded section. As it crossed the top of Garth Mountain and moved down the east side, it struck Jones Valley Elementary School on Garth Road. Thirty-seven children, five teachers, and seven painters were in the school when the tornado struck, part of an extended daycare program conducted at the school. The lead teacher of the daycare program moved the children from the second floor of the school building into a small open area under the stairway on the first floor. This action, first suggested by the school principal as she left for the day, saved the lives of the children. One woman was killed in an automobile driving along Garth Road on the way to the school.

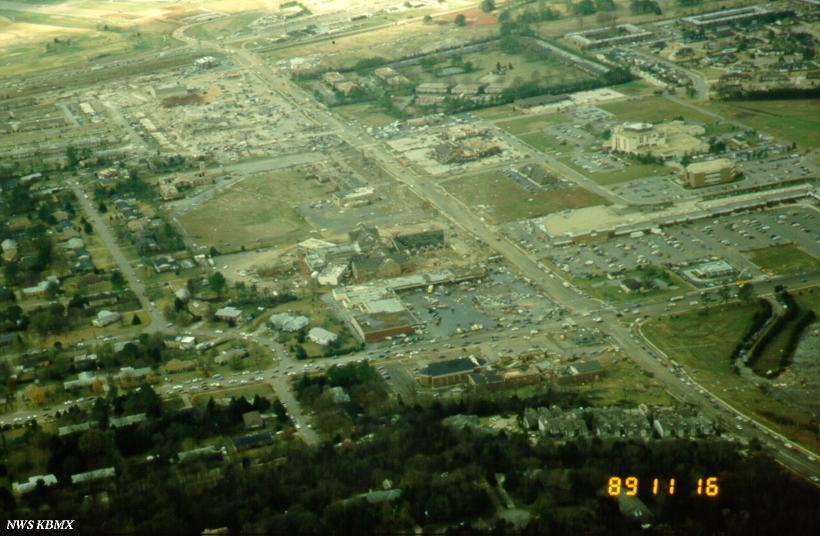
An aerial view of leveled buildings the day after Huntsville tornado.

From the school, the tornado crossed Garth Road and moved across a portion of Jones Valley Subdivision, a development of well-constructed single family homes. The tornado severely damaged or destroyed a number of homes in the Jones Valley subdivision. It continued across Jones Valley before moving through a low gap between Round Top Mountain and Huntsville Mountain, passing just southeast of Monte Sano. The area from Huntsville Mountain to the end of the tornado path was mostly rural, with only scattered structures. However, the tornado continued to destroy or severely damage whatever structures it encountered.

The tornado topped the northern edge of Huntsville Mountain and moved down the east side, crossing US 431. It traveled through a valley in the vicinity of Dug Hill before moving up and over Chestnut Knob. From Chestnut Knob, the tornado traversed the Flint River valley referred to as Salty Bottoms, crossing the Flint River and US 72 one mile southeast of Brownsboro. It moved across the present-day location of Madison County High School (not built until 1999) and continued on an east-northeast track over Reed Mountain and Jasper Point to a small lake (known as Smith Lake) at the headwaters of the Killingsworth Cove Branch, a small creek which feeds into the Flint River. The tornado path ended at the southeast tip of the lake at 4:50 p.m. (21:50 UTC).

The total path length was 18.5 miles (29.8 km) from the initial beginning on Redstone Arsenal to its end at Smith Lake. The damage path was generally about one-half mile wide; however, it reached nearly one mile in width in the Flint River/US 72 area.

==== Damage estimates ====
Outbreak death toll
| State | Total | County | County total |
|---|---|---|---|
| Alabama | 21 | Madison | 21 |
| New York | 9 | Orange | 9 |
| Totals | 30 | | |

A summary of damage from reports gathered by the Huntsville Times included:

- 259 homes destroyed; 130 homes with major damage; 148 homes with minor to moderate damage
- 80 businesses destroyed; 8 businesses damaged
- 3 churches heavily damaged
- 2 schools destroyed
- 10 public buildings destroyed or heavily damaged
- $1.9 million in public utility damage

=== Monroe–Coldenham, New York ===
Monroe–Coldenham, New York
- The collapsed wall of East Coldenham Elementary School following the tornado.

F1 tornado
- on the Fujita scale

Overall effects
- Fatalities: 9
- Injuries: 18
- Damage: $25 million (1989 USD)

Official records state that this weak but deadly F1 tornado touched down to the south in Monroe at approximately 12:31 p.m. EST (17:31 UTC), moving north for around nine miles (14 km) to the East Coldenham area. As the storm struck the elementary school, approximately 120 children were eating lunch in the school cafeteria. One of the walls collapsed onto numerous children, killing seven instantly and injuring at least 20. Two of the injured later died in hospitals. When the tornado began to hit the school, the principal and other staff began trying to move students into the hallways in the immediate seconds before the collapse. Roughly 200 state and local police, fire fighters, and ambulance workers converged on the school to provide assistance, along with 25 ambulances, several fire rescue vans, and a helicopter. The search and rescue operations were completed by 7:15 p.m. EST (00:15 UTC) that evening.

== See also ==
- List of North American tornadoes and tornado outbreaks
- List of Storm Prediction Center high risk days
- List of tornado-related deaths at schools List of tornado-related deaths at schools
- 1995 Anderson Hills tornado
