= May 1989 tornado outbreak =

Weather event in the United States

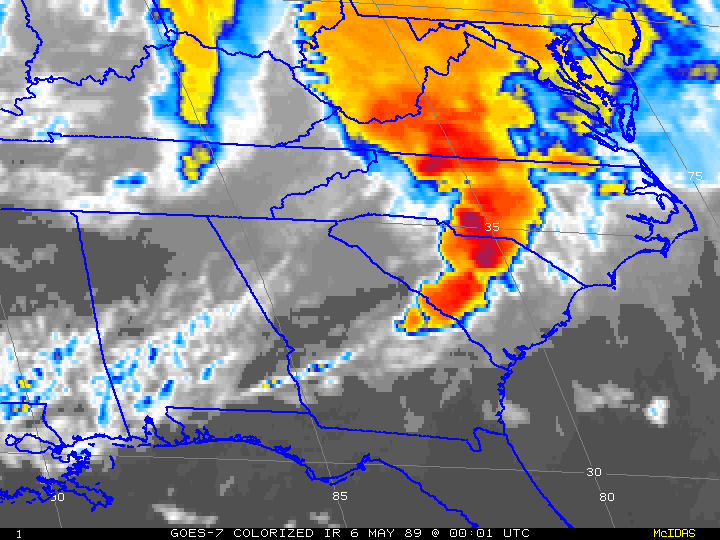
- May 6, 1989 infrared radar imagery featuring storm system responsible for the outbreak

Meteorological history
- Duration: May 5, 1989

Tornado outbreak
- Tornadoes: 16
- Max. rating: F4 tornado
- Duration: ~ 7 hours

Overall effects
- Fatalities: 7
- Injuries: 168
- Damage: $169 million (non-normalized)
- Areas affected: Georgia, The Carolinas, Virginia

The May 1989 tornado outbreak occurred on May 4–6, 1989. The outbreak spawned at least 27 tornadoes across the southeast and mid-Atlantic regions, especially in Georgia, South Carolina, North Carolina and Virginia. It was responsible for a combined total of $169 million in damage in the four states. It also caused 7 deaths and 168 injuries.

== Confirmed tornadoes ==
Confirmed tornadoes by Fujita rating
FU	F0	F1	F2	F3	F4	F5	Total
0	0	8	5	1	3	0	16

List of confirmed tornadoes – Friday, May 5, 1989
F#	Location	County	State	Time (EST)	Path length	Summary
F1	Gainesville	Hall	GA	03:20	1 mi (1.6 km)	Minor damage occurred northeast of Gainesville.
F2	Toccoa, GA	Stephens (GA), Oconee (SC)	GA, SC	04:00	8 mi (13 km)	A tornado crossed from Georgia into South Carolina near Toccoa. A shopping plaza was severely damaged, and a drugstore and a supermarket sustained major structural damage. Homes and mobile homes were damaged as well, and downed power lines started a house fire. $2.9 million in damage.
F1	Walhalla	Oconee	SC	04:40	2 mi (3.2 km)	A brief tornado touched down.
F4	SW of Chesnee, SC to SW of Henrietta, NC	Spartanburg (SC), Cherokee (SC), Rutherford (NC)	SC, NC	05:20	15 mi (24 km)	2 deaths – A funnel cloud spotted near Boiling Springs and formed into a near half-mile wide violent tornado as it passed close to Chesnee, SC in Spartanburg County. It crossed the state line into Southeastern Rutherford County where it ended near Henrietta. There were two fatalities and 35 people were injured, all of which occurred in Spartanburg County. Seventeen mobile homes were destroyed and another seven were damaged. Twenty-nine houses were destroyed and 57 more were damaged. Caused approximately $3,000,000 in damage.
F4	NW of Lawndale	Cleveland, Lincoln, Catawba	NC	05:50	14 mi (23 km)	4 deaths – A half-mile wide, multiple-vortex tornado caused severe damage in the communities of Belwood and Vale. In Cleveland County, 15 homes were destroyed and 34 others were damaged. Some of the destroyed homes were well-built. Two churches were destroyed as well. In Lincoln County, the tornado struck the community of Toluca, killing four people. 10 homes and 9 trailers were destroyed, and 12 other residences were damaged in the county. Three of the fatalities in Toluca were in vehicles, some of which were carried up to 300 yards away. In Catawba County, 13 homes and 4 mobile homes were damaged or destroyed. Caused millions of dollars in damage and injured 53 people.
F2	Durham	Durham	NC	06:20	9 mi (14 km)	A strong tornado moved through southern and eastern Durham. Two businesses were destroyed, and a convenience store was nearly destroyed. Sixteen homes were destroyed and 46 others were damaged. An elementary school was damaged as well. Caused $15,000,000 in damage.
F2	Lenoir	Caldwell	NC	06:28	15 mi (24 km)	Moderate damage was observed in Lenoir.
F4	W of Monroe to S of Fairview	Union	NC	07:00	13 mi (21 km)	1 death – A violent tornado struck the Charlotte suburb of Indian Trail. Twelve homes and ten mobile homes were destroyed, and 24 residences sustained varying degrees of damage. Three businesses were heavily damaged, and a flea market was destroyed as well. The fatality occurred in a mobile home. Six people were injured, and the damage was $8,000,000.
F1	W of Oxford	Granville	NC	07:05	3 mi (4.8 km)	Another tornado was spawned by the Durham supercell.
F2	Clemmons	Forsyth	NC	07:45	1 mi (1.6 km)	A tornado struck the Winston-Salem suburb of Clemmons. A gas station was destroyed, trees were downed, and homes were damaged. Three people were injured.
F3	Winston-Salem	Forsyth	NC	07:50	11 mi (18 km)	The second Forsyth County tornado produced over $25 million in damage on a southwest to northeast track through the city, striking colonial-era neighborhoods and just missing downtown. The storm crossed old I-40 in multiple locations. Widespread downburst damage occurred in many locations around Winston-Salem. Thirty people were injured.
F2	S of Wadesboro to W of Morven	Anson	NC	07:50	5 mi (8.0 km)	A trailer, a house, and several barns were destroyed. Five other residences were damaged, and one person was injured.
F1	Oakboro	Stanly	NC	08:00	0.5 mi (0.80 km)	A brief tornado was spawned by the same storm that produced the earlier Indian Trail tornado.
F2	N of Walkertown	Forsyth	NC	08:05	6 mi (9.7 km)	The third Forsyth County tornado formed almost immediately after the Winston-Salem tornado dissipated and continued along an extension of the same path. Hangars were damaged and 30 aircraft were tossed at Smith-Reynolds Airport.
F1	Burlington to Elon	Alamance	NC	Unknown	3 mi (4.8 km)	A tornado produced F1 damage in western Burlington and Elon.
F1	Louisa (1st tornado)	Louisa	VA	09:00	2 mi (3.2 km)	A tornado touched down between Charlottesville and Richmond with F1 damage observed along a short, but wide path.
F1	Louisa (2nd tornado)	Louisa	VA	09:50	2 mi (3.2 km)	A second Louisa County tornado touched down from a separate thunderstorm, several miles east of the previous Louisa tornado.

== Georgia and South Carolina ==
Outbreak death toll
State	Total	County	County total
North Carolina	5	Lincoln	4
North Carolina	5	Union	1
South Carolina	2	Spartanburg	2
Totals	7		
All deaths were tornado-related

The first tornadoes of this outbreak were reported between 1 and 2 P.M. near Gainesville, Georgia and Toccoa, Georgia. During the mid-afternoon, severe storms began moving northeast into the northwest corner of South Carolina, spawning additional tornadoes in Oconee County.

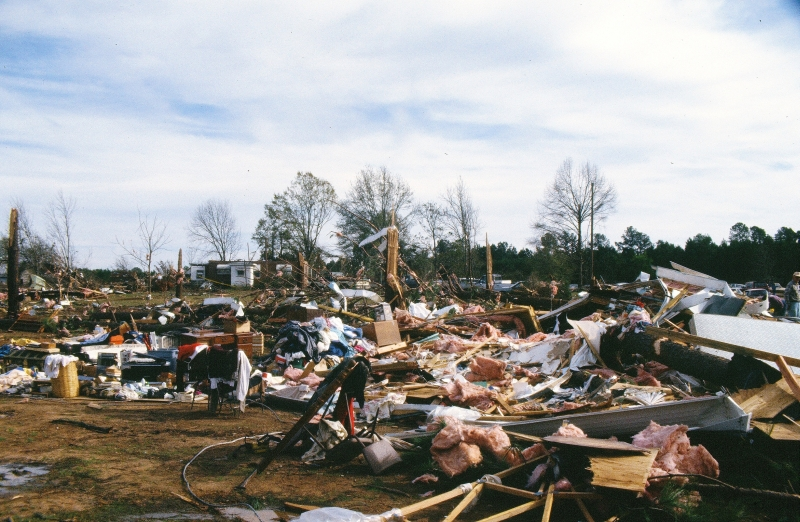
A damaged neighborhood after the Chesnee, South Carolina F4 tornado.

The first violent tornado of the day, otherwise known as the Chesnee F4 Tornado, formed around 5:20 pm. in Spartanburg County in South Carolina north of Boiling Springs and southwest of Chesnee. Along its 15-mile path to Henrietta in Rutherford County, North Carolina it killed two people and injured 35 others. The first casualty was a 66-year-old man who died when a chimney fell onto him. The other was a 59-year-old woman who died attempting to flee her mobile home. In addition, it caused significant damage to several commercial buildings and outbuildings in Spartanburg. After the tornado crossed the state line near Montgomery Drive into North Carolina it caused further damage to three mobile homes, one business, and four permanent residences (one of which was constructed with brick). In total, the Chesnee F4 Tornado caused approximately $3 million in property damage.

== North Carolina and Virginia ==
Other F4 tornadoes soon formed just to the north (on a path from northern Cleveland County to southwest of Hickory), and also in Union County, southeast of Charlotte. The Cleveland-Lincoln-Catawba tornado caused 30 injuries and $20 million in property damage in the Belwood community, before then causing 4 fatalities and 19 additional injuries in the Toluca community in northwestern Lincoln County. Weaker tornadoes were noted in the NC foothills near Lenoir, and the Union County supercell later spawned F1 tornadoes in nearby Anson and Stanly counties.

Multiple downed trees on top of a two-story house after the Winston-Salem, North Carolina F3 tornado.

Later in the afternoon, a strong F3 tornado produced $25 million in damage on a southwest-to-northeast path through the city of Winston-Salem. Damage from this storm was visible along Business I-40 and US 421 in southwest Winston-Salem. The historic Old Salem area was also hard hit; many century-old trees in Salem Square and God's Acre were heavily damaged by the winds and had to be removed. Due to the difficulty in getting heavy equipment into the cemetery Gods Acre, those trees were removed by a helicopter. In the surrounding areas of Forsyth County, North Carolina, two other tornadoes were confirmed between 5:30 and 6:15 P.M. Strong winds associated with the same squall line downed a radio transmission tower in nearby High Point. Winds toppled large trees and caused roof damage in the Emerywood neighborhood of the city. At about the same time, a series of weaker and short-lived tornadoes nonetheless also managed to produce $27.5 million in damage in northern Durham and southwest Granville counties.

Later in the evening, the last two tornadoes of the outbreak produced minor damage in Louisa County, between Richmond and Charlottesville.

== Ultimate toll ==
Large hail and wind damage reports were widespread – golf-ball sized hail was recorded near Columbia, South Carolina and Monroe, North Carolina, with severe wind reports from over 100 counties from Georgia to Maryland. Some form of storm damage was noted in almost every North Carolina county between I-95 and the Blue Ridge Mountains.

== See also ==
- List of North American tornadoes and tornado outbreaks
