= Tornadoes of 1989 =

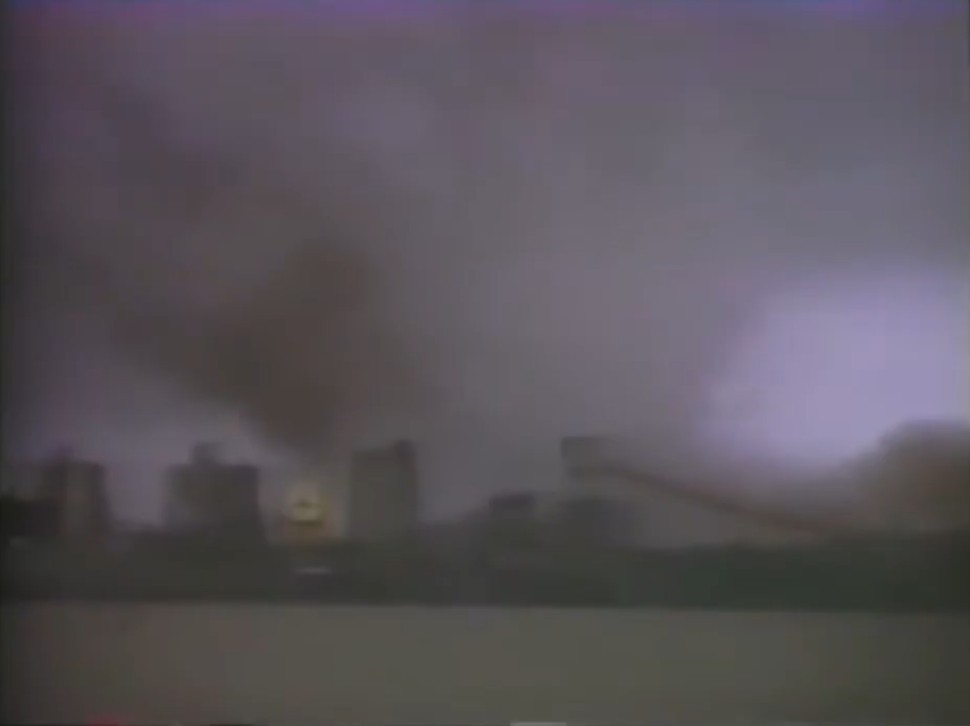
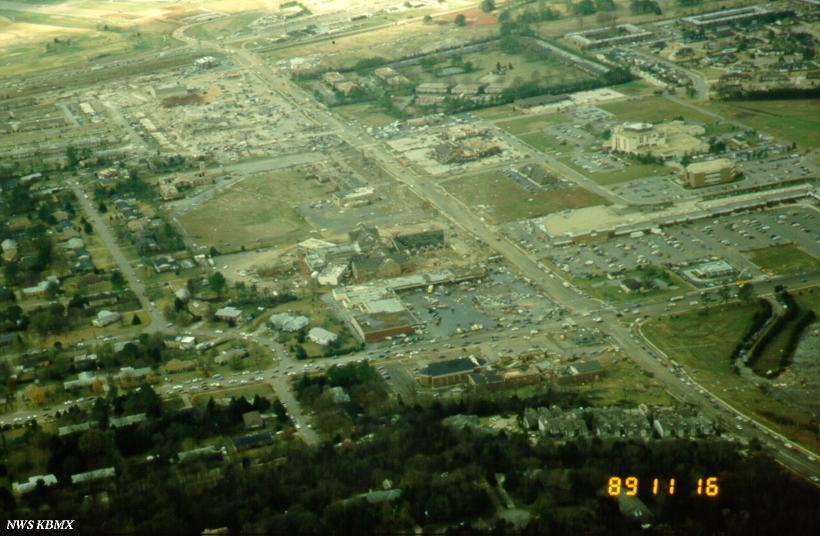
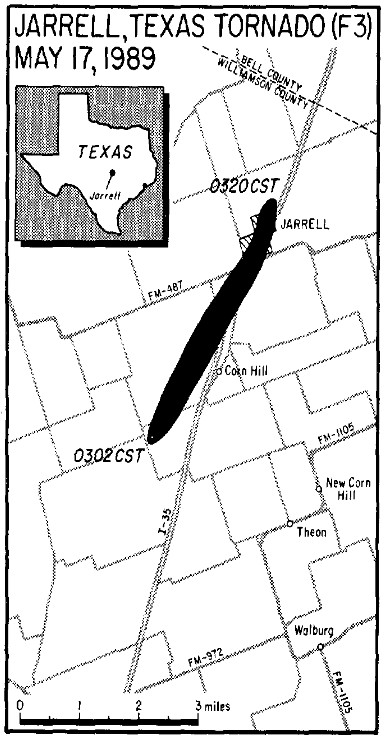
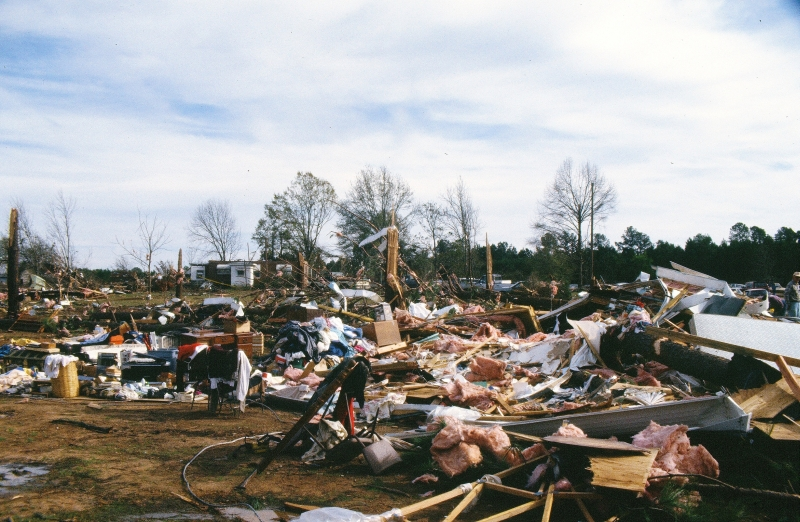
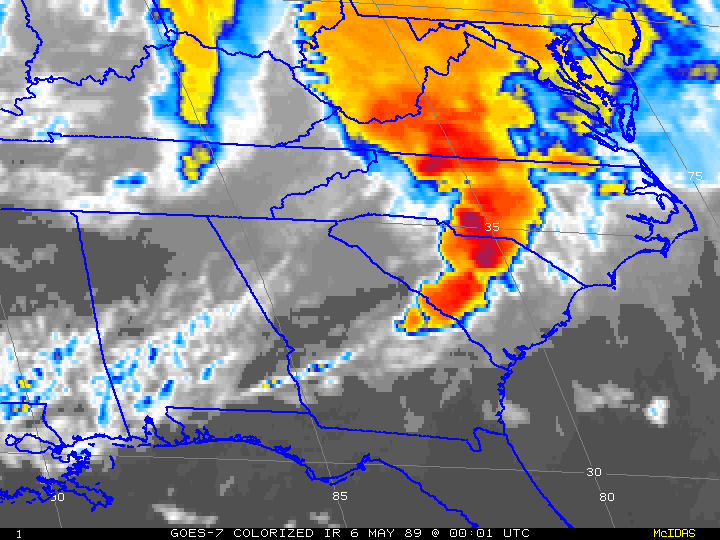
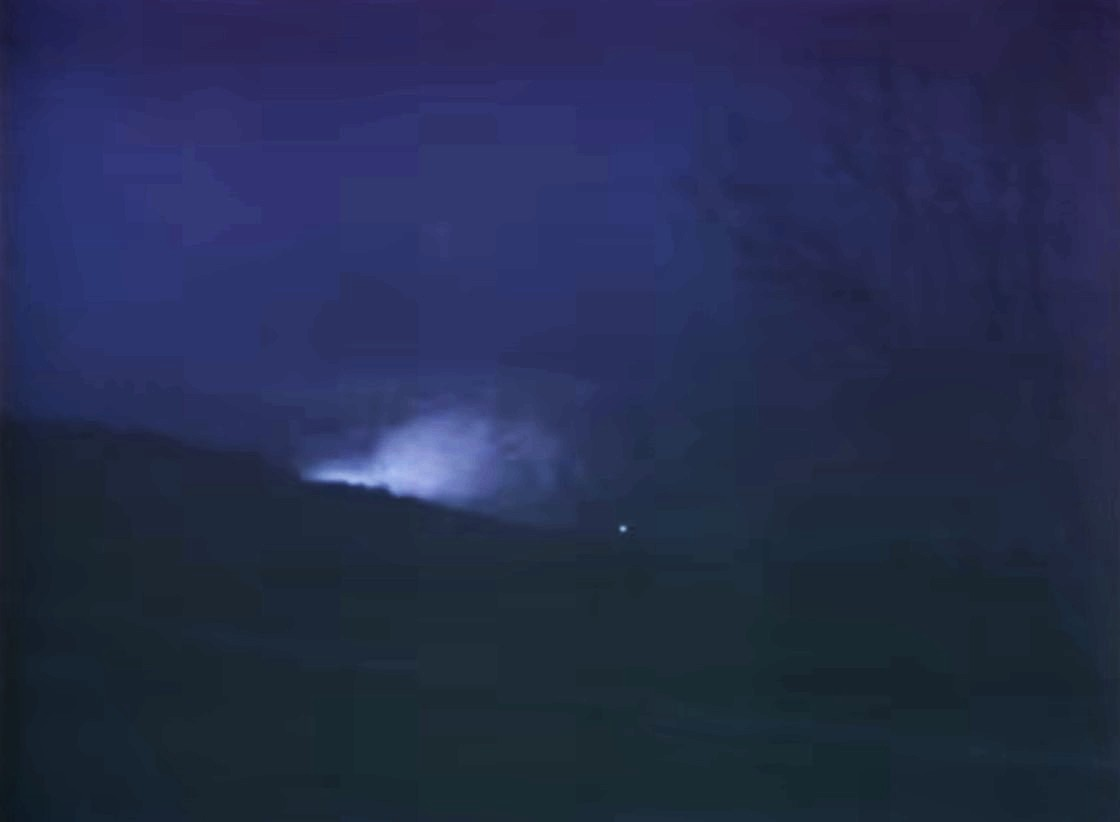
- Clockwise from top: A large F2 tornado in Baton Rouge, Louisiana on June 8; A map showing the path of an F3 tornado that struck Jarrell, Texas on May 17; A satellite image showing tornadic supercells over the Carolinas on May 6, 1989; A large F4 tornado in Huntsville, Alabama on November 15; Damage in Chesnee, South Carolina after an F4 tornado on May 5; An aerial photo of Huntsville, Alabama after an F4 tornado on November 15.
- Timespan: January–December 1989
Maximum rated tornado
F4 tornado
- List
  – Allendale, Illinois
  on January 7
  – Daulatpur-Saturia, Bangladesh
  on April 26
  – Chesnee, South Carolina
  on May 5
  – Belwood-Toluca, North Carolina
  on May 5
  – Indian Trail, North Carolina
  on May 5
  – Brackettville, Texas
  on May 16
  – Prescott, Iowa
  on May 24
  – Liscomb, Iowa
  on May 24
  – Union, Iowa
  on May 30
  – Schoharie, New York
  on July 10
  – Hamden, Connecticut
  on July 10
  – Huntsville, Alabama
  on November 15
- Tornadoes in U.S.: 856
- Damage (U.S.): >$483 million
- Fatalities (U.S.): 50
- Fatalities (worldwide): >1,300

This page documents the tornadoes and tornado outbreaks of 1989, primarily in the United States. Most tornadoes form in the U.S., although some events may take place internationally. Tornado statistics for older years like this often appear significantly lower than modern years due to fewer reports or confirmed tornadoes.

== Synopsis ==
Fatal United States tornadoes in 1989
- Approximate touchdown location of killer tornadoes in 1989
Summary of tornadoes
- March 5 – Alabama, Georgia (1 death)
- May 5 – South Carolina, North Carolina (2 deaths)
- May 5 – North Carolina (4 deaths)
- May 5 – North Carolina (1 death)
- May 17 – Texas (1 death)
- May 22 – Tennessee (1 death)
- June 8 – Louisiana (2 deaths)
- June 8 – Florida (3 deaths)
- October 1 – Georgia (2 deaths)
- October 14 – New York (2 deaths)
- November 8 – Georgia (1 death)
- November 15 – Alabama (21 deaths)
- November 16 – New York (9 deaths)
Total fatalities: 50

1989 was an average year in terms of numbers of tornadoes and fatalities. May and June both saw over 200 tornadoes and after the usual summer lull, a significant November outbreak led to the devastating Huntsville, Alabama, F4 tornado.

== Events ==
Confirmed tornadoes by Fujita rating
FU	F0	F1	F2	F3	F4	F5	Total
0	369	364	102	10	11	0	856

== January ==
There were 14 tornadoes confirmed in the US in January.

=== January 7 ===
FU	F0	F1	F2	F3	F4	F5
0	2	3	2	0	1	0

A small tornado outbreak impacted parts of Illinois, Indiana, and Mississippi. An F4 tornado destroyed dozens of homes and businesses in Allendale, Illinois before moving into Indiana, injuring 55 people. An F2 tornado injured six people along an intermittent path in eastern Illinois, destroying six homes and damaging 46 in Mill Shoals. Another F2 tornado caused significant damage in the business district of Prairie, Mississippi.

== February ==
There were 18 tornadoes confirmed in the US in February.

=== February 20–21 ===
FU	F0	F1	F2	F3	F4	F5
0	2	11	4	0	0	0

An outbreak brought 17 tornadoes to the Southern United States on February 20 and 21. Four F2 tornadoes touched down in northeastern Mississippi and northwestern Alabama. One caused significant damage near Sulligent, Alabama on February 20. All six tornadoes that touched down the next day were weak. An F0 tornado injured one person north of Dillon, South Carolina.

== March ==
There were 43 tornadoes confirmed in the US in March.

=== March 4–5 ===
FU	F0	F1	F2	F3	F4	F5
0	1	8	2	2	0	0

An outbreak of 13 tornadoes, stretching from Mississippi to Georgia, occurred through the overnight hours of March 4 and into the night of March 5. An F2 tornado traveled 53 miles through Chambers County, Alabama, Randolph County, Heard County, Georgia, and Coweta County, the tornado caused the first tornado-related fatality in Georgia since 1977 when a 68-year-old man was killed in his mobile home near Franklin. A tornado also hit south and east of Newnan, Georgia, dealing F3 damage to a motel, ripping the roof off and collapsing walls injuring 8 people. Other buildings, such as those in the White Oaks subdivision were damaged or destroyed. Another F3 tornado occurred in Hinds County, Mississippi, the second of three tornadoes in a family, it destroyed 9 houses and 2 barns, injuring 5 and killing many cattle.

== April ==
There were 82 tornadoes confirmed in the US in April.

=== April 3 ===
An F3 tornado hit Fort Branch, Indiana. Although there were no fatalities, eight people were injured and damage was estimated between 5 and 50 million dollars.

=== April 26 (Bangladesh) ===
An extremely destructive and deadly tornado struck the Manikganj District in central Bangladesh. The tornado affected the cities of Daulatpur and Saturia the most, moving east through Daulatpur and eventually northeast and into Saturia. In total, this tornado killed an estimated 1,300 people making it the deadliest single tornado in world history.

== May ==
There were 231 tornadoes confirmed in the US in May, including seven F4 tornadoes.

=== May 5 ===
FU	F0	F1	F2	F3	F4	F5
0	0	8	5	1	3	0

A deadly outbreak spawned 17 tornadoes in Georgia, South Carolina, North Carolina and Virginia, and was responsible for a combined total of $169 million in damage in the four states. It also caused seven deaths and 168 injuries.

=== May 24 ===
FU	F0	F1	F2	F3	F4	F5
0	16	10	1	0	2	0

On May 24, an outbreak brought 29 tornadoes to the Upper Midwest. An F4 tornado destroyed a farm near Prescott, Iowa, scattering three hundred pigs across a field. A second F4 tornado destroyed two farms east of Liscomb, Iowa. This storm injured three people on one farm according to Thomas P. Grazulis, but no injuries are listed in official records. An F2 tornado destroyed a home and several outbuildings near Cainsville, Missouri. All other tornadoes in this outbreak were weak, rated F0 or F1.

== June ==
There were 252 tornadoes confirmed in the US in June.

=== June 3 (Philippines) ===
An EF1 tornado that was accompanied by flash floods struck Malita, Davao Occidental where it destroyed 150 Houses, including two bridges, and left more than 600 people homeless. A total of 13 people were killed, four of them were children, including a 9-month old baby after being hit by a fallen tree, and four people were injured.

=== June 8 ===
Two tornadoes killed five people in Florida and Louisiana. In Baton Rouge, Louisiana, an F2 hit an aluminum plant at 6:30 AM, killing two. The same storm spawned a brief multi-vortex F1 in Plaquemine, Louisiana with no serious damage. Later in the afternoon, an F2 came ashore east of Apalachicola, Florida, killing three.

=== June 15 ===
An F2 tornado touched down on the eastern end of the city of York and made a sporadic path of damage northeast across the Susquehanna River near Wrightsville to its endpoint. In York County the tornado crossed 8 miles of its path length, causing damage to 16 homes, a business, a church, 5 garages and 3 barns. Some of them received extensive damage. Many trees were uprooted or broken off and one woman was injured by a falling limb. The tornado was seen crossing the Susquehanna River drawing up water into its funnel at 5:30 PM EST. The tornado continued east for another 7 miles across Lancaster County, causing damage in Columbia, Mountville and just to the west of Millersville. In Lancaster County 4 homes were destroyed, 9 houses were damaged, and an excavating company warehouse was knocked down. Many trees were uprooted or broken off and many vehicles were damaged or destroyed. A total of 7 people received minor injuries, 3 in York County and 4 in Lancaster County.

=== June 25 ===
A violent F3 wedge tornado ripped the roofs off of several homes in North Platte, Nebraska. There were no injuries reported.

== July ==
There were 59 tornadoes confirmed in the US in July.

=== July 10 ===
FU	F0	F1	F2	F3	F4	F5
0	4	7	4	0	2	0

A series of tornadoes caused more than $130 million (1989 USD) in damage across the Northeastern United States on July 10. The storm system affected five states with severe weather, including hail up to 2.5 inches (6.4 cm) in diameter, thunderstorm winds up to 90 mph (150 km/h), and 17 tornadoes.

=== July 31 (Philippines) ===
A tornado hit certain parts of Metro Manila at around 03:00 PhST. It destroyed several houses and uprooted trees which amounted to ₱1 million. A total of 9 people were injured from the tornado. Five people were killed in Malabon after the tornado collapsed a concrete wall. In Caloocan, three houses were damaged as the tornado blew away roofs. In Quezon City, a concrete wall from a memorial garden collapsed. Debris were scattered next to the North Luzon Expressway. The tornado caused power outages in the area after it toppled electrical posts. After the incident, the Philippine National Red Cross and the Department of Social Welfare and Development began relief operations for tornado victims.

== August ==
There were 36 tornadoes confirmed in the US in August.

== September ==
There were 31 tornadoes confirmed in the US in September.

=== September 10 (Philippines) ===
A tornado spawned by Typhoon Sarah (Openg) struck San Miguel Naval Communications Station in San Antonio, Zambales where it uprooted trees, toppled power lines, and damaged buildings worth estimating $150,000. It also injured 2 people after a tree struck their vehicle.

== October ==
There were 30 tornadoes confirmed in the US in October.

== November ==
There were 57 tornadoes confirmed in the US in November.

=== November 15–16 ===
FU	F0	F1	F2	F3	F4	F5
0	15	15	8	1	1	0

A destructive tornado outbreak affected a large swath of the southern and eastern United States as well as Canada in Mid-November. It produced at least 40 tornadoes, with 30 deaths coming as a result of two deadly tornadoes. The most devastating tornado occurred in Huntsville, Alabama, when an F4 tornado killed 21 people on the afternoon of the 15th. Twelve of the people killed in Huntsville were in cars. Nine more fatalities were reported at a single elementary school by an F1 tornado on the 16th in Newburgh, New York (although analysis has concluded that this was more likely the result of a downburst). Tornadoes occurred across 15 states and Quebec during the outbreak.

== December ==
There were 3 tornadoes confirmed in the US in December.

=== December 12 ===
An F1 tornado began south of Chipley, Florida and moved to north of Cottondale, along a path of 10 miles (16 km) with a maximum width of 50 yards (46 m). One home was damaged near Chipley and five others were damaged near Cottondale. A satellite or twin funnel cloud was identified with this tornado. The National Centers for Environmental Information estimates the damage caused by the tornado was $500,000 (1989 USD).

== See also ==
- Tornado
  - Tornadoes by year
  - Tornado records
  - Tornado climatology
  - Tornado myths
- List of tornado outbreaks
  - List of F5 and EF5 tornadoes
  - List of North American tornadoes and tornado outbreaks
  - List of 21st-century Canadian tornadoes and tornado outbreaks
  - List of European tornadoes and tornado outbreaks
  - List of tornadoes and tornado outbreaks in Asia
  - List of Southern Hemisphere tornadoes and tornado outbreaks
  - List of tornadoes striking downtown areas
- Tornado intensity
  - Fujita scale
  - Enhanced Fujita scale
