= 1989 Coldenham tornado =

1989 F1 tornado in New York, US

- The collapsed wall, as seen after the tornado.

Meteorological history
- Date: November 16, 1989
- Formed: November 16, 1989 , 12:31 pm. CDT (UTC−05:00)
- Dissipated: November 16, 1989 , 12:57 pm. CDT (UTC−05:00)
- Duration: 26 minutes

F1 tornado
- on the Fujita scale
- Highest winds: ~100 mph (160 km/h)

Overall effects
- Fatalities: 9 (+1 indirect)
- Injuries: 18
- Damage: $25 million (1989 USD)
- Areas affected: Orange County, New York
- Part of the November 1989 tornado outbreak and Tornadoes of 1989

In the afternoon hours of November 16, 1989, a relatively weak but deadly tornado moved north through Orange County, located in the state of New York. Despite causing relatively little damage for the majority of its path, late in its life the tornado blew down a free-standing cafeteria wall located at the East Coldenham Elementary School, killing nine students and injuring eighteen others. Though the event was officially recorded as a tornado, conclusive evidence from a survey by a team led by Ted Fujita and others indicates that it was likely a downburst instead, although the disaster is still officially attributed to this tornado. If this was in fact a tornado, this would make it the deadliest recorded tornado in New York State history.

== Meteorological synopsis ==
A destructive tornado outbreak struck a wide swath of the Southern and Eastern United States as well as Canada on November 15 and 16, 1989. It produced at least 40 tornadoes, including an F4 tornado in Huntsville, Alabama. Several other significant tornadoes were reported across 15 states.

== Tornado summary ==
Official records state that the tornado touched down to the south in Monroe at approximately 12:31 p.m. EST (17:31 UTC), moving north for around nine miles (14 km) to the East Coldenham area. As the storm struck the elementary school, approximately 120 children were eating lunch in the school cafeteria. One of the walls collapsed onto numerous children, killing seven instantly and injuring at least 20. Two of the injured later died in hospitals. When the tornado began to hit the school, the principal and other staff began trying to move students into the hallways in the immediate seconds before the collapse. Roughly 200 state and local police, fire fighters, and ambulance workers converged on the school to provide assistance, along with 25 ambulances, several fire rescue vans, and a helicopter. The search and rescue operations were completed by 7:15 p.m. EST (00:15 UTC) that evening.

== Aftermath ==
=== Fatalities ===
Ten people were killed by the tornado; nine of these fatalities were direct. All ten people killed were children; the tenth child was hit and killed by a distracted driver who was staring at the damaged elementary school. The other nine deaths occurred when a brick-laden wall that supported the cafeteria ceiling gave out while children were eating lunch, collapsing into the building and killing seven, with two more children dying at hospitals days later.

The disaster received a tremendous amount of national and international media coverage at the time of the tragedy because most major news media outlets were at the United States Military Academy at West Point, New York, just ten miles away, to cover the awarding of the Sylvanus Thayer Award to former President Ronald Reagan, and accordingly were on site within minutes.

== See also ==
- 1978 Whippoorwill tornado
