= Belwood, North Carolina =

- Town
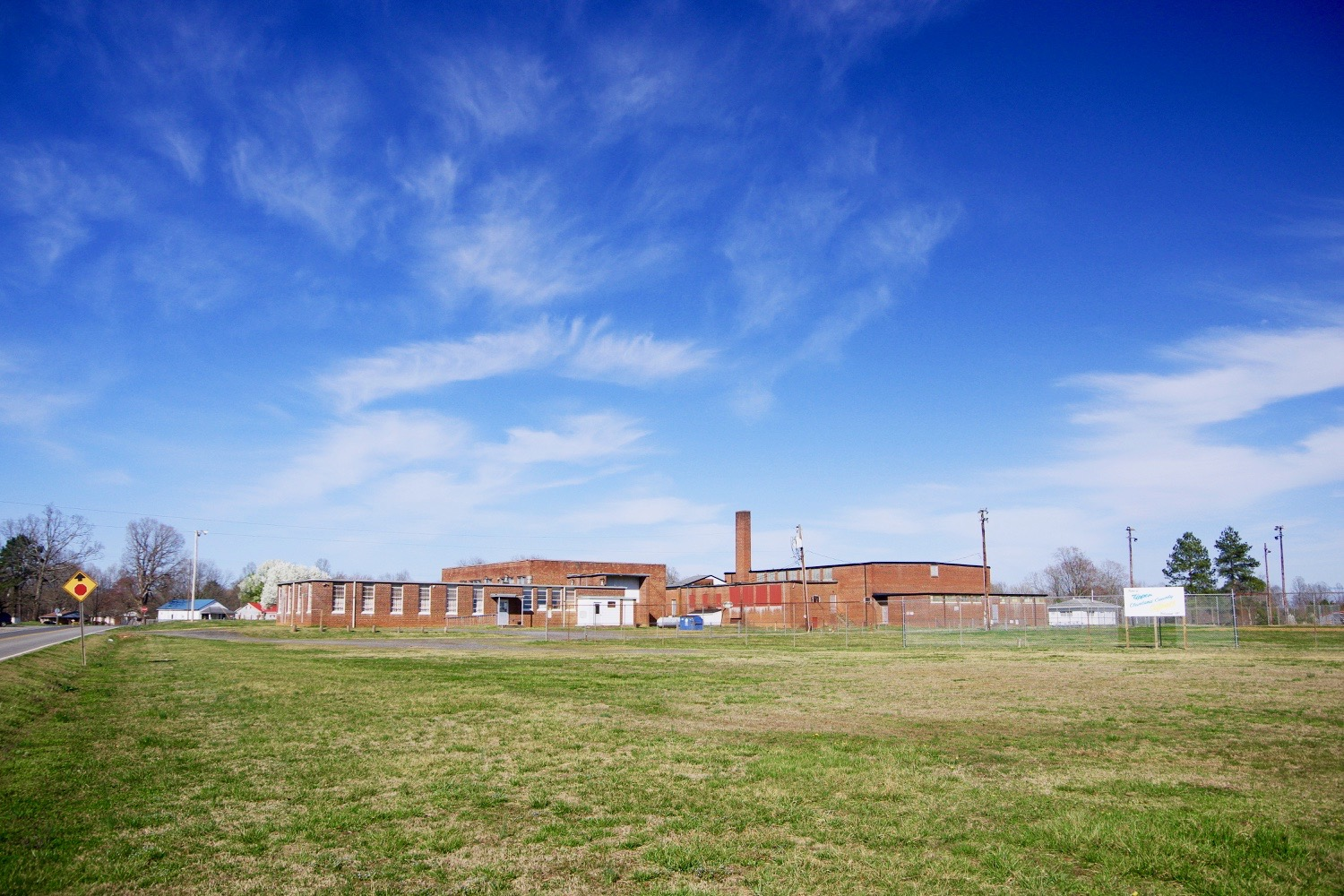
- Belwood Community Center

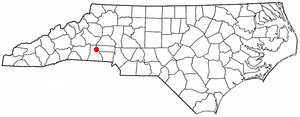
- Location of Belwood, North Carolina
- Coordinates: 35°28′46″N 81°31′22″W
- Country: United States
- State: North Carolina
- County: Cleveland

Area
  - Total: 12.31 sq mi (31.87 km^{2})
  - Land: 12.30 sq mi (31.85 km^{2})
  - Water: 0.0077 sq mi (0.02 km^{2})
- Elevation: 1,020 ft (310 m)

Population (2020)
  - Total: 857
  - Density: 69.7/sq mi (26.91/km^{2})
- Time zone: UTC-5 (Eastern (EST))
  - Summer (DST): UTC-4 (EDT)
- ZIP code: 28090
- Area code: 704
- FIPS code: 37-04960
- GNIS feature ID: 2405239

Belwood is a town in Cleveland County, North Carolina, United States. As of the 2020 census, Belwood had a population of 857.

== History ==
Belwood was incorporated in 1978. The name of the town means "beautiful woods."

== Geography ==
Belwood is located in northeastern Cleveland County. The northeast border of the town follows the county line, with Lincoln County to the east.

North Carolina Highway 18 (Fallston Road) passes through the town, leading south 14 miles (23 km) to Shelby, the county seat, and north 25 miles (40 km) to Morganton.

According to the United States Census Bureau, Belwood has a total area of 12.3 square miles (31.9 km^{2}), of which 0.008 square miles (0.02 km^{2}), or 0.05%, is water.

== Demographics ==
Historical population
Census	Pop.	Note	%±
1980	613		—
1990	631		2.9%
2000	962		52.5%
2010	950		−1.2%
2020	857		−9.8%
U.S. Decennial Census

=== 2020 census ===
Belwood racial composition
Race	Number	Percentage
White (non-Hispanic)	777	90.67%
Black or African American (non-Hispanic)	17	1.98%
Native American	2	0.23%
Asian	2	0.23%
Pacific Islander	2	0.23%
Other/Mixed	17	1.98%
Hispanic or Latino	40	4.67%

As of the 2020 United States census, there were 857 people, 349 households, and 251 families residing in the town.

=== 2000 census ===
As of the census of 2000, there were 962 people, 373 households, and 280 families residing in the town. The population density was 78.2 inhabitants per square mile (30.2/km^{2}). There were 410 housing units at an average density of 33.3 per square mile (12.9/km^{2}). The racial makeup of the town was 95.22% White, 3.85% African American, 0.10% Asian, 0.21% from other races, and 0.62% from two or more races. Hispanic or Latino of any race were 1.98% of the population.

There were 373 households, out of which 36.2% had children under the age of 18 living with them, 60.9% were married couples living together, 8.6% had a female householder with no husband present, and 24.7% were non-families. 22.3% of all households were made up of individuals, and 9.7% had someone living alone who was 65 years of age or older. The average household size was 2.58 and the average family size was 2.97.

In the town, the population was spread out, with 27.8% under the age of 18, 8.0% from 18 to 24, 28.8% from 25 to 44, 23.6% from 45 to 64, and 11.9% who were 65 years of age or older. The median age was 36 years. For every 100 females, there were 89.4 males. For every 100 females age 18 and over, there were 89.4 males.

The median income for a household in the town was $31,471, and the median income for a family was $40,417. Males had a median income of $30,139 versus $19,118 for females. The per capita income for the town was $14,323. About 9.5% of families and 13.2% of the population were below the poverty line, including 20.1% of those under the age of 18 and 7.9% of those aged 65 or over.
