= July 1989 Northeastern United States tornado outbreak =

1989 Northeastern United States tornado outbreak
- Damage to trees in Hamden, Connecticut

Meteorological history
- Duration: July 10, 1989

Tornado outbreak
- Tornadoes: 17 confirmed
- Max. rating: F4 tornado
- Duration: ~14 hours
- Highest winds: 90 mph (140 km/h) (Non-tornadic winds)
- Largest hail: 2.5 in (6.4 cm)

Overall effects
- Casualties: 0 fatalities (+1 non-tornadic), 150+ tornadic injuries
- Damage: >$154 million [1989 USD]
- Areas affected: Northeastern United States
- Part of the tornado outbreaks of 1989

A destructive series of tornadoes in damage struck the Northeastern United States on Monday July 10, 1989. The storm system affected five states with severe weather, including hail up to 2.5 inches (6.4 cm) across, thunderstorm winds up to 90 mph (140 km/h), and 17 tornadoes. Several towns in New York and Connecticut were particularly hard-hit. Several homes were leveled in Schoharie, New York, and extensive damage occurred in Bantam, Connecticut. A large section of Hamden, Connecticut, including an industrial park and hundreds of homes, was destroyed, and in some places, buildings were flattened to the ground.

The tornado outbreak injured more than 150 people, and straight-line thunderstorm winds killed one person. While tornado outbreaks in this area are unusual, this storm was especially rare in that it produced six significant tornadoes, including two violent F4 tornadoes and several long-tracked tornadoes.

== Storm details ==
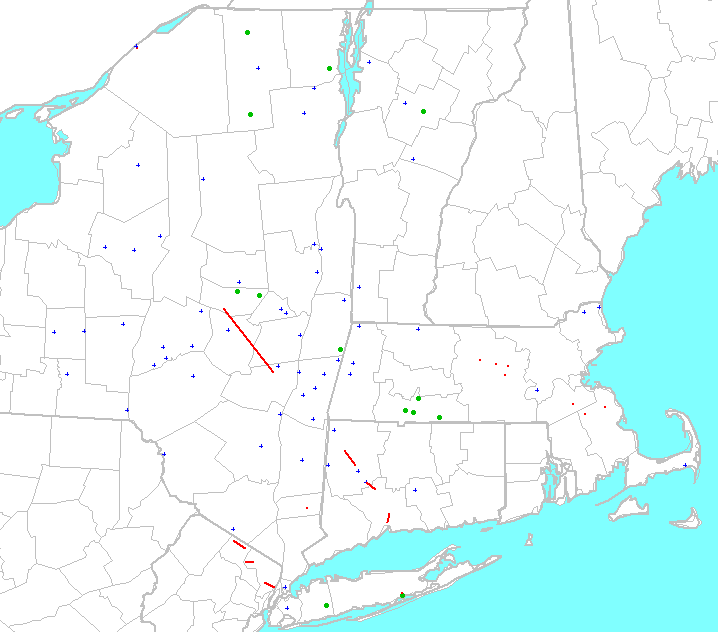
Severe weather reports, including hail, wind, and tornadoes, from that day.

Storms began causing damage early in the morning on July 10, 1989. A tornado briefly touched down in Ogdensburg, New York, at 5AM, injuring one person. Hail up to 1 in (25 mm) wide, wind gusts over 50 mph (80 km/h), and many reports of wind damage were reported in New York, Vermont, and Massachusetts before noon. Severe weather is unusual in the morning, and the activity only increases in severity towards the middle of the afternoon.

== List of confirmed tornadoes ==
Confirmed tornadoes by Fujita rating
FU	F0	F1	F2	F3	F4	F5	Total
0	4	7	4	0	2	0	17

=== July 10 event ===
F#	Location	County	Time (UTC)	Path length	Damage
New York
F1	NE of Ogdensburg	St. Lawrence County	1019	1.7 miles (2.7 km)	Tornado was ninety feet across. One injury was reported due to the tornado, with another attributed to winds due to the parent thunderstorm.
F4	Ames to near East Durham	Montgomery, Greene, Schoharie, Albany	1827	42 miles (68 km)	This was likely a family of tornadoes. The first and strongest tornado touched down near Ames, and caused damage in and around Bramerville, Carlisle, Howe Caverns, Central Bridge, and Schoharie before lifting. Worst damage occurred in the Schoharie area, where trees were downed, many barns and homes were damaged, and some were leveled. Another brief touchdown occurred near Rensselaerville, and a third occurred near Greenville.
F2	Near Carmel Hamlet	Putnam	2158	0.5 miles (0.8 km)	Condominiums had their roofs torn off. Five injuries were reported.
F2	Moriches	Suffolk	2315	0.2 miles (0.3 km)	Brief, but strong tornado touched down on Long Island. A trailer was thrown, injuring the occupant.
Massachusetts
F1	Hubbardston	Worcester	2004	0.3 miles (0.5 km)	Brief tornado.
F1	Princeton	Worcester	2010	0.3 miles (0.5 km)	Brief tornado.
F1	Sterling	Worcester	2010	0.3 miles (0.5 km)	Brief tornado.
F1	W of Boylston	Worcester	2015	0.4 miles (0.6 km)	Brief tornado.
F0	Canton	Norfolk	2110	0.1 miles (160 m)	Brief tornado.
F1	Near Brockton	Plymouth	2125	0.1 miles (160 m)	Brief tornado. One injury was reported.
F0	East of Hanover	Plymouth	2130	0.1 miles (160 m)	Brief tornado.
Connecticut
F2	Cornwall to near Morris	Litchfield	2040	10 miles (16 km)	Skipping tornado leveled a large swath of forest and destroyed ski-lifts near the beginning of the path before striking Milton, downing hundreds of trees there and blocking multiple roads. The tornado then severely damaged the small town of Bantam, tearing apart many homes and businesses in town. A church was destroyed and a soda machine was thrown 100 feet into the air at that location. Caused $5,000,000 in damage and injured four people.
F2	Watertown to northern Waterbury	Litchfield, New Haven	2115	5.0 miles (8.0 km)	Destructive tornado moved through Watertown, Oakville, and Waterbury, resulting in considerable damage at each location. 50 homes were unroofed or torn apart, and 100 others were damaged. A water treatment plant in Watertown lost a large section of its roof. Many trees and power lines were downed. Caused over $5,000,000 in damage and 70 injuries.
F4	Hamden	New Haven	2145	3.0 miles (4.8 km)	Violent tornado devastated the Highwood section of Hamden. Many homes, apartment buildings, and industrial buildings were badly damaged, and a few were leveled. Heavy construction equipment was tossed as well. A total of 350 homes and 40 businesses were destroyed. Hundreds of trees and power lines were downed, and tree damage took up to a year to clean up. Injured 40 people and caused at least $120,000,000 in damages.
New Jersey
F1	West Milford to Ringwood	Passaic	2300	4.5 miles (7.2 km)	Trees were snapped.
F0	Oakland to Franklin Lakes	Bergen	2319	3.5 miles (5.6 km)	Caused tree and house damage.
F0	Garfield to Fort Lee	Bergen	2346	4.0 miles (6.4 km)	Caused tree and house damage.
Sources: NCDC Storm Events Database "Significant Tornadoes 1680–1991" SPC Storm Data

=== Schoharie County tornado ===
Ames-East Durham, New York
F4 tornado
- on the Fujita scale

Overall effects
- Injuries: 20
- Damage: $20 million (1989 USD)

The event, which devastated areas from Montgomery to Greene County, caused $20,000,000 in damage and injured 20 people. While the Storm Prediction Center archives say it was a single tornado, it was likely three or more tornadoes, each producing F3 to F4 damage. Only damage near Schoharie was at the F4 level, and some sources doubt it even reached that intensity.

The first tornado touched down three miles east of Ames at 1:27PM, moving southeast. It passed near or through the towns of Carlisle, Howe Caverns, Central Bridge, and Schoharie before lifting. Continuing southeast for 10 miles, the storm produced another tornado briefly near Rensselaerville. After another 10 miles, a third tornado touched down between Greenville and Surprise. This final section of the path is plotted as a skipping tornado but may have been three or more tornadoes.

=== Connecticut tornado family ===
Connecticut tornado family
Tornado family
- Tornadoes: 3
- Max. rating: F4 tornado

Overall effects
- Casualties: 1 non-tornadic, 114 injuries
- Damage: $130 million (1989 USD)

An hour after the previous event destroyed in Upstate New York, a new tornado family began producing significant damage in the adjacent state of Connecticut. The first tornado, which may have been three tornadoes, started its path of destruction in Cornwall, leveling a virgin forest known as Cathedral Pines. At the nearby Mohawk Mountain Ski Area, every ski lift was destroyed, with some lift chairs found miles away. The tornado continued south-southeast through Milton, leveling hundreds more trees, and destroyed the village of Bantam before dissipating. Strong downburst winds continued to cause damage and level trees after this tornado lifted: it was during this period between tornadoes that a 12-year-old girl was killed by falling trees in Black Rock State Park.

Soon afterwards, another tornado touched down in Watertown, passing through Oakville and northern Waterbury, damaging or destroying 150 homes.

The Hamden tornado was by far the most destructive tornado of this family, possibly the most damaging of the outbreak. It touched down at 5:38 pm near the Wilbur Cross Parkway. Industrial cranes and cars were tossed through the air, and rows of houses and an industrial park were flattened. The tornado lifted just a few minutes later at 5:45. The damage path was only five miles long, stopping just short of the city of New Haven, but it damaged or destroyed almost 400 structures.

The storm was so intense at this point that an 80 mph (130 km/h) wind gust was measured in downtown New Haven after the tornado dissipated. At about the same time, a tornado struck the area between Carmel and Brewster, New York, unroofing a condominium complex. Five people were injured.

=== Long Island ===
Moriches, New York
F2 tornado
- on the Fujita scale

Overall effects
- Injuries: 1

The storms continued to produce damage after crossing onto Long Island. An F2 tornado caused significant damage in the town of East Moriches. A man was thrown with his trailer across an airfield; he escaped the destroyed trailer with only minor injuries. The tornado was accompanied by 2.5 inches (6.4 cm) hail. Other east areas also saw straight-line wind damage and hail up to an inch across.

=== Massachusetts storms ===
Massachusetts tornado family
Tornado family
- Tornadoes: 7
- Max. rating: F1 tornado

Overall effects
- Injuries: 1

While the destructive tornadoes affected Connecticut, this part of the storm produced four brief F1 tornadoes in quick succession north of Worcester, which occurred between 4PM and 4:15PM. These tornadoes each produced damage paths less than 150 feet (46 m) wide and less than 0.5 miles (0.80 km) long.

Moving east-southeast into southern Middlesex County, it continued producing severe winds (gusting up to 90 mph; 140 km/h) and hefty rain. Another tornado touched down very briefly in Norfolk County, followed by two more brief touchdowns in Plymouth County near 5:30PM. The storm then weakened but still managed to produce 60 mph (97 km/h) winds on Cape Cod before finally moving out into the Atlantic and dissipating.

=== New Jersey storms ===
New Jersey tornado family
Tornado family
- Tornadoes: 3
- Max. rating: F1 tornado

Overall effects
- Damage: $4 million (1989 USD)

Around the same time, the last of the activity was affecting areas of northern New Jersey. Two F0s and an F1 tracked through parts of Passaic and Bergen counties, snapping and uprooting trees, and causing $4 million in damage. About 150 houses were damaged in Bergen county alone.

== Aftermath ==
In Waterbury, Connecticut, Mayor Joseph Santopietro declared a state of emergency due to extensive damage in the city.

In Hamden, Connecticut, the National Guard was called in to aid in cleanup and keep order, as some looting was reported in the devastated area. President George H. W. Bush declared the area a disaster on July 18. The damage was so intense that much of the area was without power for a week, and trees were still being cleared a year later.

There was some damage to homes and other structures from this storm, but most damage was confined to wooded areas. Several major roads, including Route 9, Route 12, and Interstate 190, were closed due to flooding or downed trees. The main financial impact was damage to utilities, totaling over $2 million in Princeton alone.

Despite the extensive and widespread damage, only one death was reported from the entire severe weather outbreak, and this was due to straight-line winds, not a tornado. Many people, including Connecticut Governor William O'Neill, commented that it was "a miracle" that more people were not seriously injured or killed.

== Historic outbreak ==
This storm event was one of the most extensive in the Northeastern United States. In all, 17 tornadoes touched down, possibly more. There were 14 instances of measured severe winds (several over 80 mph (130 km/h), along with 46 reports of straight-line wind damage. There were 10 reports of hail 1 inch (2.5 cm) across or larger, and hail 2.5 inches (6.4 cm) wide fell from one storm, producing a tornado. Hail this large is especially rare in this area of the United States.

Remarkably, though hundreds of homes and other structures were leveled, no one was killed by tornadoes that day. Tornado damage caused about 140 injuries, mostly minor, and one death and 11 injuries were caused by wind damage. In just five hours, the storms produced more than 12,500 lightning strikes. The airport in Oxford, Connecticut, recorded 4.4 inches (110 mm) of rain in just 30 minutes. While the northeastern United States experiences occasional tornadoes, an event of this scale is especially rare. Typical tornadoes in this area are short-lived and not particularly damaging. This outbreak featured several long-lived tornadoes, produced by storms that produced destructive straight-line winds over a large area. Since 1950, only six violent tornadoes have occurred in the Northeastern US, two of which were part of this outbreak. It was by far the worst tornado event in the area since May 2, 1983, when six significant tornadoes tore through New York.

== See also ==
- Flint-Worcester tornado outbreak sequence
- List of Connecticut tornadoes
- Late-May 1998 tornado outbreak and derecho
- List of North American tornadoes and tornado outbreaks
- List of New Jersey tornadoes
