= Brownsboro, Alabama =

- Unincorporated community
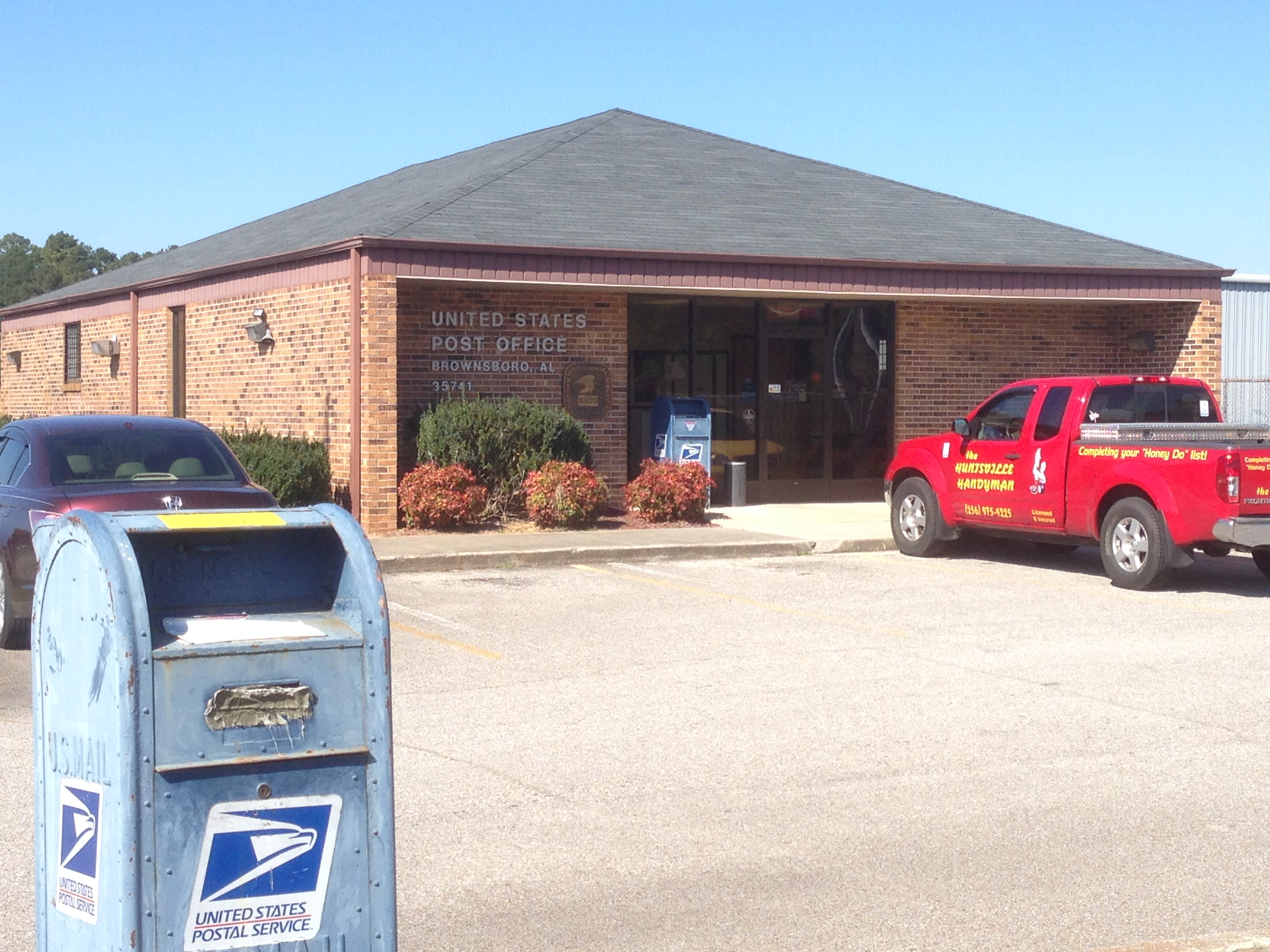
- Post office in Brownsboro

- Location within Alabama Location within the United States
- Coordinates: 34°44′57″N 86°26′35″W
- Country: United States
- State: Alabama
- County: Madison
- Elevation: 620 ft (190 m)
- Time zone: UTC-6 (Central (CST))
  - Summer (DST): UTC-5 (CDT)
- ZIP code: 35741
- Area code: 256
- GNIS feature ID: 115022

Brownsboro is an unincorporated community in Madison County, Alabama, United States. The Flint River passes through the town and floods periodically.

== History ==
Brownsboro is named after a local miller, John Brown. A post office was established at Brownsboro in 1824.

== Notable person ==
- John Stallworth, professional American football player, four times Super Bowl champion (IX, X, XIII, XIV).
