= Allentown High School =

High school in Monmouth County, New Jersey, US

Location
- 27 High Street; Allentown, Monmouth County, New Jersey 08501; United States; 40.174416°N 74.587791°W

Information
- Type: Public high school
- Established: 1924
- School district: Upper Freehold Regional School District
- NCES School ID: 341656004124
- Principal: Todd Pae
- Faculty: 75.4 FTEs
- Grades: 9-12
- Enrollment: 1,033 (as of 2024–25)
- Student to teacher ratio: 13.7:1
- Colors: Red and Black
- Athletics conference: Colonial Valley Conference
- Team name: Redbirds
- Website: www.ufrsd.net/o/ahs

Allentown High School is a four-year public high school serving students in ninth through twelfth grades from three communities in Monmouth County, in the U.S. state of New Jersey, operating as part of the Upper Freehold Regional School District. The school enrolls students from Allentown Borough and Upper Freehold Township. Students from Millstone Township attend through a sending/receiving relationship with the Millstone Township Schools. The school has been accredited by the Middle States Association of Colleges and Schools Commission on Elementary and Secondary Schools since 1959.

As of the 2024–25 school year, the school had an enrollment of 1,033 students and 75.4 classroom teachers (on an FTE basis), for a student–teacher ratio of 13.7:1. There were 57 students (5.5% of enrollment) eligible for free lunch and 8 (0.8% of students) eligible for reduced-cost lunch.

The district participates in the Interdistrict Public School Choice Program at Allentown High School, having been approved on November 2, 1999, as one of the first ten districts statewide to participate in the program. Seats in the program for non-resident students are specified by the district and are allocated by lottery, with tuition paid for participating students by the New Jersey Department of Education.

== History ==
The high school opened in September 1924 for students in grades 7-12, having been built for $80,000 (equivalent to $1.5 million in 2025). The current school facility opened in September 1964, replacing a building that was operating at more than double its capacity of 300 students. Constructed at a cost of $1.4 million (equivalent to $14.5 million in 2025), the school served students from the constituent districts of Allenton and Upper Freehold Township, along with those from Plumsted Township and Washington Township (since renamed as Robbinsville Township), who attended as part of a sending/receiving relationships.

Approximately 400 students from Plumsted Township had attended the high school as part of the sending/receiving relationship with the Plumsted Township School District prior to the passage of a referendum under which New Egypt High School was opened in September 2001 with an initial class of 100 students in ninth grade.

In 1981, the Washington Township district (since renamed as the Robbinsville Public School District) filed a petition with the New Jersey State Board of Education seeking to terminate their sending agreement, noting that the departure of students from Washington Township would not adversely impact the racial balance at Allentown High School. After receiving approval, starting in the 1990-91 school year, students from Washington Township, began attending Lawrence High School, under which all of the township's students would leave Allentown High School by the end of the 1993-94 school year.

== Awards, recognition, and rankings ==
The school was the 125th-ranked public high school in New Jersey out of 339 schools statewide in New Jersey Monthly magazine's September 2014 cover story on the state's "Top Public High Schools," using a new ranking methodology. The school had been ranked 135th in the state of 328 schools in 2012, after being ranked 82nd in 2010 out of 322 schools listed. The magazine ranked the school 90th in 2008 out of 316 schools. The school was also ranked 103rd in the magazine's September 2006 issue, which surveyed 316 schools across the state. Schooldigger.com ranked the school tied for 175th out of 381 public high schools statewide in its 2011 rankings (a decrease of 37 positions from the 2010 ranking) which were based on the combined percentage of students classified as proficient or above proficient on the mathematics (81.1%) and language arts literacy (92.5%) components of the High School Proficiency Assessment (HSPA).

In its listing of "America's Best High Schools 2016", the school was ranked 226th out of 500 best high schools in the country; it was ranked 36th among all high schools in New Jersey and 19th among the state's non-magnet schools.

In its 2013 report on "America's Best High Schools", The Daily Beast ranked the school 675th in the nation among participating public high schools and 52nd among schools in New Jersey.

== Athletics ==
The Allentown High School Redbirds compete in the Colonial Valley Conference, which is comprised of public and private high schools located in Mercer, Middlesex and Monmouth counties, operating under the supervision of the New Jersey State Interscholastic Athletic Association (NJSIAA). With 824 students in grades 10-12, the school was classified by the NJSIAA for the 2022–24 school years as Group III Central for most athletic competition purposes. The football team competes in the Valley Division of the 94-team West Jersey Football League superconference The school was classified by the NJSIAA as Group III South for football for 2024–2026, which included schools with 695 to 882 students.

The school participates in joint cooperative ice hockey and boys / girls swimming teams with Robbinsville High School as the host school / lead agency. These co-op programs operate under agreements scheduled to expire at the end of the 2023–24 school year.

The girls' field hockey team won the Central Jersey Group II state sectional championship in 1997, 2003, 2004 and 2005, and won the Central Jersey Group III title in 2013. The team was Group II co-champion in 1997 with West Essex High School. Against a program that had won eight previous state titles, the 1997 team stayed even with West Essex at 2-2 after regulation and three overtime periods to be declared as co-champion in Group II and finish the season with a 14-game unbeaten streak and a 22-1-1 record. The 2003 field hockey won the Central, Group II sectional championship, edging Shore Regional High School 3–2 in the tournament final. The 2004 team repeated the championship, defeating Cinnaminson High School 2–0.

The 2003 girls' tennis team won the Central, Group II title with a 3–2 win over Shore Regional High School.

In 2006, the girls' softball won the Central, Group II sectional championship over John F. Kennedy Memorial High School, by a 3–0 final score. The team moved on to finish the season with a record of 23-4 after winning the NJSIAA Group II state championship, topping Pascack Valley High School in the finals by a score of 11–1 in five innings, under the mercy rule.

The baseball team won the Group II state championship in 2008 (defeating runner-up Mahwah High School in the playoff finals) and won the Group III title in 2017 (vs. Cranford High School). The 2008 team won the Group II title with an 1106 win against Mahwah in the championship game.

The boys soccer team won the Group III state title in 2013 as co-champion with Northern Highlands Regional High School.

The football team won the Central Jersey Group IV state sectional championship in 2016. Allentown defeated Brick Township High School by a score of 41–6 in the tournament final against Brick Township High School. The 2010 football team won the program's first division title, finishing with a record of 6–4. Their biggest win in school history at the time, which also happened in this season, came from defeating Trenton Central High School, the final score was 74–44. In 2015, the football team broke the school record for points in a game, defeating West Windsor-Plainsboro High School North by 81–56, in a game in which quarterback Jordan Winston had 354 rushing yards on 24 carries, and went 4 for 6 for 93 yards. In 2016 the team won the program's first championship, winning the Central Jersey Group IV state sectional title with a 41–6 win against Brick Township High School in the tournament final.

In 2017, the girls' soccer team went 22–1, winning the Central Jersey Group III state sectional championship, the program's first, over Toms River High School East by a score of 2–1. They then went on to win the Group III state title over Middletown High School South in the playoff finals by a score of 2–1. These state titles are the first and only in the girls' soccer program at the high school. The team was also named Area Team of the Year by NJ.com.

In 2018, the NJSIAA sanctioned girls wrestling and state championships were held in 2019. Jasmine Aizley, the first and only female wrestler on the team, qualified in the inaugural 2018-2019 and also the 2019–2020 seasons, her junior and senior year. She was the team's first female captain, region finalist and champion, and placed fourth and second in the state championships.

== Student life ==
The classes feature block scheduling. The third block is split into four lunch periods.

After paying a fee, eleventh and twelfth grade students are given the privilege to drive their cars to school and park in assigned spots. Twelfth grade students park in the parking lot at the back of the school, while eleventh grade students park their cars at the adjoining Byron Johnson Recreation Area parking lot.

== Extracurricular activities ==
=== Marching band ===
The Allentown High School marching band, currently directed by Ross Hecht, has received recognition over the years, including winners of the 2000, 2003, 2008 and 2009 USSBA marching band All-State Finals competitions. The percussion section of the band has won the award for Best Percussion at All-State Finals in 2007, 2008, 2009, 2014, and 2015. The band has gone on to winning many other awards and appearances, such as the St. Patrick's Day Parade on New York City's Fifth Avenue. The band enjoyed back-to-back victories in New York in 1990 and 1991, then five in a row from 1999 to 2003. Meanwhile, the band repeated their performance in Philadelphia's parade, winning in 1990–93, 1999–2000, and 2005–06. In 2018 the marching band won Group IV A 2018 State Champions( New Jersey). In 2021 the Marching band also won Group ll A 2021 National Champions at Nationals held in Allentown, Pennsylvania. The following the Marching band had an undefeated season winning both States and Nationals which was held at Metlife Stadium. As well as the best guard in the state in 2022.

=== FIRST Robotics Team ===
Allentown High School is home to FIRST Robotics Competition Team 1807, Redbird Robotics. They are completely student run Redbird Robotics that has an active roster of 56 students on the team. 1807 does a large amount of local outreach, including running a STEM Club for Stone Bridge Middle School and robot demonstrations. Their motto is ‘Simple. Robust. Reliable.’Redbird Robotics.

Since its rookie year in 2006, Redbird Robotics has accepted such honors as the 2006 New Jersey Star Award, the 2007 Regional Motorola Quality Award, and the 2009 New York City Regional Underwriters Laboratory Safety Award and Regional Champion. The team also qualified for and attended the 2006 and 2009 FIRST Championship in Atlanta. In 2017, Redbird Robotics won the FIRST Robotics Mid-Atlantic Regional Competition. As a result, the team moved forward to the World Championships in St. Louis, Missouri. In 2018, Team 1807 won the FIRST Dean’s List Finalist Award and the Imagery Award. In 2019, Team 1807 continued their performance by winning the FMA Bensalem Event, becoming two-time event finalist winners. With the 2019 season came more awards like the Excellence in Engineering Award, which was won again in 2021, 2022, 2023, and 2024, along with the Industrial Design Award. They followed this by placing 4th in the FMA Seneca District Event and 3rd in the Mid-Atlantic District Championship and the FMA Bensalem District Event in 2019.

Due to their success, the team was asked to participate in IRI, Indiana Robotics Invitational. In 2022, Redbird Robotics became three-time Event Finalists this season and won their second Entrepreneurship Award. In 2023 and 2024, Redbird Robotics won the Excellence in Engineering Award, the FMA Seneca Event, the Creativity Award twice in 2023, with the Engineering Inspiration Award and became one of the Event Finalists. In 2023, Redbird Robotics consistently placed in the top 5 in events such as the FMA District Montgomery, and the FMA Mid-Atlantic District Championships. In that same season, team 1807 ran their own FMA event in Allentown, New Jersey.

In 2026, 1807 was well-known for their defense. 1807 competed in the Seneca event as the first pick of Alliance 6. In the Bensalem Event, the team competed in the playoffs as the first pick of Alliance 4 and also won The Industrial Design Award. In the Mid-Atlantic District Championship, 1807 joined as the second pick Alliance 6 to finish as District Championship finalists in an upset. They also won the Creativity Award at the same event, overall bringing them to the World Championship in Houston for the eighth consecutive time. In October of 2026, Redbird Robotics was first pick of Alliance 8 and got eliminated in the double elimination bracket.

Henry Williams’ 1877 Feathering Paddlewheel for Steamboats: A mechanical design model built to improve steamboat propulsion efficiency

Obama Patent Models

John Peer’s 1874 Gear-Cutting Machine: An intricate mechanical model used for precision gear cutting.

Redbird Robotics had the opportunity to create two 1:1 replicas of patent models to be put on display in the Oval Office recreation at the Obama Presidential Center in Chicago, Illinois. Kubik-Maltbie, a firm that designs museum experiences worldwide, asked 1807 to create historical patent models once displayed in President Obama’s Oval Office. The two models 1807 created are John Peer’s 1874 Gear-Cutting Machine (Mechanical model for precision gear cutting) and Henry Williams’ 1877 Feathering Paddlewheel (Model built to increase steamboat efficiency.)

By the fall of 2025, 1807 designed, built, and delivered the completed models to Kubik. As of 2026, 1807’s models are permanently housed for public display in the Obama Presidential Center & Library.

== Administration ==
The school's principal is Todd Pae. His administration team includes two vice principals and the athletic director. In August 2022, Pae succeeded Constance DeNicola Embley, who had served as the principal from 1999 to 2022.

== Notable alumni ==
- Irwin Lachman (born 1930), one of the inventors of the catalytic converter
- Ross Scheuerman (born 1993), running back for the Hamilton Tiger-Cats of the Canadian Football League
