= Ashby Creek =

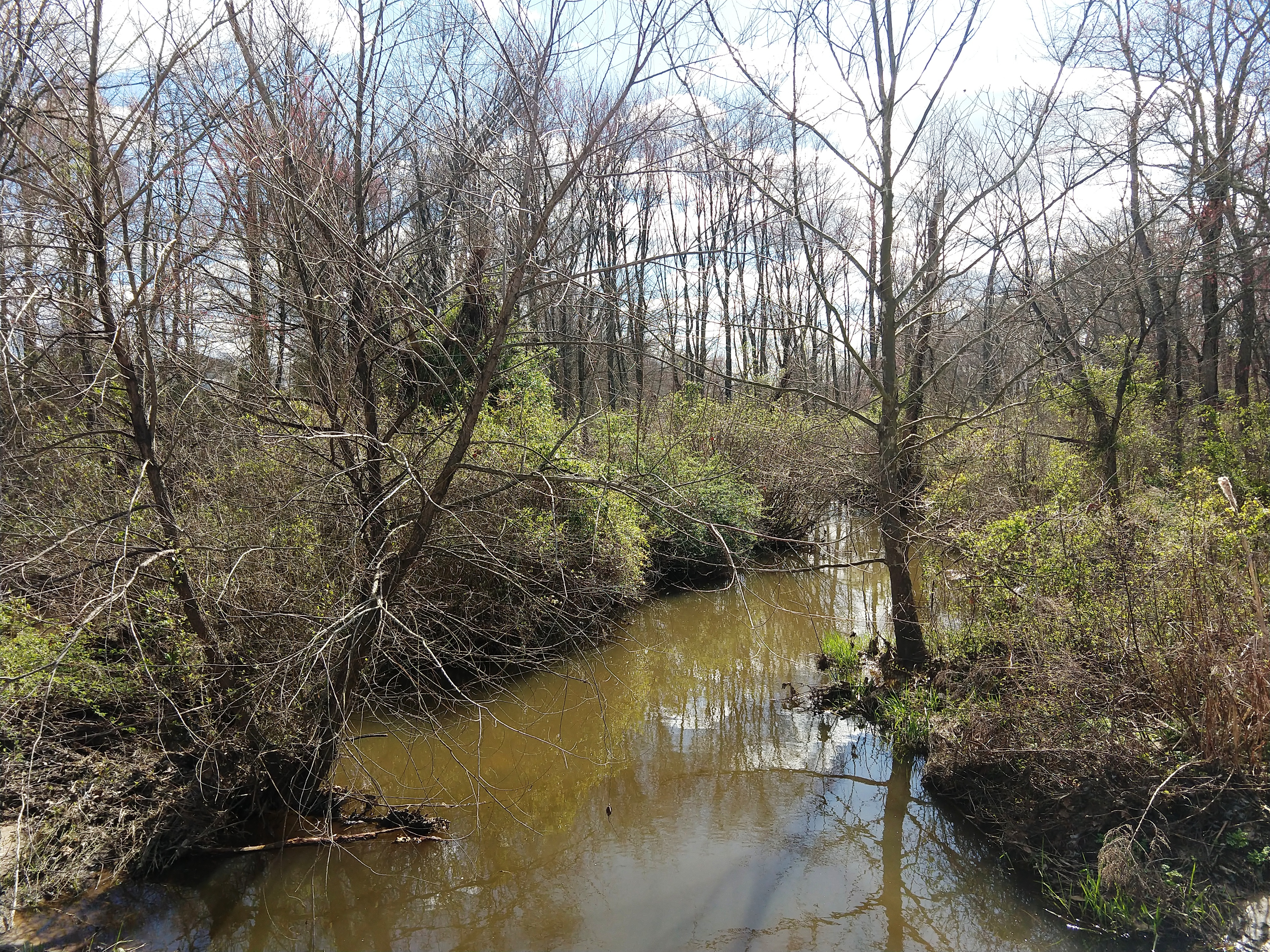
- Looking downstream / south from CR 526

Location
- Country: United States

Physical characteristics
- Source
  - coordinates: 40.1813447°N 74.5150226°W
- Mouth
  - coordinates: 40.1708140°N 74.5778350°W
  - elevation: 66 ft (20 m)
- Length: 4.2 mi (6.8 km)

Basin features
- Progression: Doctors Creek, Crosswicks Creek, Delaware River, Atlantic Ocean
- River system: Delaware River system

Ashby Creek is a tributary of Doctors Creek in Upper Freehold Township, Monmouth County, New Jersey, in the United States. It runs for 4.2 miles (6.8 km) from the area near Wrightsville and empties into Doctors Creek southeast of Allentown.

== Course ==
From its mouth near Wrightsville within Upper Freehold Township, the creek briefly heads west through farmland, then south into a wooded area where it crosses under Interstate 195 (I-195) west of its interchange 11. The creek is impounded forming an unnamed lake before continuing west through woods and farmland staying just to the south of I-195. It passes under the Union Transportation Trail (formerly the Pemberton and Hightstown Railroad) and Sharon Station Road. Continuing to wind towards the west through farmland, it is again impounded within an unnamed lake between a farm and small residences. Downstream of this dam, the creek passes under Allentown-Lakewood Road (County Route 526) then continuing southwest through woods situated between two housing developments. Ashby Creek flows into Doctors Creek about 0.7 miles (1.1 km) southeast of downtown Allentown.

== Name ==
The creek had been known as Negro Run or a variation of that since the 1700s. The name may have been intended to honor fugitive slaves who passed through the area on the Underground Railroad. It was also known as Nigger Run by the 1800s. It was noted as Nigger Run on the Allentown United States Geological Survey topographic map by 1948, but had been officially renamed to Negro Run in 1957, around the time other similarly offensive names were changed by the United States Board on Geographic Names (BGN).

In the 1990s, a local resident submitted several proposals to change the name of Negro Run to Martin Luther King Jr. Creek or Freedom Creek. The change were opposed by local residents and governments, wanting to keep the more historical name. Historic research found that George Ashby (1844–1946), a black farmer who had served in the Union Army during the American Civil War, lived and worked near the creek. Ashby was also New Jersey's last surviving Civil War veteran. Following the creation of a park in Allentown in 2016, a local resident launched an online petition drive to rename the creek for Ashby. Though some opposition still existed from local historic societies and the Upper Freehold Township council, the BGN Domestic Naming Committee at their November 2018 meeting voted 11–1 to rename the creek to Ashby Creek.

== See also ==
- List of rivers of New Jersey
