= Kinkora =

Kinkora may refer to:

- Kinkora, Prince Edward Island, Canada
  - Kinkora Regional High School
- Kinkora, New Jersey
- Kinkora (crater)
- Kinkora-Pemberton rail-trail

== See also ==
- Borden-Kinkora
