= Upper Freehold Regional School District =

School district in Monmouth County, New Jersey, US

Address
- 27 High Street Allentown, Monmouth County, New Jersey, 08501; United States
- Coordinates: 40.174416°N 74.587791°W

District information
- Grades: PreK-12
- Superintendent: Mark Guterl
- Business administrator: Nicole Petrone
- Schools: 3

Students and staff
- Enrollment: 2,124 (as of 2021–22)
- Faculty: 176.2 FTEs
- Student–teacher ratio: 12.1:1

Other information
- District Factor Group: GH
- Website: www.ufrsd.net
Ind.	Per pupil	District spending	Rank (*)	K-12 average	%± vs. average
1A	Total Spending	$18,158	35	$18,891	−3.9%
1	Budgetary Cost	13,485	30	14,783	−8.8%
2	Classroom Instruction	7,927	27	8,763	−9.5%
6	Support Services	2,330	47	2,392	−2.6%
8	Administrative Cost	1,298	12	1,485	−12.6%
10	Operations & Maintenance	1,554	29	1,783	−12.8%
13	Extracurricular Activities	377	30	268	40.7%
Data from NJDoE 2014 Taxpayers' Guide to Education Spending. *Of K-12 districts with 1,800-3,500 students. Lowest spending=1; Highest=68

The Upper Freehold Regional School District is a regional public school district in Monmouth County, in the U.S. state of New Jersey, which provides educational services to students in pre-kindergarten through twelfth grade from Allentown Borough and Upper Freehold Township. Millstone Township sends students to the district's high school as part of a sending/receiving relationship with the Millstone Township Schools.

As of the 2021–22 school year, the district, comprising three schools, had an enrollment of 2,124 students and 176.2 classroom teachers (on an FTE basis), for a student–teacher ratio of 12.1:1.

The district is classified by the New Jersey Department of Education as being in District Factor Group "GH", the third-highest of eight groupings. District Factor Groups organize districts statewide to allow comparison by common socioeconomic characteristics of the local districts. From lowest socioeconomic status to highest, the categories are A, B, CD, DE, FG, GH, I and J.

The district participates in the Interdistrict Public School Choice Program at Allentown High School, having been approved on November 2, 1999, as one of the first ten districts statewide to participate in the program. Seats in the program for non-resident students are specified by the district and are allocated by lottery, with tuition paid for participating students by the New Jersey Department of Education.

== History ==
Students from Plumsted Township had attended the district's high school as part of a sending/receiving relationship with the Plumsted Township School District prior to the passage of a referendum under which New Egypt High School was opened in September 2001 with an initial class of 100 students in ninth grade.

== Schools ==
Schools in the district (with 2021–22 enrollment data from the National Center for Education Statistics) are:

- Newell Elementary School with 516 students in grades PreK-4
  - Kelly Huggins, principal
- Stone Bridge Middle School with 460 students in grades 5-8
  - Stefanie Folino, principal
- Allentown High School with 1,131 students in grades 9-12
  - Todd Pae, principal

== Administration ==
Core members of the district's administration are:

- Mark Guterl, superintendent
- Nicole Petrone, business administrator and board secretary

== Board of education ==
The district's board of education, comprised of nine members, sets policy and oversees the fiscal and educational operation of the district through its administration. As a Type II school district, the board's trustees are elected directly by voters to serve three-year terms of office on a staggered basis, with three seats up for election each year held (since 2012) as part of the November general election. The board appoints a superintendent to oversee the district's day-to-day operations and a business administrator to supervise the business functions of the district. The nine seats are allocated to the two constituent municipalities based on population, with five assigned to Upper Freehold Township and four to Allentown. A tenth member is appointed by Millstone Township to represent that district on the Upper Freehold Board of Education.
