= Plumsted Township School District =

School district in Ocean County, New Jersey, US

Address
- 131 Evergreen Road New Egypt, Ocean County, New Jersey, 08533; United States
- Coordinates: 40.079825°N 74.532119°W

District information
- Grades: PreK-12
- Superintendent: David Ytreboe
- Business administrator: Sean Gately
- Schools: 3

Students and staff
- Enrollment: 1,192 (as of 2024–25)
- Faculty: 95.2 FTEs
- Student–teacher ratio: 12.5:1

Other information
- District Factor Group: DE
- Website: www.newegypt.us
Ind.	Per pupil	District spending	Rank (*)	K-12 average	%± vs. average
1A	Total Spending	$17,880	26	$18,891	−5.4%
1	Budgetary Cost	13,234	17	14,783	−10.5%
2	Classroom Instruction	7,752	20	8,763	−11.5%
6	Support Services	2,046	27	2,392	−14.5%
8	Administrative Cost	1,495	13	1,485	0.7%
10	Operations & Maintenance	1,390	10	1,783	−22.0%
13	Extracurricular Activities	531	34	268	98.1%
16	Median Teacher Salary	57,680	18	64,043
Data from NJDoE 2014 Taxpayers' Guide to Education Spending. *Of K-12 districts with up to 1,800 students. Lowest spending=1; Highest=49

The Plumsted Township School District is a comprehensive community public school district that educates students in pre-kindergarten through twelfth grade from Plumsted Township, in Ocean County, in the U.S. state of New Jersey.

As of the 2024–25 school year, the district, comprised of three schools, had an enrollment of 1,192 students and 95.2 classroom teachers (on an FTE basis), for a student–teacher ratio of 12.5:1.

== History ==
Plumsted Township voters approved a December 1997 referendum under which $16.5 million would be borrowed to build new school facilities, while the existing middle school would be converted for use as a high school. Later that month, the commissioner of Education approved the withdrawal, as the feasibility study prepared showed no negative financial impact to either district and would not substantially impact the racial makeup of the students enrolled at Allentown High School. The high school opened its doors in September 1999 and admitted 100 ninth-graders who would graduate in spring 2003, ending a sending/receiving relationship that had existed for more than 50 years with the Upper Freehold Regional School District under which students from the township attended Allentown High School.

The district had been classified by the New Jersey Department of Education as being in District Factor Group "DE", the fifth-highest of eight groupings. District Factor Groups organize districts statewide to allow comparison by common socioeconomic characteristics of the local districts. From lowest socioeconomic status to highest, the categories are A, B, CD, DE, FG, GH, I and J.

== Schools ==
Schools in the district (with 2024–25 enrollment data from the National Center for Education Statistics) are:

Elementary schools

- New Egypt Primary School with 177 students in grades PreK–K
- Dr. Gerald H. Woehr Elementary School with 490 students in grades 1–6
  - Robert Cilmi, principal

High school

- New Egypt High School with 509 students in grades 7–12
  - Ashley Walulak, principal

== Administration ==
Core members of the district's administration are:

- David Ytreboe, superintendent
- Sean Gately, business administrator and board secretary

== Board of education ==
The district's board of education, comprised of seven members, sets policy and oversees the fiscal and educational operation of the district through its administration. As a Type II school district, the board's trustees are elected directly by voters to serve three-year terms of office on a staggered basis, with either two or three seats up for election each year held (since 2012) as part of the November general election. The board appoints a superintendent to oversee the district's day-to-day operations and a business administrator to supervise the business functions of the district.
