= Sharon, New Jersey =

Populated place in Monmouth County, New Jersey, US

- Unincorporated community
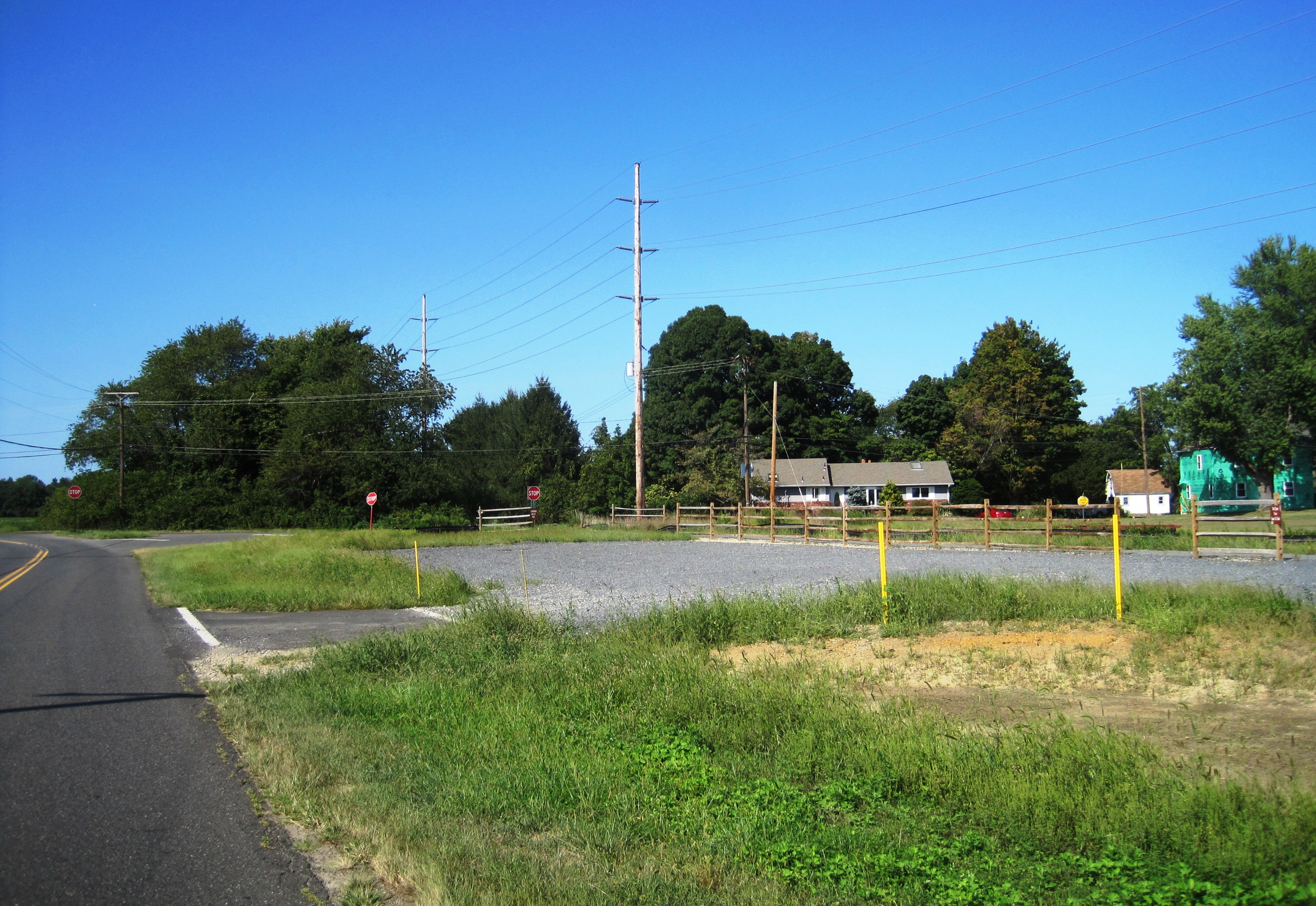

- Location of Sharon in Monmouth County Inset: Location of county within the state of New Jersey Sharon (New Jersey) Sharon (the United States)
- Coordinates: 40°12′23″N 74°32′10″W
- Country: United States
- State: New Jersey
- County: Monmouth
- Township: Upper Freehold
- Elevation: 118 ft (36 m)
- Time zone: UTC−05:00 (Eastern (EST))
  - Summer (DST): UTC−04:00 (EDT)
- GNIS feature ID: 880506

Sharon is an unincorporated community located within Upper Freehold Township in Monmouth County, in the U.S. state of New Jersey. Located at the intersection of Herbert Road and Sharon Station Road, the settlement is the site of a former stop on the Pemberton and Hightstown Railroad. Except for a few single-family homes in the area, most of the area is farmland. The railroad has since been abandoned and is being converted to the Union Transportation Trail, a rail trail. Sharon is the current northern terminus of the trail.

== See also ==
- New Sharon, New Jersey – nearby settlement
