= Hornerstown =

Hornerstown may refer to:

- Hornerstown, New Jersey
- Hornerstown Formation
