= When I Was 17 =

- Country of origin: United States
- Original language: English
- No. of seasons: 3
- No. of episodes: 56

Production
- Running time: 30 minutes
- Production company: MTV Productions

Original release
- Network: MTV
- Release: May 1, 2010 – November 19, 2011

When I Was 17 is a MTV television series. It featured celebrities of today and looked back on "when they were 17" with pictures as well as interviews with family and friends. Celebrities on the show include Kelly Rowland, Queen Latifah, Donald Trump, Khloé Kardashian, Drake, singer Trey Songz and internet star Perez Hilton.

== Topics covered ==
The show talked about events that led to their present-day career. Other topics included high school and, if applicable, college, love interests, uh-oh moments, traveling, fashion, and adventures.

== Episodes ==
=== Season 1 (May 1 to October 23, 2010) ===
- Episode 1. Khloé Kardashian, Perez Hilton & Trey Songz
- Episode 2. Ludacris, Jillian Michaels & Pete Wentz
- Episode 3. Drake, Jennie Finch & Queen Latifah
- Episode 4. Kevin Jonas, Katharine McPhee & Bret Michaels
- Episode 5. Kourtney Kardashian, Travis McCoy & Kris Allen
- Episode 6. Evan Lysacek, Kimberly Caldwell & Gabe Saporta
- Episode 7. Nick Cannon, Aubrey O'Day & Donald Trump
- Episode 8. Vanessa Minnillo, Chris Paul & Pitbull
- Episode 9. Johnny Weir, Jackson Rathbone & Keri Hilson
- Episode 10. Nicole "Snooki" Polizzi, James Van Der Beek & Pharrell Williams
- Episode 11. Ciara, CC Sabathia & Debi Nova
- Episode 12. Jennifer Farley, Paul DelVecchio & Michael Sorrentino
- Episode 13. Holly Madison, Dwyane Wade & Benji Madden and Joel Madden
- Episode 14. Adam Levine, Kathy Griffin & Swizz Beatz
- Episode 15. Kelly Rowland, Enrique Iglesias & Stephanie Pratt
- Episode 16. Jason Derulo, Jordin Sparks & 3OH!3
- Episode 17. Kendra Wilkinson, Kelly Osbourne & Asher Roth
- Episode 18. Usher, Ne-Yo & B.o.B
- Episode 19. Joey Lawrence, Rutina Wesley & Big Boi
- Episode 20. Kristin Chenoweth, Jay Sean & Soulja Boy
- Episode 21. Best of #1
- Episode 22. Best of #2
- Episode 23. Best of #3

=== Season 2 (October 30, 2010 to May 14, 2011) ===
- Episode 24. Nelly, Karina Smirnoff & Joanna Garcia
- Episode 25. Akon, Kerry Washington & Donald Glover
- Episode 26. Angelina Pivarnick, Nigel Barker & Nikki Blonsky
- Episode 27. Melissa Joan Hart, Flo Rida & Alison Sweeney
- Episode 28. Carmelo Anthony, Taye Diggs & Naya Rivera
- Episode 29. Audrina Patridge, Miss J. Alexander, & Cee Lo Green
- Episode 30. Vinny Guadagnino, Ronnie Ortiz-Magro & Sammi Giancola
- Episode 31. Kobe Bryant, Brooklyn Decker & Candice Accola
- Episode 32. Jenna Ushkowitz, Patrick Stump & Deena Nicole Cortese
- Episode 33. Topher Grace, Anna Faris, & Dan Fogler
- Episode 34. Bam Margera, Kat Graham, & Olivia Munn
- Episode 35. Brandy, Jay Manuel, & Derek Hough
- Episode 36. Rob Kardashian, Padma Lakshmi & Wendy Williams
- Episode 37. Wiz Khalifa, Mark Ballas & Elizabeth Berkley
- Episode 38. Lupe Fiasco, Jessie J & Tyrese Gibson
- Episode 39. Brittany Snow, Ashley Benson & La La Anthony
- Episode 40. Ashley Fink, Jeremih & Shay Mitchell
- Episode 41. Best of Prom
- Episode 42. Questlove, Christina Perri & Vanessa Simmons
- Episode 43. Jordan Knight, Tristan Wilds & Shane West
- Episode 44. Joe Jonas, Chris Brown & Selita Ebanks

=== Season 3 (August 20 to November 19, 2011) ===
- Episode 45. Colbie Caillat, Bow Wow & Christopher Mintz-Plasse
- Episode 46. Tyler, The Creator, Kreayshawn & Big Sean
- Episode 47. Amy Lee, Chris Klein & Theophilus London
- Episode 48. Steve-O, Paris Hilton & Miguel
- Episode 49. Heidi Klum, Wyclef Jean & Ashley Rickards
- Episode 50. Jamie Foxx, Tia and Tamera Mowry & Chris Bosh
- Episode 51. Tyra Banks, Mario Lopez & Anthony Mackie
- Episode 52. Lenny Kravitz, Kristin Cavallari & Bryan Greenberg
- Episode 53. Mark Hoppus, Sean Kingston & Tiffani Thiessen
- Episode 54. AnnaLynne McCord, Estelle & Mike Posner
- Episode 55. Robyn, Chad Michael Murray & J. Cole
- Episode 56. Common, T-Pain & Alex Meraz
