= Union Transportation Trail =

Rail trail in Monmouth County, New Jersey

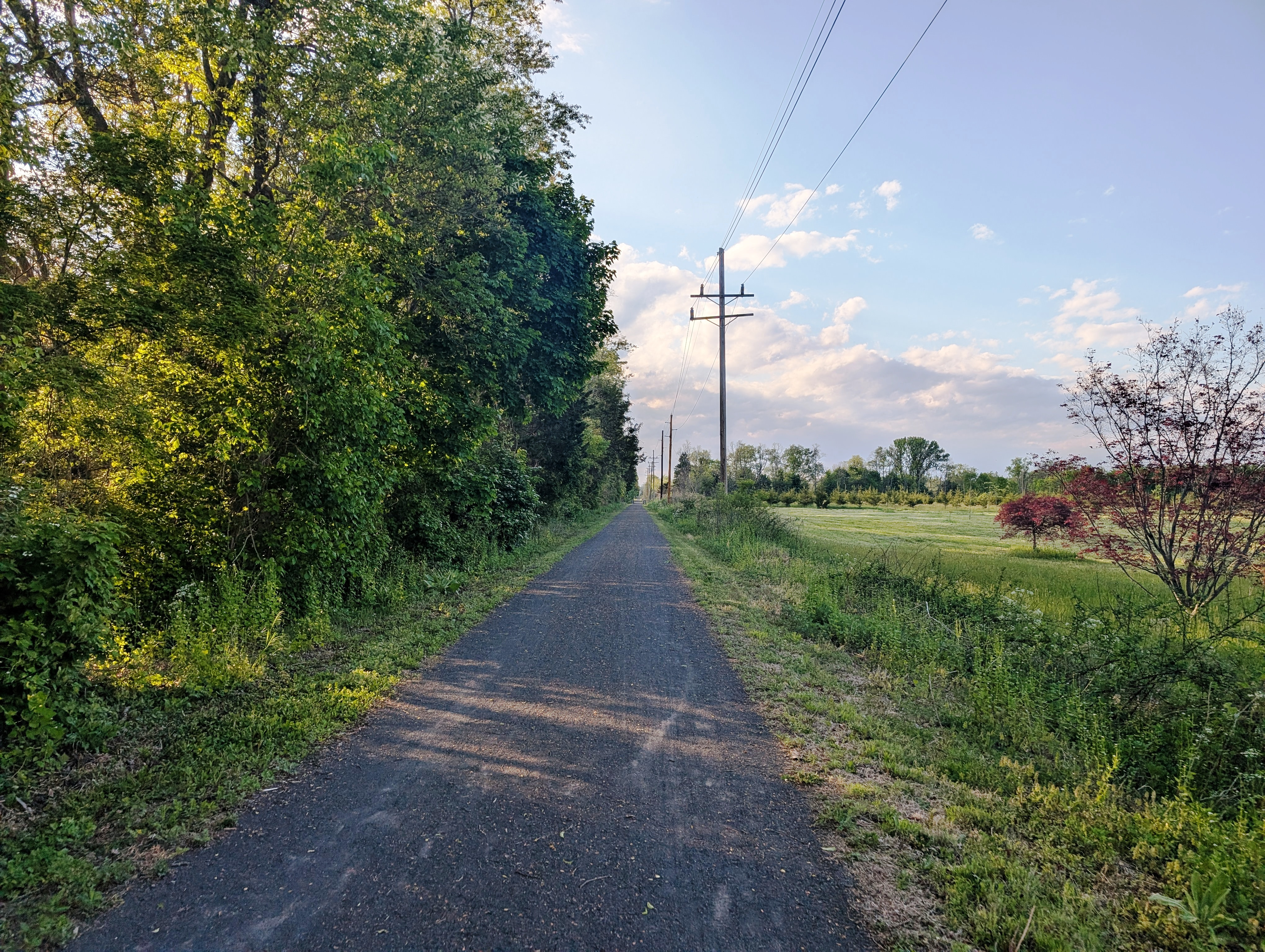
- Trail in Upper Freehold Township
- Length: 9 mi (14 km)
- Location: Monmouth County, New Jersey
- Trailheads: Millstream Road, Jonathan Holmes Road, County Route 539 at the municipal building parking lot and Herbert Road/Sharon Station Road in Upper Freehold Township
- Use: Hiking, cycling, equestrian
- Difficulty: Easy
- Season: Year-round
- Sights: Lahaway Creek, Long Bog Run, Miry Run, Ashby Creek, New Sharon Branch, Cattail Brook, Doctors Creek, Assunpink Creek, Horse Brook
- Surface: Gravel
- Right of way: Pemberton and Hightstown Railroad

The Union Transportation Trail is a 9-mile (14 km) rail trail situated in western Monmouth County, New Jersey. It extends from Hornerstown, New Jersey, to the Assunpink Wildlife Management Area.

The trail occupies the former roadbed of the Pennsylvania Railroad's Pemberton & Hightstown line, which was originally chartered by the Union Transportation Company (UTC) in 1864. The railroad connected local dairies and farms with larger railroads at rail junctions in Pemberton and Hightstown, New Jersey. Traffic gradually dried up, and the line was abandoned by UTC in segments, starting in 1950 with the construction of the New Jersey Turnpike. The line was completely abandoned by 1984. The roadbed was later acquired by Jersey Central Power & Light and was subsequently leased for trail use in 1998 by the Monmouth County Park system.

The Union Transportation Trail—named after the UTC—first opened in September 2010 with the gravel-surfaced 2.2-mile (3.5 km) section between Millstream Road and Jonathan Holmes Road. A 2.0-mile (3.2 km) extension to the trail was completed in 2011, with the 3.0-mile (4.8 km) section between County Route 526 and Herbert Road/Sharon Station Road being added in February 2015. Construction on the segment between County Route 526 and Davis Station Road, 1.5 miles (2.4 km) in length, commenced in 2015 and was completed in September 2016. The fifth segment, completed in late January 2017, comprises the .75 miles (1.21 km) between Herbert Road/Sharon Station Road and County Route 539, passing through the Assunpink Wildlife Management Area. Trail access points with parking lots are located at Millstream Road, Jonathan Holmes Road, and the intersection of Herbert Road and Sharon Station Road, all of which are in Upper Freehold.

A grant awarded through the New Jersey Department of Transportation will fund the construction of a 3.2-mile (5.1 km) extension of the trail from its current terminus at Old York Road in Upper Freehold. This extension will cross over the New Jersey Turnpike and connect to a proposed trail head and parking lot, located near the intersection of Airport Road in East Windsor. Additional expansion is also being considered, including a southern extension into New Egypt, which may extend further south into eastern Burlington County and connect to the Kinkora Branch Trail and the Pemberton Rail-Trail. This would function as a link with the southern New Jersey/greater Philadelphia trail network.
