= Hornerstown, New Jersey =

Populated place in Monmouth County, New Jersey, US

- Unincorporated community
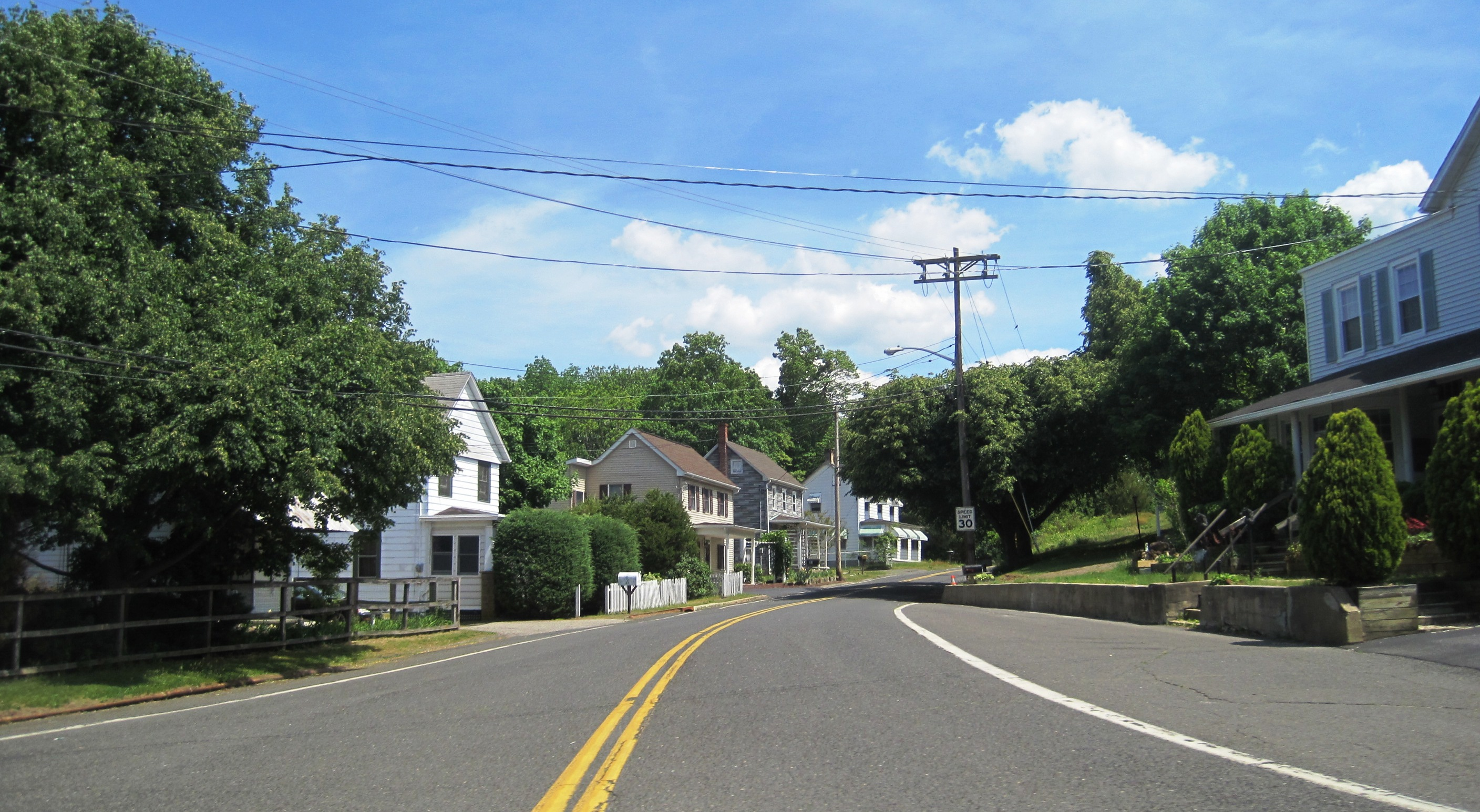
- Center of Hornerstown

- Location in Monmouth County (Inset: Location of Monmouth County in New Jersey) Hornerstown (New Jersey) Hornerstown (the United States)
- Coordinates: 40°06′22″N 74°30′51″W
- Country: United States
- State: New Jersey
- County: Monmouth
- Township: Upper Freehold
- Elevation: 89 ft (27 m)
- GNIS feature ID: 877255

Hornerstown is an unincorporated community located within Upper Freehold Township in Monmouth County, in the U.S. state of New Jersey. Hornerstown is located near Cream Ridge and uses the 08514 ZIP code.

Centered about the intersection of Hornerstown-Arneystown Road and Main Street (both separate branches of Monmouth County Route 27), the area is mostly made up of houses with horse farms west of the community. Small businesses line nearby highways CR 537 and CR 539. The town formerly had a stop on the Pemberton and Hightstown Railroad. The former railroad right-of-way has been developed into the Union Transportation Trail.

Here is the type locality of the Hornerstown Formation, a famous fossiliferous deposit which forms a glauconite greensand layer straddling the K-Pg boundary.
