= Stephen Panasuk =

American football player (born 1989)

No. 11, 14, 15, 12
- Position: Quarterback

Personal information
- Born: January 19, 1989 (age 37); Howell Township, New Jersey, U.S.
- Listed height: 6 ft 2 in (1.88 m)
- Listed weight: 210 lb (95 kg)

Career information
- High school: New Egypt (NJ)
- College: La Salle
- NFL draft: 2011: undrafted

Career history
- Kentucky Drillers (2013); Wyoming Cavalry (2013); Trenton Freedom (2014–2015); ASI Panthers (2016)*; Wichita Force (2016); Cleveland Gladiators (2016–2017); High Country Grizzlies (2017); Jersey Flight (2018–2019); West Virginia Roughriders (2019)
- * Offseason or practice squad member only

Career AFL statistics
- Comp. / Att.: 3 / 8
- Passing yards: 40
- TD–INT: 1–1
- QB rating: 45.83
- Rushing TDs: 0
- Stats at ArenaFan.com

Stephen Panasuk (/ˈpænəsʊk/ PAN-ə-suuk; born January 19, 1989) is an American former professional football quarterback.

== Early life ==
Panasuk attended Grafton High School in Virginia for his first three years and played wide receiver. In 2006, he moved back to New Jersey and played his senior season as a quarterback for the New Egypt High School Warriors in the New Egypt section of Plumsted Township.

== College career ==
Panasuk attended La Salle University upon graduation from high school. He played in eight games as a true freshman in 2007, completing 38 of 96 passes for 373 yards, 3 touchdowns and 7 interceptions. Following the 2007 season, La Salle ended its football program and allowed all their players to transfer to other schools to continue playing football.

Panasuk chose Wagner College to continue his football career, however Panasuk never appeared in a game for the Seahawks.

== Professional career ==
=== Kentucky Drillers ===
Panasuk began his professional career with the Kentucky Drillers of the Continental Indoor Football League (CIFL). He started 5 games before leaving for the Wyoming Cavalry.

=== Wyoming Cavalry ===
Panasuk quickly left the Drillers to join the Wyoming Cavalry of the Indoor Football League (IFL). Panasuk played in nine games, starting seven, during his rookie year with the Cavalry.

=== Trenton Freedom ===
Panasuk returned to New Jersey in 2014 when he joined the Trenton Freedom of the Professional Indoor Football League (PIFL). During the 2014 season, Panasuk served as the backup to Warren Smith, who would go on to win the PIFL MVP.

In 2015, Panasuk played in 10 games for the Freedom, completing 63% of his passes for over 1,800 yards and 38 total touchdowns.

=== Wichita Force ===
Panasuk joined the Wichita Force of Champions Indoor Football (CIF) in 2016. He led the Force to a 5–2 record, completing 61% of his passes for 1,084 yards and 32 total touchdowns before signing with Cleveland.

=== Cleveland Gladiators ===
On April 26, 2016, Panasuk was assigned to the Cleveland Gladiators of the Arena Football League (AFL), where he finished the 2016 season.

=== High Country Grizzlies ===
Panasuk signed with the High Country Grizzlies of the National Arena League (NAL) for the 2017 season. He played in 8 games for the Grizzlies, completing 131 of 239 passes for 1,318 yards, 31 touchdowns and 13 interceptions. He also scored four rushing touchdowns.

=== Jersey Flight ===
On October 25, 2017, Panasuk signed with the Jersey Flight of the NAL. However, the team failed to meet the league's minimum obligations prior to the release of the 2018 schedule and was subsequently removed from the league without playing a game. A few days later, the Flight announced they had joined the American Arena League (AAL).

Panasuk was voted 2018 AAL QB of the year after leading the team to a 7–3 record. He amassed 2,000 passing yards and accounted for 68 total touchdowns to only 7 interceptions on the year.

=== West Virginia Roughriders ===
In May 2019, Panasuk came out of his brief retirement and signed with the West Virginia Roughriders of the AAL prior to the last regular season game. The team went on to win the 2019 AAL Championship. It is his second professional championship. Panasuk saw limited action in relief of former West Virginia University quarterback Jarret Brown. In 1 regular season game and 3 post season games, Panasuk accounted for 362 yards and 7 total touchdowns.

== Personal life ==
Panasuk has been a resident of Jackson Township, New Jersey.
