= New Egypt High School =

High school in Ocean County, New Jersey, US

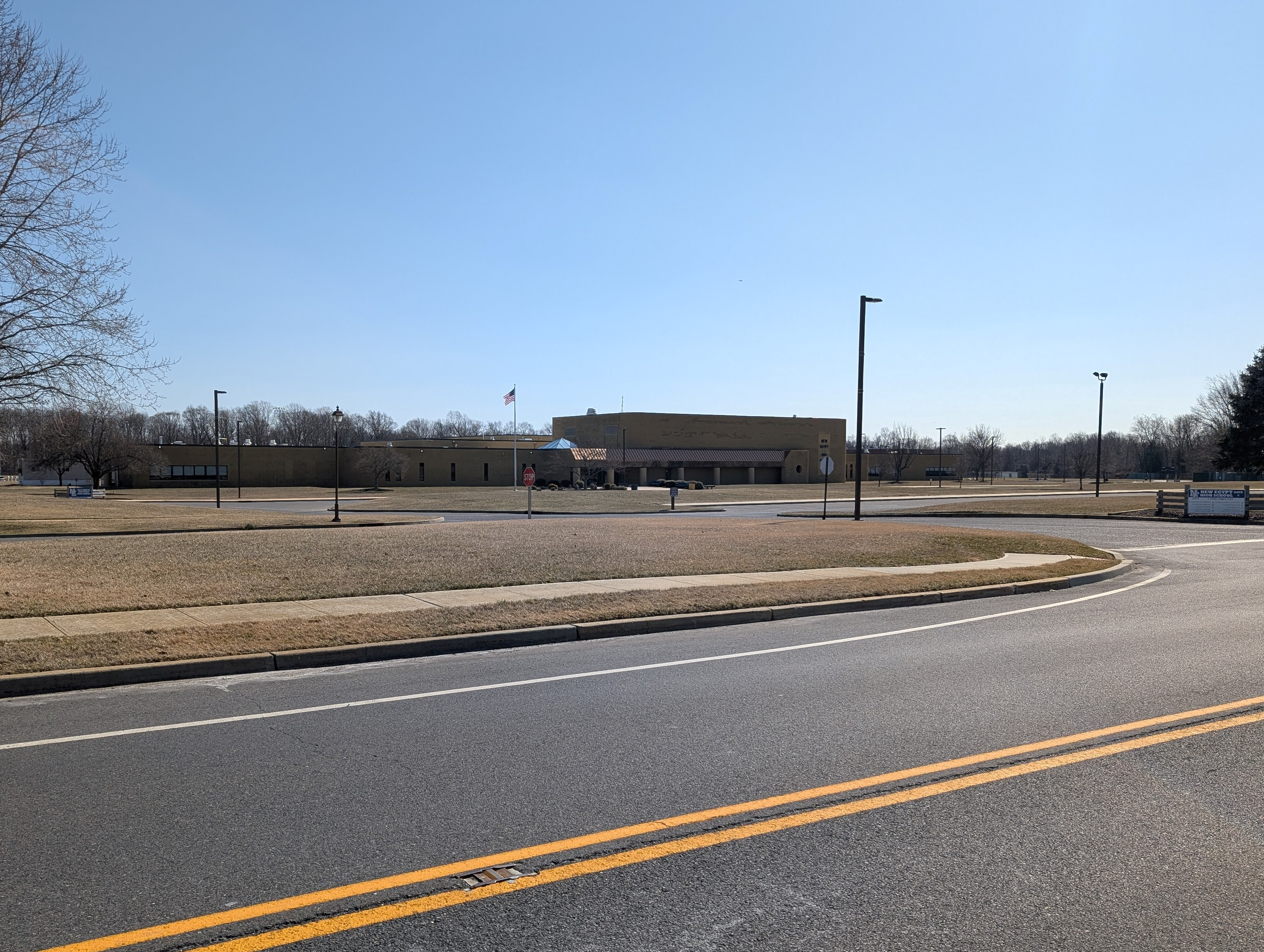

Location
- 117 Evergreen Road; New Egypt, Ocean County, New Jersey 08533; United States; 40.078134°N 74.531852°W

Information
- Type: Public
- Established: 1999
- School district: Plumsted Township School District
- NCES School ID: 341323000341
- Principal: Ashley Walulak
- Faculty: 34.5 FTEs
- Grades: 9-12
- Enrollment: 509 (as of 2024–25)
- Student to teacher ratio: 14.8:1
- Colors: Navy Blue and Vegas Gold
- Athletics conference: Shore Conference
- Team name: Warriors
- Website: nehs.newegypt.us

New Egypt High School is a four-year comprehensive public high school that serves students in ninth through twelfth grades from Plumsted Township in Ocean County, in the U.S. state of New Jersey, operating as the lone secondary school of the Plumsted Township School District.

As of the 2024–25 school year, the school had an enrollment of 509 students and 34.5 classroom teachers (on an FTE basis), for a student–teacher ratio of 14.8:1. There were 108 students (21.2% of enrollment) eligible for free lunch and 19 (3.7% of students) eligible for reduced-cost lunch.

== History ==
Plumsted Township voters approved a December 1997 referendum under which $16.5 million (equivalent to $33.1 million in 2025) would be borrowed to build new school facilities, while the existing middle school would be converted for use as a high school. Later that month, the Commissioner of Education approved the withdrawal, as the feasibility study prepared showed no negative financial impact to either district and would not substantially impact the racial makeup of the students enrolled at Allentown High School. The school opened its doors in September 1999 and admitted 100 ninth-graders who would graduate in spring 2003, ending a sending/receiving relationship that had existed for more than 50 years with the Upper Freehold Regional School District under which students from the township attended Allentown High School.

== Awards, recognition, and rankings ==
The school was the 151st-ranked public high school in New Jersey out of 339 schools statewide in New Jersey Monthly magazine's September 2014 cover story on the state's "Top Public High Schools," using a new ranking methodology. The school had been ranked 193rd in the state of 328 schools in 2012, after being ranked 203rd in 2010 out of 322 schools listed. The magazine ranked the school 193rd in 2008 out of 316 schools. The school was ranked 173rd in the magazine's September 2006 issue, which surveyed 316 schools across the state. Schooldigger.com ranked the school 160th out of 381 public high schools statewide in its 2011 rankings (an increase of 12 positions from the 2010 ranking) which were based on the combined percentage of students classified as proficient or above proficient on the mathematics (80.9%) and language arts literacy (94.5%) components of the High School Proficiency Assessment (HSPA).

== Athletics ==
The New Egypt High School Warriors compete in the Shore Conference, which is comprised of public and private high schools in Ocean, Ocean counties in Central Jersey, operating under the jurisdiction of the New Jersey State Interscholastic Athletic Association (NJSIAA). The school had competed in the Burlington County Scholastic League until the 2024–25 season, switching for geographic and competitive reasons. With 227 students in grades 10-12, the school was classified by the NJSIAA for the 2022–24 school years as Group I South for most athletic competition purposes. The football team competes in the Freedom Division of the 94-team West Jersey Football League superconference and was classified by the NJSIAA as Group I South for football for 2024–2026, which included schools with 185 to 482 students.

The field hockey team won the Central Jersey Group I state sectional title in 2003-2005 and 2008; the team won the Group I state championship in 2005, defeating Pingry School in the final game of the tournament. The team won the state sectional title in 2003, edging Henry Hudson Regional High School in the final game by a 3-2 score. The team won the 2004 title, outscoring Keyport High School by 4-1, In 2005, the field hockey team won the Central Jersey Group I Championship, defeating Palmyra High School in the final game by a score of 5-0. The team won the Group I state title in 2005, defeating Pingry School by a score of 2-1 in the tournament final after having lost to Pingry by one goal in the tournament final in each of the two previous years.

The softball team won the Group I state championship in 2006 (defeating Belvidere High School in the final round of the tournament), 2010 (vs. Wood-Ridge High School), 2011 (vs. Whippany Park High School), 2014 (vs. Butler High School) and 2016 (vs. Butler). The team made it to the 2006 Central Jersey Group I tournament as the number-two seed, defeating South Amboy High School 12-0 in the first round and Florence Township Memorial High School by a score of 2-0 in the semifinals, before defeating Bordentown Regional High School by a score of 3-2 in the tournament final. The 2010 team finished the season with a 29-2 record after winning the Group I title by defeating Wood-Ridge 3-0 in the championship game.

The girls bowling team have won state titles in four consecutive seasons from 2023-2026, most recently defeating Dumont High School in the state final.

The boys basketball team won the 2026 South Jersey Group I sectional title as the 14 seed, defeating Salem 48-46 in the final.

== Administration ==
The school's principal is Ashley Walulak. Her core administration team includes two vice principals.

== Notable alumni ==
- Deena Nicole Cortese (born 1987), reality television star on the MTV hit show Jersey Shore.
- Keith Jones (class of 2003), regional-Emmy Award-winning news anchor and reporter for WCAU in Philadelphia.
- Stephen Panasuk (born 1989), quarterback for the Cleveland Gladiators of the Arena Football League.
- Travis Ward (born 1996), soccer player who plays as a forward for Michigan Stars FC in the National Independent Soccer Association.
