= Keith Jones (broadcaster) =

American news anchor and reporter in Philadelphia, Pennsylvania

Keith Jones is an American television news anchor and reporter for WCAU in Philadelphia, Pennsylvania where he has worked since July 2012. He anchors the station's weekday morning newscast and co-hosts The Lineup, a streaming newscast, and also files reports for NBC News. He has won multiple regional Emmy and Edward R. Murrow awards.

== Early life ==
Jones grew up in the New Egypt section of Plumsted Township, New Jersey and is one of three boys. While attending New Egypt High School, Jones was captain of the basketball team and performed the lead in the school musical all four years. He earned a bachelor's degree in communications and minors in journalism and philosophy from Villanova University.

For three years as an undergraduate, Jones traveled the country with the Villanova Wildcats men's basketball team as a student manager and practice player. In 2005, Jones was with the team on a flight that made an emergency landing in Providence, Rhode Island.

During his junior year, his roommate was NBA All-Star Kyle Lowry. He also worked as an intern in the Sports Department at WCAU in Philadelphia.

== Broadcast history ==
Jones was hired as a reporter for WHSV in Harrisonburg, Virginia. After one year, he was promoted to anchoring weekends and then weekday mornings. The station was awarded "Best Morning News Show" by the Virginia Association of Broadcasters.

After three years in Virginia, Jones was hired as an anchor and reporter for WTAE in Pittsburgh, Pennsylvania. Jones covered stories including the dedication of the Flight 93 Memorial in Shanksville, the 2010 Pennsylvania Governor's race, and the trial of former Penn State assistant football coach Jerry Sandusky.

Jones joined WCAU in Philadelphia as the weekday morning anchor in July 2012. He also anchored the 11:00am hour-long weekday newscast. Jones has covered the London Olympic Games, the sentencing of former Penn State football coach Jerry Sandusky, Superstorm Sandy, the 2013 U.S. Open (golf), the Boston Marathon bombing, and the deadly tornadoes in Moore, Oklahoma. In 2015, Jones reported live from Super Bowl XLIX in Glendale, Arizona, and later that year, covered Pope Francis' visit to Philadelphia. Since 2014, Jones has covered the NCAA Division I men's basketball tournament, including the two national championship runs of the 2015–16 Villanova Wildcats men's basketball team and 2017–18 Villanova Wildcats men's basketball team.

In 2018, Jones covered the 2018 Winter Olympics in South Korea, for which he won a regional Emmy. In 2021, Jones traveled to Tokyo, Japan to cover the 2020 Summer Olympics.

In 2025, Jones appeared in an episode of the A&E docuseries Lie Detector, in which he discussed a murder he covered while working as a reporter in Virginia.

== Recognition ==
In 2021, Jones won the Mid-Atlantic Emmy Award for Outstanding Anchor.

Villanova University, his alma mater, has recognized him with several alumni awards, as well as the Tolle Lege award for his teaching work.

In 2024, Jones was recognized by the Augustinian order of the Catholic Church at their annual Profile in Augustinian Leadership.

== Other activities ==
Jones has taught as an adjunct professor of broadcast journalism at his alma mater Villanova University since 2013. In 2019, Jones also taught a guest master class at The College of New Jersey. He gave a commencement address at Arcadia University in May 2024.

Jones serves on the boards of Main Line Deputy Dog, Turning Points for Children, and the Philadelphia Fireman's Hall Museum. He has volunteered for the American Red Cross of Southeastern Pennsylvania since 2012. He has hosted the regional organization's Red Ball since March 2014. He also volunteers with Villanova's Office of Disability Services.

== Personal life ==
Jones' girlfriend Cara McCollum, who held the title of Miss New Jersey, died in 2016 after being injured in a car accident. Jones delivered the eulogies at her funeral and a memorial service. He presents the annual Cara McCollum Scholarship at the Miss New Jersey Pageant.

Jones is married to Holly Harrar. The couple had a son in 2024.
