= Deena Nicole Cortese =

American reality television personality

- Born: January 12, 1987 (age 39); New Egypt, New Jersey, U.S.
- Education: Brookdale Community College
- Years active: 2010–present
- Known for: Jersey Shore; Jersey Shore: Family Vacation
- Spouse: Christopher Buckner (m. 2017)
- Children: 2

Deena Nicole Buckner (née Cortese; born January 12, 1987) is an American reality television personality who appeared on the MTV reality show Jersey Shore from 2010 to 2012 and is currently on Jersey Shore: Family Vacation.

== Early life and education ==
Cortese was born in the New Egypt section of Plumsted Township, New Jersey to Italian-American parents John (1949–2016) and Joan Cortese. Cortese's older sister, Joanie Maiorella, was put up for adoption and lived down the road from them. Cortese learned this when she was seven-years-old and met her sister thereafter. Maiorella appeared in several episodes throughout season five of Jersey Shore.

Cortese attended New Egypt High School, where she participated in both cheerleading and dance. After graduating, she briefly attended Brookdale Community College in Middletown Township, New Jersey.

== Career ==
Cortese was a cast member on the reality TV series Jersey Shore. Deena had originally auditioned for season 1, but declined an offer to participate due to a family emergency; however, she was cast by MTV when Angelina Pivarnick left the show after season two, and Snooki suggested her as a replacement. She joined the cast in season three, which filmed in Seaside Heights, New Jersey.

In 2014, Cortese appeared on Couples Therapy.

In 2018, Cortese returned to MTV as one of the cast members of Jersey Shore: Family Vacation, which is still running and she currently remains on the show.

== Personal life ==
In November 2016, Cortese became engaged to Christopher Buckner. They were married on October 28, 2017. In 2018, Cortese revealed that she and her husband were expecting their first child, a son. Cortese gave birth to Christopher John "CJ" Buckner, named after her husband, Chris, and after her late father John, who died on January 5, 2016. In October 2020, she revealed that she and her husband were expecting their second child in May 2021 and later revealed to be a boy. Cortese gave birth to Cameron Theo Buckner on May 1, 2021. The couple recently had two homes in Jackson Township, New Jersey, and moved to another town after they had their second child.

== Filmography ==
Year	Production	Role	Notes
2010–2012	Jersey Shore	Herself	Main cast (seasons 3–6)
2010	When I Was 17	Herself	Guest
2011	Silent Library	Herself	Cameo appearance
2012–2014	Snooki & Jwoww	Herself	Appeared in 4 episodes
2013	Couples Therapy	Herself	Main (Season 5)
2018–2026	Jersey Shore: Family Vacation	Herself	Main
2018	Celebrity Fear Factor	Herself	Contestant
2020	Celebrity Family Feud	Herself	Season 7, Episode 4
