= Kinkora, New Jersey =

Populated place in Burlington County, New Jersey, US

- Unincorporated community
- Location in Burlington County (Inset: Burlington County in New Jersey) Kinkora (New Jersey) Kinkora (the United States)
- Coordinates: 40°07′03″N 74°45′19″W
- Country: United States
- State: New Jersey
- County: Burlington
- Township: Mansfield
- Elevation: 39 ft (12 m)
- Time zone: UTC−05:00 (Eastern (EST))
  - Summer (DST): UTC−04:00 (Eastern (EDT))
- Area codes: 609, 640
- GNIS feature ID: 877587

Kinkora is an unincorporated community in Mansfield Township, in Burlington County, in the U.S. state of New Jersey. This community used to be a rail terminal for the Kinkora branch and its junction with the Amboy Division of the railroad. The name "Kinkora" is of Native American origin, and the area was known as Quinkoringh.

== Transportation ==
New Jersey Transit provides bus service to and from Philadelphia on the 409 route.
