= FIRST Steamworks =

2017 FIRST Robotics Competition game

FIRST STEAMworks
- Year: 2017

Season Information
- Number of teams: 3,357
- Number of regionals: 55
- Number of district events: 90
- Championship location: Houston; George R. Brown Convention Center; Minute Maid Park; St. Louis; Dome at America's Center; America's Center; FIRST Festival of Champions; SNHU Arena, Manchester, New Hampshire

FIRST Championship Awards
- Chairman's Award winner: Houston; 3132 - "Thunder Down Under"; St. Louis; 2614 - "Mountaineer Area Robotics"
- Woodie Flowers Award winner: Tim Bennington-Davis - Team 1425
- Founder's Award winner: St. Louis Area Planning Committee
- Champions: Houston; 973 - "Greybots"; 1011 - "CRUSH"; 2928 - "Viking Robotics"; 5499 - "The Bay Orangutans"; St. Louis; 2767 - "Stryke Force"; 254 - "The Cheesy Poofs"; 862 - "Lightning Robotics"; 1676 - "The Pascack PI-oneers"; Festival of Champions; St. Louis Alliance

Links
- Website: Official website

FIRST Steamworks, stylized as FIRST STEAMworks, was the FIRST Robotics Competition game for the 2017 season. As in past games, two alliances of three individual teams and their robots compete on a field to score "match" point to win the game and ranking points to advance to playoff rounds. The game has a steampunk theme and teams are required to shoot wiffle balls which represent fuel into a simulated boiler which transfers the generated steam into an airship in the middle of the field. Each alliance has one airship, which they pressurize with steam from the boiler and load with plastic gears from the field. At the end of the match, robots can climb and hang on team-supplied ropes (or standard ropes supplied by FIRST) attached to the airship for additional points.

== Kickoff ==
The Kickoff event for FIRST Steamworks occurred on Saturday January 7, 2017. The kickoff video featured the theme song for the season, "Steam Powered" by Professor Elemental, and an explanation of the game. The video was livestreamed at 10:30 AM ET, with many teams attending "local Kickoff Events" to kickstart their build season.

== Field ==
FIRST Steamworks is played on a field 27 ft (8.2 m) by 54 ft 4 in (16.56 m), covered in green carpet and bounded by transparent polycarbonate guardrails on the longer sides and the Alliance Walls on the shorter sides. It is divided into the Neutral Zone, alliance specific Launchpads, Keys and Retrieval Zones.

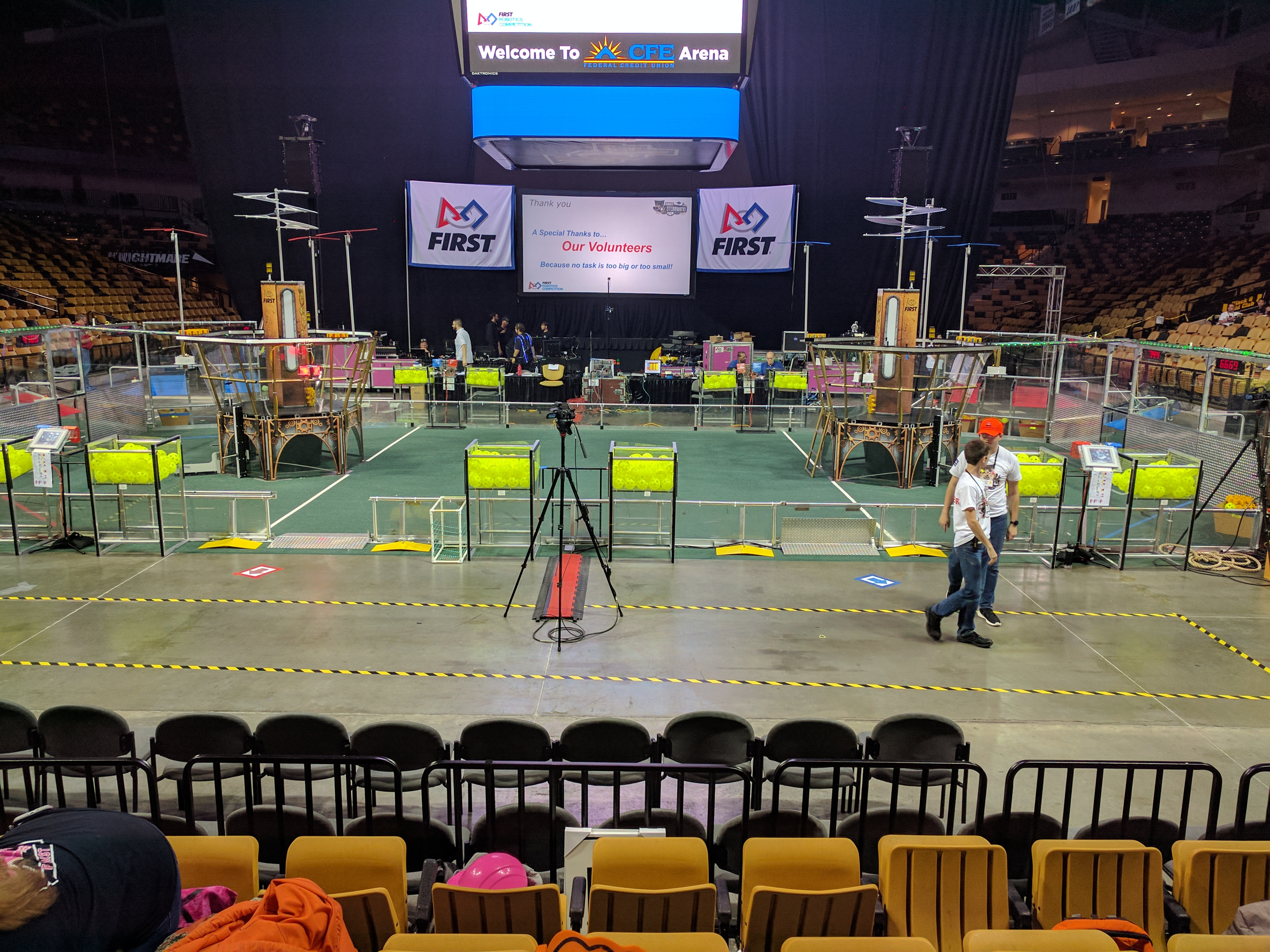
The field for FIRST Steamworks at the Orlando Regional

=== Neutral Zone ===
The Neutral Zone is an area in the middle of the field that contains no major scoring elements, and is neutral to both alliances. It is bounded by the Launchpad Lines, white in colour, and the Launchpad Lines are not part of the Neutral Zone.

=== Launchpad ===
Each side of the arena is called the Launchpad. The Launchpad is alliance specific, bounded by the Launchpad Lines and the Alliance Wall. Each Launchpad belongs to the alliance that has their Alliance Wall bounding it. Robots start the match contacting the Alliance Wall. The Launchpad contains the Key, Retrieval Zone and the Airship.

==== Key ====
The Key is the area in front of the Boiler. It is bounded by alliance-coloured tape and the Boiler and is contained inside the alliance's own Launchpad. Opposing robots may not stay in the Key for more than 5 seconds, as this would obstruct the alliance from scoring in the Boiler.

==== Retrieval Zone ====
The Retrieval Zone is the area in front of the Loading Station. It is inside the opposite alliance's Launchpad, meaning that the robot must travel to the other side of the field to get to the Loading Station. Robots in the Retrieval Zone normally receive scoring elements through the Loading Stations. Robots may not contact another robot in the opposing Retrieval Zone, regardless of who initiates the contact.

=== Alliance Station and Loading Lanes ===
The Alliance Station is the area behind the Alliance Wall where drivers are stationed. They control their robots from the Driver Stations inside the Alliance Station, behind the Alliance Wall. Behind the Alliance Station is the Loading Lane, belonging to the opposite alliance. Human Players are stationed in the Loading Lanes, with a supply of both gears and fuel to deposit through the Loading Stations to the robots, who then score points with them. Both areas are bounded by alliance-coloured tape. The Loading Station is the only way to get more gears after the start of the match and one of the two ways to get more fuel, the other being the Hoppers.

=== Boiler ===
The Boiler is located at the corner of the field, belonging to the alliance that has its Alliance Wall next to it and their Key in front of it. There are two goals on the Boiler, the Low Efficiency Goal, which is 1 ft 6 in (46 cm) above the ground, and the High Efficiency Goal, which is 8 ft 1 in (246 cm) off the ground. The Low Efficiency Goal is low enough for robots to dump fuel into, though the High Efficiency Goal is too high to do that, so fuel must be launched upwards into it. Fuel may only be launched from an alliance's own Launchpad.

=== Hoppers ===
There are five Hoppers stationed around the field, on the guardrails. There are polycarbonate plates on the guardrails. If these are hit by a robot, 2 containers of fuel (1 Hopper) are released onto the field. There are 50 fuel in each container and 100 fuel in each Hopper. Hoppers are neutral with one in each Launchpad and the rest in the Neutral Zone, so any alliance can use the Hoppers. This is one of the two ways robots can get more fuel after the game starts, with the other being the Loading Station.

=== Airship ===
The Airship is located in the centre of the alliance's Launchpad, is hexagonal in shape and is the main way alliances score points. Two Human Players, known as Pilots, are stationed inside the Airship. On the Airship there are 3 lifts with pegs for robots to deposit gears onto and a cable to let the Pilots pull the gears from the pegs onto the Airship. The lifts are on the 3 faces that are closest to the Alliance Wall. Pegs consist of a plastic spike and a spring that bends, which may cause the gear to fall off the peg while it is being lifted into the Airship. There are bumpers that separate the pegs, with each on the corner of the face. The edge of the bumpers also define the Base Line, a line marked with green tape that is parallel to the Alliance Wall and touching the edge of the bumpers. Also on the Airship are davits, which each hold a rope and a Touchpad. The davits are positioned with one on the side of the hexagon facing the Alliance Wall and the others two faces away. At the end of the game, the robots attempt to climb the ropes connected to the davits, activating the Touchpad. In the middle of the Airship is the Steam Tank, which displays lights for how much fuel has been scored in the Boiler and also where the first gear is placed to activate the first rotor. The other gears must be placed on the sides of the Airship, with an increasing number of gears required for each succeeding rotor. The second rotor requires 2 gears, the third requires 4 gears and the fourth requires 6 gears. There is one reserve "free" gear that is pre-placed on the Airship for the Pilots to use, however it cannot be used in the Autonomous period.

== Gameplay and Scoring ==
=== Scoring Elements ===
There are two major scoring elements in the FIRST Steamworks game, namely fuel and gears. Fuel are plastic wiffleballs with 26 holes in them, are "Screamin' Yellow" in colour, weigh about 2.6 oz (74 g) each, with a 5 inches (13 cm) diameter. Gears are plastic toothed wheels with 10 teeth, weigh 18.4 oz (520 g) each, an 11 inches (28 cm) diameter, a 10 inches (25 cm) pitch diameter and are 2 inches (5.1 cm) thick. Robots may control as many fuel as they wish, but only 1 gear at a time. Ropes are also regulated.

=== Autonomous Period ===
Robots start the match contacting their Alliance Wall, with up to 1 gear and up to 10 fuel preloaded on the robot. The first 15 seconds of the match is called the Autonomous Period. Robots are controlled by pre-programmed commands with no driver input, hence they operate autonomously. Drivers and Human Players must stand behind the white Starting Line during Autonomous to ensure this is the case. Pilots, however, may still operate the lifts and place gears/turn rotors during Autonomous, but may not touch the reserve gear. Each rotor that is activated in Autonomous gives the alliance 60 points, each fuel scored in the High Goal is worth 1 kilopascal and each fuel scored in the Low Goal is worth 1/3 kilopascals. Also, if a robot crosses the Base Line, it earns 5 points. If a rotor is engaged in Autonomous, the yellow stack lights next to it will illuminate.

=== Teleop Period ===
After the Autonomous Period ends, the Teleop Period (Tele-operated) begins. It lasts for 135 seconds and robots are controlled by driver inputs. Rotors that are engaged in Teleop earns the alliance 40 points, fuel in the High Goal is worth 1/3 kilopascals and fuel in the Low Goal is worth 1/9 kilopascals. At the end of the match, each whole kilopascal accumulated throughout both periods is worth 1 point.

==== End Game ====
The last 30 seconds of the Teleop Period is called the End Game. In the End Game, Pilots deploy the ropes on the Airship to let the robots climb them. Each robot that climbs a rope and activates a Touchpad for at least 1 second and when the game timer reaches 0 earns 50 points for their alliance.

=== Special Scoring ===
There are some other ways that alliances can score points. If an alliance scores at least 40 kilopascals throughout the match, they earn 1 extra Ranking Point for qualification matches and 20 points for playoff matches. Also, if an alliance gets all four rotors turning by the end of the match, they score 1 extra Ranking Point for qualification matches and 100 points for playoff matches. Another way to score extra points is by penalties. If the opposing alliance breaks the rules, they may receive a Foul or a Tech Foul. A Foul is 5 points to the other alliance and a Tech Foul is 25 points to the other alliance.

=== Scoring Summary ===
Action	Autonomous	Teleop	Ranking Points
Mobility	5 points		
Rotor Spinning	60 points	40 points	
Fuel in High Goal	1 kilopascal	1/3 kilopascal	
Fuel in Low Goal	1/3 kilopascal	1/9 kilopascal	
Every 1 kilopascal	1 point	1 point	
Climb Rope		50 points	
At least 40 kilopascals		20 points (in Playoffs)	1 RP (in Qualification)
All 4 Rotors spinning		100 points (in Playoffs)	1 RP (in Qualification)
Foul	5 points	5 points	
Tech Foul	25 points	25 points	
Win			2 RP (in Qualification)
Tie			1 RP (in Qualification)

== Events ==
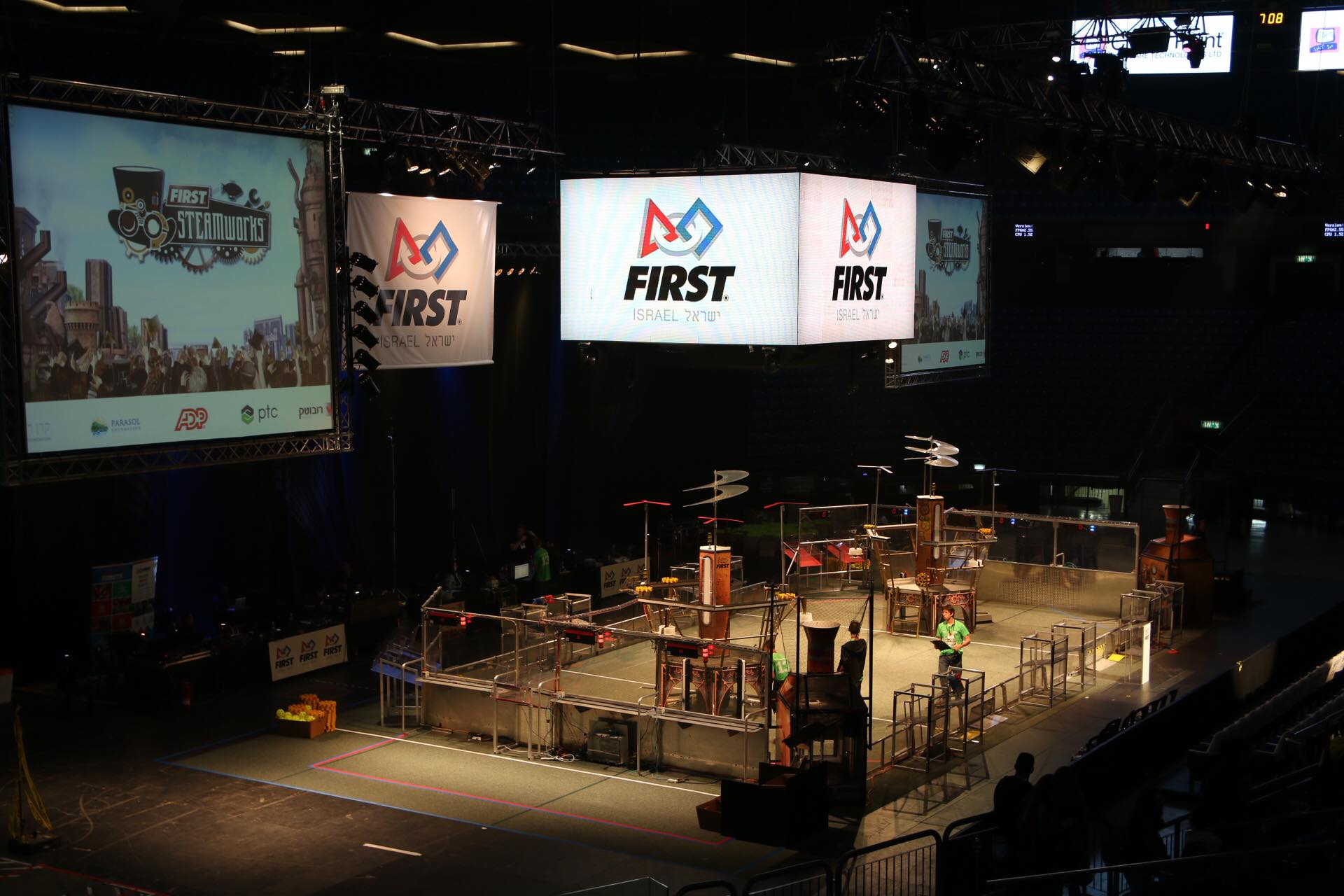
The FIRST Steamworks Field at the Menora Mivtachim Arena, 2017 Israel District Championship

FIRST holds many competitions around the world in the 7 week season, with many teams qualifying for the FIRST Championship each event. Only regional and district championship events are listed.

=== Week 1 ===
Event	Location	Date
South Florida	West Palm Beach, Florida	March 1–4
Lake Superior	Duluth, Minnesota	March 1–4
Northern Lights	Duluth, Minnesota	March 1–4
Toluca	Toluca	March 1–4
Palmetto	Myrtle Beach, South Carolina	March 1–4
Hub City	Lubbock, Texas	March 1–4

=== Week 2 ===
Event	Location	Date
Arkansas Rock City	Little Rock, Arkansas	March 8–11
Arizona North	Flagstaff, Arizona	March 8–11
San Diego	Del Mar, California	March 8–11
Orlando	Orlando, Florida	March 8–11
Shenzhen	Shenzhen	March 8–11
St. Louis	St. Louis	March 8–11
Miami Valley	Springfield, Ohio	March 8–11
Dallas	Irving, Texas	March 8–11
Utah	West Valley City, Utah	March 8–11
Central Valley	Madera, California	March 9–12
Southern Cross	Sydney	March 13–15

=== Week 3 ===
Event	Location	Date
Ventura	Ventura, California	March 15–18
Central Illinois	Peoria, Illinois	March 15–18
Greater Kansas City	Kansas City, Missouri	March 15–18
Finger Lakes	Rochester, New York	March 15–18
New York Tech Valley	Troy, New York	March 15–18
Greater Pittsburgh	California, Pennsylvania	March 15–18
Lone Star Central	Houston	March 15–18
South Pacific	Sydney	March 16–18
San Francisco	San Francisco	March 16–19

=== Week 4 ===
Event	Location	Date
Rocket City	Huntsville, Alabama	March 22–25
Sacramento	Davis, California	March 22–25
Colorado	Denver	March 22–25
Iowa	Cedar Falls, Iowa	March 22–25
Bayou	Kenner, Louisiana	March 22–25
Oklahoma	Oklahoma City	March 22–25
Montreal	Montreal, Québec	March 22–25
Smoky Mountains	Knoxville, Tennessee	March 22–25
Wisconsin	Milwaukee	March 22–25
Los Angeles	Long Beach, California	March 23–26
Hudson Valley	Suffern, New York	March 23–26
Israel District Championship	Tel Aviv, Israel	March 28–30

=== Week 5 ===
Event	Location	Date
Orange County	Irvine, California	March 29 – April 1
Silicon Valley	San Jose, California	March 29 – April 1
Hawaii	Honolulu	March 29 – April 1
Idaho	Boise, Idaho	March 29 – April 1
Midwest	Chicago	March 29 – April 1
Laguna	Torreón	March 29 – April 1
Buckeye	Cleveland	March 29 – April 1
Brazos Valley	Waco, Texas	March 30 – April 2
Lone Star North	The Woodlands, Texas	March 30 – April 2
North Carolina District Championship	Lillington, North Carolina	March 31 – April 2

=== Week 6 ===
Event	Location	Date
Western Canada	Calgary, Alberta	April 5–8
Arizona West	Phoenix, Arizona	April 5–8
Peachtree District Championship	Athens, Georgia	April 5–8
Minnesota 10000 Lakes	Minneapolis	April 5–8
Minnesota North Star	Minneapolis	April 5–8
Las Vegas	Las Vegas	April 5–8
Alamo	San Antonio	April 5–8
Chesapeake District Championship	Richmond, Virginia	April 5–8
Mid-Atlantic District Championship	Bethlehem, Pennsylvania	April 5–8
Pacific Northwest District Championship	Cheney, Washington	April 5–8
New England District Championship	Durham, New Hampshire	April 5–8
Indiana District Championship	Huntington, Indiana	April 6–8
New York City	New York City	April 6–9

=== Week 7 ===
Event	Location	Date
Michigan District Championship	University Center, Michigan	April 12–15
Seven Rivers	La Crosse, Wisconsin	April 12–15
Ontario District Championship	Mississauga, Ontario	April 12–15

=== FIRST Championship ===
Event	Location	Date
FIRST Championship (Houston)	Houston	April 19–22
FIRST Championship (St. Louis)	St. Louis	April 26–29
FIRST Festival of Champions	Manchester, New Hampshire	July 28–29

== Results ==
The following tables show the winners of the subdivisions and finals at each FIRST Championship event, as well as the Festival of Champions

=== Houston ===
==== Subdivision Winners ====
Division	Captain	1st Pick	2nd Pick	3rd Pick
Carver	2122	987	4910	6314
Turing	1318	2046	1595	2907
Galileo	5654	2415	2630	4112
Roebling	973	1011	2928	5499
Hopper	604	2848	1868	2903
Newton	118	1678	4188	5892

==== Einstein ====
===== Round Robin =====
Pos	Division	Pld	W	L	Pts	Qualification
1	Newton (Q)	5	4	1	1.6	Advance to Einstein Finals
2	Roebling (Q)	5	3	2	1.2	Advance to Einstein Finals
3	Carver	5	3	2	1.2	
4	Hopper	5	3	2	1.2	
5	Galileo	5	2	3	0.8	
6	Turing	5	0	5	0	

(Q) Qualified for the phase indicated

===== Finals =====
Division	Alliance	1	2	Wins
Newton	118-1678-4188-5892	472	469	0
Roebling	973-1011-2928-5499	539	495	2

=== St. Louis ===
==== Subdivision Winners ====
Division	Captain	1st Pick	2nd Pick	3rd Pick
Archimedes	1058	67	1640	2137
Carson	125	5687	1796	597
Curie	2056	1241	384	1511
Daly	2767	254	862	1676
Darwin	1986	3310	302	3719
Tesla	3452	3683	2084	2537

==== Einstein ====
===== Round Robin =====
Pos	Division	Pld	W	L	Pts	Qualification
1	Darwin (Q)	5	3	2	1.2	Advance to Einstein Finals
2	Daly (Q)	5	3	2	1.2	Advance to Einstein Finals
3	Curie	5	3	2	1.2	
4	Carson	5	3	2	1.2	
5	Tesla	5	2	3	0.8	
6	Archimedes	5	1	4	0.4	

(Q) Qualified for the phase indicated

===== Finals =====
Division	Alliance	1	2	Wins
Darwin	1986-3310-302-3719	487	543	0
Daly	2767-254-862-1676	494	546	2

=== Festival of Champions ===
Championship	Alliance	1	2	3	4	5	Wins
Houston	973-1011-4188-5499	508	492	459	539	310	2
St. Louis	2767-254-862-1676	342	428	485	555	588	3
