= New Egypt, New Jersey =

Place in Ocean County, New Jersey, United States

- Census-designated place
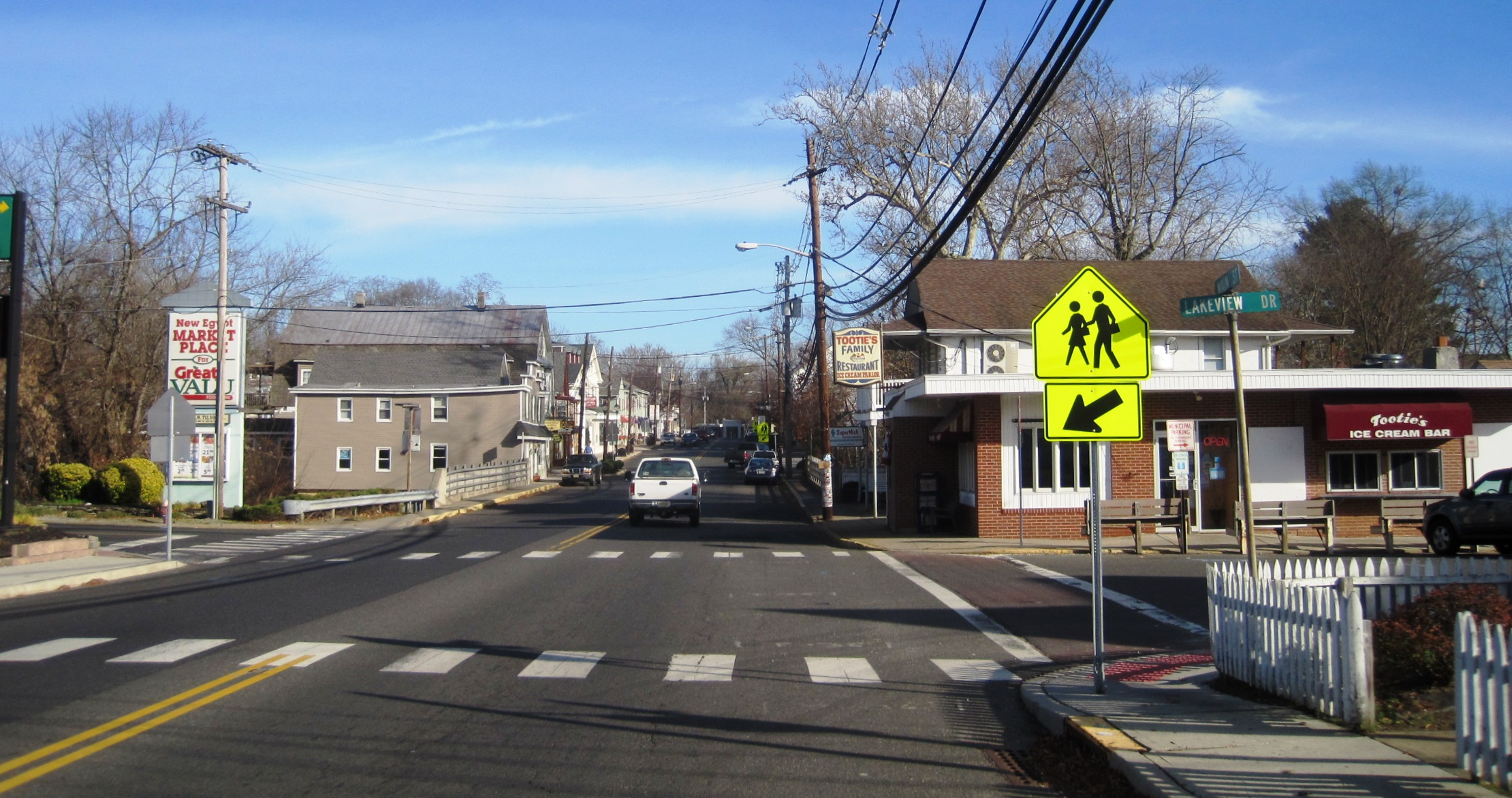
- Along Main Street (CR 528)

- Location of New Egypt in Ocean County highlighted in red (left). Inset map: Location of Ocean County in New Jersey highlighted in orange (right).

- Location in Ocean County Location in New Jersey Location in the United States
- Coordinates: 40.065119°N 74.527040°W
- Country: United States
- State: New Jersey
- County: Ocean
- Township: Plumsted

Area
  - Total: 4.02 sq mi (10.42 km^{2})
  - Land: 3.97 sq mi (10.28 km^{2})
  - Water: 0.054 sq mi (0.14 km^{2}) 1.38%
- Elevation: 82 ft (25 m)

Population (2020)
  - Total: 2,357
  - Density: 593.7/sq mi (229.23/km^{2})
- Time zone: UTC−05:00 (Eastern (EST))
  - Summer (DST): UTC−04:00 (Eastern (EDT))
- ZIP Code: 08533
- Area code: 609
- FIPS code: 34-51360
- GNIS feature ID: 2389541

New Egypt is an unincorporated community and census-designated place (CDP) located within Plumsted Township, in Ocean County, in the U.S. state of New Jersey. As of the 2020 census, New Egypt had a population of 2,357. The community is located at the trijunction of Burlington County, Monmouth County and Ocean counties.

== History ==
There are several explanations for how New Egypt received its name. One possibility is it was a reference by George Washington in December 1776 after the victory at the Battle of Trenton. Joseph Curtis, Washington's secretary, was sent to the town to retrieve grain for the army, and upon his return from the area, Washington exclaimed, "Joseph has been to Egypt and gotten the corn." ‘New' was added sometime around 1845. Other references have that the town was originally given the name "Egypt" in 1793 and "New Egypt" in 1801, the name is believed to be a biblical allusion about "going to Egypt for corn" that was plentiful in the area.

Around 1890, the area was once known as Timmins Mill, a reference to the mill owner who owned most of the land in the area.

== Geography ==
According to the United States Census Bureau, the CDP had a total area of 4.071 square miles (10.54 km^{2}), including 4.015 square miles (10.40 km^{2}) of land and 0.056 square miles (0.15 km^{2}) of water (1.38%).

Author Henry Charlton Beck gave Timmins Mill the distinction of the approximate geographical center of New Jersey. Upon reading the estimate by Beck, a Christmas tree farmer used their own methods to approximate the geographic center of New Jersey to be on their farm. They have since placed a marker on the location they determined as the geographic center of New Jersey (Coordinates 40° 05’02” N Latitude 74° 32’ 01” W longitude). The marker is on their farm located across the street from the New Egypt High School.

== Community ==
The community has a volunteer fire station, a first aid station, and a police department. New Egypt is also home to the New Egypt Historical Society, a clay race track called the New Egypt Speedway, and the Plumsted Branch of the Ocean County Library system.

The town also includes several Christian religious centers, Assumption Roman Catholic Church, Bethel AME Church, Bible Baptist Church, Church of Christ, Iglesia Ni Cristo, Kingdom Hall of Jehovah's Witnesses, New Egypt United Methodist Church, Plumsted Presbyterian Church, the Christian Fellowship Church of New Egypt, and the Church of Jesus Christ of Latter-day Saints. Oakford Lake is located in the middle of the town. In the early 1900s the location thrived as a tourist and vacation attraction.

New Egypt also has a recreation center which includes four baseball fields, a football field, two softball fields, and a basketball court and three small fields used for tee ball.

McGuire Air Force Base is immediately south of New Egypt.

== Demographics ==
Historical population
| Census | Pop. | Note | %± |
|---|---|---|---|
| 1880 | 632 | | — |
| 1890 | 556 | | −12.0% |
| 1950 | 1,294 | | — |
| 1960 | 1,737 | | 34.2% |
| 1970 | 1,769 | | 1.8% |
| 1980 | 2,111 | | 19.3% |
| 1990 | 2,327 | | 10.2% |
| 2000 | 2,519 | | 8.3% |
| 2010 | 2,512 | | −0.3% |
| 2020 | 2,357 | | −6.2% |
Population sources: 1880-1890; 1950 1960 1970; 1980 1990 2000 2020

New Egypt was listed as an unincorporated community in the 1950 U.S. census; and then as a census designated place in the 1980 U.S. census.

=== Racial and ethnic composition ===
Navesink CDP, New Jersey – Racial and ethnic composition Note: the US Census treats Hispanic/Latino as an ethnic category. This table excludes Latinos from the racial categories and assigns them to a separate category. Hispanics/Latinos may be of any race.
| Race / Ethnicity (NH = Non-Hispanic) | Pop 2000 | Pop 2010 | Pop 2020 | % 2000 | % 2010 | % 2020 |
|---|---|---|---|---|---|---|
| White alone (NH) | 1,623 | 1,736 | 1,694 | 82.72% | 85.94% | 84.53% |
| Black or African American alone (NH) | 235 | 118 | 78 | 11.98% | 5.84% | 3.89% |
| Native American or Alaska Native alone (NH) | 1 | 0 | 0 | 0.05% | 0.00% | 0.00% |
| Asian alone (NH) | 27 | 45 | 40 | 1.38% | 2.23% | 2.00% |
| Native Hawaiian or Pacific Islander alone (NH) | 1 | 0 | 0 | 0.05% | 0.00% | 0.00% |
| Other race alone (NH) | 2 | 2 | 12 | 0.10% | 0.10% | 0.60% |
| Mixed race or Multiracial (NH) | 23 | 19 | 75 | 1.17% | 0.94% | 3.74% |
| Hispanic or Latino (any race) | 50 | 100 | 105 | 2.55% | 4.95% | 5.24% |
| Total | 1,962 | 2,020 | 2,004 | 100.00% | 100.00% | 100.00% |

=== 2020 census ===
As of the 2020 census, New Egypt had a population of 2,357. The median age was 40.7 years. 21.0% of residents were under the age of 18 and 12.9% of residents were 65 years of age or older. For every 100 females there were 107.5 males, and for every 100 females age 18 and over there were 105.7 males age 18 and over.

0.0% of residents lived in urban areas, while 100.0% lived in rural areas.

There were 898 households in New Egypt, of which 30.8% had children under the age of 18 living in them. Of all households, 46.9% were married-couple households, 21.7% were households with a male householder and no spouse or partner present, and 21.7% were households with a female householder and no spouse or partner present. About 24.0% of all households were made up of individuals and 7.4% had someone living alone who was 65 years of age or older.

There were 991 housing units, of which 9.4% were vacant. The homeowner vacancy rate was 3.0% and the rental vacancy rate was 8.1%.

=== 2010 census ===
The 2010 United States census counted 2,512 people, 902 households, and 652 families in the CDP. The population density was 625.7 people per square mile (241.6 people/km^{2}). There were 972 housing units at an average density of 242.1 units per square mile (93.5 units/km^{2}). The racial makeup was 91.44% (2,297) White, 1.99% (50) Black or African American, 0.84% (21) Native American, 0.96% (24) Asian, 0.08% (2) Pacific Islander, 3.11% (78) from other races, and 1.59% (40) from two or more races. Hispanic or Latino of any race were 10.51% (264) of the population.

Of the 902 households, 34.8% had children under the age of 18; 52.9% were married couples living together; 13.2% had a female householder with no husband present and 27.7% were non-families. Of all households, 21.3% were made up of individuals and 7.1% had someone living alone who was 65 years of age or older. The average household size was 2.78 and the average family size was 3.21.

25.3% of the population were under the age of 18, 9.1% from 18 to 24, 26.7% from 25 to 44, 29.8% from 45 to 64, and 9.2% who were 65 years of age or older. The median age was 37.2 years. For every 100 females, the population had 103.4 males. For every 100 females ages 18 and older there were 99.5 males.

=== 2000 census ===
As of the 2000 United States census there were 2,519 people, 913 households, and 664 families residing in New Egypt. The population density was 241.9 people/km^{2} (627 people/mi^{2}). There were 980 housing units at an average density of 94.1 units/km^{2} (244 units/mi^{2}). The racial makeup of New Egypt was 91.90% White, 2.18% African American, 0.28% Native American, 1.27% Asian, 2.74% from other races, and 1.63% from two or more races. Hispanic or Latino of any race were 6.19% of the population.

There were 913 households, out of which 38.2% had children under the age of 18 living with them, 56.6% were married couples living together, 11.8% had a female householder with no husband present, and 27.2% were non-families. 21.1% of all households were made up of individuals, and 6.0% had someone living alone who was 65 years of age or older. The average household size was 2.76 and the average family size was 3.18.

In New Egypt the population was spread out, with 28.1% under the age of 18, 8.9% from 18 to 24, 33.4% from 25 to 44, 21.2% from 45 to 64, and 8.3% who were 65 years of age or older. The median age was 36 years. For every 100 females, there were 99.8 males. For every 100 females age 18 and over, there were 99.1 males.

The median income for a household in New Egypt was $49,297, and the median income for a family was $50,833. Males had a median income of $38,156 versus $35,313 for females. The per capita income for New Egypt was $18,771. About 5.9% of families and 7.6% of the population were below the poverty line, including 7.8% of those under age 18 and 3.9% of those age 65 or over.

== Transportation ==
NJ Transit provides bus service to Philadelphia on the 317 bus route. New Egypt was a major stop on the Pennsylvania Railroad's Pemberton & Hightstown line; it was abandoned in 1979. The former roadbed was converted in 2010 for rail trail use as the Union Transportation Trail.

== Wineries ==
- Laurita Winery

== Notable people ==
People who were born in, residents of, or otherwise closely associated with New Egypt include:

- Deena Nicole Cortese (born 1987), cast member of MTV's Jersey Shore
- Keith Jones, news anchor and reporter for WCAU in Philadelphia
- Duke Lacroix (born 1993), professional soccer player who plays as a forward for Indy Eleven in the North American Soccer League
- Rocky Marval (born 1965), pairs figure skater who finished 10th at the 1992 Winter Olympics together with partner Calla Urbanski
- Stephen Panasuk (born 1989), quarterback for the Cleveland Gladiators of the Arena Football League
