= Doctors Creek (New Jersey) =

River in New Jersey, United States

Coordinates: 40.1760°N 74.6803°W

Doctors Creek is a stream in the U.S. state of New Jersey. It runs 18.4 miles to the Crosswicks Creek in Hamilton Township from a lake in Millstone Township.
