= Pemberton and Hightstown Railroad =

Map

The Pemberton and Hightstown Railroad was a railroad in the U.S. state of New Jersey.

== History ==
The Pemberton and Hightstown Railroad was chartered in 1864 and completed in 1868; it linked the towns of Pemberton and Hightstown, a total of 24 miles (39 km). The first President of the Pemberton and Hightstown Railroad was Nathaniel Scudder Rue, Jr., who lived in Cream Ridge, NJ (he also founded the first national bank in New Jersey, The First National Bank of Hightstown). Most of the stock was purchased by the Camden and Amboy Railroad, and as such they were the owners of the line. The line was first leased to the Camden and Amboy in 1868, then the PRR through its acquisitions. In 1888 the Union Transportation Company was created to run the line, and the lease was terminated with the PRR, although they still owned the line. In 1915, the PRR merged the Pemberton and Hightstown Railroad into the Pennsylvania and Atlantic Railroad, a holdings company which included other local lines. By 1942, the UT was unable to operate the line, and contracted with the PRR to run the daily operations again. Eventually the PennCentral ran the line until 1976, until the PC merged into Conrail. The Pemberton and Hightstown Railroad, and the Union Transportation Company as operator, was not to be included in Conrail, and thus was independent and on their own. The line lasted until 1977, when due to financial problems, they ceased to exist. The Monmouth County Park System opened a 2.2 miles (3.5 km) section of the Union Transportation Trail (between Millstream Road and Jonathan Holmes Road) with a gravel surface on the right-of-way on September 25, 2010. A 2.0 miles (3.2 km) extension to Davis Station Road was completed in 2011. In February 2015, the section between County Route 526 (New Jersey) and Herbert Road/Sharon Station Road (3.0 miles (4.8 km)) had been completed, with a new parking lot and trailhead at Herbert Road and Sharon Station Road. Construction commenced in 2015 on the fourth segment (1.5 miles (2.4 km)) between County Route 526 (New Jersey) and Davis Station Road, and was completed in September 2016. The fifth segment (0.75 miles (1.21 km)) between Herbert Road/Sharon Station Road and County Route 539 (New Jersey) was completed in late January 2017 and passes through the Assunpink Wildlife Management Area.

== Towns, stations, and facilities ==
The line started in Pemberton, New Jersey, in 1868 where it had a connection with the Burlington and Camden County Railroad (1867). This gave them a connection to Mt. Holly and Camden.

The next stop it passed through was Shreve, which had a passenger shelter measuring 6 by 8 feet (1.8 m × 2.4 m), as well as a smaller milk shelter and platform.

Then Lewistown, where a wye and crossover allowed interchange with the Columbus, Kinkora, Springfield RR (1872). This would become the Kinkora Branch of the PRR many years later. There was a large freight house here, measuring 14 by 23 feet (4.3 m × 7.0 m), as well as Cattle Pen, and storage tracks just south of the wye.

Continuing on, the line ran through Wrightstown, which exploded during World War I when Fort Dix was built. This location had a big wire fence around the station grounds, with two milk platforms (one large, one small), large coal trestle, and a cattle pen. The Wrightstown freight station measured 16 by 40 feet (4.9 m × 12.2 m), while the passenger station measured 16 by 32 feet (4.9 m × 9.8 m).

The line would continue through Cookstown, which included a milk platform and cattle pen, and a 16-by-32-foot (4.9 m × 9.8 m) passenger station, and a 16-by-30-foot (4.9 m × 9.1 m) freight house.

In New Egypt the Union Transportation Company would set up its offices in 1888. New Egypt would house the shops, turntable, and water tower for the UT. The passenger station was the largest on the line, measuring 18 by 50 feet (5.5 m × 15.2 m), while the freight house measured 16 by 60 feet (4.9 m × 18.3 m). The UT's office building measured 38 by 20 feet (11.6 m × 6.1 m). The location had a cattle pen, the Engine house at 31 by 100 feet (9.4 m × 30.5 m), including a large coal trestle and a coal shed, with a locomotive coaling platform, engine pit, and a 55-foot-diameter (17 m) turntable.

Hornerstown would be next, which would also include a turntable. The passenger station was 16 by 32 feet (4.9 m × 9.8 m), as the freight house was 16 by 30 feet (4.9 m × 9.1 m). The complementary cattle pen and milk platform would be included.

Cream Ridge had a wire fence around the property, with a 16-by-32-foot (4.9 m × 9.8 m) passenger station and 16-by-30-foot (4.9 m × 9.1 m) freight house. The complementary cattle pen and milk platform would be included.

Davis also had the cattle pen and milk platform, but only a passenger station, although larger at 16 by 40 feet (4.9 m × 12.2 m). This was considered a combination freight passenger station.

Imlaystown had a slightly smaller passenger station of 16 by 26 feet (4.9 m × 7.9 m), and a freight house of 16 by 30 feet (4.9 m × 9.1 m). Cattle pen included, but no milk platform listed.

Shrewsbury was listed as a stop, which only included a milk platform.

Sharon had the standard 16-by-32-foot (4.9 m × 9.8 m) passenger station and 16-by-30-foot (4.9 m × 9.1 m) freight station, with cattle pen and milk platform.

The last stop before Hightstown, Allens would only include a milk platform.

Hightstown was the final terminus, where they shared the station with the C&A.

== Construction and operations ==
- 1864 - the Burlington and Camden County Railroad had extended their tracks from Mt. Holly to Pemberton by 1868. Milk and Fertilizer (marl) were beginning to become profitable businesses in the surrounding communities in and around the New Egypt area. The Pemberton & Hightstown was granted incorporation by the State of New Jersey on March 24, 1864. The Camden & Amboy RR assisted the P&H in construction of the line.
- 1865 - P&H agrees to lease the line to the C&A, once finished. Construction was started at both ends at the same time, with teams working north from Pemberton and south from Hightstown.
- 1868 - track laying completed on January 16, near Hornerstown, after which the construction crew's celebration became disorderly and a riot broke out. When opened, the line had up to four scheduled passenger trains per day.
- 1871 - the C&A is absorbed into the United Companies, which in turn was absorbed by the Pennsylvania Railroad (PRR). As such, the P&H was officially run under the auspices of the PRR.
- 1872 - George Westinghouse's triple valve air brake system was first used on the Amboy Division of the PRR and tested on the P&H. This system set brakes when the main system was broken or pressure dropped. A test was performed at Pemberton in which two cars were deliberately uncoupled and halted as intended.
- 1874 - Marl surfaced as one of the carrier's first bulk commodities; 14,856 tons are transported by rail to stations on the P&H and the C&A.
- 1887 - the PRR officially purchases the guaranteed stock and bonds of the P&H.
- 1888 - the board of directors of the P&H decided to cancel the lease to PRR for operating purposes and closing all traffic on the P&H with the exception of daily mail service (which they may have been obligated to deliver per US Government agreements). This causes a problem with local residents and industries who were used to regular service for the shipment of milk and other farm products. A few months later, local railroad men and business heads got together to raise enough money and on July 31, 1888 began the Union Transportation Company (UT) with its headquarters in New Egypt, New Jersey. The P&H would now lease the line to the UT for daily operations.
- 1890s - 1900s - uneventful; little change. Mostly mixed train service reported, with a regular routine of LCL freight. Typical freight included milk, cranberries, hay, and straw. Freight extras ran to accommodate excess loading of gravel, and later potato and tomato crops for Campbell's in Camden, New Jersey. The line was never very profitable, with a very high percentage of its revenue coming from passengers. An agreement dated July 31, 1896, sets rental at $1,389 per year, payable to the PRR.
- 1910s - traffic on the UT peaks. Passenger usage is up and LCL freight was going strong. The line was as busy as it was ever going to be at this time period. The local communities were growing and thus increasing the demand for passenger services. Farming was becoming a bit more efficient, increasing the demand for inbound and outbound agricultural products, as well as general merchandise for the industry. The stations were busy, the platforms filled with cattle and milk, and increases in express freight kept things moving at a steady pace.
- 1915 - the PRR merged a number of their local holdings into a larger single corporation to reduce costs and overhead. The P&H, along with the Philadelphia and Long Branch Railroad Company and the Kinkora and New Lisbon Railroad, were merged to form the Pennsylvania and Atlantic Railroad Company. As far as daily operations went, the Union Transportation company was still the lessee and still ran the trains on the P&H part. This merger into the P&A was more of a centralization on the PRR's part, allowing them to consolidate reporting, taxes, and other business functions at the corporate level.
- 1917 - Fort Dix Air Force Base is constructed near Wrightstown; this causes the town of Wrightstown to grow almost overnight. This was initially good for the UT, as some extra business and passengers could now be expected, but the Government and Fort Dix made a deal with the PRR to exclusively give them all freight traffic. The PRR retained trackage rights into Fort Dix over the UT, and the sum of $600 per month was given to the UT for use by the PRR. This is interesting to note, since in 1896, the UT was paying the PRR rent of $1,389 per year for rent
- 1920 - inflation and the loss of freight and passengers begin to takes its toll on the UT. Surrounding roads are better maintained, automobiles become more reliable, and farmer begin to use tractors over horses and other animals; trucks are able to make quicker deliveries. As a result, much of the UTs local traffic began to quickly fade. LCL shipments were down, and every year, fewer and fewer passengers would take the trains. The passenger business was such a high percentage of the UTs traffic, they would never recoup from loss of this business. Traffic still consisted of outbound milk and seasonal potato and tomato loading, but these, too, were on the decline. As an experiment to increase passenger traffic and reduce costs, an early internal combustion J.G. Brill Company doodlebug was bought by the UT around 1922, but this attempt failed. The unit was sold in July 1926.
- 1931 - Great Depression takes its toll on the UT. Passenger service quickly evaporated, and as such, the ICC would allow passenger service to end in 1931. Much of the remaining LCL freight would be ending by this point, leaving both the freight stations and passenger stations now empty and unused. Some would be rented out, but overall, the end of an era would soon be here.
- 1940s - operations of the UT are dismal, with old and dilapidated buildings and equipment. The line was in desperate need of maintenance and upgrades by this point. With the loss of the passenger traffic revenue in the 20s and 30s, the line could barely afford to keep itself running. Based upon freight revenues alone they could not afford to pay for upgrades and improvements now necessary. But by the 1940s, cars were getting bigger and heavier, and something would need to be done. The increase of traffic due to World War II was more than the UT could handle with their existing two ancient 4-4-0 engines, cars, and facilities. The point had come when the UT was unable to reliably and safely service the line.
- 1942 - UT contracts with PRR to operate the line. Of the two old, poorly maintained 4-4-0 American locomotives, one was immediately scrapped.
- 1945 - November: PRR brings in B8 switcher (number 2800). Coal was one of the largest commodities brought into service Fort Dix. Mostly carload freight was being shipped on the line by this point, with almost no need anymore for station and team track facilities. The remaining freight houses were a liability at this point, being very old and needing immediate attention. The freight house at Wrightstown was removed, and in Davis, the combination freight and passenger building was also removed. The Cream Ridge freight house was removed in January 1943. When the PRR took over operations, the much needed upgrades could take place, and the needed maintenance could finally be performed. Much of the line was upgraded from the original 65 lb (29 kg) rail to 85 lb (39 kg) rail, and several bridges were quickly upgraded.
- 1949 - construction of New Jersey Turnpike threatens to sever the line north of Shrewsbury Road four miles (6 km) south of Hightstown. The UT and local shippers tried to fight the break in the ROW, but failed.
- 1951 - segment between Shrewsbury Road and Hightstown abandoned and dismantled.
- Mid-1950s - upper sections of the line continued to be abandoned by the PRR; increased coal shipments to Fort Dix, as well as increased shipments to Richard's Feed Mill at Davis, kept the line moving and profitable.
- 1959 - July 14th marked the last day of revenue service for the Pennsylvania Railroad’s vast steam locomotive program, ending with B6sb shifter #5244 operating under lease to Union Transportation Co. The locomotive was retired the following day in Philadelphia.[3]
- 1960s - full freight carloads continue, with companies such as Sanitary Bedding Company (later Agrico Farm Center), Richard's Feed Mill, and Northern Chemical Company being the largest shippers; line remains successful
- 1967 - coal no longer required in Fort Dix, hurting the line's business.
- 1968 - history nearly repeats itself when the construction of Interstate 195 nearly severs the line, isolating large shipper, Agrico Farm Center. However, New Jersey DOT relents and constructs overpass. The PRR and New York Central merge to become Penn Central (PC). The Penn Central eventually files for bankruptcy less than two years later.
- Early 1970s - line was able to gain some extra revenue as it moved steel for the construction of I-195, as well as some more coal being delivered Fort Dix again. But as quickly as it started, the coal shipments ended, and the PC continued with its abandonment proceedings for most of the line.
- 1973 - two prospects for new business came about. The Stepan Chemical Company and the Cori Furniture Company were both looking for properties with rail access. The stigma of abandonment chased them away from the local area. One can only imagine how the situation would have changed if the Stepan Chemical Company moved in, as their plant in Maywood, New Jersey comprises 19 acres (77,000 m^{2}) with many spurs and sidings. The Final System Plan of 1973, which created Conrail and explained which lines and companies would be included, did not include the UT. Based upon that information, the PC planned to terminate operational service on February 27, 1976. Conrail was not going to help them, or run the trains for them. But, Conrail would continue to service Fort Dix, just as the PRR and PC did.
- 1975 - the PC amended its notice that the UT could continue to operate and transferred the Lewis-Fort Dix segment to the UT and canceled all agreements. Officially, the UT would be on their own again. To secure some funding to continue their operations, the UT tried to gain a subsidy from the United States Railway Association, which offered assistance to shortlines and the such. Operations continued in 1976 and even into 1977, with covered hoppers being delivered to Agrico, Agway at New Egypt, and Kube-Pak (a horticultural greenhouse business) at Imlaystown.
- 1977 - the UT was now working directly with the New Jersey Department of Transportation. The UT was out of cash, out of funding, and out of time. In 1977, NJDOT demanded that consignees come up with the funding to pay for operational losses on the UT. With no funding sources being found the line would have to close, since they could not pay their bills. The last shipment of empties was picked up on March 31, 1977 at Agrico.
- 1978 - Number 9999 was sold to Midwest Steel and Alloy company in Ohio.
- 1979 - line abandoned between stub end at Shrewsbury road and Fort Dix. Conrail would continue to only service Fort Dix, until 1981, using the old PRR trackage rights.
- 1984 - line abandoned between Fort Dix and current terminus of Mount Holly.
