= Plumsted Township, New Jersey =

Township in Ocean County, New Jersey, US

- Township
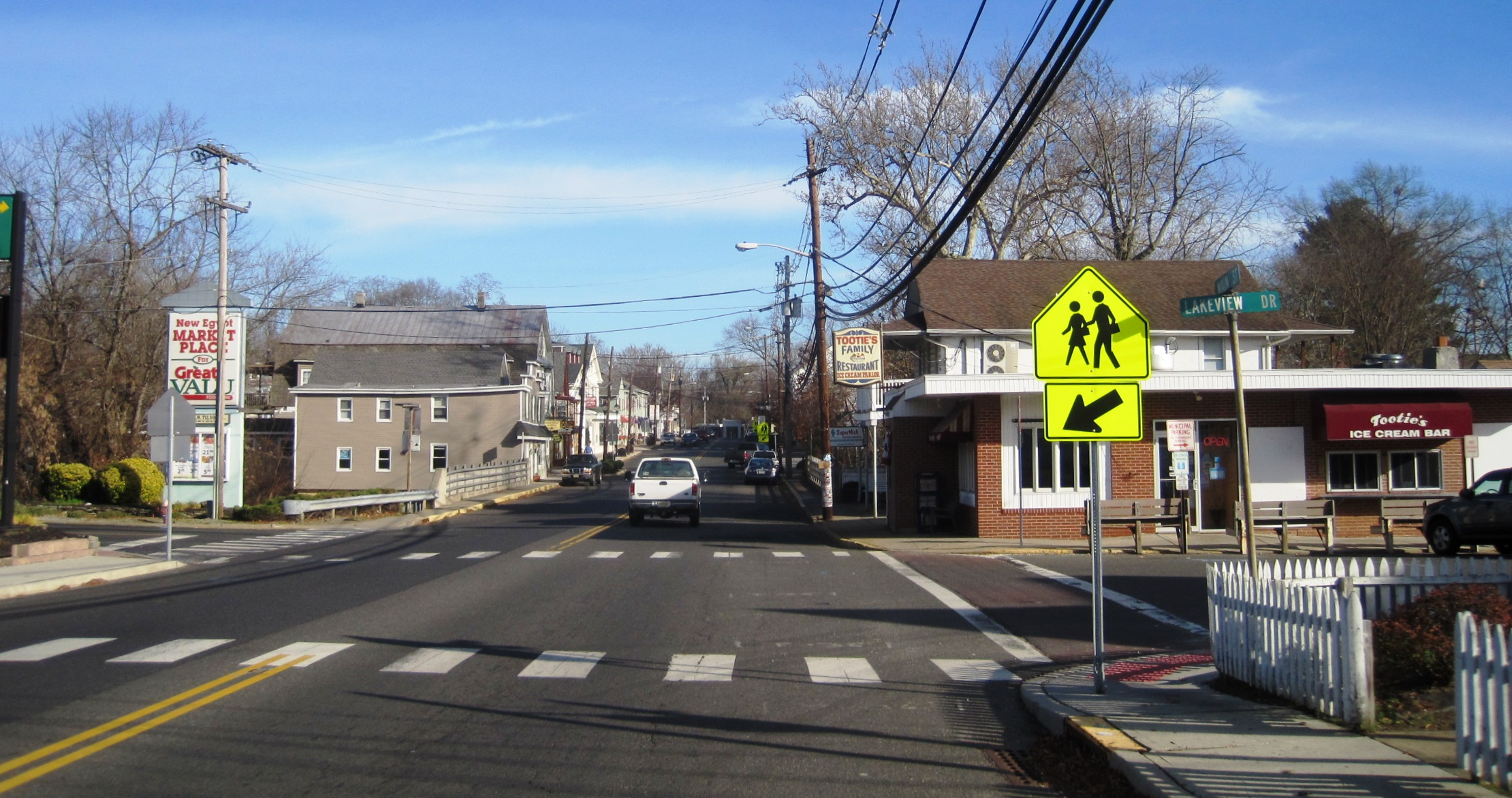
- New Egypt, the township's central business district
- Motto: Pride in Plumsted, the State's Center
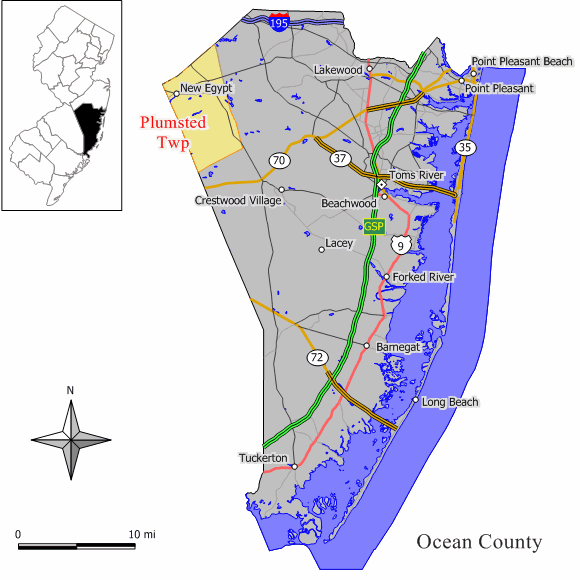
- Map of Plumsted Township in Ocean County. Inset: Location of Ocean County highlighted in the State of New Jersey.

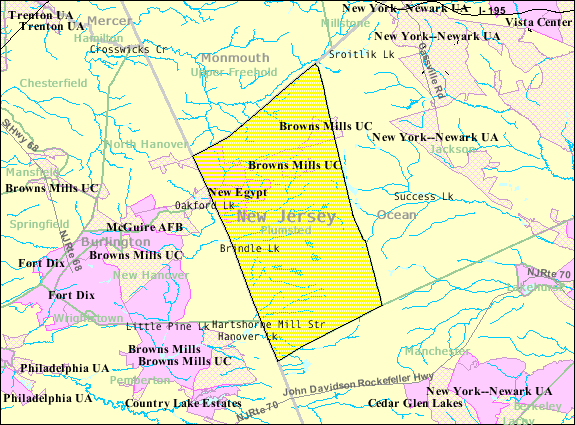
- Census Bureau map of Plumsted Township, New Jersey

- Location in Ocean County Location in New Jersey Location in the United States
- Coordinates: 40.045716°N 74.485245°W
- Country: United States
- State: New Jersey
- County: Ocean
- Incorporated: March 11, 1845

Government
  - Type: Township
  - Body: Township Committee
  - Mayor: James Hagelstein (R, term ends December 31, 2027)
  - Administrator: N/A
  - Municipal clerk: Jennifer Witham

Area
  - Total: 39.53 sq mi (102.37 km^{2})
  - Land: 39.14 sq mi (101.36 km^{2})
  - Water: 0.39 sq mi (1.01 km^{2}) 0.99%
  - Rank: 57th of 565 in state 9th of 33 in county
- Elevation: 105 ft (32 m)

Population (2020)
  - Total: 8,072
  - Estimate (2024): 9,387
  - Rank: 290th of 565 in state 14th of 33 in county
  - Density: 206.2/sq mi (79.6/km^{2})
  - Rank: 501st of 565 in state 32nd of 33 in county
- Time zone: UTC−05:00 (Eastern (EST))
  - Summer (DST): UTC−04:00 (Eastern (EDT))
- ZIP Code: 08533 – New Egypt
- Area code: 609 exchanges: 752, 758
- FIPS code: 3402959790
- GNIS feature ID: 0882078
- Website: www.plumsted.org

Plumsted Township is a township in Ocean County, in the U.S. state of New Jersey. As of the 2020 United States census, the township's population was 8,072, a decrease of 349 (−4.1%) from the 2010 census count of 8,421, which in turn reflected an increase of 1,146 (+15.8%) from the 7,275 counted in the 2000 census. The 2010 population was the highest recorded in any decennial census.

Plumsted Township was incorporated as a township by an act of the New Jersey Legislature on March 11, 1845, from portions of Jackson Township, while the area was still part of Monmouth County. Plumsted Township became part of the newly created Ocean County on February 15, 1850. The township was named for Clement Plumstead, an English Quaker who bought a large parcel of land, but never set foot in the area.

At one time, Plumsted included five separate Superfund sites, four of which have been removed from the National Priorities List.

== Geography ==
According to the United States Census Bureau, the township had a total area of 39.53 square miles (102.37 km^{2}), including 39.14 square miles (101.36 km^{2}) of land and 0.39 square miles (1.01 km^{2}) of water (0.99%).

New Egypt (with a 2020 Census population of 2,357) is an unincorporated community and census-designated place (CDP) located within Plumsted Township.

Unincorporated communities, localities and place names located partially or completely within the township include Archertown, Brindle Park, Head of Woods, Hockamick, Pinehurst Estates and Woodruff.

Colliers Mills Wildlife Management Area is a 12,906.63-acre (5,223.13 ha) wildlife management area located within portions of both Plumsted Township and Jackson Township, operated by the New Jersey Department of Environmental Protection's Division of Fish and Wildlife.

The township borders Jackson Township and Manchester Township in Ocean County; New Hanover Township, North Hanover Township and Pemberton Township in Burlington County; and Upper Freehold Township in Monmouth County.

=== Community ===
The community has a volunteer fire station, a first aid station, and a police department. New Egypt is also home to the Plumsted Branch of the Ocean County Library system.

New Egypt also has seven Christian religious centers including: Assumption Roman Catholic Church, Bible Baptist Church, Church of Christ, Church of the Nazarene, New Egypt United Methodist Church, Plumsted Presbyterian Church, and The Christian Fellowship Church of New Egypt.

Oakford Lake is located in the middle of the town. In the early 1900s, the location thrived as a tourist and vacation attraction. New Egypt has a recreation center with four baseball fields, a football field, two softball fields, a basketball court, and three small fields used for tee ball.

It is home to the New Egypt Speedway.

== Demographics ==
Historical population
Census	Pop.	Note	%±
1850	1,613		—
1860	2,003		24.2%
1870	1,566		−21.8%
1880	1,561		−0.3%
1890	1,327		−15.0%
1900	1,204		−9.3%
1910	1,123		−6.7%
1920	1,276		13.6%
1930	1,215		−4.8%
1940	1,580		30.0%
1950	2,093		32.5%
1960	3,281		56.8%
1970	4,113		25.4%
1980	4,674		13.6%
1990	6,005		28.5%
2000	7,275		21.1%
2010	8,421		15.8%
2020	8,072		−4.1%
2024 (est.)	9,387		16.3%
Population sources: 1850–2000; 1850–1920 1850–1870; 1850 1870 1880–1890; 1890–1910 1910–1930; 1940–2000 2000; 2010 2020

=== 2010 census ===
The 2010 United States census counted 8,421 people, 2,936 households, and 2,311 families in the township. The population density was 212.1 inhabitants per square mile (81.9/km^{2}). There were 3,067 housing units at an average density of 77.2 per square mile (29.8/km^{2}). The racial makeup was 94.19% (7,932) White, 1.81% (152) Black or African American, 0.32% (27) Native American, 0.87% (73) Asian, 0.02% (2) Pacific Islander, 1.24% (104) from other races, and 1.56% (131) from two or more races. Hispanic or Latino of any race were 5.91% (498) of the population.

Of the 2,936 households, 37.4% had children under the age of 18; 64.3% were married couples living together; 9.5% had a female householder with no husband present and 21.3% were non-families. Of all households, 16.8% were made up of individuals and 7.3% had someone living alone who was 65 years of age or older. The average household size was 2.87 and the average family size was 3.22.

26.2% of the population were under the age of 18, 7.3% from 18 to 24, 24.2% from 25 to 44, 30.9% from 45 to 64, and 11.4% who were 65 years of age or older. The median age was 40.9 years. For every 100 females, the population had 100.0 males. For every 100 females ages 18 and older there were 96.1 males.

The Census Bureau's 2006–2010 American Community Survey showed that (in 2010 inflation-adjusted dollars) median household income was $73,790 (with a margin of error of +/− $8,323) and the median family income was $89,279 (+/− $12,381). Males had a median income of $54,614 (+/− $8,958) versus $46,886 (+/− $3,261) for females. The per capita income for the borough was $31,719 (+/− $2,499). About 4.4% of families and 7.3% of the population were below the poverty line, including 11.0% of those under age 18 and 9.6% of those age 65 or over.

=== 2000 census ===
As of the 2000 United States census there were 7,275 people, 2,510 households, and 2,002 families residing in the township. The population density was 181.8 inhabitants per square mile (70.2/km^{2}). There were 2,628 housing units at an average density of 65.7 per square mile (25.4/km^{2}). The racial makeup of the township was 93.90% White, 2.30% African American, 0.14% Native American, 0.73% Asian, 0.01% Pacific Islander, 1.36% from other races, and 1.57% from two or more races. Hispanic or Latino of any race were 3.85% of the population.

There were 2,510 households, out of which 41.1% had children under the age of 18 living with them, 67.0% were married couples living together, 9.3% had a female householder with no husband present, and 20.2% were non-families. 15.9% of all households were made up of individuals, and 5.3% had someone living alone who was 65 years of age or older. The average household size was 2.90 and the average family size was 3.22.

In the township the population was spread out, with 28.5% under the age of 18, 7.1% from 18 to 24, 34.0% from 25 to 44, 22.0% from 45 to 64, and 8.5% who were 65 years of age or older. The median age was 36 years. For every 100 females, there were 99.0 males. For every 100 females age 18 and over, there were 97.1 males.

The median income for a household in the township was $61,357, and the median income for a family was $62,255. Males had a median income of $42,610 versus $34,355 for females. The per capita income for the township was $22,433. About 4.3% of families and 5.0% of the population were below the poverty line, including 5.2% of those under age 18 and 4.2% of those age 65 or over.

== Government ==
=== Local government ===
Plumsted Township is governed under the Township form of New Jersey municipal government, one of 141 municipalities (of the 564) statewide that use this form, the second-most commonly used form of government in the state. The Township Committee is comprised of five members, who are elected directly by the voters at-large in partisan elections to serve three-year terms of office on a staggered basis, with either one or two seats coming up for election each year as part of the November general election. At an annual reorganization meeting held during the first week of January, the Township Committee selects one of its members to serve as Mayor and another as Deputy Mayor, and appoints from its members a liaison for each of the Township's administrative departments.

As of 2025, the members of the Plumsted Township Committee are Mayor Robert W. Bowen (R, term of office on committee and as mayor ends December 31, 2025), Deputy mayor Herbert F. Marinari (R, term on committee ends 2026; term as deputy mayor ends 2025), Leonard A. Grilletto (R, 2026), James Hagelstein (R, 2027) and Thomas Potter (R, 2027).

In February 2023, the township council selected Michael Hammerstone to fill the seat expiring in December 2024 that had been held by Thomas Calabrese. Hammerstone served on an interim basis until the November 2023 general election, when he was elected to serve the balance of the term of office.

In April 2019, the Township Committee appointed Leonard A. Grilletto to fill the seat expiring in December 2020 that had been held by Larry Jones until he resigned from office. In the November 2019 general election, Grilletto was elected to serve the balance of the term of office.

In November 2014, following the resignation of former mayor David Leutwyler, who accepted a position as the township's community development coordinator, the Township Committee selected Vince Lotito from three names recommended by the Republican municipal committee to fill the vacant seat on the committee and chose Jack Trotta to serve as mayor.

=== Federal, state and county representation ===
Plumsted Township is located in the 4th Congressional District and is part of New Jersey's 12th state legislative district.

For the 119th United States Congress, New Jersey's 4th congressional district is represented by Chris Smith (R, Manchester Township). New Jersey is represented in the United States Senate by Democrats Cory Booker (Newark, term ends 2027) and Andy Kim (Moorestown, term ends 2031).

For the 2026–2027 session, the 12th legislative district of the New Jersey Legislature is represented in the State Senate by Owen Henry (R, Old Bridge Township) and in the General Assembly by Robert D. Clifton (R, Matawan) and Alex Sauickie (R, Jackson Township).

Ocean County is governed by a Board of County Commissioners composed of five members who are elected on an at-large basis in partisan elections and serving staggered three-year terms of office, with either one or two seats coming up for election each year as part of the November general election. At an annual reorganization held in the beginning of January, the board chooses a director and a deputy director from among its members. As of 2025, Ocean County's Commissioners (with party affiliation, term-end year and residence) are:

John P. Kelly (R, 2025, Eagleswood Township), Virginia E. Haines (R, 2025, Toms River), Robert Arace (R, Manchester Township, 2027) Jennifer Bacchione (R, Berkeley Township, 2027) and Frank Sadeghi (R, 2026, Toms River).

Constitutional officers elected on a countywide basis are: Clerk Scott M. Colabella (R, 2025, Barnegat Light), Sheriff Michael G. Mastronardy (R, 2025; Toms River) and Surrogate Jeffrey Moran (R, 2028, Beachwood).

=== Politics ===
As of March 2011, there were a total of 4,979 registered voters in Plumsted Township, of which 816 (16.4%) were registered as Democrats, 1,537 (30.9%) were registered as Republicans and 2,623 (52.7%) were registered as Unaffiliated. There were 3 voters registered Libertarians or Greens. Among the township's 2010 Census population, 59.1% (vs. 63.2% in Ocean County) were registered to vote, including 80.1% of those ages 18 and over (vs. 82.6% countywide).

Gubernatorial election results for Plumsted Township
Year	Republican		Democratic		Third party(ies)	
Year	No.	%	No.	%	No.	%
2025	2,828	66.95%	1,377	32.60%	19	0.45%
2021	2,393	75.70%	744	23.54%	24	0.76%
2017	1,682	68.65%	685	27.96%	83	3.39%
2013	1,828	75.95%	528	21.94%	51	2.12%
2009	1,917	70.97%	615	22.77%	169	6.26%
2005	1,623	64.71%	750	29.90%	135	5.38%

In the 2012 presidential election, Republican Mitt Romney received 59.3% of the vote (2,179 cast), ahead of Democrat Barack Obama with 38.9% (1,428 votes), and other candidates with 1.8% (67 votes), among the 3,709 ballots cast by the township's 5,262 registered voters (35 ballots were spoiled), for a turnout of 70.5%. In the 2008 presidential election, Republican John McCain received 56.7% of the vote (2,192 cast), ahead of Democrat Barack Obama with 40.7% (1,573 votes) and other candidates with 1.7% (65 votes), among the 3,865 ballots cast by the township's 5,176 registered voters, for a turnout of 74.7%. In the 2004 presidential election, Republican George W. Bush received 63.2% of the vote (2,268 ballots cast), outpolling Democrat John Kerry with 35.2% (1,264 votes) and other candidates with 0.9% (43 votes), among the 3,589 ballots cast by the township's 4,812 registered voters, for a turnout percentage of 74.6.

Presidential Elections Results
Year	Republican	Democratic	Third Parties
2024	69.3% 3,643	28.6% 1,502	2.1% 96
2020	66.7% 3,159	31.0% 1,468	3.3% 98
2016	68.1% 2,683	27.2% 1,072	4.7% 184
2012	59.3% 2,179	38.9% 1,428	1.8% 67
2008	56.7% 2,192	40.7% 1,573	1.7% 65
2004	63.2% 2,268	35.2% 1,264	0.9% 43

In the 2013 gubernatorial election, Republican Chris Christie received 75.9% of the vote (1,828 cast), ahead of Democrat Barbara Buono with 21.9% (528 votes), and other candidates with 2.1% (51 votes), among the 2,459 ballots cast by the township's 5,219 registered voters (52 ballots were spoiled), for a turnout of 47.1%. In the 2009 gubernatorial election, Republican Chris Christie received 70.2% of the vote (1,917 ballots cast), ahead of Democrat Jon Corzine with 22.5% (615 votes), Independent Chris Daggett with 4.6% (125 votes) and other candidates with 1.6% (44 votes), among the 2,732 ballots cast by the township's 5,075 registered voters, yielding a 53.8% turnout.

United States Senate election results for Plumsted Township1
Year	Republican		Democratic		Third party(ies)	
Year	No.	%	No.	%	No.	%
2024	3,293	67.14%	1,552	31.64%	60	1.22%
2018	2,215	70.14%	810	25.65%	133	4.21%
2012	2,018	59.60%	1,293	38.19%	75	2.22%
2006	1,465	63.56%	742	32.19%	98	4.25%

United States Senate election results for Plumsted Township2
Year	Republican		Democratic		Third party(ies)	
Year	No.	%	No.	%	No.	%
2020	3,073	67.49%	1,357	29.80%	123	2.70%
2014	1,251	67.29%	548	29.48%	60	3.23%
2013	1,080	71.90%	402	26.76%	20	1.33%
2008	2,139	61.38%	1,268	36.38%	78	2.24%

== Education ==
The Plumsted Township School District educates students in public school for pre-kindergarten though twelfth grade. As of the 2024–25 school year, the district, comprised of three schools, had an enrollment of 1,192 students and 95.2 classroom teachers (on an FTE basis), for a student–teacher ratio of 12.5:1. Schools in the district (with 2024–25 enrollment data from the National Center for Education Statistics) are New Egypt Primary School with 177 students in grades PreK–K, Dr. Gerald H. Woehr Elementary School with 490 students in grades 1–6 and New Egypt High School with 509 students in grades 7–12.

== Transportation ==
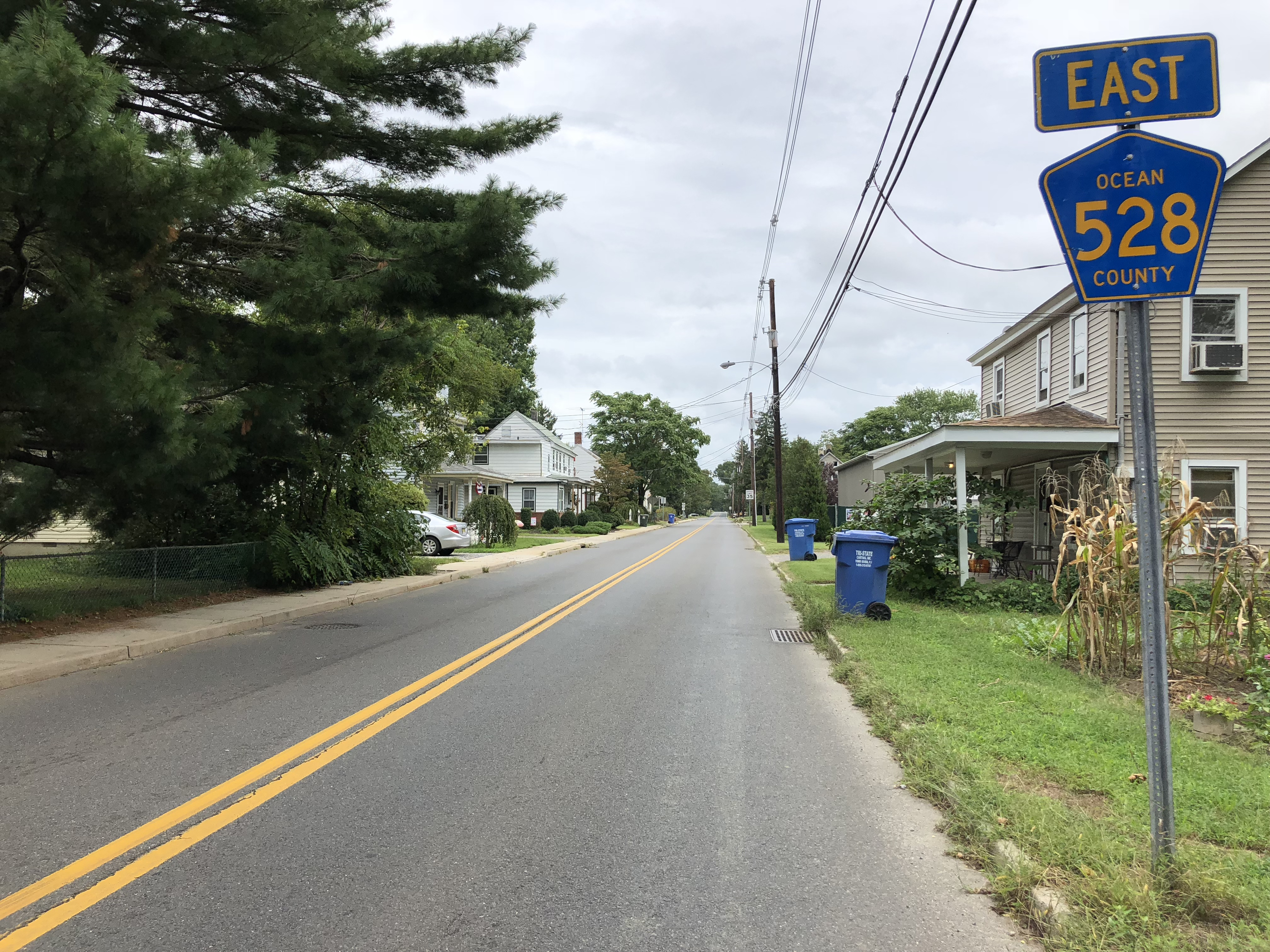
County Route 528 eastbound in Plumsted Township

=== Roads and highways ===
As of May 2010, the township had a total of 73.76 miles (118.71 km) of roadways, of which 35.89 miles (57.76 km) were maintained by the municipality and 37.87 miles (60.95 km) by Ocean County.

The only major roads that pass through are county routes, such as County Route 528, County Route 537 along the northern border with Upper Freehold Township and County Route 539, which traverses more than 8 miles (13 km) north / south across the township in its eastern section.

The closest limited access road is Interstate 195, which is accessible in neighboring Upper Freehold Township and Jackson Township.

=== Public transportation ===
NJ Transit provides bus service between the township and Philadelphia on the 317 bus route.

Ocean Ride local service is provided on the Shoppers Loop route.

== Wineries ==
- Laurita Winery

== Communications ==
Plumsted is the only municipality in Ocean County that receives a different Comcast cable feed which is out of Mount Holly, Burlington County. This means that for local broadcast channels, Plumsted receives stations from the Philadelphia area and does not receive any New York City stations.

In addition, Plumsted has local telephone calling with Bordentown, Fort Dix and Pemberton in Burlington County, as well as Allentown in Monmouth County, but not with any exchanges in Ocean County.

== Notable people ==
People who were born in, residents of, or otherwise closely associated with Plumsted Township include:

- Deena Nicole Cortese (born 1987), reality television personality who appeared on the MTV reality show Jersey Shore
- Ronald S. Dancer (1949–2022), member of the New Jersey General Assembly who served as mayor of Plumsted Township from 1990 to 2011
- Stanley Dancer (1927–2005), harness racing driver and trainer
- George Franklin Fort (1809–1872), physician, judge and politician who served as the 16th Governor of New Jersey from 1851 to 1854
- Keith Jones, news anchor and reporter for WCAU in Philadelphia
- Duke Lacroix (born 1993), professional soccer player who plays as a forward for Indy Eleven in the North American Soccer League
- Edgar O. Murphy (1878–1959), politician who served as Mayor of Farmingdale, New Jersey and as a member of the Monmouth County Board of Chosen Freeholders
- Stephen Panasuk (born 1989), quarterback for the Cleveland Gladiators of the Arena Football League
- Travis Ward (born 1996), soccer player who plays as a forward for Michigan Stars FC in the National Independent Soccer Association
