= Pemberton Rail-Trail =

Path in New Jersey

Coordinates: 39.971508°N 74.683449°W

Kinkora-Pemberton Rail-Trail

The Pemberton Rail-Trail is a rail trail in Pemberton, New Jersey.

It occupies a 3.0-mile (4.8 km) abandoned rail corridor in Burlington County, New Jersey, that extends from Hanover Street in Pemberton to Birmingham Road in Juliustown, New Jersey. The trail surface is stone dust, typical of rail-trail construction.

The Kinkora-Pemberton rail-trail is planned to extend the Pemberton rail-trail to Florence Township, New Jersey.
