= Nitro (Six Flags Great Adventure) =

Steel roller coaster

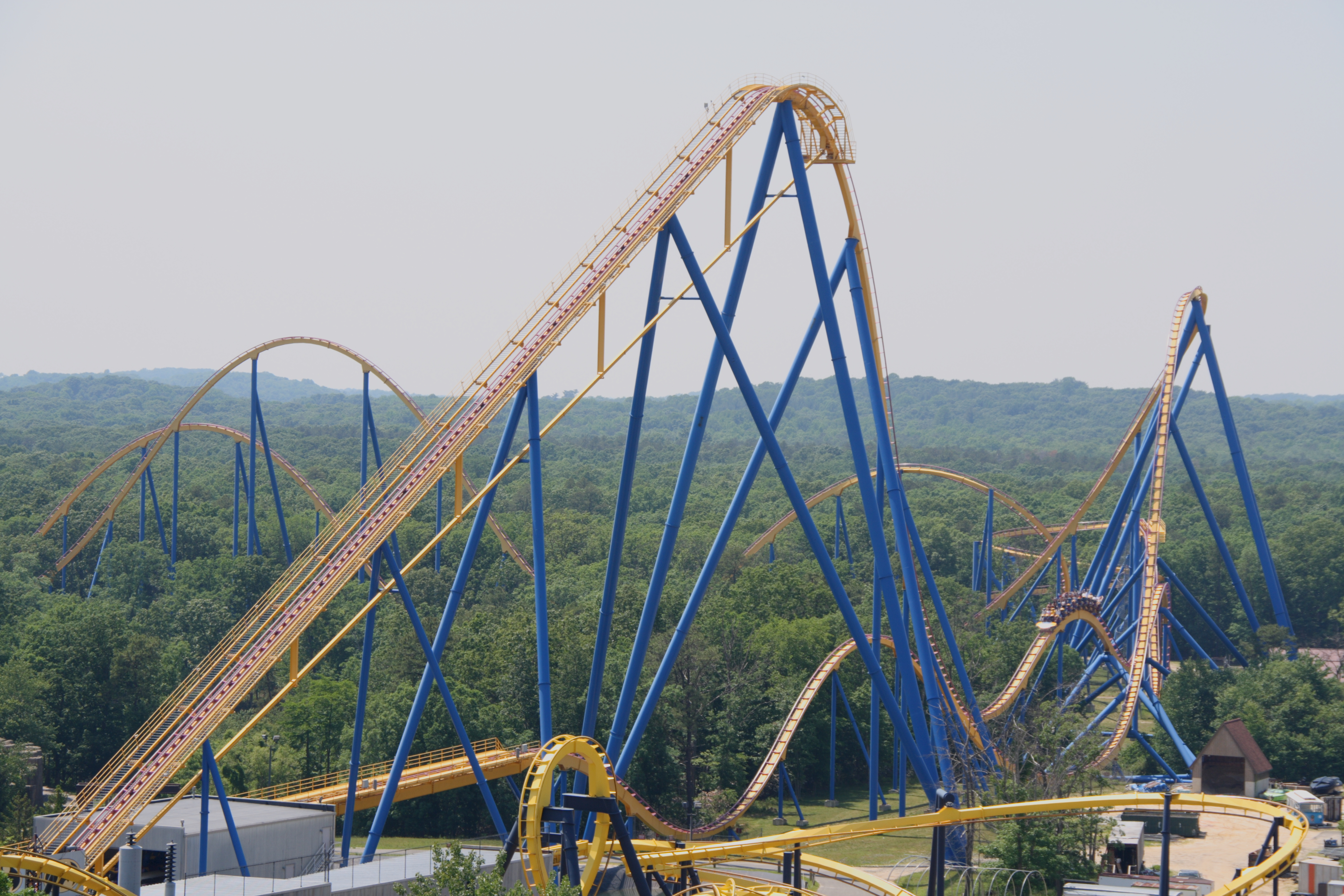
- Nitro's overview with Batman the Ride in the foreground

Six Flags Great Adventure
- Location: Six Flags Great Adventure
- Park section: The Pine Barrens
- Coordinates: 40°08′8.30″N 74°26′39.74″W
- Status: Operating
- Opening date: April 7, 2001
- Cost: $20,000,000

General statistics
- Type: Steel
- Manufacturer: Bolliger & Mabillard
- Model: Hyper Coaster
- Track layout: L-shaped Out and Back
- Lift/launch system: Chain lift hill
- Height: 230 ft (70 m)
- Drop: 215 ft (66 m)
- Length: 5,394 ft (1,644 m)
- Speed: 80 mph (130 km/h)
- Inversions: 0
- Duration: 2:20
- Max vertical angle: 68°
- Capacity: 1800 riders per hour
- G-force: 4.3
- Height restriction: 54 in (137 cm)
- Trains: 3 trains with 9 cars; riders arranged 4 across in a single row for a total of 36 riders per train
- Fast Lane available
- Nitro at RCDB

Nitro is a steel roller coaster located at Six Flags Great Adventure in Jackson Township, New Jersey. Manufactured by Bolliger & Mabillard, the Hyper Coaster model opened to the public on April 7, 2001. Since its debut, Nitro has consistently ranked high among steel coasters in the annual Golden Ticket Awards from Amusement Today, peaking in third place during its tenure.

== History ==
In August 2000, land preparation of a new attraction began right behind some maintenance buildings. Several concrete footers were being poured in September. The construction was visible from the patio of the Captain Jack's restaurant. Workers continued to work in the forest and the shores of Prospertown Lake. Vertical construction began in December 2000 and the new attraction would cover 6 acres (2.4 ha) of land.

On February 1, 2001, Six Flags Great Adventure confirmed that the new attraction would be named Nitro and be a hypercoaster. The ride would be the third Bolliger & Mabillard roller coaster at the park, with the other two being Batman: The Ride and Medusa. Billed as the most explosive coaster on the planet, it would be the largest single investment in 27 years.

Nitro was completed on time, opening to the general public at the start of the 2001 season on April 7. Four days later on April 11, the park hosted a special event. Former WWE wrestler Mick Foley slid down the handle of a detonator as fireworks exploded above the queue line and one of the trains exited the station.

== Ride experience ==
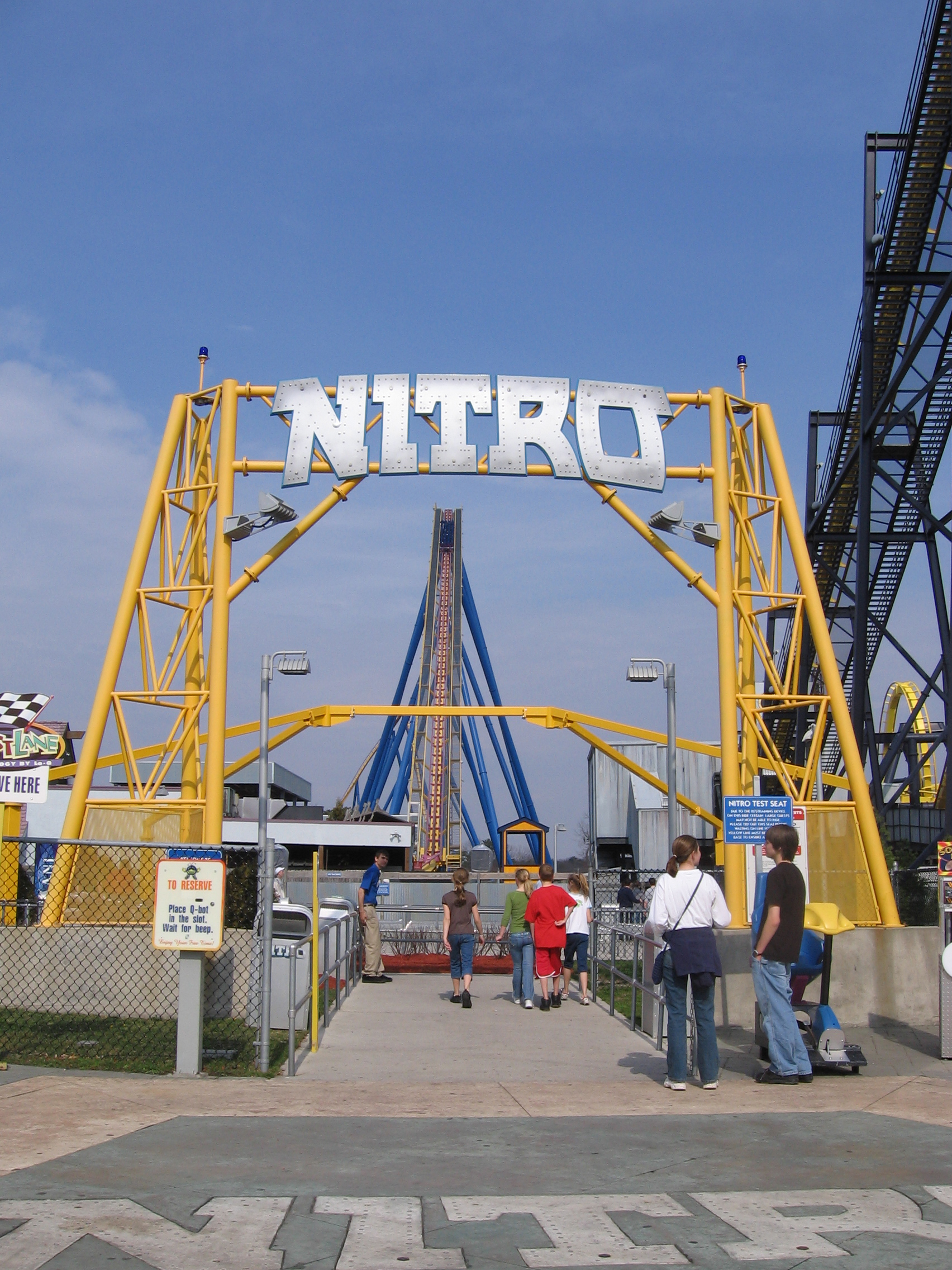
Nitro's entrance sign with lift hill in background

=== Layout ===
After leaving the station, the train makes a left U-turn and ascends a 230-foot-tall (70 m) lift hill. After cresting the top, the train drops 215 feet (66 m) at a 68-degree angle, reaching a maximum speed of 80 mph (130 km/h). The train then ascends a 189-foot-tall (58 m) hill and dives down to the left, coasting over another large airtime hill. Afterwards, Nitro enters an element known as a hammerhead turn, a tight U-turn, which veers to the right. Traveling over another camelback hill, Nitro enters its S-curve and into the 540-degree helix. After the mid course brake run, Nitro travels over three camelback hills, followed by a final brake run before returning to the station.

=== Trains ===
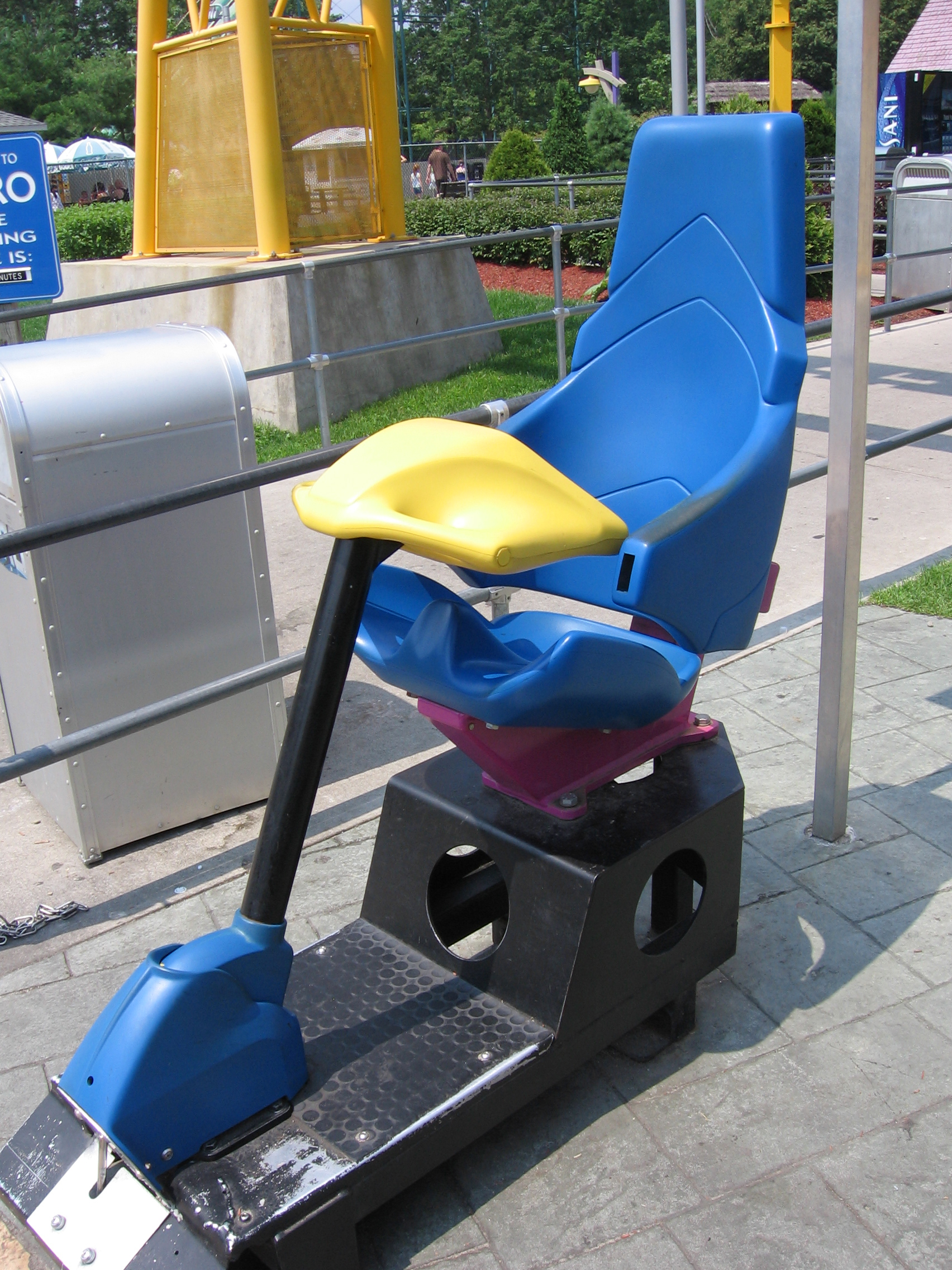
Nitro's test seat

Nitro operates with three open-air steel and fiberglass trains with individual lap bar restraints. Each train has nine cars with riders arranged four across in a single row for a total of 36 riders per train.

=== Track ===
The steel track is 5,394 feet (1,644 m) in length and the height of the lift is approximately 230 feet (70 m). It was manufactured by Clermont Steel Fabricators located in Batavia, Ohio.

== Rankings ==
Golden Ticket Awards: Top steel Roller Coasters
Year									1998	1999
Ranking									–	–
Year	2000	2001	2002	2003	2004	2005	2006	2007	2008	2009
Ranking	–	14	4	6	6	5	4	3	3	3
Year	2010	2011	2012	2013	2014	2015	2016	2017	2018	2019
Ranking	3	3	3	4	5	5	5	7	11	10
Year	2020	2021	2022	2023	2024	2025	2026			
Ranking	N/A	14	21	20	35 (tie)	33	31			

NAPHA Survey: Favorite Steel Roller Coaster
Year	2005	2006
Ranking	4 (Note: Tied with Phantom's Revenge at Kennywood.)	5

== Incidents ==
In the summer of 2014, on a Friday afternoon, Nitro passengers found themselves stuck part way up the first 230-foot high hill of the ride. Six Flags park officials say a power outage to the ride was to blame. No one was injured as a result of the stoppage. Ride operators climbed up, helped the passengers out of their seats, and down the stairs, NBC News reported.

On Sunday, July 11, 2021, Nitro was temporarily suspended after a complaint was made that a restraining lap bar had unfastened on one of the trains. Following this guest concern, the ride was closed for a few hours. After the three coaster trains were thoroughly inspected by Six Flags' maintenance team and the ride was found to be operating without any safety concerns regarding the lap bar situation, Nitro was reopened with the other two trains.

Six Flags temporarily shut down Nitro and eight other similar roller coasters across six parks nationwide on October 13, 2026 following a fatal incident at Six Flags Over Georgia.
