= Whitesville, New Jersey =

Whitesville, New Jersey may refer to:

- Whitesville, Monmouth County, New Jersey
- Whitesville, Ocean County, New Jersey
