= Rova Farms =

Russian community in New Jersey

View of the Rova Farms community center from a 1939 postcard.

Rova Farms was a Russian-American cooperative colony and vacation resort established in 1934 on a heavily wooded 1,440 acres (580 ha) of land located near Cassville, Jackson Township, New Jersey. Launched by a membership organization called the Russian Consolidated Mutual Aid Society (ROOVA), Rova Farms served as a cultural center for the Russian-speaking population of New York, New Jersey, and Pennsylvania for more than half a century before atrophying and dissolving as the original generation of Russian émigrés aged and passed from the scene.

== History ==
=== Establishment ===
The Russian Consolidated Mutual Aid Society, commonly known by its Russian-language acronym of ROOVA, was a mutual-benefit society of Russian émigrés established in 1926 with headquarters in Philadelphia. ROOVA was at the time one of the largest Russian-language membership organizations, with branches spread across the United States and Canada, and sought to fulfill multiple objectives by establishing a network of farms for its members, providing a home and shelter for its aging members, and establishing a culturally-friendly summer resort in the countryside for its city-bound members.

ROOVA implemented this plan to simultaneously fulfil multiple functions in May 1934 with the purchase of a 1,440 acre parcel of heavily wooded land in the New Jersey Pine Barrens, with a view to subdivision of the land into agricultural strips for purchase by the group's members. The land in question was originally held by early settlers in the area, the Van Hise family, and included a farmhouse constructed in 1870, a store, and a mill pond created when a local creek was dammed for a family sawmill. Purchase price of the tract was later reported as $20,000 (equivalent to $480,000 in 2025).

The moniker of the project was adapted from ROOVA to Rova Farms due to a consensus that the sound of the name was more pleasant. The project was conceived as the foundation stone for establishment of a future Russian town, with initial plans calling for construction of an auditorium, gymnasium, library, boating pier on the mill pond, and sports fields.

A grand opening ceremony was held on July 22, 1934, with 125 chartered buses bringing in an estimated 5,000 people from throughout the Northeast for the festivities. The gathering was addressed by New Jersey Secretary of State Thomas A. Mathis, Jacob Winslow of the Russian Consolidated Mutual Aid Society, and a host of state and local politicians.

=== Expansion ===
Title page of a Russian translation of a book by Karl Kautsky bearing the library stamp of the Rova Farms "L.N. Tolstoy Library."

By the time of its twelfth anniversary in 1946, a substantial resort had been created, with 22 cottages constructed, providing 150 rooms for guests, with an additional bunkhouse capable of sleeping 50 children on site. The fetid millpond had been completely drained, cleaned, and enlarged with a dock for boaters and swimmers constructed. A 5,600-square-foot (520 m^{2}) community center featuring a stage and dance floor had been erected, and foundations laid for other buildings — the actual construction of which was delayed by the wartime shortage of building materials.

The St. Vladimir's Day Festival, held on the last Sunday of July, had once attracted as many as 50,000 visitors, which had declined to several hundred by 2010.

=== Decline and dissolution ===
After abandonment of the enclave, all of the historic buildings at Rova Farms were demolished.

=== Repurposing the site ===
In January 2024, Jackson Township mayor Michael Reina announced the launch of a project to redevelop the former Rova Farms site as a "state-of-the-art passive recreation area" with a fishing pier and boat launch at Cassville Lake. Plans for the new park included a picnic pavilion, playground, walking path, and scenic overlook.
