= Harmony, Ocean County, New Jersey =

Populated place in Ocean County, New Jersey, US

Harmony, New Jersey
- Unincorporated community
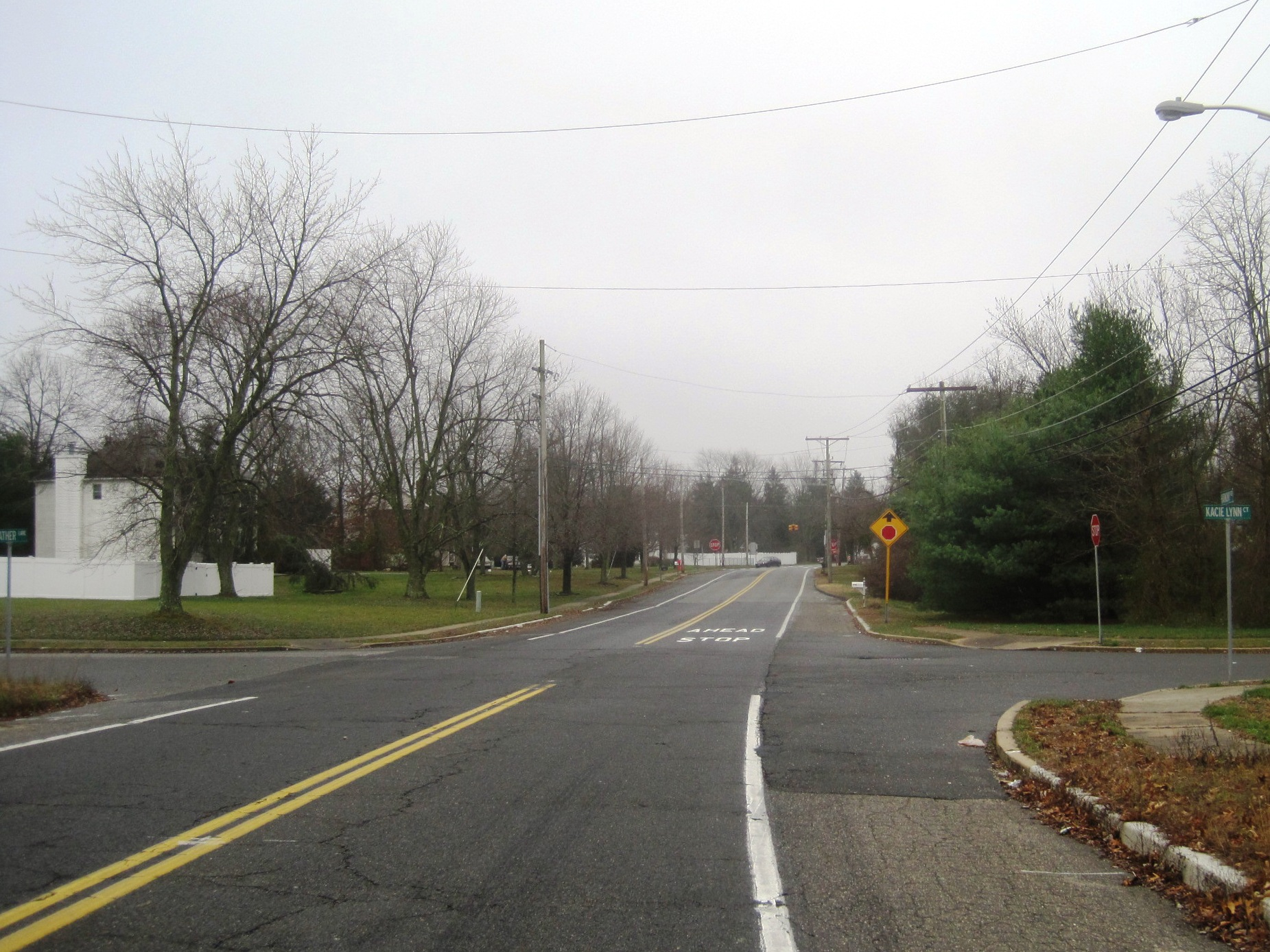
- Looking south on Harmony Road approaching Hyson Road

- Harmony's location in Ocean County (Inset: Ocean County in New Jersey) Harmony, New Jersey (New Jersey) Harmony, New Jersey (the United States)
- Coordinates: 40°09′07″N 74°18′03″W
- Country: United States
- State: New Jersey
- County: Ocean
- Township: Jackson
- Elevation: 157 ft (48 m)
- ZIP Code: 08527
- GNIS feature ID: 0876955

Harmony is an unincorporated community located within Jackson Township, in Ocean County, in the U.S. state of New Jersey.

Harmony is located near exit 22 on Interstate 195 and is also located near County Route 526 (County Line Road). Originally the area was largely rural with a mix of farms, forest, and some houses along arterial road but by the late 1990s/early 2000s, housing developments were built and the area is now mostly suburban.
