= Prospertown, New Jersey =

Populated place in Monmouth County, New Jersey, US

- Unincorporated community
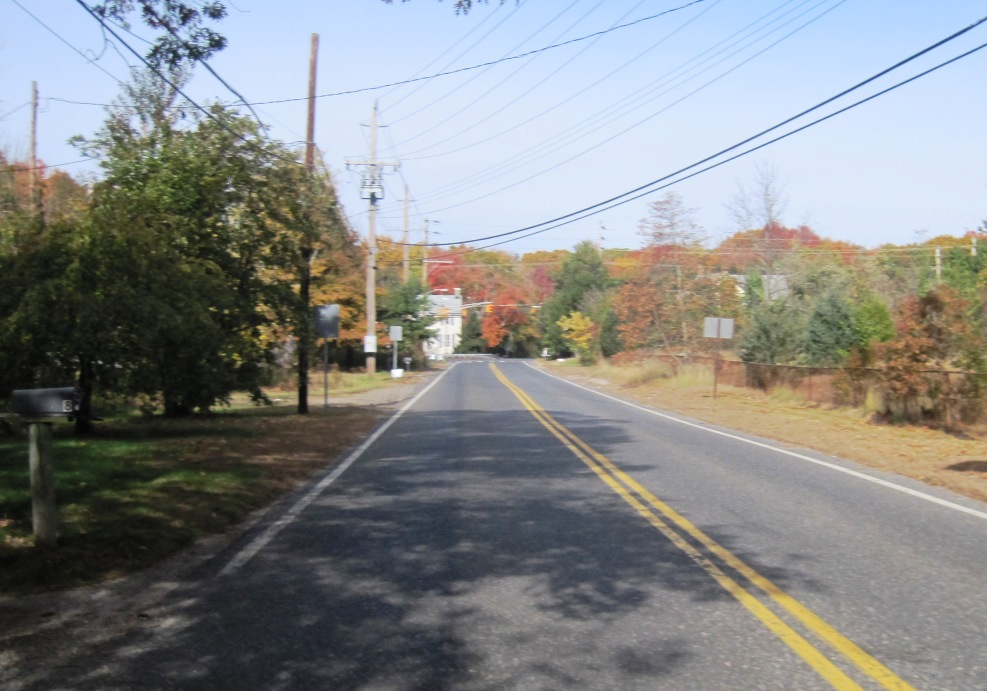
- Looking north along Hawkin Road (CR 640)

- Location of Prospertown in Monmouth County Inset: Location of county within the state of New Jersey Location of Prospertown in Ocean County Inset: Location of county within the state of New Jersey Location of Prospertown in New Jersey Location of Propspertown in the United States
- Coordinates: 40°07′43″N 74°28′11″W
- Country: United States
- State: New Jersey
- Counties: Monmouth, Ocean
- Townships: Jackson, Plumsted, Upper Freehold
- Elevation: 105 ft (32 m)
- ZIP Code: 08514
- GNIS feature ID: 0879507

Prospertown is an unincorporated community located within the New Jersey townships of Jackson and Plumsted in Ocean County and Upper Freehold in Monmouth County. The community is home to Prospertown Lake and is adjacent to Six Flags Great Adventure, both located on Monmouth Road (CR 537). The center of the community is located at the intersection of CR 537, Hawkin Road (CR 640 on the Ocean County side of CR 537), and Emleys Hill Road (on the Monmouth County side). Most of the area consists of pine forests (as the area is located in the northern reaches of the Pine Barrens) but there are some homes along the roads in the area.

Prospertown was once a settlement, consisting of a hotel, several homes, and a gristmill.
