= Prospertown Lake =

Lake in New Jersey, USA

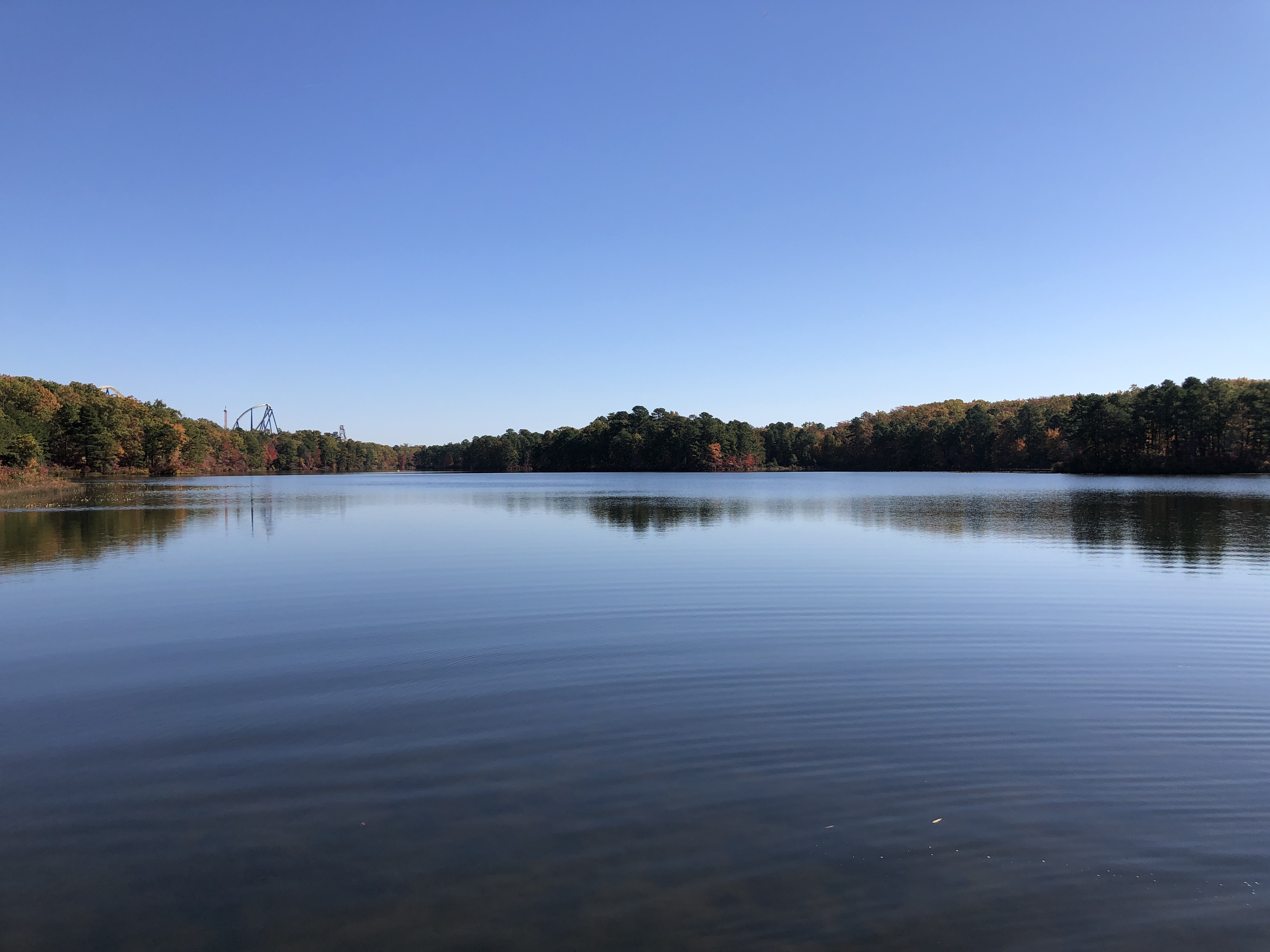
- Prospertown Lake in October 2024; Nitro is located in the background to the left

- Location within New Jersey
- Location: Ocean County, New Jersey
- Coordinates: 40.1347°N 74.4529°W
- Type: man-made lake
- Average depth: 14 feet (4.3 m)

Prospertown Lake is a man-made lake and wildlife management area, located on Monmouth Road (CR 537) in the Prospertown section of Jackson, New Jersey, adjacent to Six Flags Great Adventure.

In September 2011, a 27-year-old metal gate water control structure for an earthen dam on the west side of the lake gave way after Hurricane Irene and other storms struck the area. This caused the lake to drain and the New Jersey Department of Environmental Protection promptly relocated thousands of fish to another body of water nearby. The structure was repaired and the lake refilled and restocked with fish by March 2013. The lake is normally 14 feet (4.3 m) deep.
