= Vista Center, New Jersey =

Populated place in Ocean County, New Jersey, US

- Census-designated place
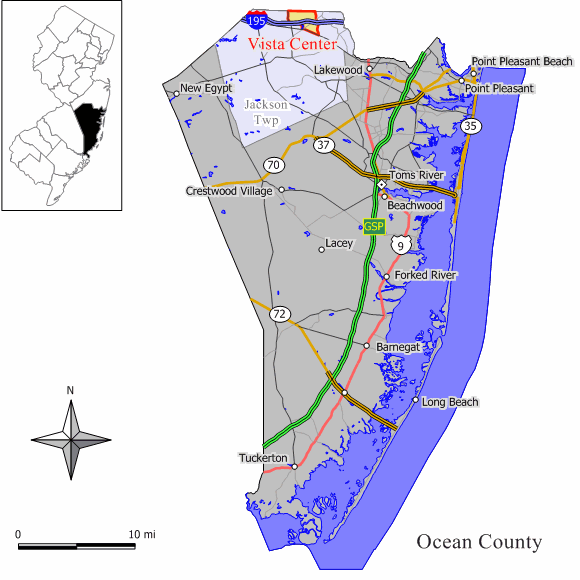
- Map of Vista Center highlighted within Ocean County. Inset: Location of Ocean County in New Jersey.

- Location in Ocean County Location in New Jersey Location in the United States
- Coordinates: 40.158303°N 74.324246°W
- Country: United States
- State: New Jersey
- County: Ocean
- Township: Jackson

Area
  - Total: 3.39 sq mi (8.77 km^{2})
  - Land: 3.36 sq mi (8.70 km^{2})
  - Water: 0.031 sq mi (0.08 km^{2}) 1.15%
- Elevation: 118 ft (36 m)

Population (2020)
  - Total: 2,370
  - Density: 705.6/sq mi (272.45/km^{2})
- Time zone: UTC−05:00 (Eastern (EST))
  - Summer (DST): UTC−04:00 (Eastern (EDT))
- Area code: 732
- FIPS code: 34-76107
- GNIS feature ID: 02390441

Vista Center is an unincorporated community and census-designated place (CDP) located within Jackson Township in Ocean County, in the U.S. state of New Jersey. As of the 2020 census, Vista Center had a population of 2,370.

== Geography ==
According to the United States Census Bureau, the CDP had a total area of 3.427 square miles (8.88 km^{2}), including 3.388 square miles (8.77 km^{2}) of land and 0.039 square miles (0.10 km^{2}) of water (1.15%).

== Demographics ==
Historical population
Census	Pop.	Note	%±
2000	541		—
2010	2,095		287.2%
2020	2,370		13.1%
Sources: 1950 1960 1970; 1980 1990 2000; 2010

Vista Center first appeared as a census designated place in the 2000 U.S. census.

=== Racial and ethnic composition ===
Vista Center CDP, New Jersey – Racial and ethnic composition Note: the US Census treats Hispanic/Latino as an ethnic category. This table excludes Latinos from the racial categories and assigns them to a separate category. Hispanics/Latinos may be of any race.
Race / Ethnicity (NH = Non-Hispanic)	Pop 2000	Pop 2010	Pop 2020	% 2000	% 2010	% 2020
White alone (NH)	474	1,855	1,956	87.62%	88.54%	82.53%
Black or African American alone (NH)	20	69	67	3.70%	3.29%	2.83%
Native American or Alaska Native alone (NH)	1	2	1	0.18%	0.10%	0.04%
Asian alone (NH)	8	54	62	1.48%	2.58%	2.62%
Native Hawaiian or Pacific Islander alone (NH)	0	0	1	0.00%	0.00%	0.04%
Other race alone (NH)	0	2	21	0.00%	0.10%	0.89%
Mixed race or Multiracial (NH)	4	3	48	0.74%	0.14%	2.03%
Hispanic or Latino (any race)	34	110	214	6.28%	5.25%	9.03%
Total	541	2,095	2,370	100.00%	100.00%	100.00%

=== 2020 census ===
As of the 2020 census, Vista Center had a population of 2,370. The median age was 66.4 years. 9.8% of residents were under the age of 18 and 52.5% were 65 years of age or older. For every 100 females there were 89.6 males, and for every 100 females age 18 and over there were 87.1 males.

90.6% of residents lived in urban areas, while 9.4% lived in rural areas.

There were 1,005 households, of which 12.4% had children under the age of 18 living in them. Of all households, 69.8% were married-couple households, 8.9% were households with a male householder and no spouse or partner present, and 17.7% were households with a female householder and no spouse or partner present. About 18.2% of all households were made up of individuals and 14.8% had someone living alone who was 65 years of age or older.

There were 1,055 housing units, of which 4.7% were vacant. The homeowner vacancy rate was 0.9% and the rental vacancy rate was 0.0%.

=== 2010 census ===
The 2010 United States census counted 2,095 people, 875 households, and 743 families in the CDP. The population density was 618.3 people per square mile (238.7 people/km^{2}). There were 948 housing units at an average density of 279.8 units per square mile (108.0 units/km^{2}). The racial makeup was 93.60% (1,961) White, 3.29% (69) Black or African American, 0.10% (2) Native American, 2.58% (54) Asian, 0.00% (0) Pacific Islander, 0.24% (5) from other races, and 0.19% (4) from two or more races. Hispanic or Latino of any race were 5.25% (110) of the population.

Of the 875 households, 14.2% had children under the age of 18; 79.8% were married couples living together; 3.9% had a female householder with no husband present and 15.1% were non-families. Of all households, 11.2% were made up of individuals and 4.9% had someone living alone who was 65 years of age or older. The average household size was 2.39 and the average family size was 2.57.

12.1% of the population were under the age of 18, 3.9% from 18 to 24, 13.4% from 25 to 44, 38.5% from 45 to 64, and 32.1% who were 65 years of age or older. The median age was 59.7 years. For every 100 females, the population had 96.3 males. For every 100 females ages 18 and older there were 93.5 males.

=== 2000 census ===
As of the 2000 United States census there were 541 people, 170 households, and 143 families living in the CDP. The population density was 60.5 people/km^{2} (157 people/mi^{2}). There were 173 housing units at an average density of 19.4 units/km^{2} (50 units/mi^{2}). The racial makeup of the CDP was 91.31% White, 4.44% African American, 0.18% Native American, 1.48% Asian, 0.55% from other races, and 2.03% from two or more races. Hispanic or Latino of any race were 6.28% of the population.

There were 170 households, out of which 45.3% had children under the age of 18 living with them, 72.9% were married couples living together, 7.1% had a female householder with no husband present, and 15.3% were non-families. 8.2% of all households were made up of individuals, and 3.5% had someone living alone who was 65 years of age or older. The average household size was 3.18 and the average family size was 3.42.

In the CDP the population was spread out, with 28.8% under the age of 18, 7.6% from 18 to 24, 36.4% from 25 to 44, 21.4% from 45 to 64, and 5.7% who were 65 years of age or older. The median age was 36 years. For every 100 females, there were 103.4 males. For every 100 females age 18 and over, there were 100.5 males.

The median income for a household in the CDP was $100,337, and the median income for a family was $101,125. Males had a median income of $50,156 versus $25,938 for females. The per capita income for the CDP was $29,620. None of the families and 1.1% of the population were living below the poverty line, including no under eighteens and none of those over 64.
