= Colliers Mills Wildlife Management Area =

Protected area in New Jersey, United States

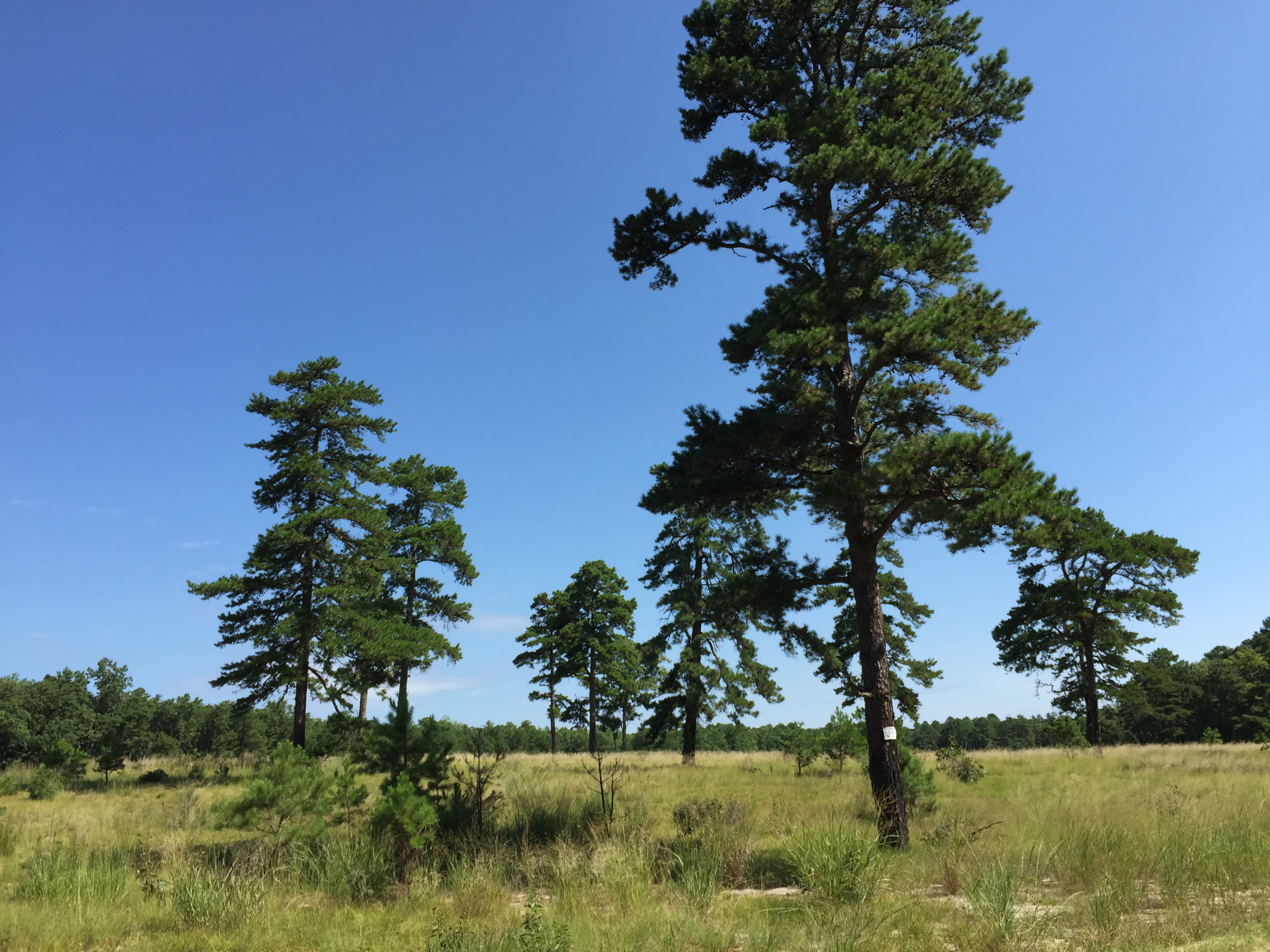

- Location within Ocean County, New Jersey
- Location: Jackson and Plumsted townships, Ocean County, New Jersey
- Coordinates: 40.066695°N 74.409958°W
- Area: 12,906.63 acres (5,223.13 ha)
- Governing body: New Jersey Division of Fish and Wildlife

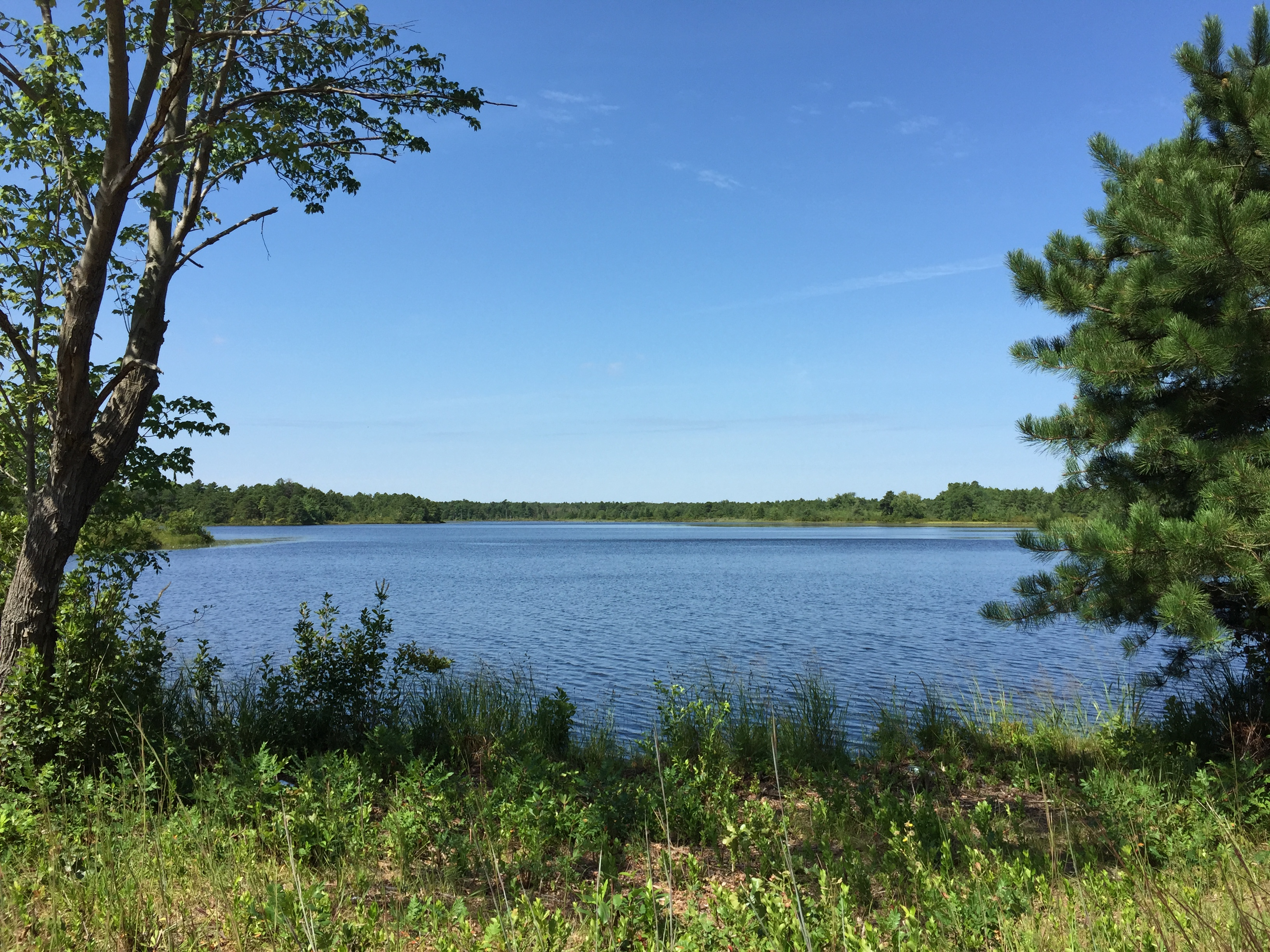
View west across Success Lake from the vicinity of the dam within the Colliers Mills Wildlife Management Area

Colliers Mills Wildlife Management Area is a 12,906.63-acre (5,223.13 ha) wildlife management area located within Jackson and Plumsted townships, Ocean County, New Jersey. Success Lake is located within the management area. The area is part of the New Jersey Pinelands National Reserve.

Colliers Mills made headlines when it became an accidental destination for Waze navigation users heading to Atlantic City in January 2020.
