= Cassville Crossroads Historic District =

Historic district in New Jersey, United States

- U.S. National Register of Historic Places
- U.S. Historic district
- New Jersey Register of Historic Places
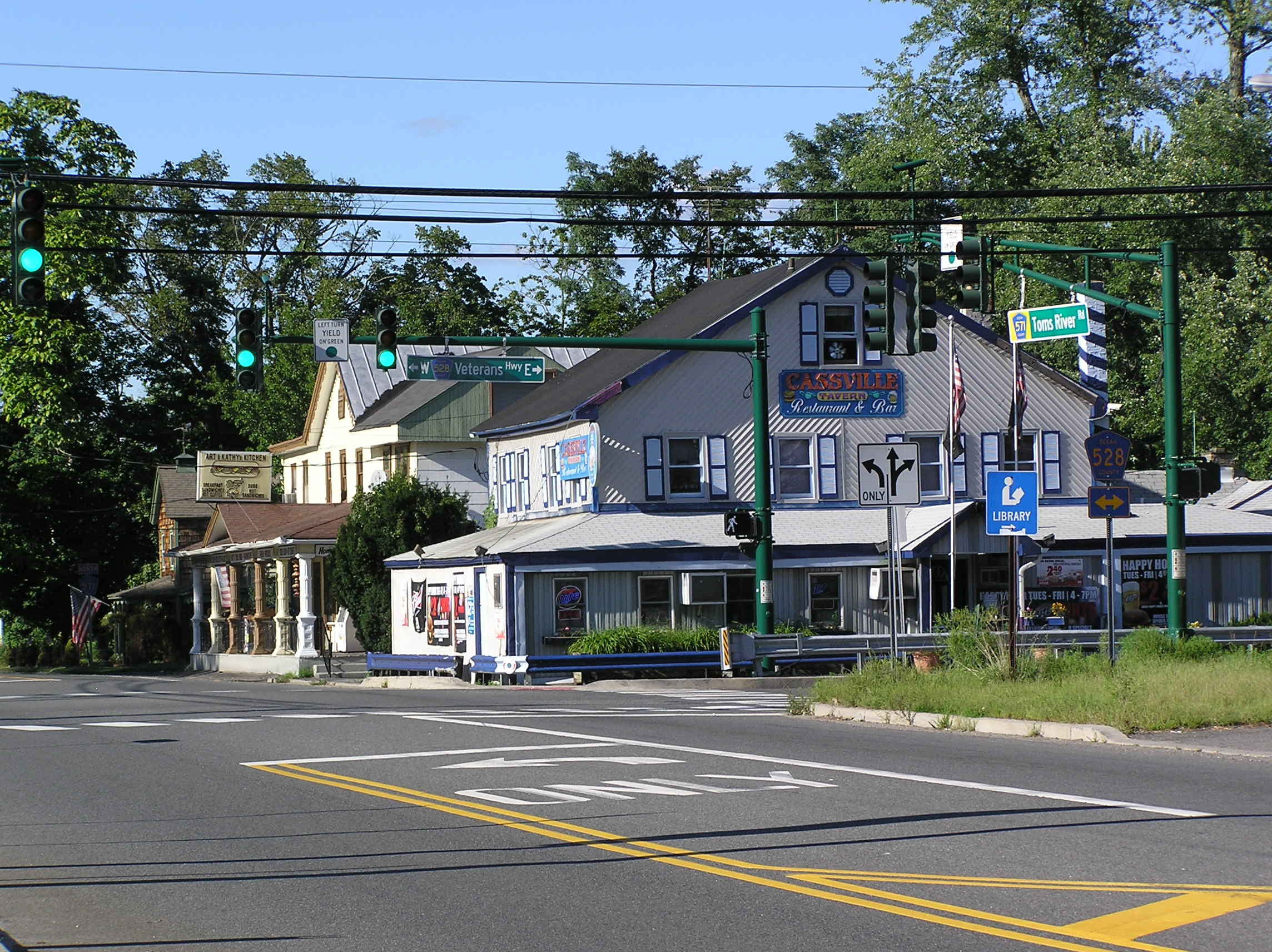
- Cassville Tavern at the crossroads, in 2012

- Location within Ocean County, New Jersey Location within New Jersey Location within the United States
- Location: Junction of CR 571 and CR 528; Jackson Township, New Jersey
- Coordinates: 40°06′17″N 74°23′14″W
- Area: 0.5 acres (0.20 ha)
- Architect: Multiple
- Architectural style: Greek Revival, Georgian, Gothic Revival
- MPS: Cassville MRA
- NRHP reference No.: 82003291
- NJRHP No.: 2300

Significant dates
- Added to NRHP: August 26, 1982
- Designated NJRHP: June 25, 1982

The Cassville Crossroads Historic District is a historic district located in the community of Cassville, at the junction of CR 571 and CR 528, in Jackson Township, Ocean County, New Jersey. The district was added to the National Register of Historic Places on August 26, 1982 for its significance in agriculture, architecture, art, commerce and religion. It includes nine contributing buildings and one contributing structure.

== Gallery of contributing properties ==
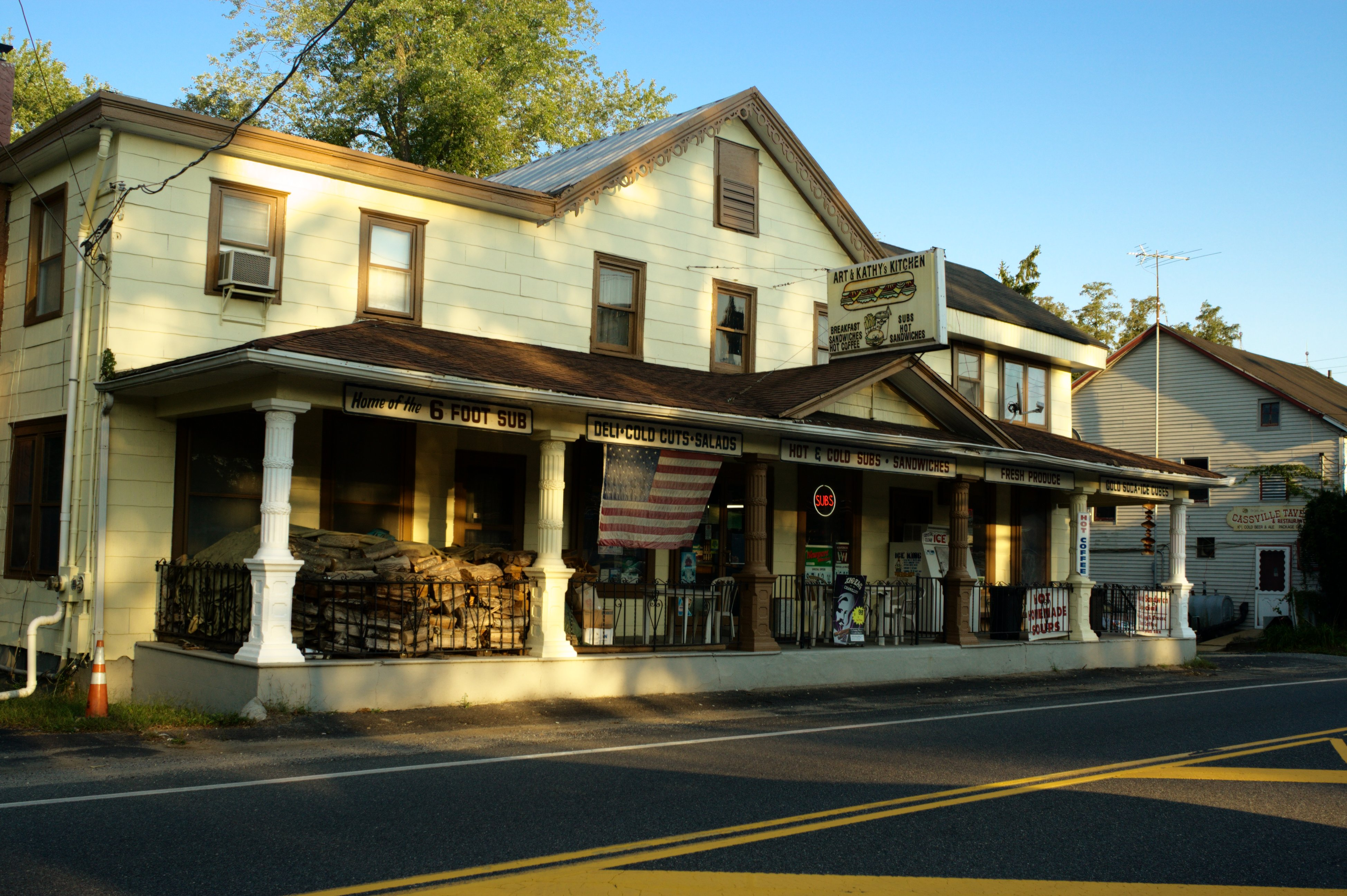
General Store

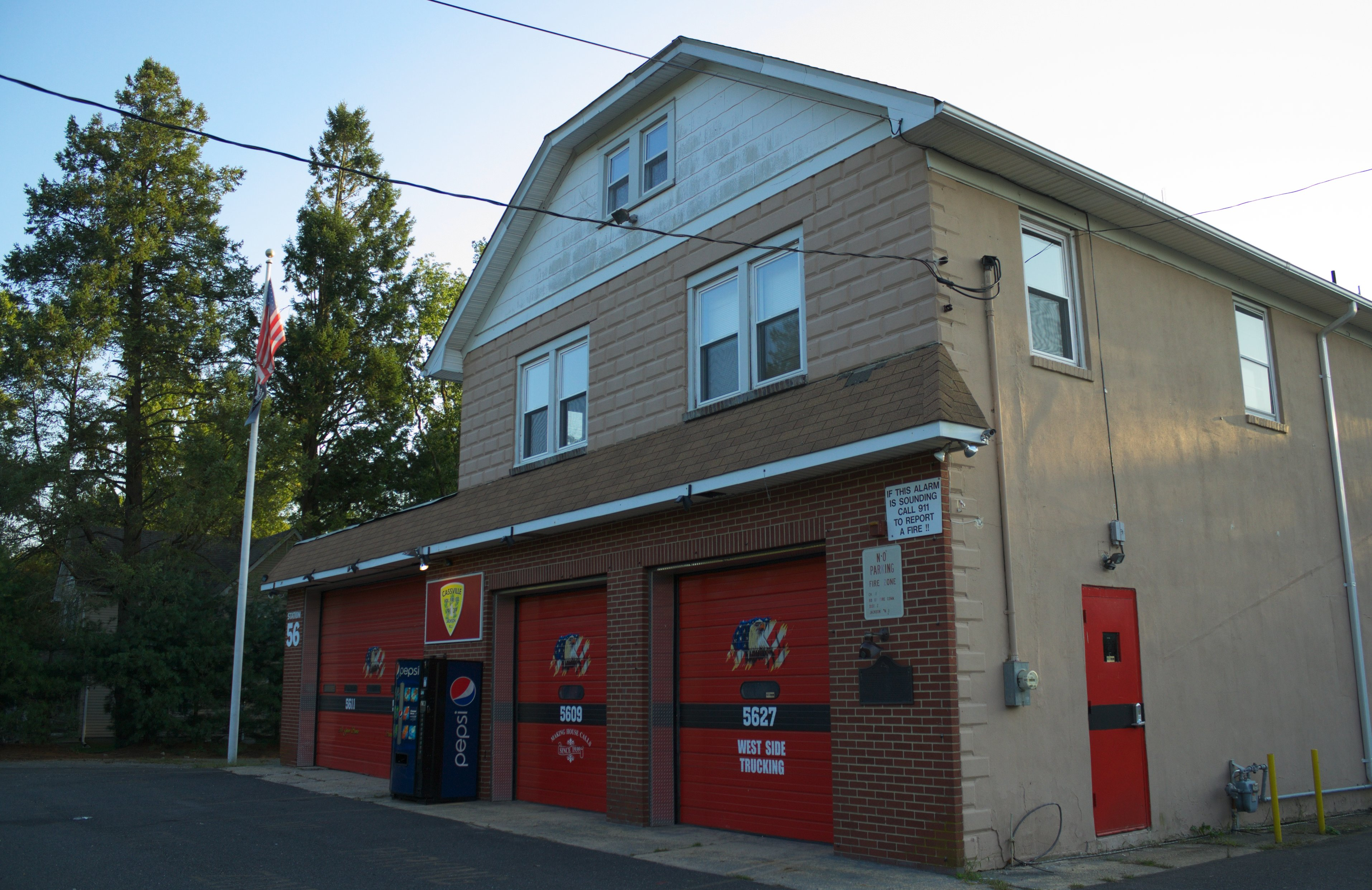
Cassville Fire Station
