= Success Lake =

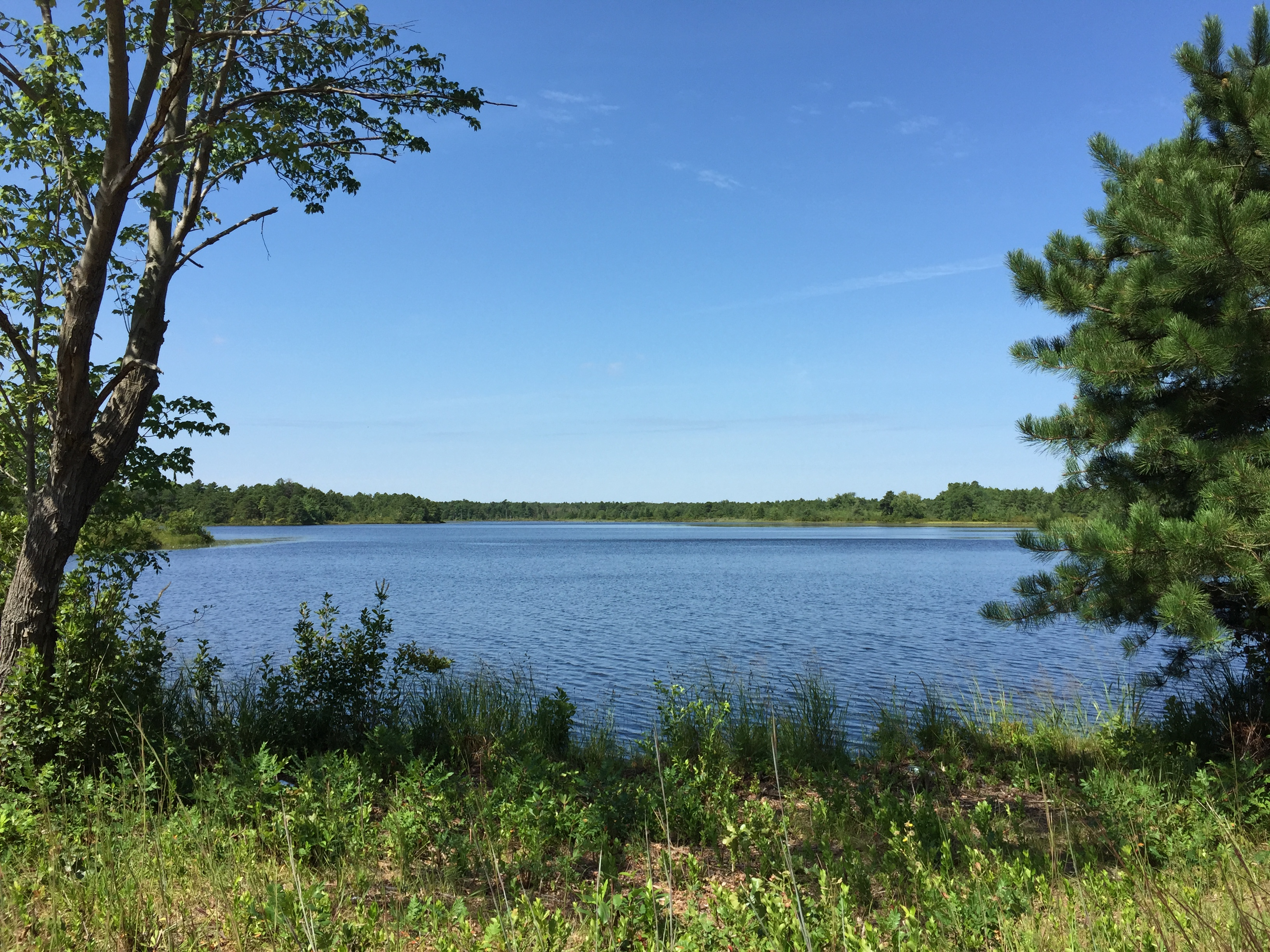
- View west from near the dam

- Location in New Jersey Success Lake (New Jersey) Success Lake (the United States)
- Location: Jackson Township, New Jersey
- Coordinates: 40°03′31″N 74°23′50″W
- Type: Reservoir
- Basin countries: United States
- Surface elevation: 92 feet (28 m)

Success Lake is a man-made lake within Colliers Mills Wildlife Management Area in Jackson Township, Ocean County, New Jersey, United States.

The lake is accessible only through rutted sandy roads. In January 2020, a location error on a Waze advertisement led numerous travelers intending to go to the Borgata in Atlantic City to get trapped on the roads leading to the lake.
