= Jackson Township, New Jersey =

Township in Ocean County, New Jersey, US

- Township
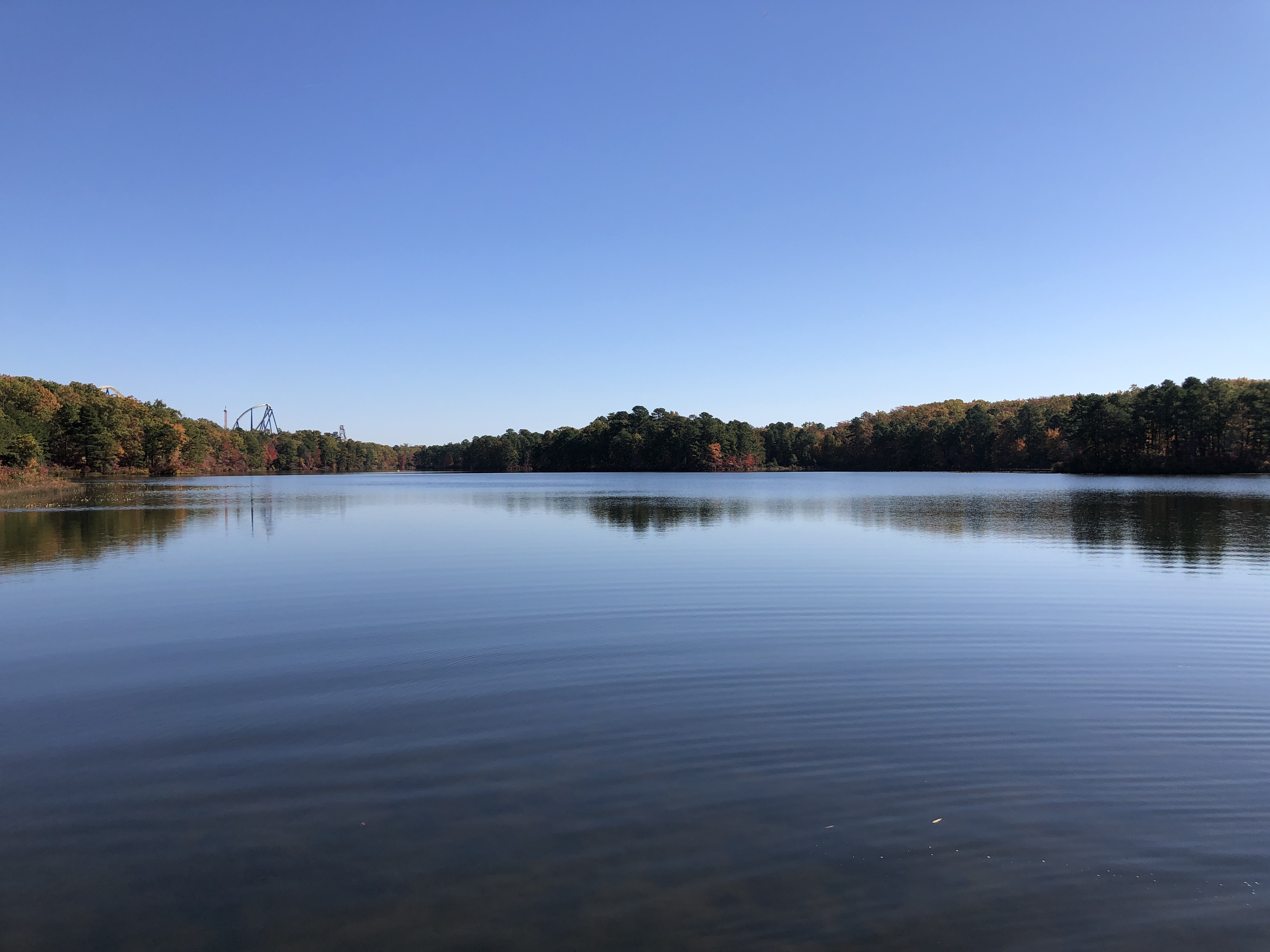
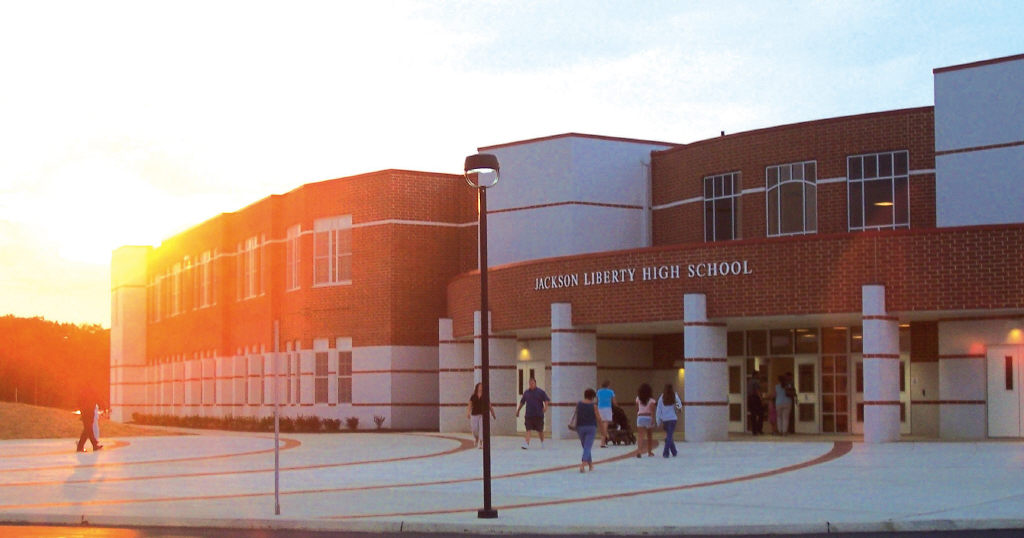
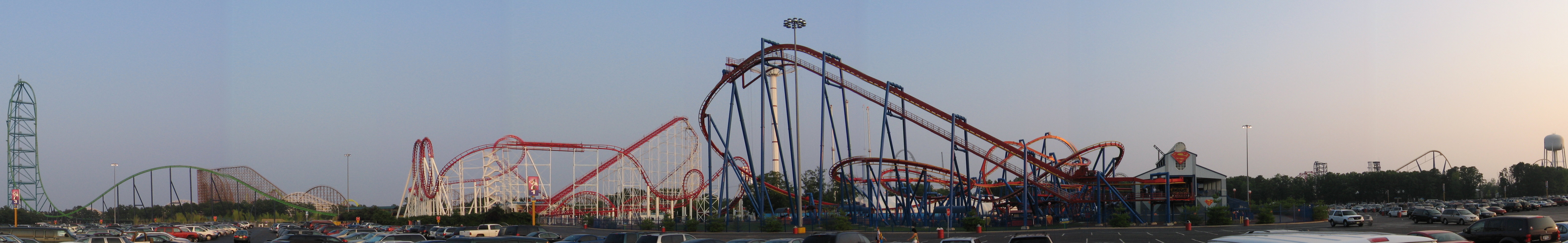
- Prospertown Lake Jackson Township High School Six Flags Great Adventure

- Seal
- Motto: A Place for All Seasons
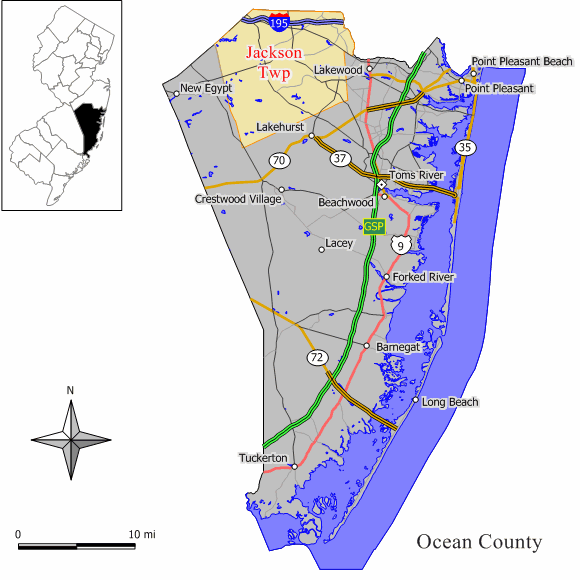
- Location of Jackson Township in Ocean County highlighted in yellow (right). Inset map: Location of Ocean County in New Jersey highlighted in black (left).

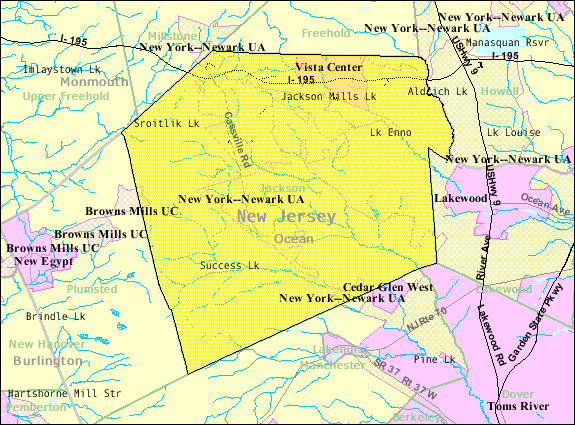
- Census Bureau map of Jackson Township, New Jersey
- Interactive map of Jackson Township, New Jersey
- Location in Ocean County Location in New Jersey Location in the United States
- Coordinates: 40.090928°N 74.361269°W
- Country: United States
- State: New Jersey
- County: Ocean
- Incorporated: March 6, 1844
- Named for: Andrew Jackson

Government
  - Type: Faulkner Act (mayor–council)
  - Body: Township Council
  - Mayor: Jennifer L. Kuhn (term ends December 31, 2026) Mayor elect - Elliott Shem-Tov
  - Administrator: Charles Terefenko
  - Municipal clerk: Sandra Martin

Area
  - Total: 100.55 sq mi (260.43 km^{2})
  - Land: 99.17 sq mi (256.86 km^{2})
  - Water: 1.38 sq mi (3.57 km^{2}) 1.37%
  - Rank: 4th of 565 in state 1st of 33 in county
- Elevation: 118 ft (36 m)

Population (2020)
  - Total: 58,544
  - Estimate (2025): 61,281 ▲
  - Rank: 29th of 565 in state 4th of 33 in county
  - Density: 618/sq mi (239/km^{2})
  - Rank: 433rd of 565 in state 26th of 33 in county
- Time zone: UTC−05:00 (Eastern (EST))
  - Summer (DST): UTC−04:00 (Eastern (EDT))
- ZIP Code: 08527
- Area code: 732
- FIPS code: 3402934680
- GNIS feature ID: 0882079
- Website: jacksontwpnj.net

Jackson Township is a township in Ocean County, in the U.S. state of New Jersey. A portion of the township is located within the Pinelands National Reserve. As of the 2020 United States Census, the township's population was 58,544, an increase of 3,688 (+6.7%) from the 2010 census count of 54,856, which in turn reflected an increase of 12,040 (+28.1%) from the 42,816 counted in the 2000 census.

Roughly equidistant between New York City and Philadelphia, along with being close to the state capital of Trenton and the Jersey Shore on Interstate 195, Jackson is an outer-ring suburb of New York City within the New York metropolitan area. Jackson is also the site of the Six Flags Great Adventure Resort complex, which includes the Six Flags Great Adventure theme park, Hurricane Harbor New Jersey water park, and Wild Safari Adventure safari park. The township is also home to Adventure Crossing, a mixed-use entertainment complex that opened in 2023.

== History ==
Jackson Township was incorporated as a township by an act of the New Jersey Legislature on March 6, 1844, from portions of Dover Township (now Toms River Township), Freehold Township and Upper Freehold Township, while the area was still part of Monmouth County. The Township was named for President Andrew Jackson, a year before his death. It became part of the newly created Ocean County on February 15, 1850. Portions of the Township were taken to form Plumsted Township on March 11, 1845.

The surnames of the first 25 families who settled in this town were Allen, Applegate, Benit (Bennett), Bills, Burdon (Borden) - a 1665 patentee, Buckelew, Cheeseman - a 1665 patentee, Henderson, Holman - a 1665 patentee, Hulse, Hyerse (Heyers), Johnstone, and Johnson, Perrino, Reynolds, Van Hise, and White.

Starting around 1920, the cranberry and other agricultural industries started to grow. It would remain like this until 1955 when the Federal Government terminated its subsidizing of chicken grain.

Rova Farms was a Russian-American cooperative colony and vacation resort established in 1934 on a heavily wooded 1,440 acres (580 ha) of land located near Cassville. Launched by a membership organization called the Russian Consolidated Mutual Aid Society (ROOVA), Rova Farms served as a cultural center for the Russian-speaking population.

Starting with an average of 100 new homes per year in the late 1950s, new homes built per year in the 1960s increased to an average of 750. And the 1970s to 1980s to more than a thousand units per year. From 1961 to 1966, 3,000 new children enrolled in the local elementary schools, and despite the recession of 1989-90, this trend still continued.

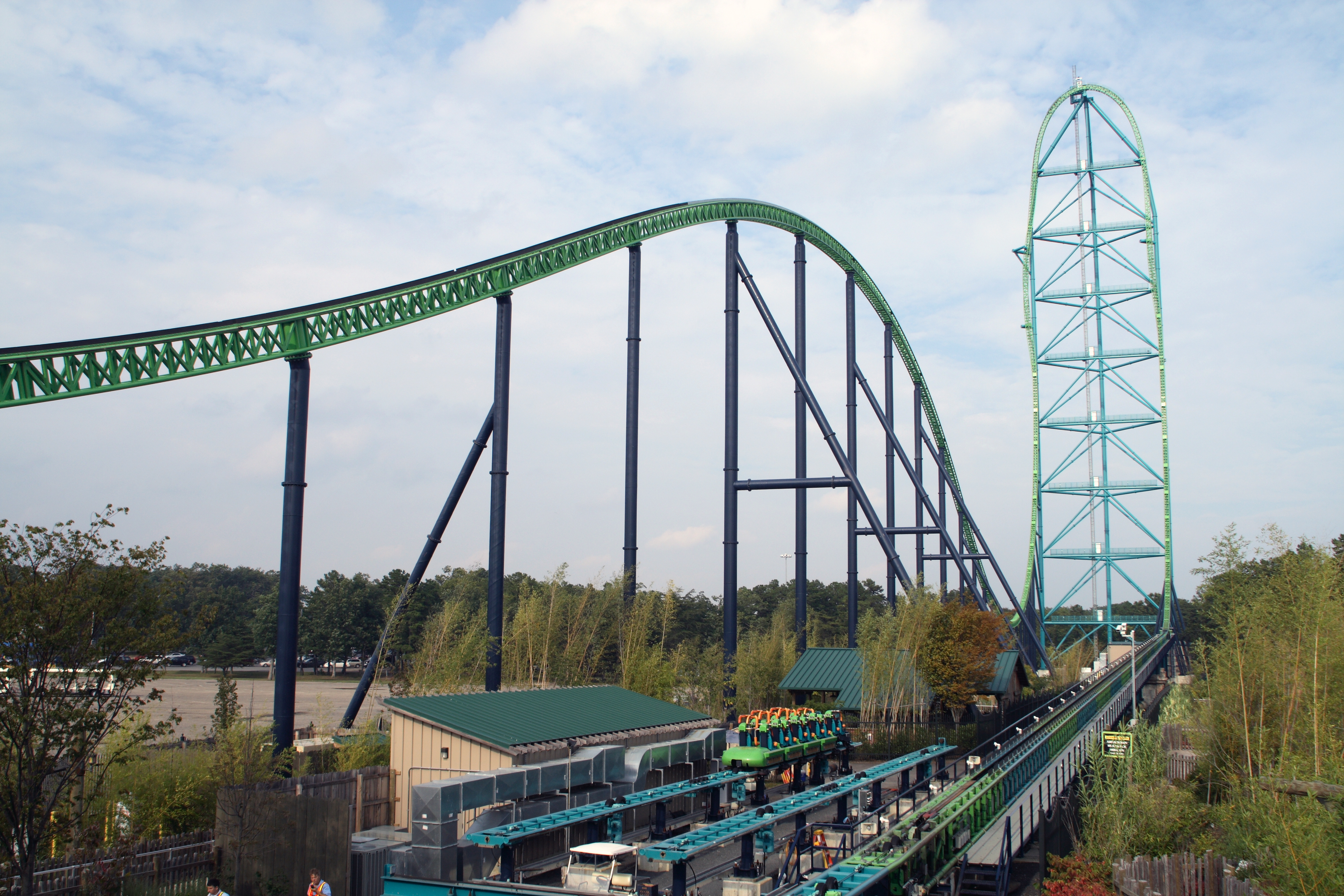
Six Flags Great Adventure's Kingda Ka, with a height of 456 feet (139 m), was the world's tallest roller coaster until its closure in 2024.

On July 1, 1974, under the direction of New York based entrepreneur Warner LeRoy, Six Flags Great Adventure amusement park opened in Jackson Township. It first opened to the public as simply Great Adventure in 1974, it was later acquired by the larger Six Flags brand in 1977. To accommodate for the rise in tourism in the township, in 1997 Simon Property Group opened Jackson Premium Outlets, an open-air outlet power center.

Adventure Crossing opened in January 2023, located between Jackson Premium Outlets and Six Flags Great Adventure. The mixed-use complex features fast-food restaurants, a gas station and a family entertainment complex (with a 100,000 sq ft (9,300 m^{2}) sports bubble that has 42 Top Golf bays, axe throwing, virtual reality rides, and additional restaurants and bars). When completed, the complex will also have a surf pool, turf fields, luxury apartments, Hilton hotels, conference centers, a medical arts facility and other mixed-use amenities for business, lifestyle, healthcare, and leisure.

On April 1, 2023, two separate tornadoes rated EF-2 on the Enhanced Fujita scale struck Jackson Township, with winds of up to 120 miles per hour (190 km/h). The first tornado struck western sections of the township near County Route 537 (Monmouth Road), inflicting significant damage to the Adventure Crossing USA mixed-use complex (causing the 100,000 sq ft (9,300 m^{2}) sports bubble to actually collapse), a newly built warehouse development and several homes. The second tornado struck near the border with neighboring Howell Township near the Aldrich Road area. The National Weather Service confirmed that the path of the tornado was 50 yards (46 m) wide and 1.4 miles (2.3 km) long. Both of these tornadoes were some of the strongest recorded to have hit the state and were part of four separate powerful tornadoes that had impacted the state in the outbreak.

== Geography ==
According to the United States Census Bureau, the township had a total area of 100.55 square miles (260.42 km^{2}), comprised of 99.17 sq mi (256.85 km^{2}) of land (98.63%) and 1.38 sq mi (3.57 km^{2}) of water (1.37%). Jackson is the largest municipality by area in Ocean County.

Vista Center (with a 2020 population of 2,370) is an unincorporated community and census-designated place (CDP) located within Jackson Township. Other unincorporated communities, localities and populated places located completely or partially within the township include Archers Corner, Bennetts Mills, Burksville, Butterfly Bridge, Cassville, Colliers Mills, DeBow Corner, Francis Mills, Grayville, Harmony, Holmansville, Holmeson, Hyson, Jackson Mills, Kapps Corner, Leesville, Legler, Maryland, Midwood, New Prospect, Pleasant Grove, Prospertown, Ridgeway State Forest, Success, The Alligator, Van Hiseville, Webbsville, Whitesbridge and Whitesville.

The township borders Lakewood Township, Manchester Township, Plumsted Township and Toms River in Ocean County; and Freehold Township, Howell Township, Millstone Township and Upper Freehold Township in Monmouth County.

Colliers Mills Wildlife Management Area is a 12,906.63-acre (5,223.13 ha) wildlife management area located within portions of both Jackson Township and Plumsted Township operated by the New Jersey Department of Environmental Protection's Division of Fish and Wildlife. Several man-made lakes are located within the township, including Success Lake in the Colliers Mills Wildlife Management Area.

The township is one of 11 municipalities in Ocean County that are part of the Toms River watershed.

=== Climate ===
The climate of Central Jersey is in the transition zone from the humid subtropical climate (Cfa) of the southeast United States and humid continental (Dfa) to the north. Jackson Township gets 45 inches (1,100 mm) of rain per year. Snowfall is 23 inches (580 mm) inches and the number of days with any measurable precipitation is 115. On average, there are 206 sunny days per year in the township. The July high is around 86 °F (30 °C) and the January low is 23 °F (−5 °C). The comfort index is 45 out of 100.

Climate data for Jackson Township, New Jersey
Month	Jan	Feb	Mar	Apr	May	Jun	Jul	Aug	Sep	Oct	Nov	Dec	Year
Mean daily maximum °F (°C)	41 (5)	44 (7)	51 (11)	61 (16)	71 (22)	80 (27)	85 (29)	83 (28)	77 (25)	67 (19)	57 (14)	46 (8)	64 (18)
Mean daily minimum °F (°C)	22 (−6)	24 (−4)	30 (−1)	39 (4)	49 (9)	59 (15)	64 (18)	62 (17)	55 (13)	43 (6)	35 (2)	27 (−3)	42 (6)
Average precipitation inches (mm)	3.92 (100)	3.30 (84)	4.79 (122)	4.07 (103)	3.73 (95)	3.80 (97)	4.60 (117)	4.69 (119)	3.79 (96)	3.90 (99)	4.11 (104)	4.51 (115)	49.21 (1,251)

== Demographics ==
Historical population
Census	Pop.	Note	%±
1850	1,333	*	—
1860	1,606		20.5%
1870	1,755		9.3%
1880	1,803		2.7%
1890	1,717		−4.8%
1900	1,595		−7.1%
1910	1,325		−16.9%
1920	1,268		−4.3%
1930	1,719		35.6%
1940	2,153		25.2%
1950	3,513		63.2%
1960	5,939		69.1%
1970	18,276		207.7%
1980	25,644		40.3%
1990	33,233		29.6%
2000	42,816		28.8%
2010	54,856		28.1%
2020	58,544		6.7%
2025 (est.)	61,281		4.7%
Population sources:1850–2000 1850–1920 1850–1870; 1850 1870 1880–1890; 1890–1910 1910–1930; 1940–2000 2000; 2010 2020 * = Lost territory in previous decade.

Jackson Township is a suburban community that is sparsely populated, with most residents owning their homes.

=== 2010 census ===
The 2010 United States census counted 54,856 people, 19,417 households, and 15,048 families in the township. The population density was 552.7 per square mile (213.4/km^{2}). There were 20,342 housing units at an average density of 205.0 per square mile (79.2/km^{2}). The racial makeup was 88.90% (48,765) White, 4.86% (2,664) Black or African American, 0.10% (57) Native American, 2.95% (1,616) Asian, 0.03% (18) Pacific Islander, 1.27% (696) from other races, and 1.90% (1,040) from two or more races. Hispanic or Latino people of any race were 7.83% (4,295) of the population.

Of the 19,417 households, 35.2% had children under the age of 18; 63.8% were married couples living together; 9.6% had a female householder with no husband present and 22.5% were non-families. Of all households, 18.2% were made up of individuals and 8.6% had someone living alone who was 65 years of age or older. The average household size was 2.80 and the average family size was 3.21.

24.7% of the population were under the age of 18, 7.4% from 18 to 24, 23.7% from 25 to 44, 29.4% from 45 to 64, and 14.8% who were 65 years of age or older. The median age was 41.6 years. For every 100 females, the population had 94.5 males. For every 100 females ages 18 and older there were 91.4 males.

The Census Bureau's 2006–2010 American Community Survey showed that (in 2010 inflation-adjusted dollars) median household income was $86,327 (with a margin of error of +/− $2,941) and the median family income was $96,171 (+/− $2,734). Males had a median income of $68,985 (+/− $4,126) versus $45,714 (+/− $2,238) for females. The per capita income for the township was $34,521 (+/− $912). About 2.8% of families and 3.8% of the population were below the poverty line, including 4.4% of those under age 18 and 3.5% of those age 65 or over.

=== 2000 census ===
As of the 2000 United States census there were 42,816 people, 14,176 households, and 11,269 families residing in the township. The population density was 427.9 inhabitants per square mile (165.2/km^{2}). There were 14,640 housing units at an average density of 146.3 per square mile (56.5/km^{2}). The racial makeup of the township was 91.26% White, 3.90% African American, 0.13% Native American, 2.06% Asian, 0.01% Pacific Islander, 0.97% from other races, and 1.67% from two or more races. Hispanic or Latino people of any race were 5.78% of the population.

There were 14,176 households, out of which 44.0% had children under the age of 18 living with them, 66.7% were married couples living together, 8.9% had a female householder with no husband present, and 20.5% were non-families. 16.0% of all households were made up of individuals, and 6.1% had someone living alone who was 65 years of age or older. The average household size was 2.99 and the average family size was 3.38.

In the township the population was spread out, with 29.7% under the age of 18, 6.5% from 18 to 24, 34.2% from 25 to 44, 20.3% from 45 to 64, and 9.4% who were 65 years of age or older. The median age was 35 years. For every 100 females, there were 95.5 males. For every 100 females age 18 and over, there were 92.1 males.

The median income for a household in the township was $65,218, and the median income for a family was $71,045. Males had a median income of $51,276 versus $33,882 for females. The per capita income for the township was $23,981. About 2.5% of families and 3.7% of the population were below the poverty line, including 3.2% of those under age 18 and 6.3% of those age 65 or over.

=== Orthodox Jewish community ===
Since 2016, the Orthodox Jewish population has been growing in central and eastern Jackson Township, along the border with Lakewood Township, due to the more affordable housing and quieter lifestyle that Jackson Township offers over Lakewood. By 2020, the Orthodox Jewish community had grown to approximately 500 families, out of 19,400 total households, from a limited presence just a few years prior.

A series of pending lawsuits allege that Jackson Township has passed multiple ordinances trying to stymie movement from Lakewood to Jackson. A "no knock" ordinance had been passed by Jackson prohibiting door-to-door solicitation after residents complained of an increase in real estate solicitations. Ordinances were passed that were restrictive to the Orthodox Jewish lifestyle; efforts to open yeshivas in the township, often accompanied by dormitories, were blocked by newly adopted ordinances that restricted new schools and prohibited dormitories. Eruvs (symbolic religious enclosures) were determined not to meet building and construction codes after a new ordinance was passed that tightened restrictions on items placed in the public "right-of-way". To address this last concern, the township entered into a preliminary settlement allowing eruvs in some parts of township and proposed a township-wide solution that was ultimately deemed impractical.

In addition, the United States Department of Justice and the New Jersey Attorney General have opened investigations into whether the township practiced anti-Semitic discrimination, filing multiple subpoenas against township officials. These investigations culminated in May 2020 with a federal lawsuit brought by the Department of Justice against the township, alleging violations of the Religious Land Use and Institutionalized Persons Act and the Fair Housing Act related to the township's new land use laws.

== Economy ==
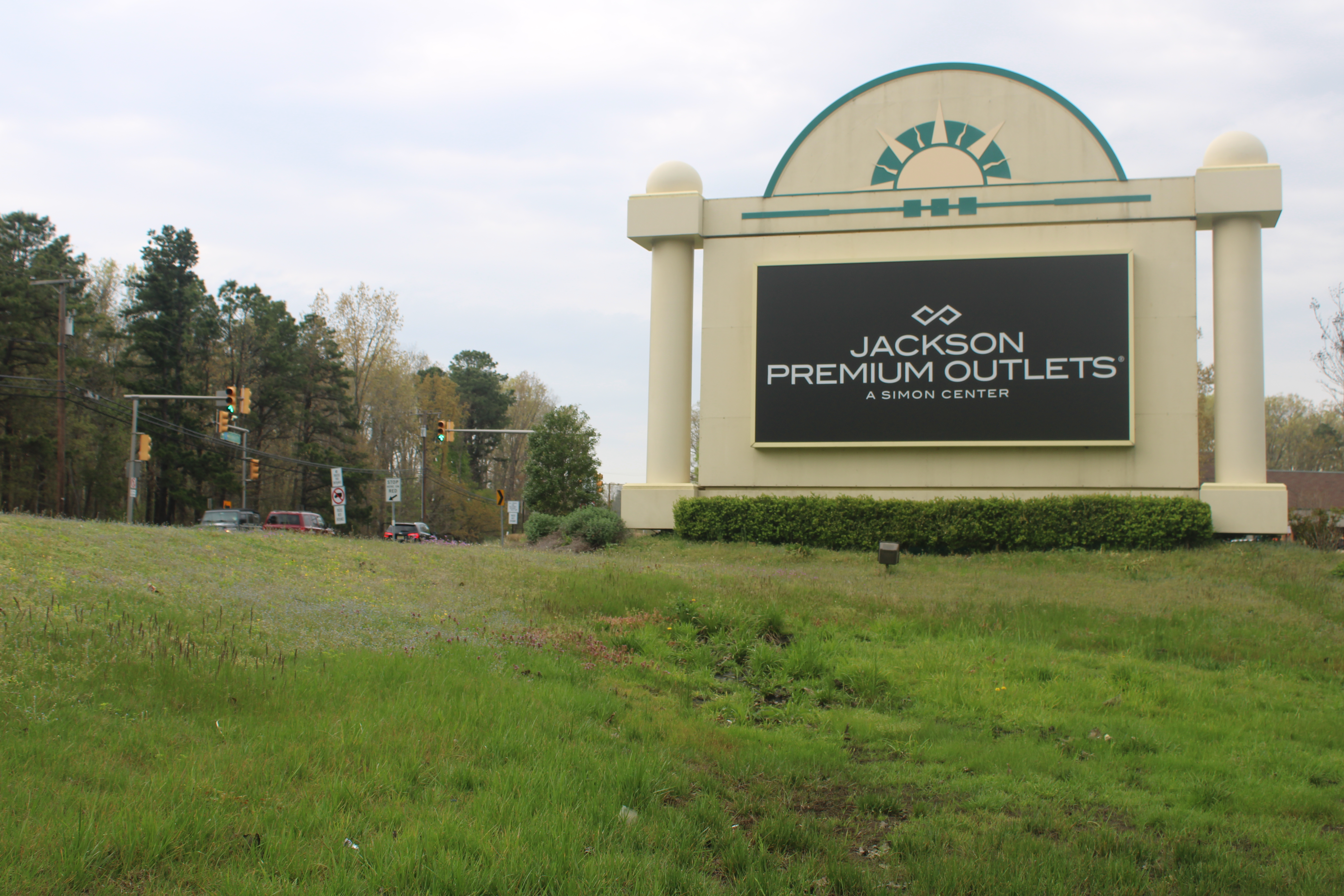
Jackson Premium Outlets

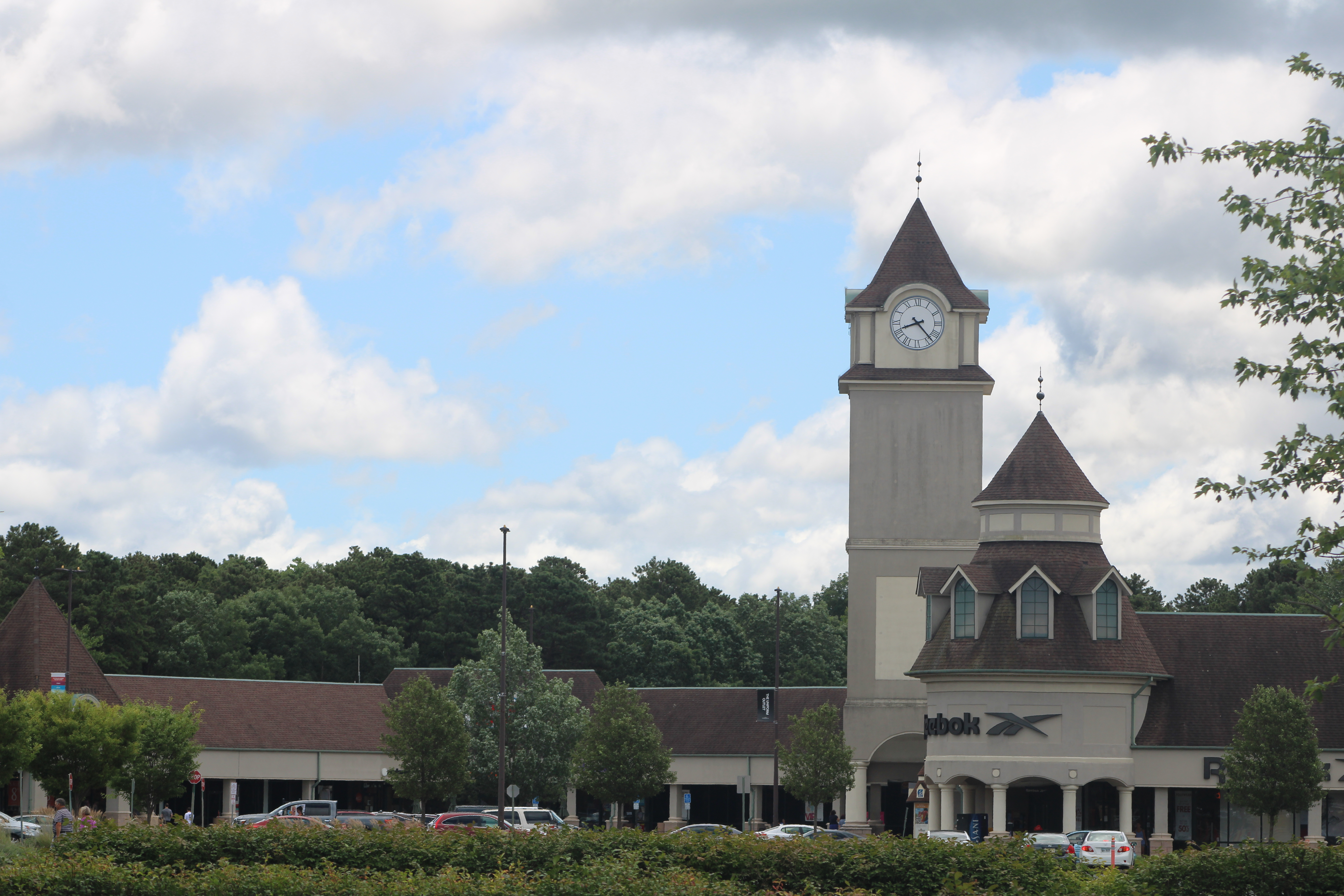

Jackson Premium Outlets is an open-air outlet power center owned by the Simon Property Group. It is located off of Interstate 195, County Route 537 and County Route 526/571. The facility opened in 1997 and was expanded in 1998. The outlets are located roughly 2.5 miles (4.0 km) away from the Six Flags Great Adventure amusement park. The retail outlet center offers over 70 stores and has a gross leasable area of 285,719 square feet (26,544.2 m^{2}).

== Media ==
The Asbury Park Press provides daily news coverage of the Township, as does WOBM-FM radio. The Township provides material and commentary to The Jackson Times, which is one of seven weekly papers from Micromedia Publications. In addition, JTOWN Magazine provides news, sports and other local information.

== Sports ==
In 2015, the Jackson Little League 12-year-old All-Stars won the state championship, and went on to the Mid-Atlantic Regional final where they lost to Red Land Little League from Pennsylvania who eventually won the U.S. Championship, before falling to the team from Japan in the 2015 Little League World Series.

In 2017, the Holbrook Little League All-Stars defeated Maryland 8–3, sending Holbrook to the 2017 Little League World Series.

== Government ==
=== Local government ===
Jackson Township adopted the mayor-council form of government under the Faulkner Act as of July 1, 2006. The township is one of 71 (of the 564) municipalities statewide governed under this form. The governing body is comprised of the Mayor and the five-member Township Council, who are elected at-large on a non-partisan basis. Council members serve four-year terms on a staggered basis, with either two or three seats coming up for election in even-numbered years as part of the November general election. The Mayor is elected directly by the voters to a four-year term of office that comes up for election during the same year that two council seats are up for a vote. The Council selects a President and a Vice President from among its members. Until 2006, Jackson Township was governed under the township form of government with a five-member Township Committee, whose members were elected directly by the voters in partisan elections to serve three-year terms of office on a staggered basis, with one or two seats coming up for election each year. In June 2011, the Township Council passed an ordinance shifting nonpartisan elections from May to November.

As of 2026, the Mayor of Jackson Township is Jennifer L. Kuhn, who was appointed to serve a term of office ending December 31, 2026. Township council members are Council President Mordechai Burnstein (2028), Council Vice President Giuseppe A. Palmeri (2028), Nino A. Borrelli (2028), Kenneth J. Bressi (2026) and Christopher Pollak (elected to an unexpired term expiring 2026).

In October 2025, Jennifer Kuhn was appointed to serve as mayor following the resignation of Michael Reina, who resigned after serving as mayor for 17 years. Christopher Pollak was elected in November 2025 to serve the one year remaining on the council vacancy.

Mordechai Burnstein, president of the Jackson Republican Club and planning board member, was appointed to the township council in November 2023, replacing former councilman Martin Flemming III, who had resigned the previous month.

In May 2020, Council President Barry Calogero resigned from office from his term expiring in December 2020.

In January 2020, the Township Council appointed Martin Flemming III to fill the seat expiring in December 2020 that had become vacant following the resignation of Robert Nixon. Flemming resigned from the council in October 2023.

=== Federal, state and county representation ===
Jackson Township is located in the 4th Congressional District and is part of New Jersey's 12th state legislative district.

For the 119th United States Congress, New Jersey's 4th congressional district is represented by Chris Smith (R, Manchester Township). New Jersey is represented in the United States Senate by Democrats Cory Booker (Newark, term ends 2027) and Andy Kim (Moorestown, term ends 2031).

For the 2026–2027 session, the 12th legislative district of the New Jersey Legislature is represented in the State Senate by Owen Henry (R, Old Bridge Township) and in the General Assembly by Robert D. Clifton (R, Matawan) and Alex Sauickie (R, Jackson Township).

Ocean County is governed by a Board of County Commissioners composed of five members who are elected on an at-large basis in partisan elections and serving staggered three-year terms of office, with either one or two seats coming up for election each year as part of the November general election. At an annual reorganization held in the beginning of January, the board chooses a director and a deputy director from among its members. As of 2025, Ocean County's Commissioners (with party affiliation, term-end year and residence) are:

John P. Kelly (R, 2025, Eagleswood Township), Virginia E. Haines (R, 2025, Toms River), Robert Arace (R, Manchester Township, 2027) Jennifer Bacchione (R, Berkeley Township, 2027) and Frank Sadeghi (R, 2026, Toms River).

Constitutional officers elected on a countywide basis are: Clerk Scott M. Colabella (R, 2025, Barnegat Light), Sheriff Michael G. Mastronardy (R, 2025; Toms River) and Surrogate Jeffrey Moran (R, 2028, Beachwood).

=== Politics ===
As of November 2023, there were a total of 41,483 registered voters in Jackson Township. Among the township's 2010 Census population, 62.0% (vs. 63.2% in Ocean County) were registered to vote, including 82.3% of those ages 18 and over (vs. 82.6% countywide).

Gubernatorial election results for Jackson Township
Year	Republican		Democratic		Third party(ies)	
Year	No.	%	No.	%	No.	%
2025	16,517	67.98%	7,669	31.56%	112	0.46%
2021	13,345	66.77%	6,515	32.60%	126	0.63%
2017	9,232	62.05%	5,359	36.02%	288	1.94%
2013	11,171	73.87%	3,693	24.42%	259	1.71%
2009	11,564	67.57%	4,620	26.99%	931	5.44%
2005	7,915	56.54%	5,406	38.61%	679	4.85%

In the 2016 presidential election, Republican Donald Trump received 62.5% of the vote (16,910 cast), ahead of Democrat Hillary Clinton with 34.3% (9,275 votes), and other candidates with 3.2% (856 votes), among the 27,041 cast by the township's voters. In the 2012 presidential election, Republican Mitt Romney received 55.5% of the vote (13,752 cast), ahead of Democrat Barack Obama with 43.3% (10,728 votes), and other candidates with 1.1% (279 votes), among the 24,925 ballots cast by the township's 36,446 registered voters (166 ballots were spoiled), for a turnout of 68.4%. In the 2008 presidential election, Republican John McCain received 55.2% of the vote (14,069 cast), ahead of Democrat Barack Obama with 43.0% (10,951 votes) and other candidates with 1.2% (296 votes), among the 25,480 ballots cast by the township's 34,749 registered voters, for a turnout of 73.3%.

Presidential election results
Year	Republican	Democratic	Third parties
2024	67.4% 20,032	31.1% 9,257	1.5% 370
2020	61.4% 19,880	37.0% 11,878	1.6% 493
2016	62.5% 16,910	34.3% 9,189	3.2% 856
2012	55.5% 13,752	43.3% 10,728	1.1% 279
2008	55.2% 14,069	43.0% 10,951	1.2% 296
2004	59.2% 12,541	39.9% 8,458	0.9% 185

In the 2021 gubernatorial election, of the 19,986 ballots cast by Township voters, Republican Jack Ciattarelli received 66.8% of the vote (13,345 votes), ahead of incumbent Democrat Phil Murphy with 32.6% (6,515 votes), and other candidates with 0.6% (126 votes). In the 2017 gubernatorial election, Republican Kim Guadagno received 62.0% of the vote (9,232 cast), ahead of Democrat Phil Murphy with 36.0% (5,359 votes), and other candidates with 1.9% (288 votes), among the 14,879 cast by the township's voters. In the 2013 gubernatorial election, Republican Chris Christie received 73.9% of the vote (11,171 cast), ahead of Democrat Barbara Buono with 24.4% (3,693 votes), and other candidates with 1.7% (259 votes), among the 15,356 ballots cast by the township's 36,215 registered voters (233 ballots were spoiled), for a turnout of 42.4%.

United States Senate election results for Jackson Township1
Year	Republican		Democratic		Third party(ies)	
Year	No.	%	No.	%	No.	%
2024	17,514	65.08%	9,088	33.77%	308	1.14%
2018	13,359	62.84%	7,288	34.28%	611	2.87%
2012	13,034	55.66%	9,873	42.16%	512	2.19%
2006	6,989	56.25%	5,008	40.31%	427	3.44%

United States Senate election results for Jackson Township2
Year	Republican		Democratic		Third party(ies)	
Year	No.	%	No.	%	No.	%
2020	19,175	61.40%	11,508	36.85%	545	1.75%
2014	7,267	57.88%	5,013	39.93%	276	2.20%
2013	5,981	60.93%	3,741	38.11%	94	0.96%
2008	13,269	56.99%	9,489	40.75%	527	2.26%

== Education ==
The Jackson School District serves students in Preschool through 12th grade. The district operates five elementary schools serving grades K–4, One upper elementary school serving grades 5, and 6, one middle school serving grades 7, and 8, and one high school serving grades 9-12.

In January 2015, the Jackson Board of Education voted to implement full-day kindergarten, which was introduced in September 2015.

As of the 2021–22 school year, the district, comprised of 10 schools, had an enrollment of 7,535 students and 623.1 classroom teachers (on an FTE basis), for a student–teacher ratio of 12.1:1. Schools in the district (with 2021–22 enrollment data from the National Center for Education Statistics) are: Crawford-Rodriguez Elementary School (536 students; in grades PreK-5), Elms Elementary School (627; PreK-5), Lucy N. Holman Elementary School (484; PreK-5), Howard C. Johnson Elementary School (354; PreK-5), Sylvia Rosenauer Elementary School (213; PreK-5), Switlik Elementary School (806; K-5), Carl W. Goetz Middle School (1,001; 6-8), Christa McAuliffe Middle School (759; 6-8), Jackson Liberty High School (1,129; 9-12) and Jackson Memorial High School (1,568; 9-12) This, however, has changed because in February 2025, The Jackson School district announced that it would close Christa McAuliffe Middle School at the end of the 2024-25 school year. It also announced that for the 2025–26 school year, all high school students would be attending Jackson Liberty High School, which has become Jackson Township High School, while Jackson Memorial High School would be repurposed into Jackson Township Middle School for grades 7 and 8. The past Carl W. Goetz Middle School would be repurposed to the Jackson Township 5-6 School serving grades 5 and 6.

Mother Seton Academy, a Catholic School for grades Pre-K–8, which operates under the auspices of the Roman Catholic Diocese of Trenton, is in nearby Howell Township. It was formed in 2019 by the merger of St. Aloysius and St. Veronica schools; the former was in Jackson and the latter was in Howell.

== Historic district ==
The Cassville Crossroads Historic District is a 0.5-acre (0.20 ha) historic district located in the community of Cassville, at the junction of County Route 571 and County Route 528, in Jackson. The district was added to the National Register of Historic Places on August 26, 1982 for its significance in agriculture, architecture, art, commerce, and religion. It includes nine contributing buildings and one contributing structure.

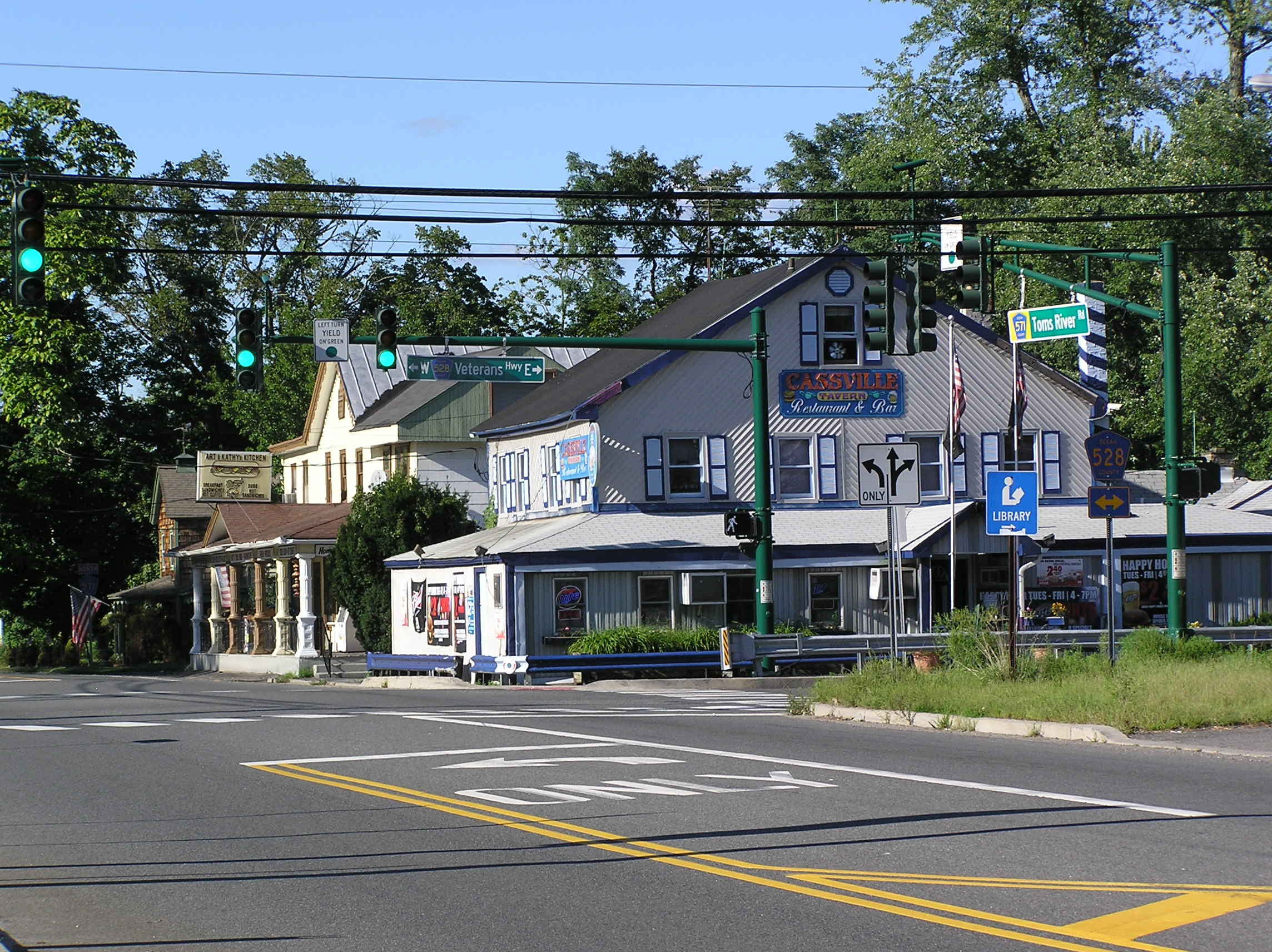
Cassville Tavern

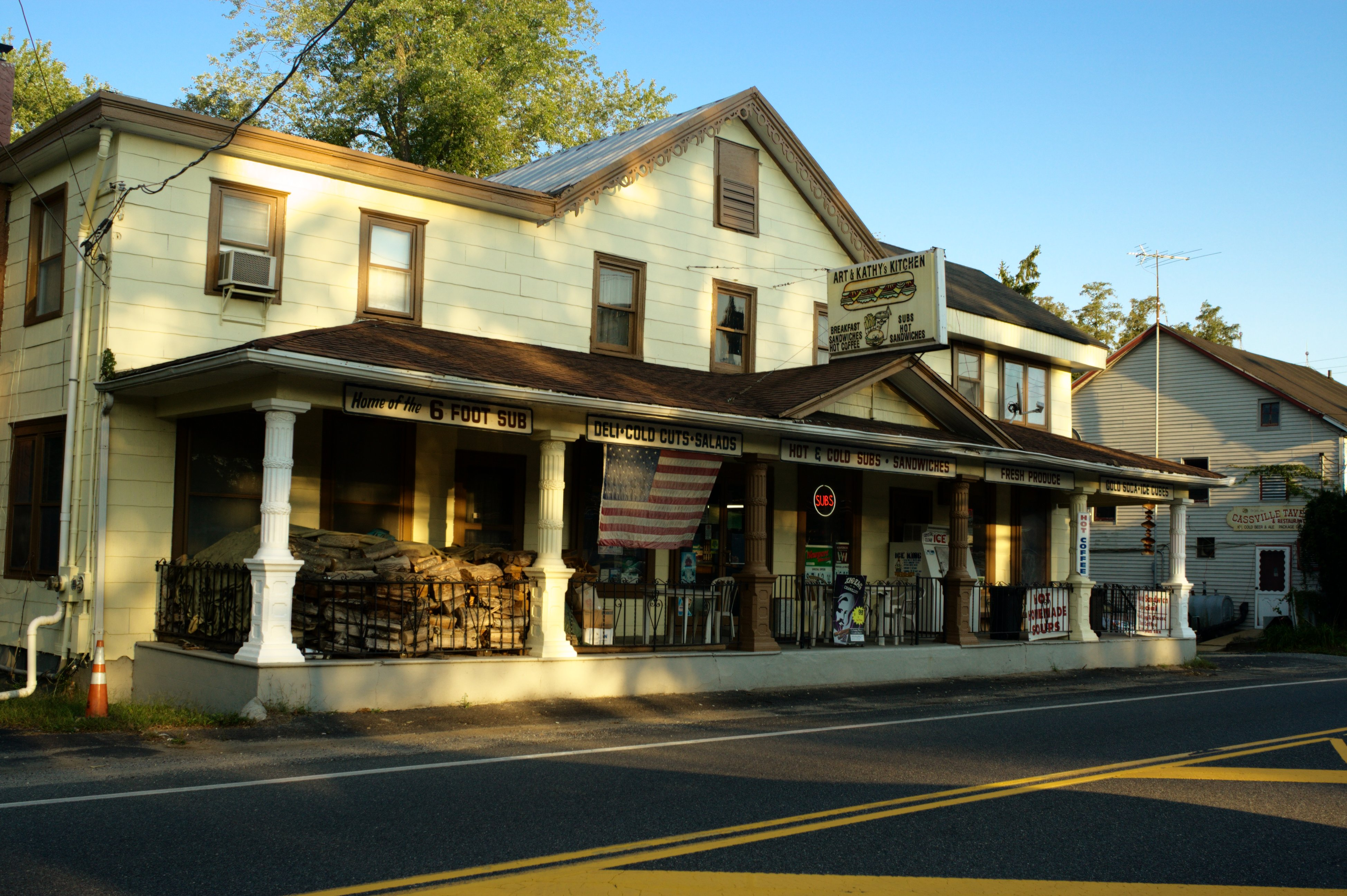
Art & Kathys Kitchen

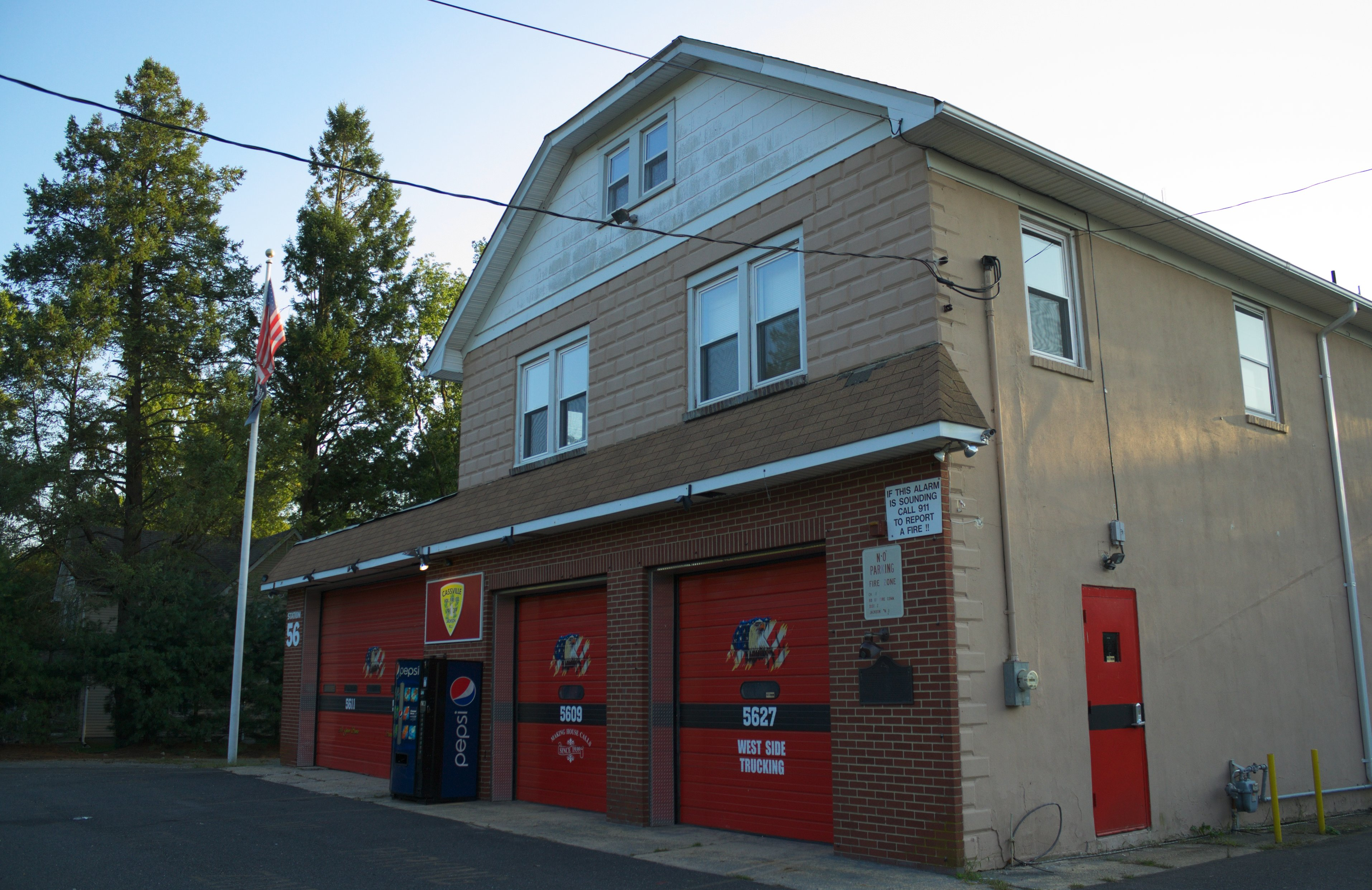
Cassville Fire Station

== Infrastructure ==
=== Public safety departments ===
Police Department

Jackson Township has its own police department which was established in 1946 and which operates out of the Municipal Justice Complex. The Chief of Police is Mary Nelson.

Fire Department

Jackson Township has three fire districtst:

- Station 54 – Jackson Mills Fire Co./Jackson Fire District No. 4 (combination volunteer / career) - Chief Stanley O'Brien Sr.
- Station 55 – Jackson Township Fire Co. No. 1/Jackson Twp Fire District No. 3 (combination volunteer / career) - Deputy Chief Edward Moore
- Station 56 – Cassville Fire Co./Jackson Fire District No. 2 (combination volunteer/career) - Chief Brian McCarthy
- Station 57 – Jackson Fire District No. 2 (Career) The former Whitesville Fire Co absolved effective 1/1/2026

Fire Bureau

Jackson Township has three fire bureaus that enforce the NJ Uniform Fire Safety Act:

- Jackson Bureau of Fire Prevention District 2 - Fire Official Scott Rauch
- Jackson Bureau of Fire Safety Fire District 3 - Fire Official Mike Grossman
- Jackson Bureau of Fire Prevention District 4 - Fire Official Stanley O'Brien Jr.

Emergency Medical Services

Currently, emergency medical services are provided by the township's first aid squad.

- Squad 22 – Jackson Township EMS (combination career/volunteer) - Chief Al Couceiro
- Squad 80 – Six Flags Great Adventure First Aid (career)

Advanced life support EMS (i.e., paramedics or "Mobile Intensive Care Units"), is provided by hospital providers under a statewide system mandated by the New Jersey Department of Health and Senior Services. Jackson Township was previously served primarily by MONOC paramedic units. On April 1, 2020, MONOC was out of business and RWJ Mobile Healthcare assumed responsibility for providing ALS service to Jackson Township.

=== Transportation ===
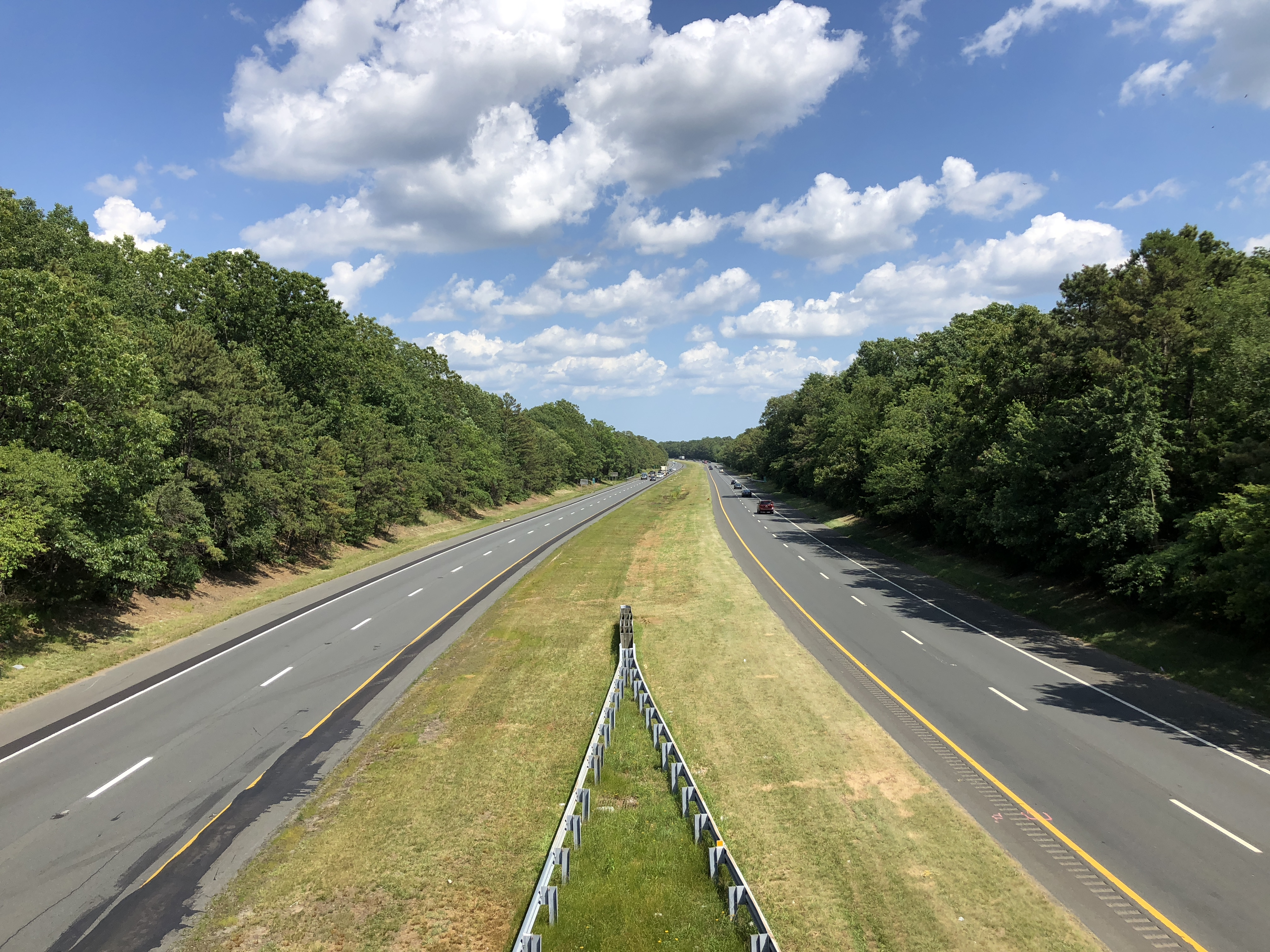
Eastbound Interstate 195 in Jackson Township

==== Roads and highways ====
As of May 2010, the township had a total of 312.39 miles (502.74 km) of roadways, of which 201.70 miles (324.60 km) were maintained by the municipality, 101.77 miles (163.78 km) by Ocean County and 8.92 miles (14.36 km) by the New Jersey Department of Transportation.

Interstate 195 is a major artery that travels through the northern section of Jackson (Jackson is the only municipality in Ocean County that hosts any interstate). While the expressway travels into Howell Township and Millstone Township, it is also a vital link for Six Flags since it provides direct connections to the Garden State Parkway, New Jersey Turnpike (Interstate 95) and Interstate 295.

County Route 526, County Route 527, County Route 528, County Route 537, County Route 547, and County Route 571 pass through the township. County Route 539 also passes through the township, but in the southwest corner, for less than half a mile.

==== Public transportation ====
The Monmouth Ocean Middlesex Line is a proposed NJ Transit project which would connect Monmouth, Ocean and Middlesex counties to the rest of the system's rail network. Jackson Township would be a potential stop for the "MOM" Line.

As of 2021, NJ Transit provides Jackson bus service on the 317 line between Philadelphia and the Jersey Shore, and seasonal express service on the 308 line between Six Flags Great Adventure and Midtown Manhattan's Port Authority Bus Terminal. Nearby Howell Township connects to Port Authority with frequent service on the 139 line and its 130, 132, 136 variants, and connects to Newark Liberty International Airport on the 67 line. Nearby Lakewood Township also connects to Toms River and Atlantic City on the 559 line.

Academy Bus offers service to the Port Authority Bus Terminal in Midtown Manhattan and to the Wall Street in Lower Manhattan, with multiple stops in Jackson Township and surrounding municipalities.

Weekly trips to local shopping centers can be reserved on the "Jackson Flex Route" of the Ocean Ride Shoppers Loop.

=== Healthcare ===
Jackson Township is served by CentraState Healthcare System. Located in neighboring Freehold Township, the 287-bed hospital is a partner of Atlantic Health System and is affiliated with Rutgers Robert Wood Johnson Medical School. CentraState Healthcare system provides additional healthcare services through its various family practices in communities across Central Jersey. One of those family practices has an office located in Jackson Township.

The next closest hospitals to the township are the Hamilton Division of Robert Wood Johnson University Hospital in nearby Hamilton Township, Monmouth Medical Center's Southern Campus in nearby Lakewood Township and Jersey Shore University Medical Center in nearby Neptune Township.

== Notable people ==
People who were born in, residents of, or otherwise closely associated with Jackson Township include: ((B) denotes that the person was born there.)

- Cassidy Benintente (born 1994), defender and midfielder for Sky Blue FC of the National Women's Soccer League
- Parker Bohn III (born 1963), professional bowler
- Elijah Boothe, actor best known for his role in Luke Cage
- Deena Nicole Cortese (born 1987), reality television personality who appeared on the MTV reality show Jersey Shore from 2010 to 2012
- Melvin Cottrell (1929–2002), former mayor of Jackson Township who served in the New Jersey General Assembly from 1992 until his death
- Scotty Cranmer (born 1987), BMX rider
- Joey DeZart (born 1998), professional soccer player who plays as a midfielder for Orlando City in Major League Soccer
- Rich Gaspari (born 1963), former professional bodybuilder and CEO of Gaspari Nutrition
- Erin Gleason (born 1977), short track speed skater who competed in three events at the 1998 Winter Olympics
- Frank B. Holman (1930–2005), former mayor of Jackson Township and New Jersey Republican State chairman
- Rob Johnson (born 1973), former professional soccer player who played for the MetroStars
- Vini Lopez (born 1949), drummer who played with the E Street Band
- Gina Lynn (born 1974), pornographic actress
- E. J. Nduka (born 1988), professional wrestler who competed for WWE
- Steve Niles (born 1965), writer of 30 Days of Night (B)
- Stephen Panasuk (born 1989), quarterback for the Cleveland Gladiators of the Arena Football League
- Johnny Petraglia (born 1947), professional bowler
- Anthony Ranaudo (born 1989), pitcher who has played for the Boston Red Sox
- Alex Sauickie (born 1971), politician who has represented the 12th legislative district in the New Jersey General Assembly since 2022
- Tyler Smarslok (born 1992), professional baseball coach for the Washington Nationals
- Anthony Stolarz (born 1994), goaltender for the Toronto Maple Leafs of the National Hockey League and 2024 Stanley Cup Champion
- Stanley Switlik (1890–1981), parachuting pioneer who donated the land that is the site of Switlik Elementary School
- Tom Tarver, quarterback who played for the Rutgers University Scarlet Knights
- Matt Thaiss (born 1995), first round pick in the 2016 MLB Draft by the Los Angeles Angels
- Zakk Wylde (born 1967 as Jeffrey Phillip Wiedlandt), guitarist for Ozzy Osbourne and Black Label Society
