= Zschiegner Refining Company =

- Superfund site
- Location within Monmouth County, New Jersey Location within New Jersey
- Location: Howell, Monmouth, New Jersey; 40.145125°N 74.199117°W

Information
- CERCLIS ID: NJD986643153
- Contaminants: Ether, sodium peroxide, sodium hydroxide, chromic acid
- Responsible parties: Zschiegner Refining Company

Progress
- Proposed: September 25, 1997
- Listed: March 6, 1998
- Construction completed: August 22, 2016

The Zschiegner Refining Company Superfund Site is located on the former property of the Zschiegner Refining Company (ZRC) facility in Howell Township, New Jersey.

In 1992, the facility was raided by the United States Drug Enforcement Administration on suspicions of illegal drugs manufacturing, after which the United States Environmental Protection Agency determined that around 3,000 improperly stored chemicals at the site had contaminated the surrounding soil, surface water, and groundwater; the company and facility were shut down the same year.

After a Hazard Ranking System report was conducted by the EPA, the site was placed on the National Priorities List in March 1998. In 2008, cleanup operations were completed, but groundwater and wetland monitoring is ongoing as of 2026.

== Background ==
=== Township history ===
Howell Township is located in Monmouth County, New Jersey, United States. On February 23, 1801, Howell was included as a township by an act of the New Jersey Legislature, from parts of Shrewsbury Township, before itself being partitioned to create more townships and a borough. Howell borders townships in 2 counties; Wall, Freehold, and Colts Neck in Monmouth County, & Brick, Lakewood, and Jackson in Ocean County. Howell completely surrounds Farmingdale Borough, making Howell a “doughnut town”.

Howell Township was already the location of another superfund site almost a decade prior; the 12-acre Bog Creek Farm Superfund Site was declared in 1983 when it was revealed that chemicals related to the production of paint, which contained VOCs and heavy metals, had been illegally dumped by the Western Ranch Corporation throughout the 1970s.

In the 1990 US Census, the most recent census prior to the discovery of the site, the township had a population of around 39,000 people.

=== Company and site history ===
The Zschiegner Refining Company (ZRC) was founded in 1964 by Herbert Zschiegner. The ZRC site was a precious metals recovery facility, located on 1442 Maxim Southard Road, a 6.1 acres (2.5 ha) lot in a rural residential area owned by both Zschiegner and his wife. The site was principally used as a chemical storage and metal recovery facility, where operations mainly involved the use of chemicals to strip precious metals from junked materials such as watch bands, film, and electrical components.

The eastern side of the ZRC site contained a north-south section of Haystack Brook, as well as parts of its surrounding wetlands; Haystack Brook flows into Muddy Ford Brook, a tributary of the Metedeconk River, which is a major source of municipal water for approximately 86,000 residents in Monmouth and Ocean County through the Brick Township Municipal Utilities Authority. A small unnamed pond sat adjacent to the southeast edge of the site.

The ZRC site was facing towards the Candlewood residential development opposite of Maxim Southard Road, and was neighbored by other private homes; the homes were significantly closer to the site, with one being 100 ft (30 m) and two others located 100 yards (91 m) away from the main building. The ZRC site and its neighbors received their water from private wells, while the Candlewood development received their municipal water from the Manasquan Reservoir and local aquifers managed by Howell Township.

== Site discovery, cleanup, and Superfund designation ==
=== Initial DEA drug raid and discovery ===
On October 31, 1992, the United States Drug Enforcement Administration (DEA) conducted a drug raid at the ZRC facility, on the suspicions that the site was being used for the manufacturing of illegal drugs. After the raid, DEA officials found that the company was manufacturing methamphetamines, and had approximately 3,000 different chemicals which included peroxides, cyanides, caustics, and acids that had all been improperly stored.

Zschiegner was arrested and charged with conspiracy to manufacture and distribute methamphetamines, later being charged with 3 counts of violating the Clean Water Act after the EPA got involved with the ZRC site; he was criminally convicted on these counts in 1995, and was ordered to serve a 16-month prison term, as well as to pay $650,000 USD in restitution to the EPA.

=== EPA involvement and cleanup operations ===
3 days after the DEA raided the ZRC site, on November 2, 1992, the United States Environmental Protection Agency (EPA) sent On-Site Coordinations (OSCs) from their Region II Response & Prevention Branch to begin site evaluations and initial material collection, beginning “Phase I” of cleanup operations. The OSCs found the site to be in a dilapidated state, with the primary building on the site having a heavily eroded concrete loading dock they believed was due to acid spills, and significant amounts of litter strewn around the entire site.

As part of Phase I, plans for the safe removal of material were created in coordination with officials from Howell and Lakewood townships, Monmouth County, the New Jersey Department of Environmental Protection, and federal EPA officials, as well as members of the Canadian Coast Guard. Beginning on the week of November 23, the EPA placed the chemicals in new containers and began “remov[ing] approximately 2,000 gallons of acidic solutions, 1,600 gallons of basic solutions, and 1,400 small containers of hazardous substances” from the site for future sampling, disposal, and detonation if they were considered reactive.

By March 1993, Phase II of the cleanup operations began, which involved the final disposal of all removed materials from the site. Inorganic contaminants were still present in soil, surface water and sediment samples taken in 1995. Samples taken in July of 1998 showed no contaminants present in private well water downstream from the site.

In the EPA’s September 2004 Record of Decision, the agency called for “excavation of contaminated surface and subsurface soil; excavation of contaminated sediment from the wetland and a small portion of the brook next to the site; transportation of contaminated soil and sediment off site for disposal, with treatment if necessary; demolition of the on-site building to allow for excavation of contaminated soil beneath it; and groundwater monitoring”.

The primary building on site was demolished in February 2007, and “a total of 10,425 cubic yards (7,970 m^{3}) of contaminated upland soil and 15,351 cubic yards (11,737 m^{3}) of contaminated wetland soil was excavated and disposed of” between February 2007 and October 2008.

=== Superfund designation ===
After the EPA decided to investigate the site further, the agency took several samples of the soil, groundwater, and now-abandoned buildings, with a sample analysis in 1995 showing that inorganic contaminants were found in the on-site soil, as well as the sediment near, and water downstream of, Haystack Brook. In December 1997, a Hazard Ranking System (HRS) report was made, which concluded by placing the site on the National Priorities List (NPL) in March 1998.

== Health and environmental hazards ==
During their investigation into the site contamination, the EPA discovered significant amounts of several hazardous chemicals in sample of the topsoil, sediments, surface water, groundwater, and the primary building itself. Among the most prevalent chemicals detected where as follows;

=== Ether ===
Ether, a colorless liquid that can easily evaporate, was among the first chemicals to be detected at the site. Chemical exposure by inhaling or absorption through the skin can cause narcotic effects such as sleepiness or giddiness, eye irritation, irritation of skin, or respiratory system.

=== Sodium peroxide ===
Sodium peroxide, an odorless yellow-white powder, was detected at the site. When exposed, some symptoms include irritation, as well as chemical burns on the eyes, skin, and mucous membranes.

=== Sodium hydroxide ===
Sodium hydroxide was found in site samples. An odorless white powder, this chemical could scar the eyes, nose or throat and could cause irritation, being very destructive to tissue.

=== Chromic acid ===
Chromic acid was also another chemical found on the site. A dark red liquid, exposure could cause eye and nose irritation, as well as to the respiratory system damage, dermatitis, and eczema.

== Current status ==
The cleanup for the ZRC site has been completed since 2008, with the final removal of contaminated soil in October of that year. The EPA continues to provide long-term monitoring of the groundwater and wetland in order to prove the effectiveness of its cleanup operations.
