= Ramtown, New Jersey =

Populated place in Monmouth County, New Jersey, US

- Census-designated place
- Location of Ramtown in Monmouth County highlighted in red (left). Inset map: Location of Monmouth County in New Jersey highlighted in orange (right).

- Location in Monmouth County Location in New Jersey Location in the United States
- Coordinates: 40.114713°N 74.150158°W
- Country: United States
- State: New Jersey
- County: Monmouth
- Township: Howell

Area
  - Total: 2.17 sq mi (5.63 km^{2})
  - Land: 2.16 sq mi (5.60 km^{2})
  - Water: 0.012 sq mi (0.03 km^{2}) 0.50%
- Elevation: 59 ft (18 m)

Population (2020)
  - Total: 6,329
  - Density: 2,924.7/sq mi (1,129.2/km^{2})
- Time zone: UTC−05:00 (Eastern (EST))
  - Summer (DST): UTC−04:00 (Eastern (EDT))
- ZIP Code: 07731 (Howell)
- Area codes: 732/848
- FIPS code: 34-61725
- GNIS feature ID: 02389724

Ramtown is a census-designated place and unincorporated community in Howell Township, in Monmouth County, New Jersey, United States. As of the 2020 United States census, the CDP population was 6,329.

== Geography ==
Ramtown is in southern Monmouth County, in the southeast corner of Howell Township. It is bordered to the east by Wall Township and to the southeast by Brick Township in Ocean County. The North Branch of the Metedeconk River forms part of the southwest border of the township, separating the community from Lakewood Township in Ocean County. The Atlantic Ocean at Manasquan is 6 miles (10 km) to the east, and Freehold, the Monmouth county seat, is 14 miles (23 km) to the northwest.

According to the U.S. Census Bureau, the Ramtown CDP has an area of 2.175 square miles (5.633 km^{2}), including 2.164 square miles (5.605 km^{2}) of land and 0.011 square miles (0.028 km^{2}) of water (0.51%).

== Demographics ==
Historical population
Census	Pop.	Note	%±
2000	5,932		—
2010	6,242		5.2%
2020	6,329		1.4%
Population sources: 1950 1960 1970; 1980 1990 2000; 2010 2020

Ramtown first appeared as a census designated place in the 2000 U.S. census.

=== Racial and ethnic composition ===
Ramtown CDP, New Jersey – Racial and ethnic composition Note: the US Census treats Hispanic/Latino as an ethnic category. This table excludes Latinos from the racial categories and assigns them to a separate category. Hispanics/Latinos may be of any race.
Race / Ethnicity (NH = Non-Hispanic)	Pop 2000	Pop 2010	Pop 2020	% 2000	% 2010	% 2020
White alone (NH)	5,268	5,353	5,106	88.81%	85.76%	80.68%
Black or African American alone (NH)	116	171	154	1.96%	2.74%	2.43%
Native American or Alaska Native alone (NH)	1	7	7	0.02%	0.11%	0.11%
Asian alone (NH)	127	173	175	2.14%	2.77%	2.77%
Native Hawaiian or Pacific Islander alone (NH)	0	7	2	0.00%	0.11%	0.03%
Other race alone (NH)	6	10	10	0.10%	0.16%	0.16%
Mixed race or Multiracial (NH)	46	57	210	0.78%	0.91%	3.32%
Hispanic or Latino (any race)	368	464	665	6.20%	7.43%	10.51%
Total	5,932	6,242	6,329	100.00%	100.00%	100.00%

=== 2020 census ===
As of the 2020 census, Ramtown had a population of 6,329. The median age was 39.9 years. 23.1% of residents were under the age of 18 and 12.9% of residents were 65 years of age or older. For every 100 females there were 93.8 males, and for every 100 females age 18 and over there were 93.1 males age 18 and over.

100.0% of residents lived in urban areas, while 0.0% lived in rural areas.

There were 2,105 households in Ramtown, of which 39.8% had children under the age of 18 living in them. Of all households, 71.8% were married-couple households, 8.7% were households with a male householder and no spouse or partner present, and 15.9% were households with a female householder and no spouse or partner present. About 11.0% of all households were made up of individuals and 5.7% had someone living alone who was 65 years of age or older.

There were 2,130 housing units, of which 1.2% were vacant. The homeowner vacancy rate was 0.4% and the rental vacancy rate was 0.0%.

=== 2010 census ===
The 2010 United States census counted 6,242 people, 1,924 households, and 1,687 families in the CDP. The population density was 2,847.4 people per square mile (1,099.4 people/km^{2}). There were 1,963 housing units at an average density of 895.4 units per square mile (345.7 units/km^{2}). The racial makeup was 91.53% (5,713) White, 2.84% (177) Black or African American, 0.11% (7) Native American, 2.77% (173) Asian, 0.11% (7) Pacific Islander, 1.43% (89) from other races, and 1.22% (76) from two or more races. Hispanic or Latino of any race were 7.43% (464) of the population.

Of the 1,924 households, 48.0% had children under the age of 18; 75.2% were married couples living together; 9.4% had a female householder with no husband present and 12.3% were non-families. Of all households, 9.9% were made up of individuals and 2.9% had someone living alone who was 65 years of age or older. The average household size was 3.24 and the average family size was 3.49.

28.4% of the population were under the age of 18, 9.4% from 18 to 24, 24.3% from 25 to 44, 32.1% from 45 to 64, and 5.8% who were 65 years of age or older. The median age was 38.0 years. For every 100 females, the population had 96.7 males. For every 100 females ages 18 and older there were 94.2 males.

=== 2000 census ===
As of the 2000 United States census there were 5,932 people, 1,742 households, and 1,576 families living in the CDP. The population density was 1,111.8 people/km^{2} (2,880 people/mi^{2}). There were 1,788 housing units at an average density of 335.1 units/km^{2} (868 units/mi^{2}). The racial makeup of the CDP was 92.99% White, 2.02% African American, 0.02% Native American, 2.19% Asian, 1.48% from other races, and 1.30% from two or more races. Hispanic or Latino of any race were 6.20% of the population.

There were 1,742 households, out of which 60.9% had children under the age of 18 living with them, 80.3% were married couples living together, 7.5% had a female householder with no husband present, and 9.5% were non-families. 7.2% of all households were made up of individuals, and 1.5% had someone living alone who was 65 years of age or older. The average household size was 3.41 and the average family size was 3.60.

In the CDP the age distribution of the population shows 36.1% under the age of 18, 5.8% from 18 to 24, 35.8% from 25 to 44, 18.2% from 45 to 64, and 4.1% who were 65 years of age or older. The median age was 33 years. For every 100 females, there were 97.2 males. For every 100 females age 18 and over, there were 95.9 males.

The median income for a household in the CDP was $73,339, and the median income for a family was $74,125. Males had a median income of $57,429 versus $38,274 for females. The per capita income for the CDP was $23,042. About 2.8% of families and 3.1% of the population were below the poverty line, including 3.5% of those under age 18 and none of those age 65 or over.

== Education ==
Three of the Howell Township Public Schools are located within Ramtown, Ramtown Elementary, Greenville Elementary, and Howell Middle School South. Greenville school serves children grades K-2, Ramtown serves children grades 3–5, and Middle School South serves children grades 6–8. All three schools are located next to each other and all students are provided transportation. All students are not Ramtown residents, for example, students who live in the Newbury part of Howell are districted to attend Middle School South.

Students in public school for ninth through twelfth grades attend either Howell High School, Freehold Township High School or Colts Neck High School (depending on home address), as part of the Freehold Regional High School District. Students are also given the option to join a program and attend one of the several other high schools a part of the high school district.
