= Brick Township Reservoir =

- Location within New Jersey Location within the United States
- Location: Monmouth County, New Jersey and Ocean County, New Jersey
- Coordinates: 40°07′38″N 74°07′14″W
- Type: Reservoir
- Primary inflows: Metedeconk River
- Basin countries: United States
- Surface area: 90 acres (36 ha)

The 120-acre Brick Township Reservoir site, located on Herbertsville and Sally Ike Roads is a source of municipal water for towns in Ocean County, New Jersey and is owned by the Brick Township Municipal Utilities Authority. The reservoir, while often referred to as "Brick Reservoir" is actually located in both Brick and Wall Townships, with 80 of the 120 acres within Wall Township borders. Through a joint agreement with Wall Township, police, fire and first aid protection for the reservoir are provided by Brick Township.

The Brick Reservoir is a pumped reservoir that draws its water from the Metedeconk River watershed unlike the nearby Manasquan Reservoir which uses the Manasquan River watershed as its source. The reservoir can pump up to 24 million US gallons (91,000 m^{3}) of water daily through its 4.7-mile pipeline connection to the river. When the reservoir basin is filled to capacity, it covers approximately 90 acres (36 ha) of the property.

The $19.4 million reservoir opened May 7, 2005, is 90 feet (27 m) deep and has a capacity of 1 billion gallons.

== History ==
The reservoir is constructed on the site of an abandoned gravel pit, the authority purchased the property in April 1996 for $810,000, which was mostly funded through a 30-year lease to a communication company for a cell phone tower.

To prepare the former gravel mining site for use as a reservoir existing buildings and debris were removed, including approximately 33,500 tons of steel slag and 7,000 tons of Kaofin, a legally dumped by-product from Marcal Paper corporation. An additional 1,000,000 cubic yards of overburden material were excavated and removed from the site.

At the time of the reservoir's construction it was only the second fully lined reservoir in the United States. The reservoir's design is based on an existing lined reservoir in Colorado. The reservoir's liner is 40 millimeters thick and covered by 18 inches of soil with a narrow rock breakwater surrounding the shore line to protect against wave erosion. The design life of the reservoir is anticipated to be around 75–100 years.

== Recreation ==
There is a public 1.6 miles (2.6 km) perimeter trail which encircles the reservoir. Fishing is permitted on the reservoir and there are several 40-by-100-foot fishing stations located on the site.
