= Metedeconk =

Metedeconk may refer to:

- Metedeconk and Metedeconk Neck, villages in Brick Township, New Jersey, U.S.
- Metedeconk River, a tributary of Barnegat Bay in New Jersey
  - North Branch Metedeconk River, a tributary of the above
  - South Branch Metedeconk River, a tributary of the above
