= Jerseyville =

Jerseyville may refer to:

- Jerseyville, Illinois, United States
- Jerseyville, New Jersey, United States
- Jerseyville, Ontario, Canada
- Jerseyville, New South Wales, Australia
