= Howell Township, New Jersey =

Township in Monmouth County, New Jersey, US

- Township
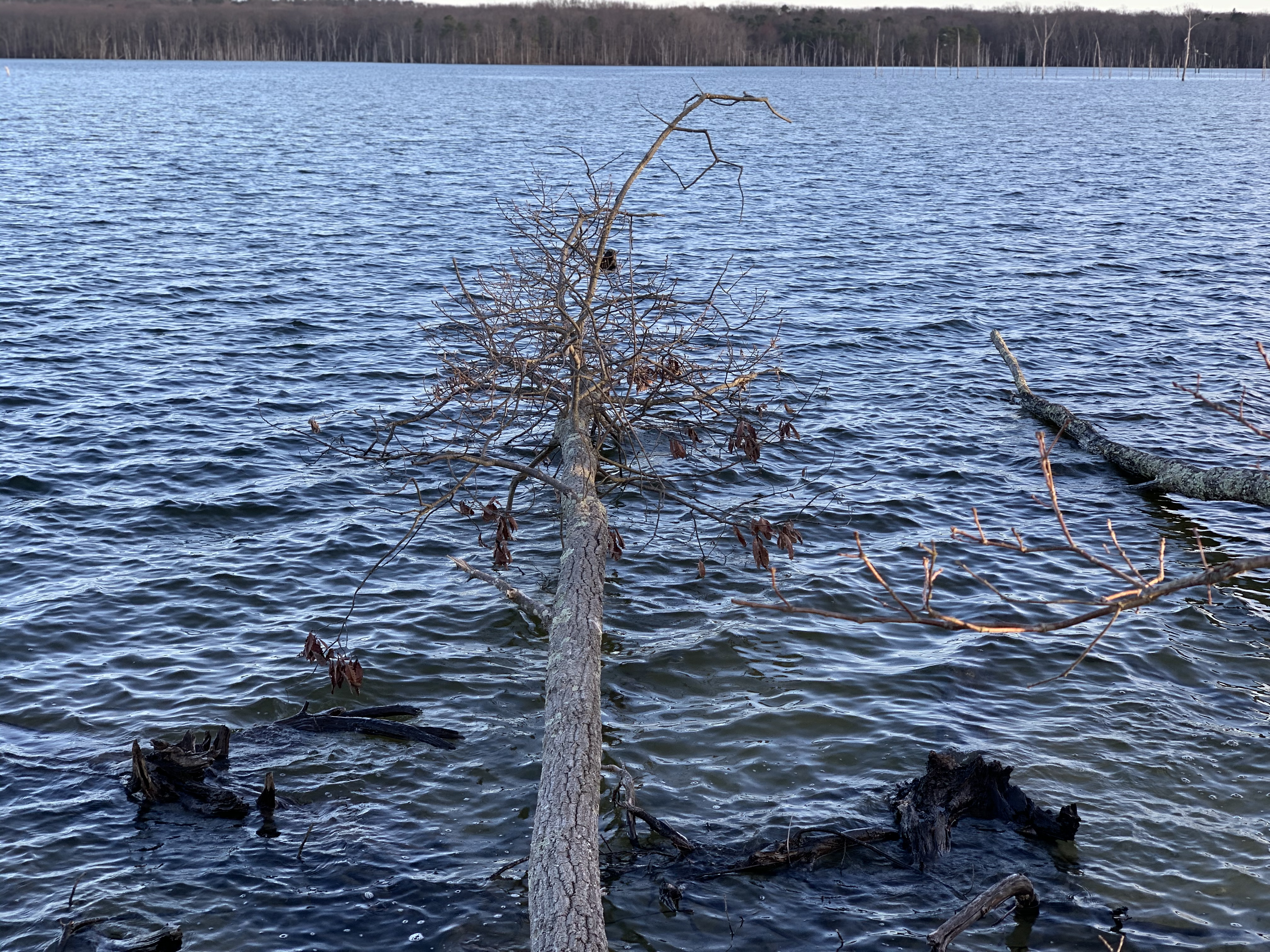
- Manasquan Reservoir

- Coat of arms

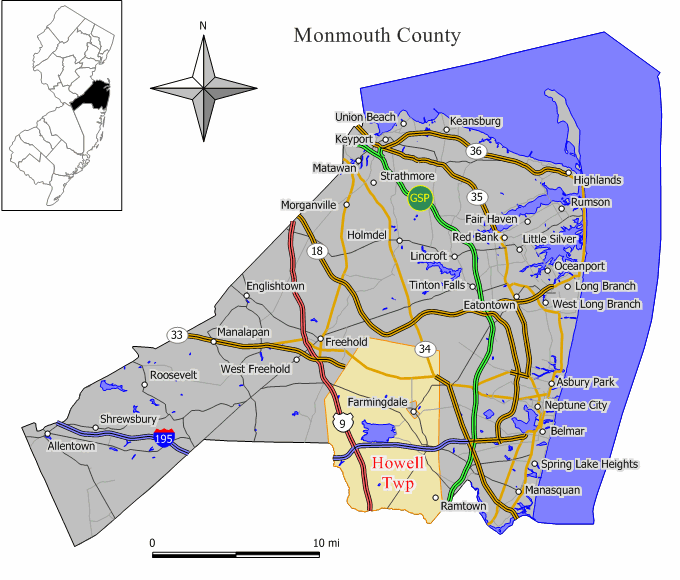
- Location of Howell Township in Monmouth County highlighted in orange (right). Inset map: Location of Monmouth County in New Jersey highlighted in black (left).
- Interactive map of Howell Township, New Jersey
- Location in Monmouth County Location in New Jersey Location in the United States
- Coordinates: 40.178108°N 74.206225°W
- Country: United States
- State: New Jersey
- County: Monmouth
- Incorporated: February 23, 1801
- Named for: Richard Howell

Government
  - Type: Faulkner Act (council–manager)
  - Body: Township Council
  - Mayor: John Leggio (R, term ends December 31, 2028)
  - Manager: John Gross
  - Municipal clerk: Allison Ciranni

Area
  - Total: 61.21 sq mi (158.54 km^{2})
  - Land: 60.27 sq mi (156.10 km^{2})
  - Water: 0.94 sq mi (2.44 km^{2}) 1.54%
  - Rank: 21st of 565 in state 1st of 53 in county
- Elevation: 98 ft (30 m)

Population (2020)
  - Total: 53,537
  - Estimate (2025): 55,156 ▲
  - Rank: 35th of 565 in state 2nd of 53 in county
  - Density: 915/sq mi (353/km^{2})
  - Rank: 397th of 565 in state 47th of 53 in county
- Time zone: UTC−05:00 (Eastern (EST))
  - Summer (DST): UTC−04:00 (Eastern (EDT))
- ZIP Code: 07731 – Howell; 07727 – Farmingdale; 07728 – Freehold
- Area codes: 732 and 848
- FIPS code: 3402533300
- GNIS feature ID: 0882113
- Website: www.twp.howell.nj.us

Howell Township is a township in Monmouth County, in the U.S. state of New Jersey. The township is the largest municipality in the county by total area, comprising about 61.21 square miles (158.5 km^{2}). It is located in the New York Metro Area and has been a steadily growing bedroom community of New York City. As of the 2020 United States census, the township's population was 53,537, its highest decennial count ever and an increase of 2,462 (+4.8%) from the 2010 census count of 51,075, which in turn reflected an increase of 2,172 (+4.4%) from the 48,903 counted in the 2000 census.

== History ==
=== Native American and early European settlement ===
The area surrounding the Manasquan River and its watershed, which contains modern-day Howell, was originally settled by Paleo-Indians as early as 9,000 BC. The Paleo-Indians in the region would later become the Lenape people, and the area was included in their territorial settlement of Lenapehoking. The Lenape who inhabited the area spoke the Northern dialect of Unami, and several of their most prominent footpaths would later be used as guiding tracks for roadways, including sections of U.S. Route 9 and Route 33.

Prior to major settling in the area by Europeans, the land was designated as part of the Dutch New Netherland colony, before being handed over to the British Empire as part of East Jersey and later being merged into the British New Jersey Colony. European settlement in the area began around the 1760s, driven by the search for agriculturally fertile soil.

=== Founding and early history (19th century) ===
Howell Township was incorporated as a township by an act of the New Jersey Legislature on February 23, 1801, from portions of Shrewsbury Township. Portions of the township were later taken to form Brick Township in the newly created Ocean County (February 15, 1850), and Wall Township (March 7, 1851). The township was named for Richard Howell, who served from 1794 to 1801 as the third Governor of New Jersey.

Initially founded by Benjamin Howell as the Monmouth Furnace, engineer and philanthropist James P. Allaire purchased and expanded the facility in 1822, renaming it to the Howell Works; this facility harvested and processed bog iron to provide pig iron for Allaire Iron Works, which was a leading supplier of iron in the 19th century. Allaire Village was a bustling mill town at the height of the mining operations, and which has since been preserved alongside the remains of the Howell Works facility as Allaire State Park, located within Howell and neighboring Wall Township.

=== 20th century ===
On April 8, 1903, Farmingdale was incorporated as a borough from Howell.

In 1907, journalist Arthur Brisbane, who had recently purchased the then-abandoned Howell Works, purchased around 5,000 acres (2,000 ha) of land in Howell to create the Howell Tuberculosis Preventorium for Children, which operated from 1909 to 1960; the site was later converted into the Howell Municipal Complex, which houses the local branch of the Monmouth County Library, a senior center, police and court building, public works facility, and the former town hall. The road that connected and passed through the site is named Preventorium Road.

In 1929, southern portions of Howell were ceded to Jackson and Lakewood townships in Ocean County.

=== 21st century ===
Some scenes for the 2005 War of the Worlds remake were filmed in Howell, and a neighborhood called Ardena Acres was recreated as a set and left standing in Universal Studios Hollywood.

On October 16, 2012, the Howell town hall was formally relocated from the Municipal Complex on Preventorium Road to the former Global Corporate Center building on US Route 9 North, following extensive renovations and relocation of the remaining tenants.

In June 2017, two separate tornadoes, both rated EF0 on the Enhanced Fujita scale, struck the township within minutes of each other, causing notable damage and knocking out electricity. The first and most damaging one struck the Fort Plains area along US Route 9 at 7:21 PM, lifting up occupied vehicles and uprooting trees as well as damaging a Home Depot, Chase Bank, strip mall, and local ice cream parlor. The second one struck around 6 minutes later within Oak Glen Park, uprooting or breaking multiple trees which forced the park to temporarily close.

Roughly six years later in April 2023, a tornado rated EF-2 struck Howell and neighboring Jackson Township near the Aldrich Road area. The National Weather Service confirmed that the tornado was 50 yards wide and 1.4 miles in length. It was one of the strongest tornadoes to have hit the state, as it was part of four separate powerful tornadoes that had also impacted the state that same day.

==== Alleged ethnic profiling by local officials ====
On July 25, 2025, former Township Manager Joseph Clark filed a lawsuit, alleging that Mayor John Leggio, Councilman Ian Nadel, and other local officials had suggested new local ordinances that would have required tenants in the township to provide proof of residency in order to approve Certificates of Occupancy (CO), as well as measures to cross-reference local arrest records with a CO registry, a move alleged to racially profile undocumented Hispanic renters. Clark resigned from his role 2 weeks prior, on July 11.

On September 5, 2025, then-Deputy Township Manager Matthew Howard filed a similar suit in the New Jersey Superior Court, alleging that the township "weaponize housing regulations to punish individuals based on their ethnicity, immigration status, and/or perceived national origin". Howard resigned from his role later that month.

Both suits alleged that Mayor John Leggio and Councilman Ian Nadel suggested searching through residents' garbage in an effort to find bottles of Modelo, a Mexican beer brand, to target Hispanic residents. Howard also alleged that Councilman Nadel sought to have code enforcement employees stake out a home because it was "owned by Jews" and was used to celebrate the Sabbath.

== Geography ==
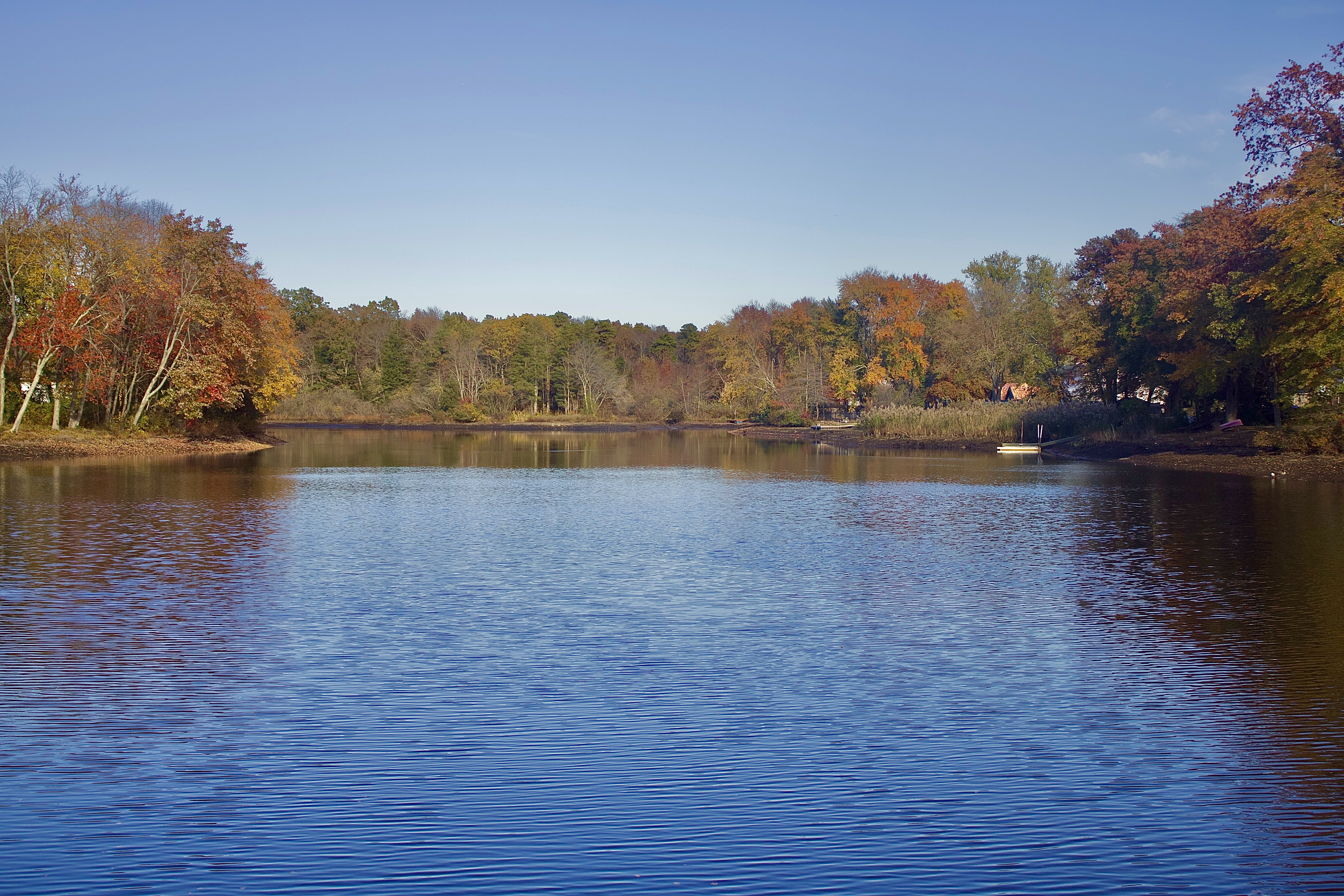
Aldrich Lake

According to the United States Census Bureau, the township had a total area of 61.21 square miles (158.54 km^{2}), including 60.27 square miles (156.10 km^{2}) of land and 0.94 square miles (2.44 km^{2}) of water (1.54%).

Howell was formed from territory taken from Shrewsbury Township under an act of the New Jersey General Assembly passed February 23, 1801. The township, as formed, included in addition to its present area all of what is now Wall Township, Lakewood Township, Brick Township, and all the boroughs along the Atlantic Ocean from Barnegat Inlet of the Shark River Inlet at Belmar.

Ramtown (with a 2020 Census population of 6,329) is an unincorporated community and census-designated place (CDP) located within Howell Township.

Other unincorporated communities, localities and place names located partially or completely within the township include Adelphia, Ardena, Ardmore Estates, Bergerville, Candlewood, Collingwood Park, Fairfield, Fort Plains, Freewood Acres, Jerseyville, Lake Club, Land of Pines, Larrabees, Lippencotts Corner, Lower Squankum, Matthews, Maxim, Oak Glen, Parkway Pines, Salem Hill, Shacks Corner, Southard, Squankum, West Farms, Winston Park, Wyckoff Mills and Yellow Brook.

The township completely surrounds Farmingdale, making it part of 21 pairs of "doughnut towns" in the state, where one municipality entirely surrounds another. The township borders Colts Neck, Freehold Township and Wall Township in Monmouth County; and Brick, Jackson and Lakewood in Ocean County.

=== Ecology ===
According to the A. W. Kuchler U.S. potential natural vegetation types, Howell Township would predominantly feature an Appalachian Oak (type 104) vegetation type, with an Eastern Hardwood Forest (vegetation form 25).

Howell is located within the Outer Coastal Plain ecoregion of New Jersey, characterized by sandy soils and a mix of pine-oak forests and wetlands. Its natural ecosystems include upland oak-hickory woodlands, pine barrens transition zones, and freshwater marshes. These habitats support white-tailed deer, red foxes, wild turkeys, box turtles, and amphibians like spring peepers and wood frogs.

The Manasquan Reservoir, a 1,204-acre (487 ha) site operated by the Monmouth County Park System, is one of Howell’s most ecologically significant areas. It provides habitat for nesting bald eagles, ospreys, great blue herons, and migratory waterfowl. The park also features native wetland plant species, reforested buffer zones, and interpretive trails for conservation education.

Bear Swamp Natural Area, located along Maxim-Southard Road, is a forested wetland that supports a mix of red maple, tupelo, and sweetgum trees, and functions as a critical recharge area for the township’s aquifer. Local conservation groups have identified it as a biodiversity hotspot and a priority for habitat protection.

The Howell Environmental Commission works with local and regional partners to preserve open space, implement native planting projects, and maintain an index of environmentally sensitive lands. In 2022, the township adopted a resolution endorsing New Jersey's Wildlife Action Plan to guide long-term stewardship of native habitats and species.

Howell is home to two EPA-designated Superfund site; The Bog Creek Farm Superfund Site located on County Road 547, and the Zschiegner Refining Company Site located on Maxim-Southard Road.

=== Major bodies of water ===
The township is located near the geographical center of New Jersey, on a ridge within Central Jersey. As such, northern sections of the township fall within the hillier terrain and fertile soil found in the Inner Coastal Plain, while southern sections of the township tend to have the flatter terrain and sandier soil found in the Outer Coastal Plain. The township is located within the sphere of influence of the Jersey Shore, while also being located relatively near the Raritan Bayshore, the Raritan Valley, and the Pine Barrens. Notable bodies of water inside the township include:

==== Lakes ====
- Manasquan Reservoir
- Aldrich Lake
- Echo Lake
- Lake Louise

==== Rivers ====
- Manasquan River (Raritan River watershed)
- Metedeconk River (Barnegat Bay watershed)
  - North Branch Metedeconk River
  - South Branch Metedeconk River
- Swimming River (Navesink River watershed)
  - Mine Brook

== Demographics ==
Historical population
Census	Pop.	Note	%±
1810	2,780		—
1820	3,354		20.6%
1830	4,141		23.5%
1840	4,699		13.5%
1850	4,058	*	−13.6%
1860	2,574	*	−36.6%
1870	3,371		31.0%
1880	3,374		0.1%
1890	3,018		−10.6%
1900	3,103		2.8%
1910	2,703	*	−12.9%
1920	2,549		−5.7%
1930	3,146		23.4%
1940	4,039		28.4%
1950	6,696		65.8%
1960	11,153		66.6%
1970	21,756		95.1%
1980	25,065		15.2%
1990	38,987		55.5%
2000	48,903		25.4%
2010	51,075		4.4%
2020	53,537		4.8%
2025 (est.)	55,156		3.0%
Population sources: 1810–1920 1840 1850–1870; 1850 1870 1880–1890; 1890–1910 1910–1930 1940–2000; 2000 2010 2020 * = Lost territory in previous decade.

Howell’s demographics fall in line with those of the broader Monmouth County area. The five most common reported ancestries and their percentage of the township’s population are:

1. Italian (28.2%)
2. Irish (23.8%)
3. Other groups (19.4%), of which
  1. Puerto Rican (3.45%)
  2. Mexican (1.69%)
  3. South American (1.67%)
  4. Indian (1.51%)
  5. Central Americans (1.24%)
4. German (13.8%), and
5. Polish (9.9%)

The township is also home to a small, but notable, Kalmyk American community located in the Freewood Acres neighborhood.

=== 2010 census ===
The 2010 United States census counted 51,075 people, 17,260 households, and 13,618 families in the township. The population density was 843.4 per square mile (325.6/km^{2}). There were 17,979 housing units at an average density of 296.9 per square mile (114.6/km^{2}). The racial makeup was 88.30% (45,100) White, 3.65% (1,865) Black or African American, 0.15% (79) Native American, 4.52% (2,309) Asian, 0.05% (23) Pacific Islander, 1.61% (822) from other races, and 1.72% (877) from two or more races. Hispanic or Latino of any race were 8.13% (4,153) of the population.

Of the 17,260 households, 39.9% had children under the age of 18; 65.4% were married couples living together; 9.7% had a female householder with no husband present and 21.1% were non-families. Of all households, 17.3% were made up of individuals and 7.7% had someone living alone who was 65 years of age or older. The average household size was 2.95 and the average family size was 3.37.

26.3% of the population were under the age of 18, 8.4% from 18 to 24, 24.0% from 25 to 44, 31.2% from 45 to 64, and 10.0% who were 65 years of age or older. The median age was 39.6 years. For every 100 females, the population had 96.3 males. For every 100 females ages 18 and older there were 93.5 males.

The Census Bureau showed that in 2010 median household income was $89,287 and the median family income was $102,015. Males had a median income of $71,499 versus $54,308 for females. The per capita income for the township was $35,489. About 4.5% of families and 5.2% of the population were below the poverty line, including 4.5% of those under age 18 and 8.8% of those age 65 or over.

=== 2000 census ===
As of the 2000 United States census there were 48,903 people, 16,063 households, and 13,011 families residing in the township. The population density was 802.8 inhabitants per square mile (310.0/km^{2}). There were 16,572 housing units at an average density of 272.1 per square mile (105.1/km^{2}). The racial makeup of the township was 89.99% White, 3.56% African American, 0.12% Native American, 3.58% Asian, 0.01% Pacific Islander, 1.29% from other races, and 1.45% from two or more races. Hispanic or Latino of any race were 5.34% of the population.

The most common first ancestry group cited by Howell residents in the 2000 Census was German (17.7%), English (12.7%), Irish (11.5%), United States or American (9.9%), Polish (6.6%), French (except Basque) (4.0%) and Italian (2.7%).

There were 16,063 households, out of which 47.1% had children under the age of 18 living with them, 69.4% were married couples living together, 8.6% had a female householder with no husband present, and 19.0% were non-families. 15.4% of all households were made up of individuals, and 7.1% had someone living alone who was 65 years of age or older. The average household size was 3.04 and the average family size was 3.42.

In the township the population was spread out, with 30.9% under the age of 18, 6.0% from 18 to 24, 32.8% from 25 to 44, 21.6% from 45 to 64, and 8.8% who were 65 years of age or older. The median age was 36 years. For every 100 females, there were 95.3 males. For every 100 females age 18 and over, there were 91.7 males.

The median income for a household in the township in 2000 was $68,069, and the median income for a family was $74,623. Males had a median income of $55,349 versus $34,722 for females. The per capita income for the township was $26,143. About 3.1% of families and 4.2% of the population were below the poverty line, including 4.2% of those under age 18 and 6.4% of those age 65 or over.

== Economy ==
Howell Township has a mixed economy, with residents employed across a variety of industries both locally and in the broader New York and Philadelphia metropolitan areas. According to the U.S. Census Bureau's 2022 American Community Survey, the top employment sectors for Howell residents include:

- Health care and social assistance (16.3%)
- Retail trade (13.8%)
- Educational services (11.1%)
- Professional, scientific, and technical services (8.2%)
- Construction (7.6%)

Many residents commute to jobs in neighboring municipalities, with a significant portion working in Freehold Township, Lakewood, Neptune, and Toms River. Others commute to New York City, Newark, Jersey City, and other points north via US 9 or I-195. According to the North Jersey Transportation Planning Authority, Howell is classified as a bedroom community, with over 70% of working residents employed outside the township.

Major local employers include:

- Howell Township Public Schools
- Monmouth County government agencies
- CentraState Healthcare System** (based in nearby Freehold)
- Retail anchors on Route 9

The New Jersey Department of Labor and Workforce Development identifies Howell as part of the Monmouth-Ocean Labor Area, with local economic strengths in health services, education, construction, and seasonal tourism-related sectors.

=== Agriculture ===
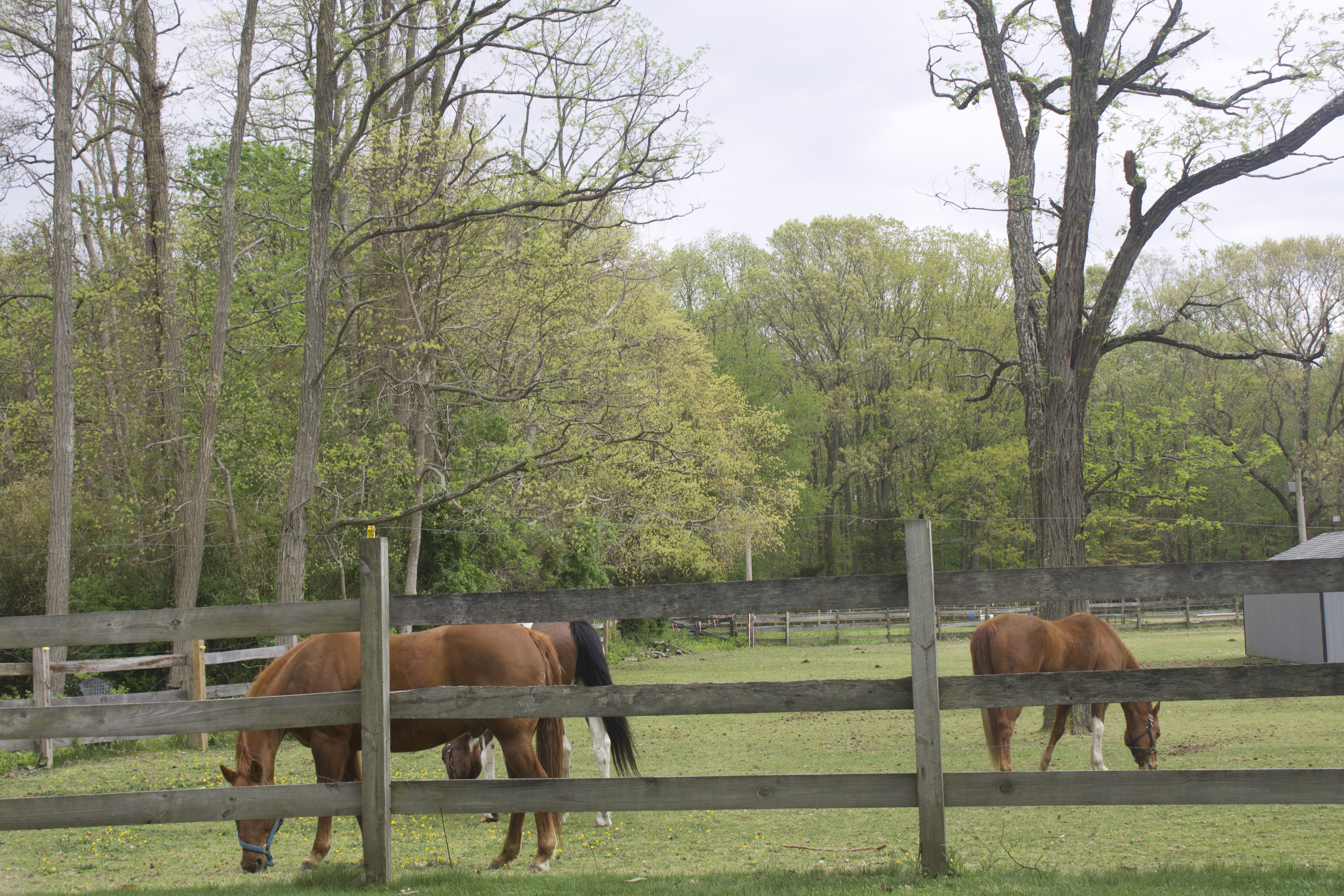
One of many horse farms in Howell

Monmouth County was primarily a rural agricultural area until the 1940s, when highway expansion and the end of World War II lead to greater residential development. Despite increasing suburbanization within the county, Howell Township maintains a strong agricultural presence, encompassing crop farms, nurseries, and a significant equestrian community. The township's commitment to preserving its rural heritage is evident in its support for local farming operations and equine facilities.

=== Commerce ===
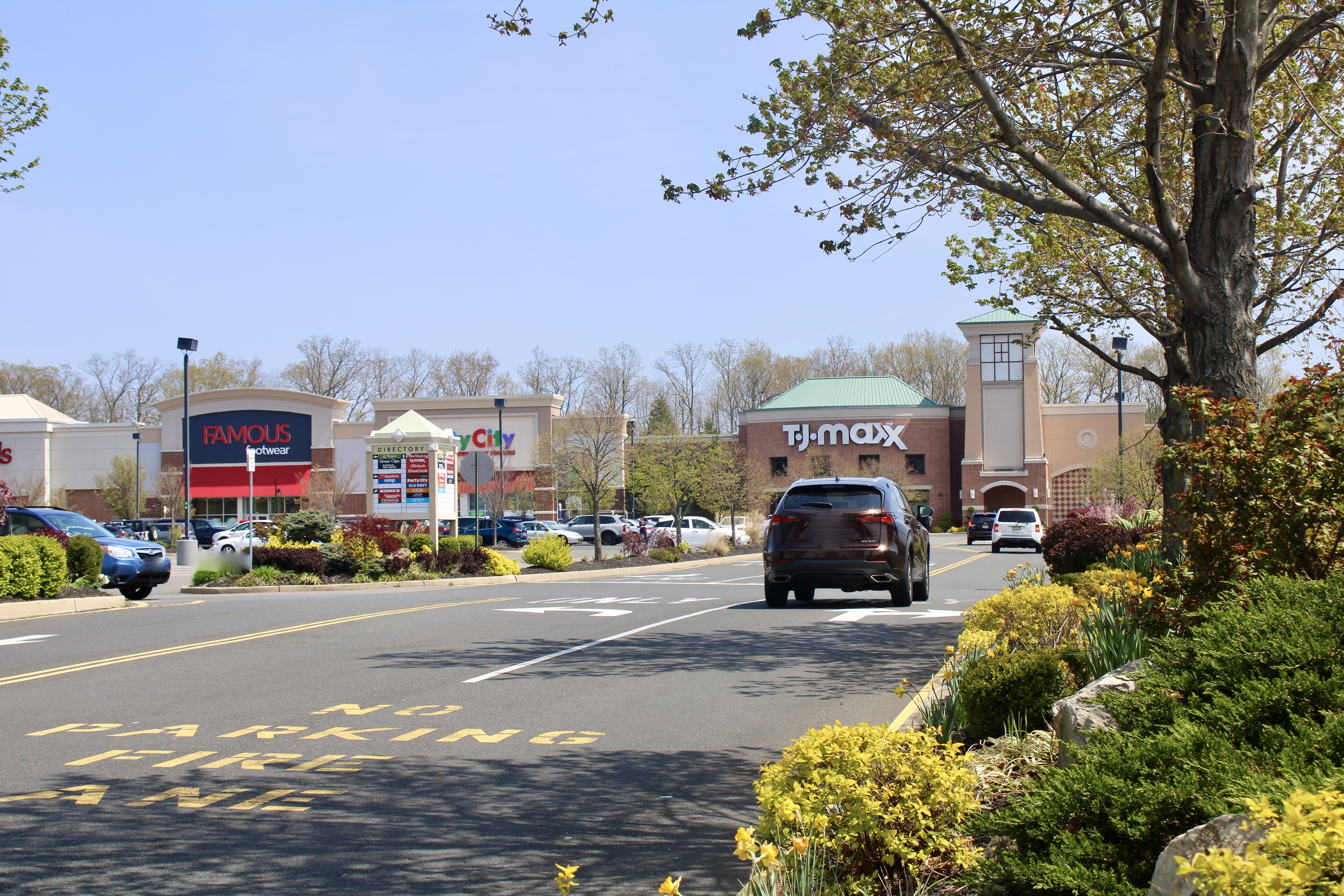
Howell Commons, located on Route 9 in Howell

Howell Township hosts a variety of shopping centers, primarily along Route 9, serving both local residents and visitors:

- Aldrich Plaza, located at 4075 Route 9, is a 127,700-square-foot (11,860 m^{2}) community center featuring a mix of retail, restaurant, and service tenants. Anchored by Walgreens, the plaza attracts approximately 1.4 million visits annually, is located at the intersection of Route 9 South and Aldrich Road.
- Adelphia Plaza, situated at 949 Adelphia-Farmingdale Road, offers retail spaces catering to the local community. The plaza includes a variety of tenants and provides convenient shopping options for residents in the Adelphia section of Howell Township.
- Greenleaf at Howell, located at 5369 Route 9, is a 52-acre (21 ha) shopping plaza designed with 1,717 parking spaces for convenient storefront access. The center features a dynamic mix of national retailers and serves as a major shopping destination in the region.
- Howell Commons, at 4701–4799 Route 9, comprises 36 stores offering a range of shopping and dining options. The center includes national retailers and provides ample parking for shoppers.
- Lanes Mill Marketplace, located at the intersection of Route 9 and Lanes Mill Road, hosts 16 stores, including major retailers such as Lowe’s, Target, and Stop & Shop. The marketplace offers a variety of shopping and dining experiences for the community.
- Regal Plaza, situated at 2342 Route 9, features a range of tenants including White Castle, Dollar General, and The Learning Experience. The plaza encompasses 24,000 square feet (2,200 m^{2}) of retail space and a 78,000-square-foot (7,200 m^{2}) storage facility.

Notable shopping destinations near Howell include:

- Freehold Raceway Mall in Freehold Township,
- Jackson Premium Outlets in Jackson Township, and
- Jersey Shore Premium Outlets in Tinton Falls

Neighboring Farmingdale serves as a 'downtown' area for the surrounding northern Howell area. Nearby Asbury Park and Freehold Borough also function as regional 'downtowns' for the township.

The Howell Chamber of Commerce, established in 1957, promotes local businesses and fosters economic growth within the township. The Chamber advocates for the diverse Howell business community, provides benefits to its members, and organizes events to encourage community engagement.

== Parks and recreation ==
Manasquan Reservoir offers nature and exercise-related activities such as fishing, boating, and bird watching, as well as large trails that loop around the reservoirs which are open for jogging, biking, dog walking, and horseback riding. The Manasquan Reservoir Environmental Center, open since 2001, offers nature exhibits where people can go see and learn about local wildlife; the center closed in 2024 for renovations and is expected to reopen in 2027.

Alfred C. Sauer Park at Echo Lake offers a dock for fishing and kayaking, a nature trail and a pavilion overlooking the lake which can be rented. There is no swimming but there are grills and picnic tables as well as a playground. In 2014, the township renamed the park in memory of Alfred C. Sauer, an environmentalist who worked to preserve the park and other natural environments in the township. Parts of Allaire State Park and the Edgar Felix Bikeway are found in Howell Township.

Oak Glen Park, located across Old Tavern Road from the Municipal Complex, features multiple athletics fields and a playground.

While not officially a park, the hill located behind the Monmouth County Library where the former town hall sits upon in the Municipal Complex, occasionally called Sledding Hill or Preventorium Hill, is a popular sledding and snowboarding location in the winter for local residents during the snowy season.

== Government ==
=== Local government ===
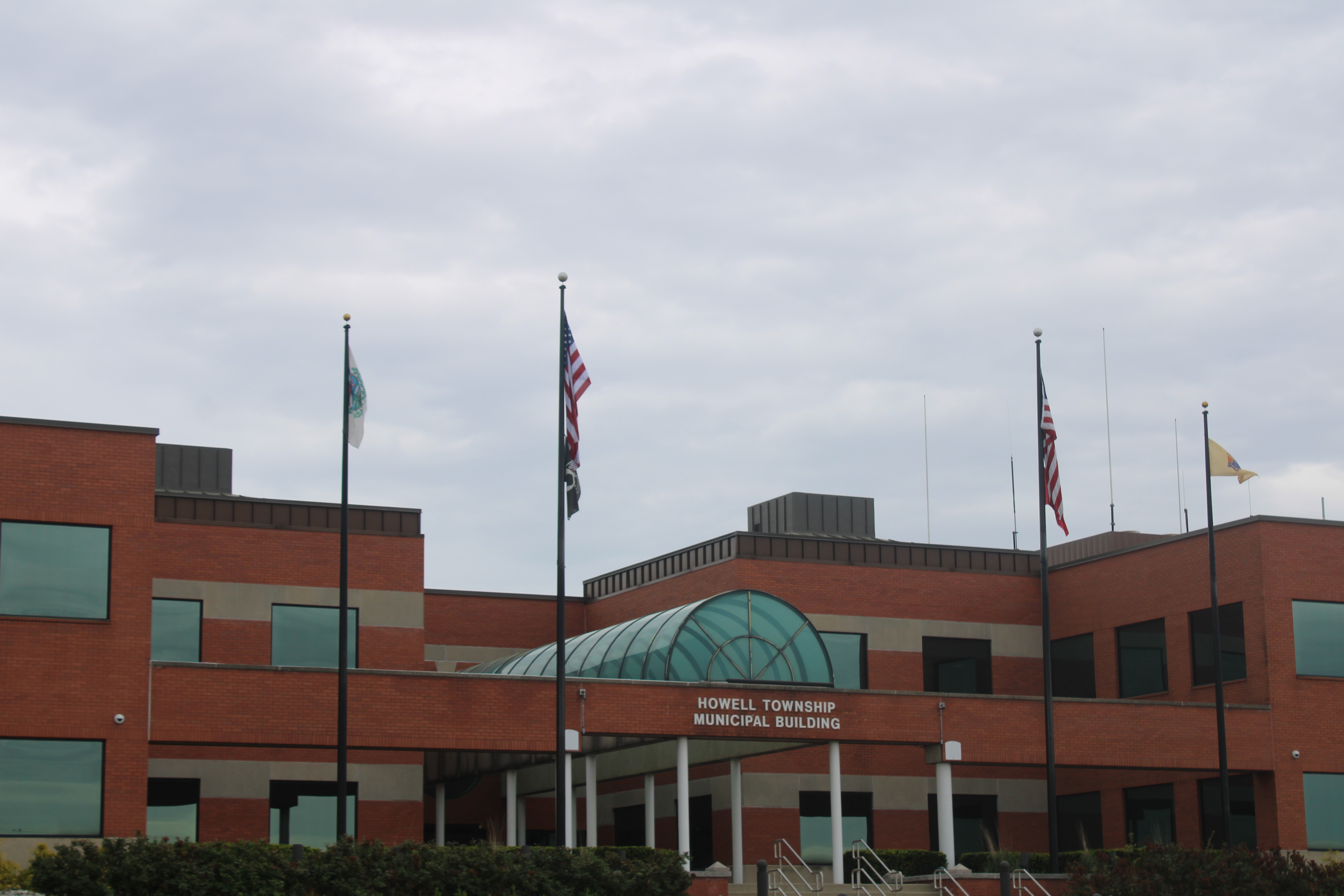
Howell Municipal Building

Howell Township operates within the Faulkner Act, formally known as the Optional Municipal Charter Law, under the Council-Manager form of municipal government. The township is one of 42 municipalities (of the 564) statewide that use this form of government. The governing body is comprised of the Mayor and the four-member Township Council, whose members are chosen in partisan voting to four-year terms of office on a staggered basis, with elections held in even-numbered years as part of the November general election; in a repeating election cycle, three council seats are up for election, followed by the remaining council seat and the mayoral seat two years later. At a reorganization meeting held after each election, the council selects the deputy mayor from among its members.

As of June 2026, the Mayor of Howell Township is Republican John Leggio, whose term of office ends December 31, 2028. Members of the Howell Township Council are Deputy Mayor Susan Fischer (R, 2026), Evelyn O'Donnell (R, 2028), Ian Nadel (R, 2026), and Michael Wrubel (R, 2026).

Former mayor Robert Walsh was named to fill the seat that became vacant when William Gotto took office as mayor in January 2013. Walsh's appointed portion of the term ended at the November 2013 general election, though Walsh was the only candidate to submit a petition to serve the balance of the term through December 2014.

The Township Manager is John Gross. Since August 2022, the Chief of the Howell Police Department is John Storrow.

=== Emergency services ===
==== Police ====
The Howell Township Police Department serves as the township’s primary law enforcement agency. Established in September of 1971, the department is currently headquartered at 300 Old Tavern Road in the Municipal Complex, and includes divisions for patrol operations, traffic safety, investigations, and school resource officers. It also oversees the township’s Emergency Medical Services (EMS) division.

==== Fire protection ====
Fire protection in Howell Township is provided by five volunteer fire departments, each assigned to a geographic fire district:

- Squankum - District 1: Serving eastern Howell, near Farmingdale and Allaire State Park
- Adelphia Fire Company – District 2: Serving the majority of northern Howell, above West Farms Road and towards Naval Weapons Station Earle
- Ramtown Fire Company – District 4: Serving south-eastern Howell, primarily around the Ramtown area
- Southard Fire Department – District 3: Covering south-western Howell, centered around the Southard area
- Freewood Acres - District 5: Covering western Howell, above I-195 and away from Manasquan Reservoir

These departments are coordinated through the Howell Township Fire Bureau, which handles code enforcement, fire investigations, and public fire safety education.

==== Emergency medical services ====
Emergency medical response is handled by a combination of municipal and volunteer EMS providers:

- Howell Township Police EMS: This division of the police department staffs multiple Basic Life Support (BLS) ambulances and responds to 911 medical emergencies across the township’s 64 square miles. Its team consists of EMTs and paramedics trained in prehospital emergency care.
- Howell Township First Aid and Rescue Squad #1: Founded in 1957, this all-volunteer organization provides emergency medical services, vehicle extrication, and rescue operations. In 2023, the squad answered over 1,500 calls and operates without charging residents, instead billing insurance providers to fund its operations.

Both providers work collaboratively to ensure timely and professional EMS response throughout Howell Township.

=== Federal, state and county representation ===
Howell Township is located in the 4th Congressional District and is part of New Jersey's 30th state legislative district.

For the 119th United States Congress, New Jersey's 4th congressional district is represented by Chris Smith (R, Manchester Township). New Jersey is represented in the United States Senate by Democrats Cory Booker (Newark, term ends 2027) and Andy Kim (Moorestown, term ends 2031).

For the 2026–2027 session, the 30th legislative district of the New Jersey Legislature is represented in the State Senate by Robert Singer (R, Lakewood Township) and in the General Assembly by Sean T. Kean (R, Wall Township) and Avi Schnall (D, Lakewood Township).

Monmouth County is governed by a Board of County Commissioners composed of five members who are elected at-large to serve three-year terms of office on a staggered basis, with either one or two seats up for election each year as part of the November general election. At an annual reorganization meeting held in the beginning of January, the board selects one of its members to serve as director and another as deputy director.

As of 2026, Monmouth County's Commissioners are Director Thomas A. Arnone (R, Neptune City, 2028),Deputy Director Nick DiRocco (R, Wall Township, 2028), Susan M. Kiley (R, Hazlet Township, 2027), Erik Anderson (R, Shrewsbury, 2026), and Ross F. Licitra (R, Marlboro Township, 2026).

Constitutional officers elected on a countywide basis are Clerk Christine Giordano Hanlon (R, 2030; Ocean Township), Sheriff Shaun Golden (R, 2028; Howell Township) and Surrogate Maureen Raisch (R, 2026; Middletown Township).

=== Politics ===
United States presidential election results for Howell
Year	Republican		Democratic		Third party(ies)	
Year	No.	%	No.	%	No.	%
2024	19,055	62.67%	10,881	35.79%	467	1.54%
2020	18,491	57.85%	13,004	40.68%	469	1.47%
2016	15,948	60.42%	9,505	36.01%	944	3.58%
2012	12,529	55.44%	9,762	43.19%	310	1.37%
2008	13,854	55.54%	10,790	43.26%	300	1.20%
2004	13,579	59.59%	8,990	39.45%	219	0.96%
2000	9,168	48.42%	8,939	47.21%	829	4.38%
1996	6,514	40.41%	7,522	46.66%	2,084	12.93%
1992	7,837	45.17%	5,686	32.77%	3,826	22.05%

As of March 2011, there were a total of 33,176 registered voters in Howell Township, of which 6,622 (20.0%) were registered as Democrats, 7,744 (23.3%) were registered as Republicans and 18,798 (56.7%) were registered as Unaffiliated. There were 12 voters registered to other parties.

In the 2024 presidential election, Republican Donald Trump received 62.7% of the vote (19,055 cast), ahead of Democrat Kamala Harris with 35.8% of the vote (10,881 votes), and other candidates with 1.5% (467 votes) among the 31,964 votes cast by the township's voters. In the 2020 presidential election, Republican Donald Trump received 57.8% of the vote (18,491 cast), ahead of Democrat Joe Biden with 40.7% of the vote (13,004 votes), and other candidates with 1.5% (469 votes) among the 31,964 votes cast by the township's voters. In the 2016 presidential election, Republican Donald Trump received 60.4% of the vote (15,808 cast), ahead of Democrat Hillary Clinton with 36.0% of the vote (9,430 votes), and other candidates with 3.5% (923 votes), among the 26,161 votes cast by the township's voters. In the 2012 presidential election, Republican Mitt Romney received 55.4% of the vote (12,529 cast), ahead of Democrat Barack Obama with 43.2% (9,762 votes), and other candidates with 1.4% (310 votes), among the 22,772 ballots cast by the township's 34,737 registered voters (171 ballots were spoiled), for a turnout of 65.6%.

Gubernatorial election results for Howell Township
Year	Republican		Democratic		Third party(ies)	
Year	No.	%	No.	%	No.	%
2025	14,496	61.00%	9,146	38.49%	120	0.51%
2021	12,869	65.19%	6,701	33.94%	172	0.87%
2017	8,481	60.54%	5,137	36.67%	391	2.79%
2013	9,999	73.45%	3,426	25.17%	189	1.39%
2009	11,187	68.96%	4,023	24.80%	1,013	6.24%
2005	8,070	56.89%	5,327	37.55%	788	5.56%

In the 2017 gubernatorial election, Republican Kim Guadagno received 60.5% of the vote (8,481 cast), ahead of Democrat Phil Murphy with 36.7% (5,137 votes), and other candidates with 2.8% (391 votes), among the 14,009 cast by the township's voters. In the 2013 gubernatorial election, Republican Chris Christie received 73.4% of the vote (9,999 cast), ahead of Democrat Barbara Buono with 25.2% (3,426 votes), and other candidates with 1.4% (189 votes), among the 13,788 ballots cast by the township's 34,992 registered voters (174 ballots were spoiled), for a turnout of 39.4%. In the 2009 gubernatorial election, Republican Chris Christie received 68.7% of the vote (11,187 ballots cast), ahead of Democrat Jon Corzine with 24.7% (4,023 votes), Independent Chris Daggett with 5.4% (886 votes) and other candidates with 0.8% (127 votes), among the 16,287 ballots cast by the township's 33,461 registered voters, yielding a 48.7% turnout.

United States Senate election results for Howell Township1
Year	Republican		Democratic		Third party(ies)	
Year	No.	%	No.	%	No.	%
2024	17,369	60.45%	10,693	37.21%	672	2.34%
2018	12,215	60.48%	7,311	36.20%	671	3.32%
2012	11,891	55.99%	8,871	41.77%	475	2.24%
2006	7,471	56.70%	5,117	38.84%	588	4.46%

United States Senate election results for Howell Township2
Year	Republican		Democratic		Third party(ies)	
Year	No.	%	No.	%	No.	%
2020	17,933	57.32%	12,640	40.40%	713	2.28%
2014	6,268	59.87%	3,979	38.00%	223	2.13%
2013	4,869	61.76%	2,925	37.10%	90	1.14%
2008	12,710	55.65%	9,249	40.50%	879	3.85%

== Education ==
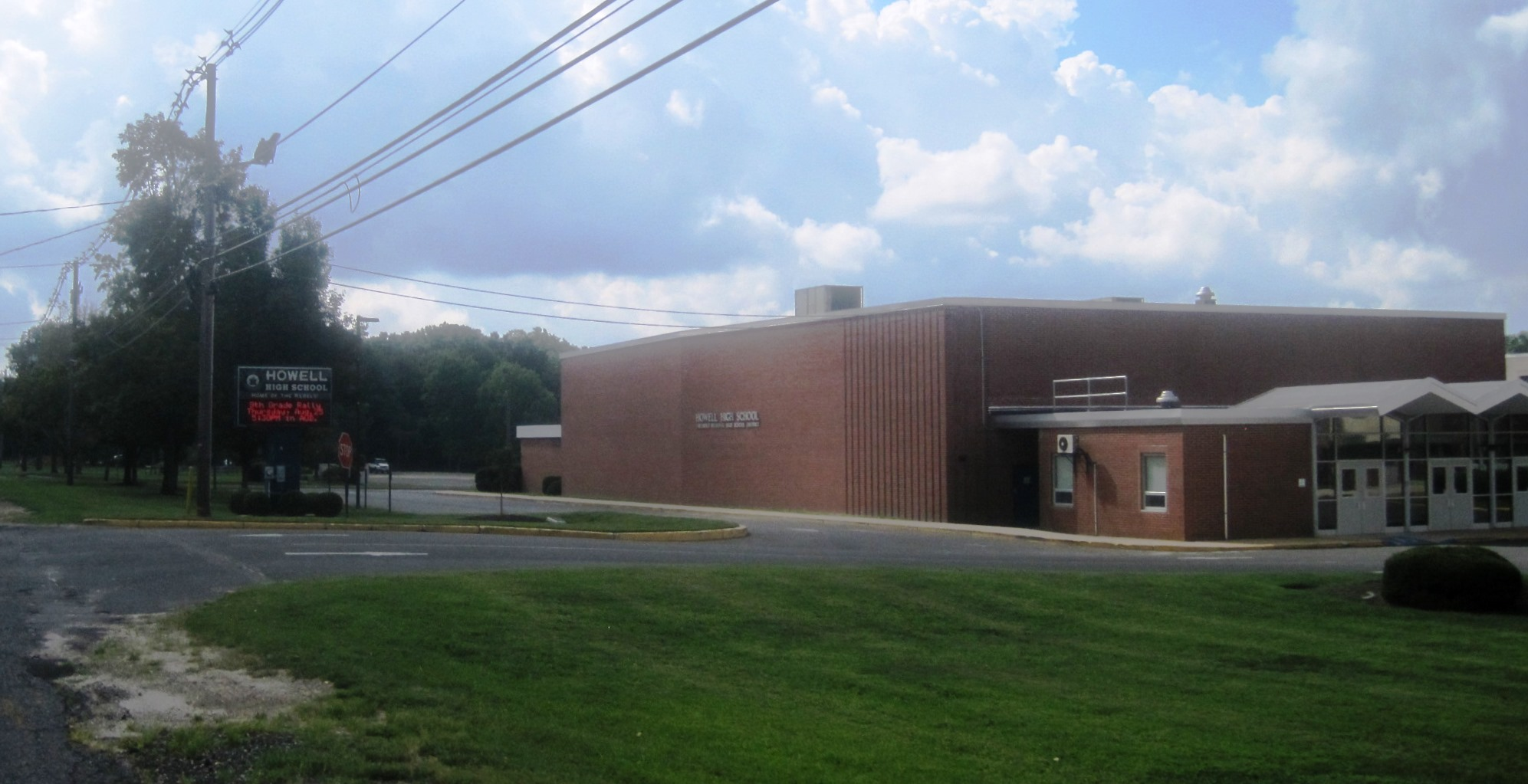
Howell High School, located on the corner of Southard Avenue and Squankum-Yellowbrook Road in Farmingdale

=== Prekindergarten to middle school ===
The Howell Township Public School District serves students from pre-kindergarten through eighth grade. As of the 2024–25 school year, the 12 schools that make up the district had a combined enrollment of 6,045 students and 553.52 FTE classroom teachers, for a student–teacher ratio of 10.92. Enrollment data from the National Center for Education Statistics clarifies that are two prekindergartens, 10 elementary schools, and two middle schools in the district, with the number of enrolled students:

==== Prekindergartens ====
- Adelphia Early Learning Center (357)
- Newbury Early Learning Center (365)

==== Elementary schools (K-5) ====
- Aldrich Elementary School (470)
- Ardena Elementary School (374)
- Greenville Elementary School (345)
- Edith M. Griebling Elementary School (457)
- Land O' Pines Elementary School (530)
- Memorial Elementary School (414)
- Ramtown Elementary School (483)
- Taunton Elementary School (389)

==== Middle schools (6-8) ====
- Howell Township Middle School North (970)
- Howell Township Middle School South (893)

=== High schools ===
Depending on their home address, Howell students in public school for ninth through twelfth grades are automatically districted to attend either Howell High School, Freehold Township High School or Colts Neck High School, which are all part of the Freehold Regional High School District (FRHSD). Students can also apply to participate in one of the Magnet Programs within any of the 6 schools in the FRHSD, allowing them to alternatively attend any high school in the district regardless of home address. The FRHSD board of education has nine members, who are elected to three-year terms from each of the constituent districts. Each member is allocated a fraction of a vote that totals to nine points, with Howell allocated two members, who each have 1.0 votes.

Students from Howell may also apply to attend one of the Monmouth County Vocational School District schools throughout Monmouth County.

=== Private schools ===
Bais Leah High School is a Jewish all-girls high school, located on the former campus of the Monmouth Academy day school which closed in 2011. For the 2023-24 school year, Bais Leah had 300 enrolled students and 7.5 FTE teachers, for a student-teacher ratio of 40.

Yeshiva Emek Hatorah is a Jewish all-boys high school. For the 2023-24 school year, Emek Hatorah had 112 enrolled students and 9.9 FTE teachers, for a student-teacher ratio of 11.3.

The Coastal Learning Center (CLC) - Monmouth Campus is a special education day school, specializing in helping children and young adults with behavioral, multiple, or other disabilities. The school offers education from the 4th grade to the 12th grade level. For the 2023-24 school year, CLC had 66 enrolled students, and 10 FTE teachers, for a student-teacher ratio of 6.6.

The former campus of Mother Seton Academy, a Catholic School for grades Pre-K–8, which operated under the auspices of the Roman Catholic Diocese of Trenton, is in the township. It formed in 2019 by the merger of St. Veronica School in Howell and St. Aloysius School in Jackson; the academy closed at the end of the 2021-22 school year due to declining enrollment, budget deficits, and complications from the COVID-19 pandemic.

== Media ==
The Asbury Park Press provides daily news coverage of the town. The government of Howell provides columns and commentary to The Howell Times, which is one of seven weekly papers from Micromedia Publications.

== Points of interest ==
- St. Alexander Nevsky Cathedral is a Russian Orthodox Church cathedral, originally established in 1936 and decorated with Byzantine-style frescos, that operates under the jurisdiction of the Russian Orthodox Church Outside Russia.
- The Mackenzie Museum and Library was the home of William Prickitt who led the 25th Regiment of the U.S. Colored Troops during the Civil War.

== Infrastructure ==
=== Transportation ===
==== Roads and highways ====
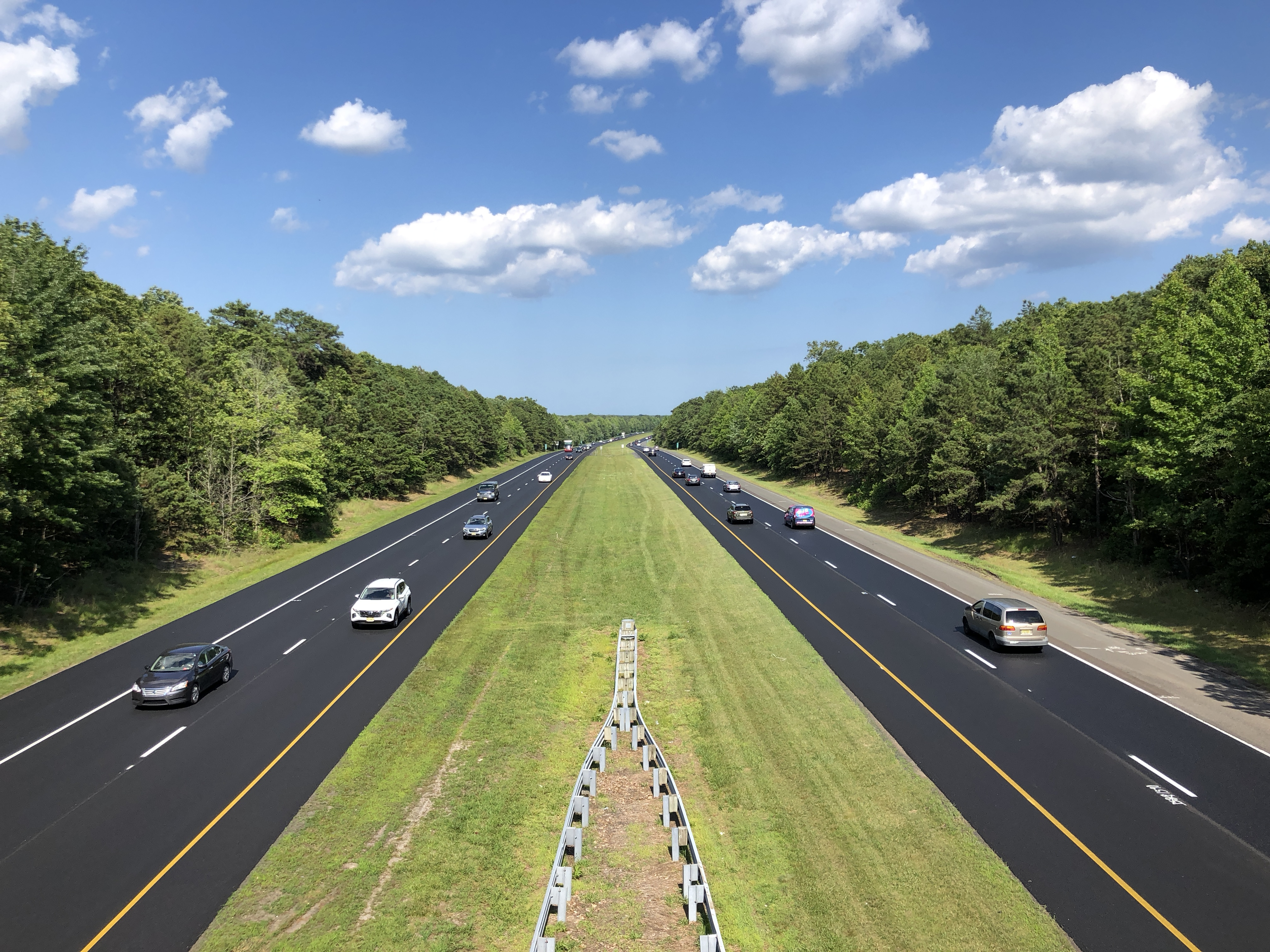
Interstate 195 eastbound in Howell Township

As of May 2010, the township had a total of 292.75 miles (471.14 km) of roadways, of which 242.91 miles (390.93 km) were maintained by the municipality, 26.25 miles (42.25 km) by Monmouth County and 23.59 miles (37.96 km) by the New Jersey Department of Transportation.

Several major highways traverse through Howell Township. These include Interstate 195, U.S. Route 9, Route 33 and Route 34. Major county routes that traverse through Howell include CR 524, CR 547 and CR 549.

The Garden State Parkway passes through east-neighboring townships and is accessible via the I-195/Route 138 at exit 98 in Wall, County Route 549 at exit 98 in Brick, and Route 33 at exit 100 in Neptune City. The New Jersey Turnpike is accessible via the I-195 further west.

==== Public transportation ====
NJ Transit provides bus transportation to communities along Route 9 from Lakewood Township to Old Bridge Township, with lines servicing Howell including:

- Routes 131, 135, and 139 to the Port Authority Bus Terminal in New York City,
- Route 67 to Newark Liberty International Airport,
- Route 64 and 67 to Jersey City, and
- Route 836 for local service between Freehold and Asbury Park.

Bus service is available from Route 9 to Lower Manhattan's Financial District via the Academy Bus Line. There are two commuter parking lots available exclusively for residents of Howell Township; the Aldrich Park and Ride in the Land o' Pines neighborhood, and the Howell Park & Ride in the Adelphia neighborhood.

NJ Transit's rail operations do not directly service Howell; instead, service via the North Jersey Coast Line service to New York City is available at nearby shore towns such as Spring Lake, Manasquan, Point Pleasant, Belmar, Bradley Beach, and Asbury Park. The Monmouth Ocean Middlesex Line (MOM) is a proposed NJ Transit project which would connect Monmouth, Ocean and Middlesex counties to the rest of the system's rail network, with the township having 1 or 2 stations depending on rail alignment.

==== Air and bicycle transportation ====
Monmouth Executive Airport in neighboring Wall Township supplies short-distance flights to surrounding areas, and is the closest air transportation service to Howell. The nearest major commercial airports are Trenton-Mercer Airport, located 28 miles (45 km) west; and Newark Liberty International Airport, which serves as a major hub for United Airlines and located 40 miles (64 km) north (about 56 minutes drive) from the center of Howell Township.

Cycleways, including the Edgar Felix Bikeway, connect to Manasquan and the Jersey Shore, as well as other points of interest.

=== Healthcare ===
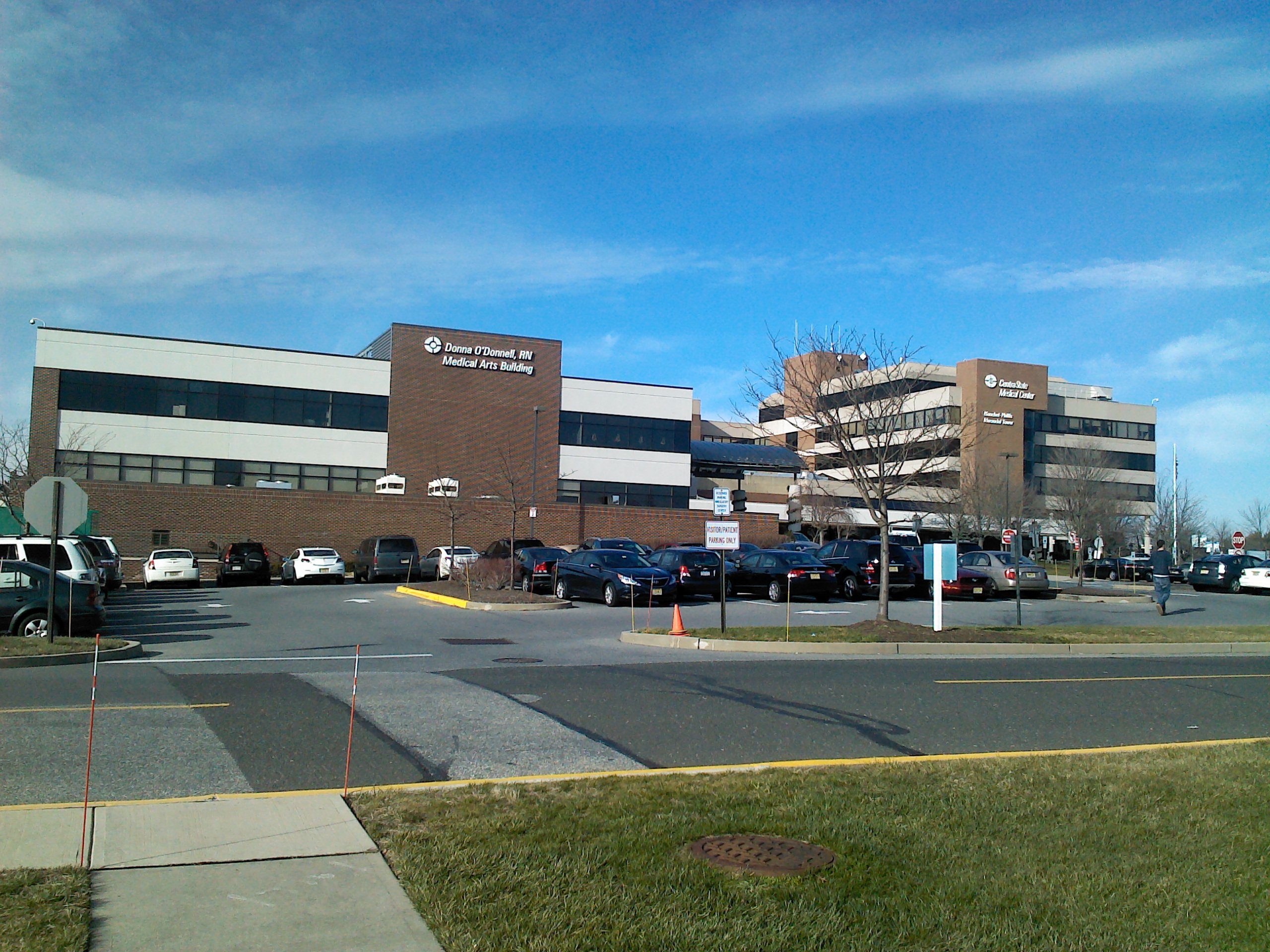
CentraState Medical Center

Howell Township is primarily served by the CentraState Medical Center, a 284-bed hospital campus located in neighboring Freehold Township. The CentraState hospital is a partner of Atlantic Health System, and is affiliated with Rutgers University’s Robert Wood Johnson Medical School; it services the Central Jersey region. The healthcare network offers additional services through its various family practices. Family practices accessible to Howell include locations in Jackson and Colts Neck townships.

The next closest major hospitals to the township are the Monmouth Medical Center Southern Campus in neighboring Lakewood, Jersey Shore University Medical Center in Neptune, the Hamilton division of Robert Wood Johnson University Hospital, and Ocean University Medical Center in Brick.

== Notable people ==
People who were born in, residents of, or otherwise closely associated with Howell Township include:

- Jay Alders (born 1973), artist, photographer and graphic designer, who is best known for his original surf art paintings
- Bonnie Bernstein (born 1970), sportscaster for ESPN/ABC Sports
- Jimmy Blewett (born 1980), professional driver in the NASCAR Whelen Modified Tour; brother of John Blewett III
- John Blewett III (1973–2007), driver who competed in the NASCAR Whelen Modified Tour; brother of Jimmy Blewett
- Cody Calafiore (born 1990), actor and model who was the runner-up on Big Brother 16 in 2014
- Paulie Calafiore (born 1988), television personality who has competed on season 18 of Big Brother
- Sopan Deb (born 1988), journalist who works as a culture reporter for The New York Times
- Anthony DeSclafani (born 1990), MLB pitcher for the Cincinnati Reds
- Charles Asa Francis (1855–1934), politician who served in both the New Jersey General Assembly and New Jersey Senate
- Doug French (born 1959), competed in NASCAR and the ARCA Menards Series from 1985 to 2001
- Sandje Ivanchukov (1960–2007), professional soccer player who was drafted out of high school by the Tampa Bay Rowdies
- Rob Kinelski (born 1981), four-time Grammy award-winning sound engineer, most noted for his work with Billie Eilish & former bass player & founding member of indie rock band Union Spirit
- Brian E. Kinsella (born 1983), veteran, entrepreneur and former financial analyst, who is an advocate for military and veteran mental health
- Nick LaBrocca (born 1984), midfielder for Colorado Rapids
- Austin H. Patterson (died 1905), who served on the Howell Township Committee, the Monmouth County Board of Chosen Freeholders and the New Jersey State Assembly
- Tom Pelphrey (born 1982), actor who has appeared in the daytime soap Guiding Light, as Jonathan Randall
- Frankie Perez (born 1989), mixed martial artist specializing in Brazilian jiu-jitsu who has competed in Ultimate Fighting Championship
- Boruch Perlowitz (born 1990/91), movie producer
- Amy Polumbo (born 1984), Miss New Jersey 2007
- Vinnie Roslin (1947–2012), bass guitarist who was an original member of Steel Mill, an early Bruce Springsteen band that included Danny Federici, Vini Lopez and Steve Van Zandt, who would later become members of Springsteen's E Street Band
- Rich Skrosky (born 1964), football coach
- Ryan Spadola (born 1991), wide receiver who has played with the New York Jets and Miami Dolphins
- Jamie Tomaino (born 1956), professional stock car racing driver
- Denny Walling (born 1954), former Major League Baseball player
