= West Farms =

West Farm(s) may refer to:

- West Farms, New Jersey, an unincorporated community
- West Farms, Bronx, New York City, a neighborhood
  - West Farms Square – East Tremont Avenue (IRT White Plains Road Line)
- Golden West Farms, a horse racing stable in Canada
- West Farms (Litchfield), historic area in Connecticut
