= Freewood Acres, New Jersey =

Populated place in Monmouth County, New Jersey, US

- Unincorporated community
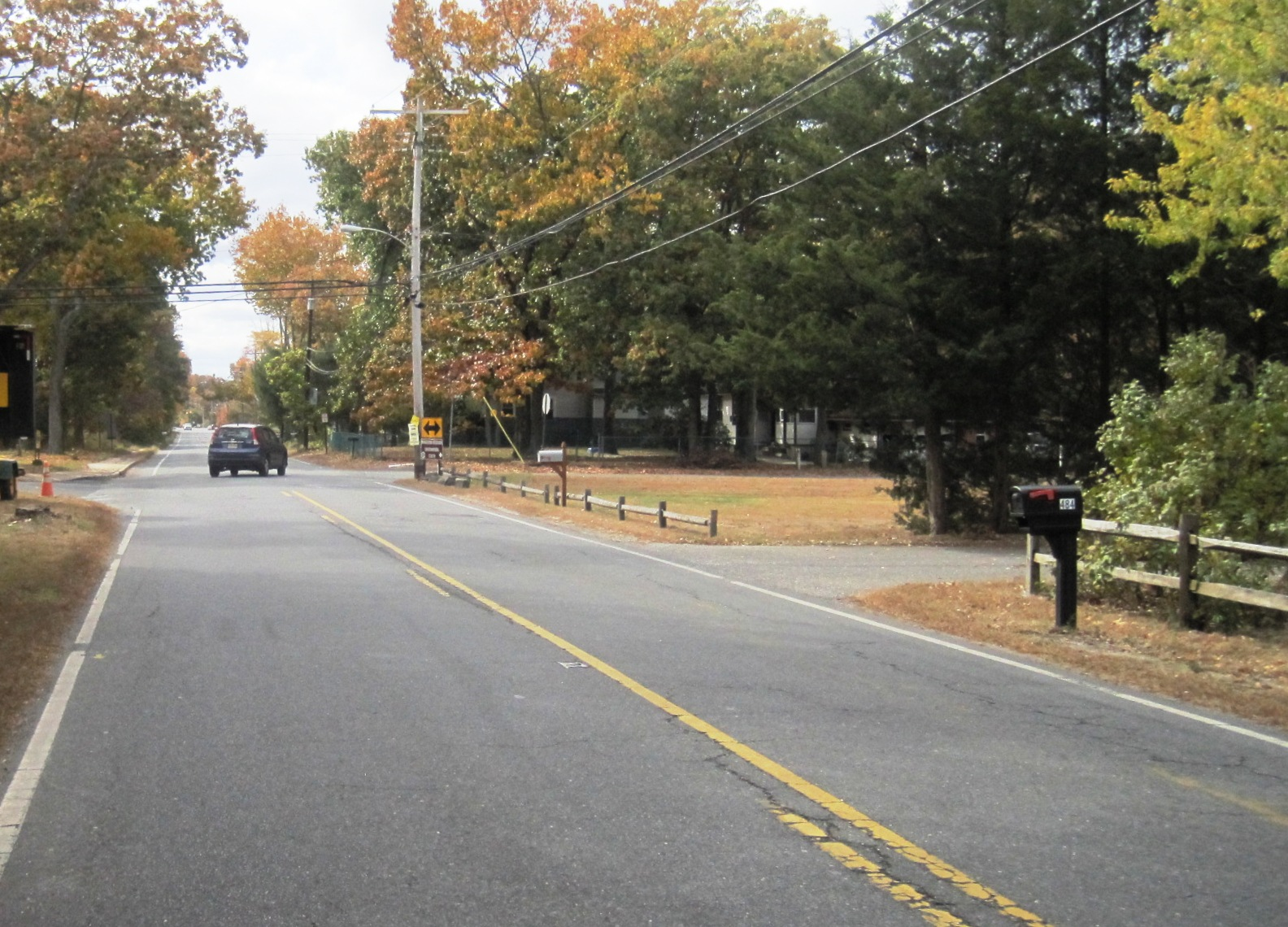
- Along Georgia Tavern Road

- Location in Monmouth County. Inset: Location of county within the state of New Jersey Freewood Acres (New Jersey) Freewood Acres (the United States)
- Coordinates: 40°10′08″N 74°14′17″W
- Country: United States
- State: New Jersey
- County: Monmouth
- Township: Howell
- Elevation: 112 ft (34 m)
- GNIS feature ID: 876506

Freewood Acres is an unincorporated community located within Howell Township in Monmouth County, in the U.S. state of New Jersey. The area is composed primarily of single-story homes arranged along a street grid in the northern reaches of the Pine Barrens. U.S. Route 9 runs through the center of the community just north of its interchange with Interstate 195. The Land O'Pines Elementary School and Manasquan Reservoir County Park are located to the east of the community.

== History ==
In the aftermath of World War II, Freewood Acres became a significant center for the Kalmyk American community. Kalmyks, a Mongolic ethnic group from the Kalmyk Republic in Russia, fled Soviet persecution and resettled in parts of the United States. Many settled in Freewood Acres and Howell Township, establishing a vibrant cultural and religious community.

One of the most notable figures was Ngawang Wangyal, a Tibetan Buddhist monk who in 1958 founded Labsum Shedrub Ling, the first Tibetan Buddhist dharma center in the United States, located in Freewood Acres.

== Community and Culture ==
The Kalmyk diaspora in Freewood Acres continues to maintain its heritage through community events and institutions. The Tashi Lhunpo Monastery, established in Howell, serves as a spiritual hub for the Kalmyk Buddhist community and hosts traditional festivals such as Zul (Kalmyk New Year).

== Infrastructure and Amenities ==
In the early 2010s, Freewood Acres underwent major sewer infrastructure improvements to replace failing septic systems. The $15 million project, led by Howell Township, aimed to improve public health and environmental conditions in the community.

The township also operates Freewood Acres Park, featuring a basketball court, playground, and open space for public use.

== Notable people ==
- Geshe Ngawang Wangyal – Buddhist monk, scholar, and pioneer of Tibetan Buddhism in the United States.
