= Maxim, New Jersey =

Populated place in Monmouth County, New Jersey, US

- Unincorporated community
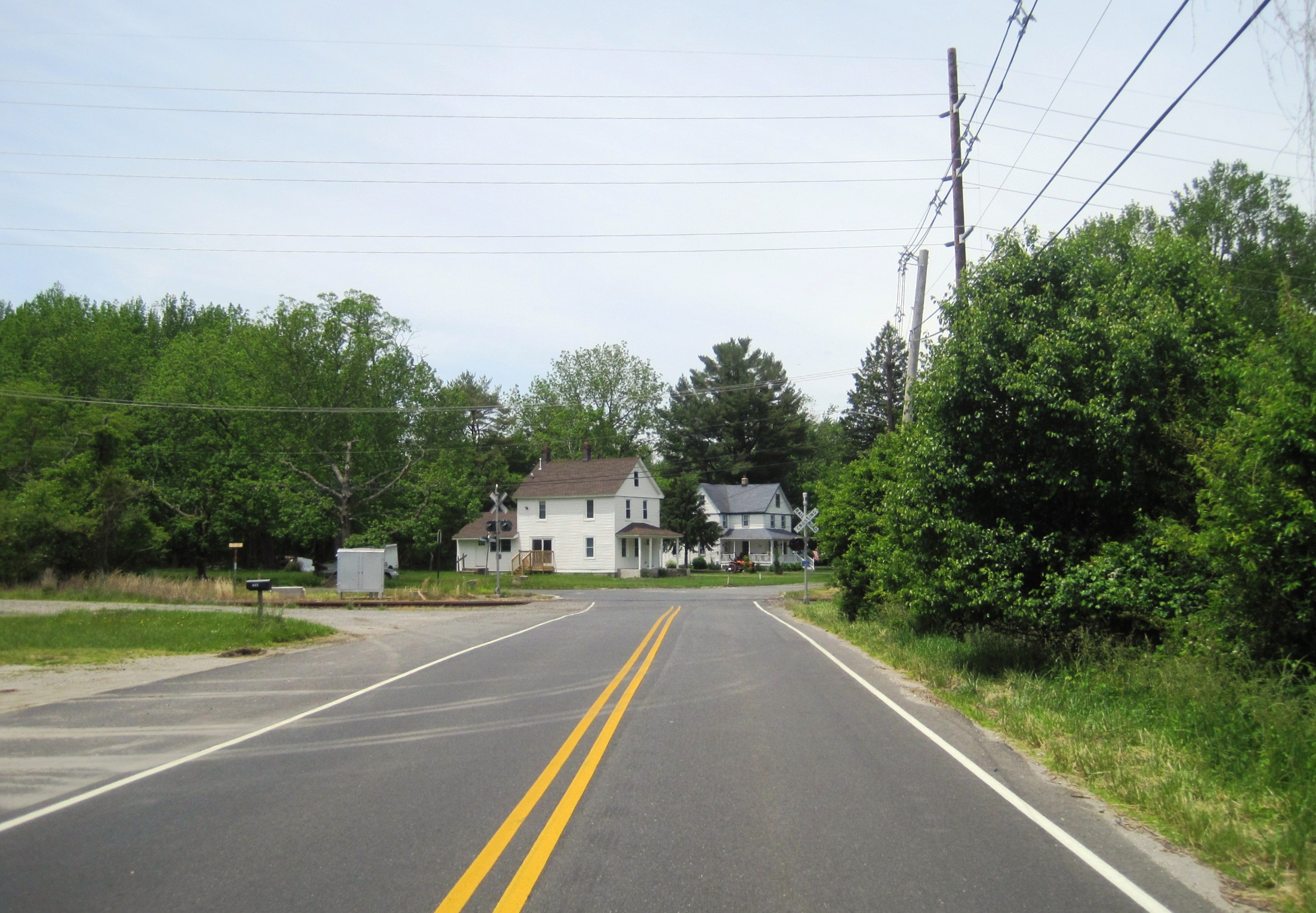

- Location in Monmouth County. Inset: Location of county within the state of New Jersey Maxim (New Jersey) Maxim (the United States)
- Coordinates: 40°09′10″N 74°10′54″W
- Country: United States
- State: New Jersey
- County: Monmouth
- Township: Howell
- Elevation: 75 ft (23 m)
- GNIS feature ID: 878202

Maxim is an unincorporated community located within Howell Township in Monmouth County, in the U.S. state of New Jersey. The area, just southwest of the Squankum takes its name from the Maxim Powder Company and its founder, Hudson Maxim, who developed a plant there in 1890.
