= Bergerville, New Jersey =

Populated place in Monmouth County, New Jersey, US

- Unincorporated community
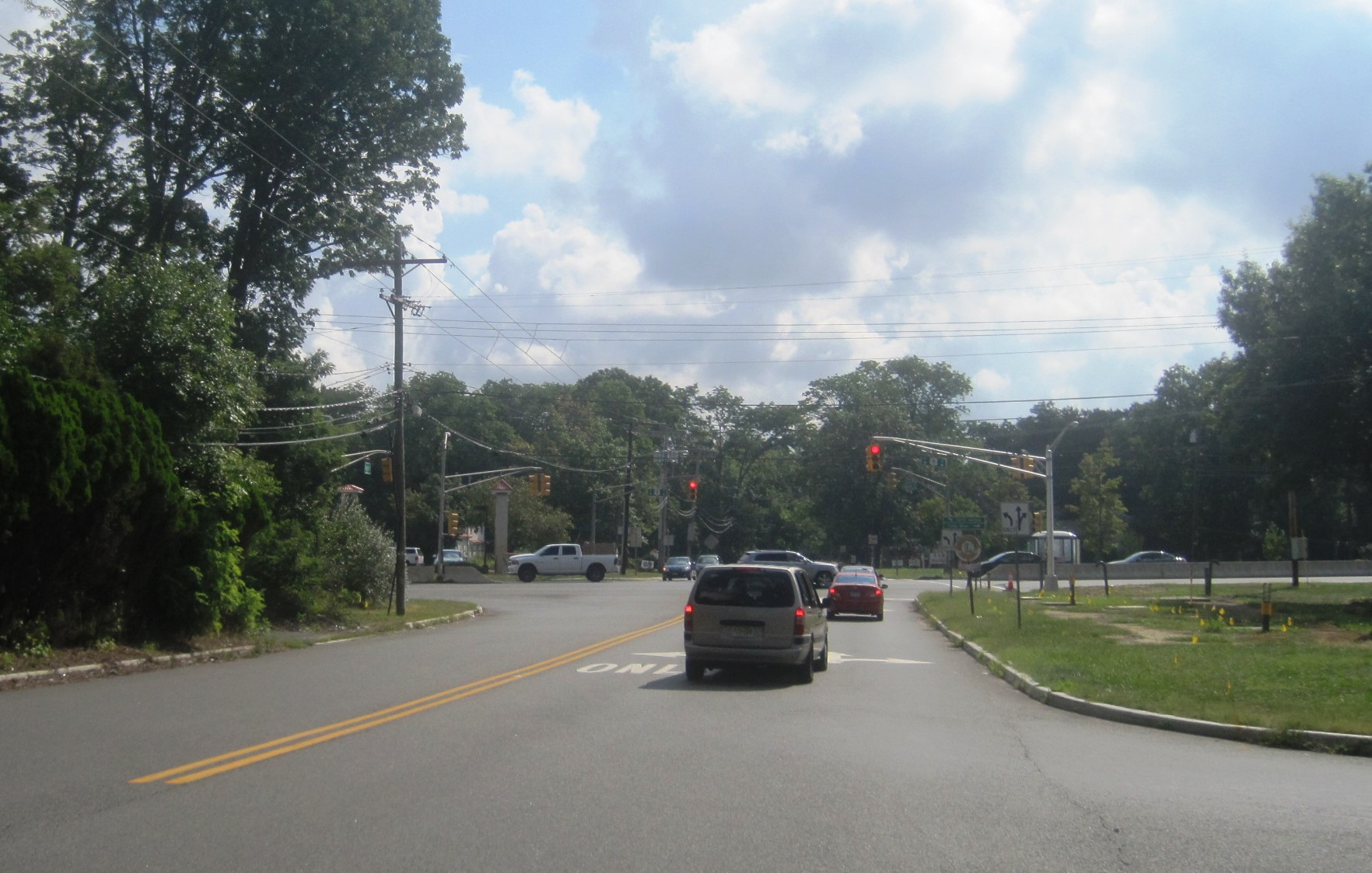
- Looking east along Bergerville Road towards US 9

- Location of Bergerville in Monmouth County Inset: Location of county within the state of New Jersey Bergerville (New Jersey) Bergerville (the United States)
- Coordinates: 40°12′07″N 74°15′42″W
- Country: United States
- State: New Jersey
- County: Monmouth
- Township: Howell
- Elevation: 89 ft (27 m)
- GNIS feature ID: 883199

Bergerville is an unincorporated community located within Howell Township in Monmouth County, in the U.S. state of New Jersey. The area was originally developed as a resort bungalow community in the first half of the 20th century.

The settlement is centered on the intersection of U.S. Route 9 (which runs north and south), Bergerville Road (which runs west towards Freehold Township) and Casino Drive (which runs east towards the Manasquan Reservoir). Commercial businesses line US 9 through the area and some single-family houses are located along the two main east–west roads and Fort Plains Road. Numerous condominium and town house developments are also located nearby.
