= Ardena, New Jersey =

Populated place in Monmouth County, New Jersey, US

- Unincorporated community
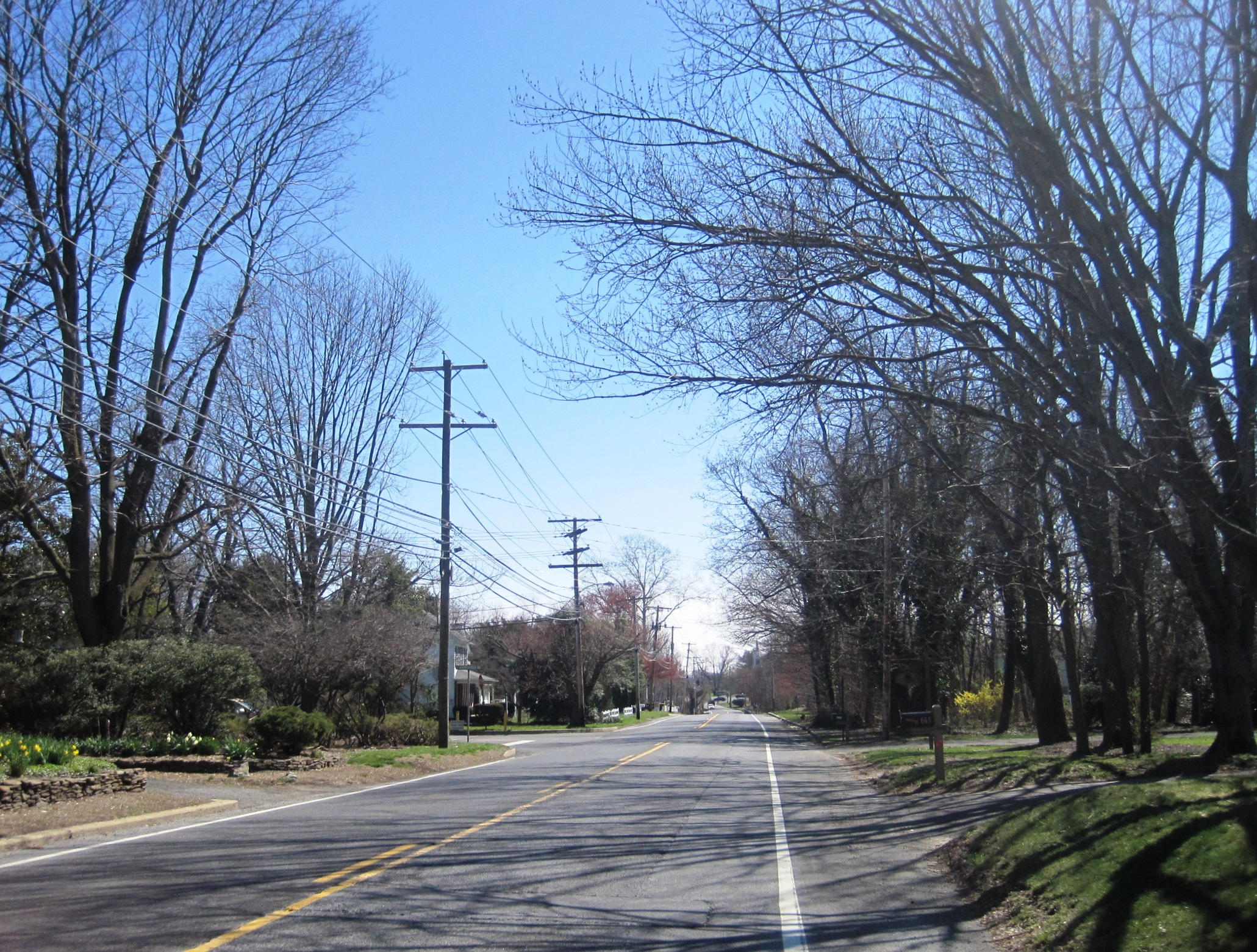
- The intersection of CR 524 and Vanderveer Road in Ardena

- Location in Monmouth County Location in New Jersey Location in the United States
- Coordinates: 40°12′41″N 74°13′58″W
- Country: United States
- State: New Jersey
- County: Monmouth
- Township: Howell
- Elevation: 98 ft (30 m)
- GNIS feature ID: 874371

Ardena is an unincorporated community located within Howell Township in Monmouth County, in the U.S. state of New Jersey. The community is located along County Route 524 near Vanderveer Road in the western part of the township. The area consists of about half farmland and half residential developments.
