= Anne C. Klein =

American Buddhist writer

Anne Carolyn Klein (Lama Rigzin Drolma) is an American Tibetologist who is a professor of Religious Studies at Rice University in Houston, Texas and co-founding director and resident teacher at Dawn Mountain, a Tibetan temple, community center and research institute.

She specializes in Buddhist thought and practice, Tibetan philosophical texts, Tibetan language, Contemplative Studies and Women's studies, with an emphasis in traditions associated with the Heart Essence Vast Expanse. Her books explore the nature of perception, consciousness and mystic experience as understood from a variety of Indian and Tibetan Buddhist traditions. Her most recent book (2015), Strand of Jewels: My Teachers' Essential Guidance on Dzogchen is a translation of the Dzogchen text by Khetsun Sangpo Rinpoche.

== Buddhism teaching ==
Klein has been a practicing Buddhist and student of Buddhist thought since 1971, when she studied with Kensur Ngawang Lekden, the last Abbot of the Tantric College of Lower Lhasa. She then met Geshe Wangyal in New Jersey in 1971, and began studying and practicing under Khetsun Sangpo Rinpoche of Kathmandu in 1973, and receiving teaching authorization from him in 1995, and the title of Dorje Lopon (Lama) from her teacher in Tibet, in 2010. She has studied extensively with a number of Geluk and Dzogchen teachers in India, Nepal and the United States, including Lama Gonpo Tseten.

Dawn Mountain Tibetan Temple, co-founded in Houston with Dr. Harvey Aronson, offers a blend of traditional Tibetan Buddhist learning and practice, as well as supportive practices and cross-cultural reflection. It thus seeks to be a bridge for modern Western students seeking to understand and genuinely engage in Buddhist teachings. Klein is a contributor to Tricycle: The Buddhist Review.

In her dharma teaching, Klein emphasizes the need for embodiment in meditation practice and for an awareness that encompasses cultural as well as personal insights. Since 1998 she has been developing and leading Buddhism in the Body workshops with Phyllis Pay. These have been offered in Berkeley, Houston, Esalen Institute, and Arizona.

== Education, honors, and boards ==
After graduating from Harpur College (now Binghamton University) cum laude with Highest Honors in English, Anne Klein earned her M.A. in Buddhist Studies from the University of Wisconsin–Madison and her PhD in Religious/Tibetan Studies from the University of Virginia. Following this she was awarded a Teaching and Research postdoctoral position at Harvard Divinity School as a Research Associate in Women's Studies and the History of Religion. It was here that she began work on what became her book Meeting the Great Bliss Queen, putting the significance and symbolism of Yeshe Tsogyal, a female Buddha renowned throughout Tibet, in conversation with contemporary western and feminist concerns.

Anne Klein has received National Endowment for the Humanities translation grants and an American Council of Learned Societies Contemplative Studies grant. She is currently a recipient of a Ford Foundation grant under the rubric of Buddhism, Self and Gender: Traditional Buddhism and Modern Western Culture, A Living Dialogue.

She was for over twenty years a member of the board of directors of Ligmincha Institute, an international community for the study and preservation of Bon founded by Geshe Tenzin Wangyal Rinpoche. She is also on the Board of Asia Society, Houston, and has several times been Faculty at the Mind and Life Summer Research Institute in Garrison, New York.

== Bibliography ==
=== Books ===
- Knowledge and Liberation: Tibetan Buddhist Epistemology in Support of Transformative Religious Experience. Snow Lion Publications. 1987.
- Knowing, Naming, and Negation: A Sourcebook on Tibetan Sautrantika. Snow Lion Publications. 1991.
- Path to the Middle: Oral Madhyamaka Philosophy in Tibet: The Spoken Scholarship of Kensur Yeshey Tupden. State University of New York Press. 1994.
- Meeting the Great Bliss Queen: Buddhists, Feminists, and the Art of the Self. Beacon Press. 1996.
- Unbounded Wholeness: Dzogchen, Bon and the Logic of the Nonconceptual. Oxford University Press. 2006.
- Heart Essence, The Vast Expanse: A Story of Transmission. Snow Lion Publications. 2010.
- Strand of Jewels: My Teachers'Essential Guidance on Dzogchen. Snow Lion Publications. 2015.

=== Articles ===
- Klein, Anne (2000). Y. Nagano; S. Karmay (eds.). "Authenticity, Effortlessness: Delusion and Spontaneity in The Authenticity of Open Awareness and Related Texts". New Horizons in Bon Studies. Osaka, Japan: Ethnographic Museum. pp. 193–223.
- Klein, Anne (2000). White, David (ed.). "Assorted Topics of the Great Completeness". Tantra in Practice. Princeton University Press. pp. 557–572.
- Klein, Anne (2001). "Bon Dzogchen on Authenticity: Prose. Poetry and the Path". Changing Minds: Contributions to the Study of Buddhism and Tibet in Honor of Jeffrey Hopkins. Ithaca: Snow Lion Press. pp. 133–153.
- Klein, Anne (2002). "On Love and Work: A Vow of Wholeness, in Writing". Hypatia: A Journal of Women and Philosophy: Special Issue on Love and Work. Vol. 17, no. 2.
- Klein, Anne (2002). Blezer, Henk (ed.). "Unbounded Functionality: A Modest rDzogs-chen Rejection of the Classic 'don byed nus pa Criterion" in Religion and Culture". Tibet: Tibetan Studies II. Proceedings of the International Association of Tibetan Studies in Leiden. pp. 345–364.
- Klein, Anne (2003). Taliaferro, Charles; Griffiths, Paul J. (eds.). "Finding a Self: Buddhist and Feminist Perspectives". Philosophy of Religion: An Anthology. Blackwell Philosophy Anthologies. Blackwell Publishing. pp. 329–344.
- Klein, Anne (2003). "Orality in Tibet". Oral Tradition. Vol. 18, no. 1.
- Klein, Anne (2004). "Womb of the Sky Woman: Symbols and Significance of the Dakini in Tibet". Chakra-tidskrift för indiska religioner [Chakra: Journal for Indian religions]. Vol. 1, no. 1.
- Klein, Anne (2005). Huff, Margaret C.; Wetherill, Ann K. (eds.). "He, She, God, and Me". Religion: A Search for Meaning. McGraw-Hill Companies, Inc.
- Klein, Anne (2014). "The Four Immeasurables". Tricycle: The Buddhist Review. Vol. XXIV, no. 1.
- Klein, Anne (2016). "Revisiting Ritual". Tricycle: The Buddhist Review. Vol. XXVI, no. 1.
