= Ngawang Wangyal =

Tibetan-American Kalmyk Buddhist lama (1901–1983)

Geshe Ngawang Wangyal
- ངག་དབང་དབང་རྒྱལ་
- Pronunciation: Ngag-dbang Dbang-rgyal
- Born: Lidjin Keerab; 15 October 1901; Astrakhan province, Russia
- Died: 30 January 1983 (aged 81); West Palm Beach, Florida
- Occupations: lama, scholar, author, translator

Ngawang Wangyal (Tibetan: ངག་དབང་དབང་རྒྱལ་, Wylie: Ngag-dbang Dbang-rgyal), aka Sogpo (Mongolian) Wangyal, popularly known as Geshe Wangyal and "America's first lama," born Lidjin Keerab (Лиҗин Кеераб, spelled Лижиин Кээраб in early Russian transcriptions of Kalmyk, 15 October 1901 – 30 January 1983) was a Buddhist lama and scholar of Kalmyk origin. He was born in the Astrakhan province in southeast Russia sometime in 1901 and died in West Palm Beach, Florida in 1983. He came to the United States from Tibet in 1955 and was the spiritual leader of the Kalmuk Buddhist community in Freewood Acres, New Jersey (near Freehold) at the Rashi Gempil-Ling Buddhist Temple. He is considered a "founding figure" of Buddhism in the West.

He developed the code for the CIA that aided the Dalai Lama's escape from Tibet, spearheaded a two decade long undertaking to lift political proscriptions on US visits by the 14th Dalai Lama, opened the first Tibetan Buddhist Dharma center in the West, and trained the first generation of Tibetan Buddhist scholars in America. He taught at Columbia University and sponsored visits by monks and lamas from the Tibetan emigre settlement in India, instructing them in English so they could serve the Buddhist community in the United States.

In 1971 Geshe Wangyal and the Dalai Lama persuaded Robert Thurman to start publishing an English translation of the entire 4000 titles of the Tengyur, "the Tibetan canon of scientific treatises (śāstra), which constitutes Indo-Tibetan civilization's contribution to the contemporary arts and sciences." In 1972, the American Institute of Buddhist Studies was founded at Columbia University as suggested by the Dalai Lama and Geshe Wangyal. The published translations, Treasury of Buddhist Sciences: The Translated Scriptures & Treatises, are the founding series of The American Institute of Buddhist Studies at Columbia University.

Wangyal translated two volumes of popular Tibetan and Sanskrit stories illustrative of Buddhist teachings, The Door of Liberation and The Prince Who Became a Cuckoo. With Brian Cutillo, he also translated the "Illuminations of Sakya-Pandita."

The Dalai Lama thanked

"Sogpo (Mongolian) Wangyal, the late Geshe Wangyal, for contributing to and advocating Tibetan Buddhism among Americans"

in a message of congratulations and thanks to those who started Tibet House in New York, in a video opening 2021's 34th annual Tibet House US benefit.

Geshe Wangyal, With Blessing of the Three Jewels, a biographical documentary by Kalmyk director Ella Manzheeva, an official selection of the International Buddhist Film Festival in 2023, premiered at the Asian World Film Festival (AWFF) in Los Angeles in 2022. Originally conceived as a feature film, Manzheeva filmed it as research for a feature length script on Geshe Wangyal's life. She "deliberately made this film as an offering" and considers Geshe Wangyal "the greatest Kalmyk of the last 2,000 years."

== Early years ==
Geshe Wangyal, the youngest of four children, chose to enter the monastery as a novice monk at age six. After the Russian Civil War, Geshe Wangyal went to Lhasa, Tibet, where he studied at the Gomang College of Drepung Monastic University in Lhasa until 1935 when he decided to return to his homeland to obtain financial support to complete his studies. Geshe Wangyal was a disciple of the eminent Buriat Mongol scholar and diplomat Agvan Dorzhiev

Due to Communist persecution of religious clergy, Geshe Wangyal decided to end his return trip home. Instead, he found a job in Peking, China, comparing different editions of the Tibetan collections of Buddha's word (Kangyur) and of the treatises of Indian commentators (Tanjur). In 1937, Geshe Wangyal left Peking to return to Tibet via India after earning enough money to support himself until he received his geshe degree from Drepung.

While in Calcutta, Geshe Wangyal was hired as a translator to Sir Charles Bell, a well-known British statesman, scholar and explorer, and accompanied him on a trip through China and Manchuria before returning to Tibet. Afterwards, he received his geshe degree in Lhasa and used his remaining earnings and many newly established contacts to raise funds for the purpose of assisting poor scholars to obtain their geshe degree, especially Mongolians in India, who, like him, were cut off from support from a Communist home country.

When the Communist Chinese invaded Tibet in the early 1950s, Geshe Wangyal escaped to India. Then in 1955, he was sent to the United States by the Dalai Lama to work as a lama among the Kalmyk Americans who were newly resettled in New Jersey, New York and Pennsylvania as refugees from Central Europe.

== Buddhist monastery's teacher ==
In 1958, Geshe Wangyal established and built the first Tibetan Buddhist dharma center in the West, Labsum Shedrub Ling, the Lamaist Buddhist Monastery of America, in Freewood Acres, New Jersey, later moved to Washington NJ and renamed the Tibetan Buddhist Learning Center, in Washington, New Jersey. Geshe Wangyal, leader of New Jersey's 400‐member Kalmuk Mongolian community, was in charge of the arrangements for the Dalai Lama's visit to the state in September 1979. In 1971, he had a room built and reserved for the Dalai Lama at Labsum Shedrub Ling, and it was in that room that the Dalai Lama stayed after greeting his followers. He served as the monastery's head teacher until his death in January, 1983. He taught many students of Western background and contributed greatly to the spread of Tibetan Buddhism in the United States. He brought Geshe Lhundup Sopa to the monastery, where he stayed for several years before accepting a position at the Buddhist Studies program of the University of Wisconsin-Madison, where he became the first traditional Tibetan Buddhist scholar to become a tenured professor at an American university.

Among his students were translators, scholars, authors, artists, doctors and teachers, including Dr. Robert Thurman, Professor of Indo-Tibetan Buddhist Studies at Columbia University and president of Tibet House US, who was introduced to the Dalai Lama by Geshe Wangyal, Thurman's first guru; Dr. Jeffrey Hopkins, Professor Emeritus University of Virginia; Anne C. Klein, Professor and former Chair of the Department of Religion, Rice University, and co-founder of the Dawn Mountain Center for Tibetan Buddhism; Dr. Alexander Berzin, founder of the Berzin Archives - Study Buddhism; scholar Joshua Cutler and Diana Cutler, Directors of the Tibetan Buddhist Learning Center; painter, teacher and author Ted Seth Jacobs; scholars Dr. Leonard Zwilling, Robert Clark, and Dr. Michael Sweet; composer and musician Philip Glass; and Dr. Daniel P. Brown, Ph.D, Professor of Harvard Medical School and author. According to Dr. Berzin,

"Back in the 1960s, in the United States, there were very few opportunities to get to know Buddhism. There were a few books that were written, but they were more sensationalist and they did not really convey the authentic tradition. There were a few professors at universities who were teaching about Buddhism, but the approach at that time was that Buddhism, particularly Tibetan Buddhism, was a dead subject, and so it was taught like Ancient Egyptian studies. And so the professors had their original texts in the original languages and they taught language, primarily. It was almost like a grand puzzle that everybody was trying to figure out. What could this possibly mean? And in this atmosphere, Geshe Wangyal was a unique light, because he provided access to a living tradition. And a few of us had the great fortune to meet with him. A few of us actually lived with him and studied with him, like my colleagues Robert Thurman and Jeffrey Hopkins."

== Selected bibliography ==
- The Door of Liberation: Essential Teachings of the Tibetan Buddhist Tradition, Wisdom Publications, January 1, 2002 ISBN 9780861710324
- The Jewelled Staircase, Snow Lion, January 1, 1990, ISBN 9780937938386
- The Prince Who Became a Cuckoo: A Tale of liberation (The Bhaisajaguru series), Lama Lo-dro of Drepung, author; Lama Geshe Wangyal, translator; Theatre Arts Books; January 1, 1982, ISBN 978-0878305742
- Illuminations of Sakya-Pandita: A Guide to Essential Buddhist Practices, Geshe Wangyal, translator with Brian Cutillo, Wisdom Publications; May 1, 1988, ISBN 978-0932156051
