= Mackenzie Museum and Library =

Historic home and Civil War museum in Howell Township, New Jersey

General information
- Architectural style: Georgian
- Location: Howell Township, New Jersey, United States
- Coordinates: 40°09′37″N 74°09′20″W
- Year(s) built: mid-19th century

The Mackenzie Museum and Library is a historic home and museum located in Howell Township, New Jersey. The property is notable for its connection to Captain William Prickitt (1839–1929), an officer in the Union Army during the American Civil War who commanded Company G of the 25th United States Colored Infantry Regiment, part of the United States Colored Troops (USCT).

== History ==
The house served as the longtime residence of Captain Prickitt, who played a critical role in leading Black Union soldiers during the Civil War. According to the Library of Congress, the 25th USCT was organized at Camp William Penn in La Mott, Pennsylvania in 1864 and deployed to defend strategic positions in the Gulf Coast, including Fort Barrancas and Fort Pickens in Pensacola, Florida. Though the regiment saw no combat, it endured high casualties due to disease—particularly scurvy—in 1865, which claimed the lives of approximately 150 men.

The 25th USCT was composed of both formerly enslaved and free African American men. In some cases, enslaved men were enlisted by their owners in exchange for a $300 bounty payment. Prickitt's Company G was among the units that included such soldiers.

== Photographic archive ==
One of the most important contributions from Prickitt's legacy is a photo album of Black Civil War soldiers, donated by his descendants to the National Museum of African American History and Culture. The leather-bound, two-inch-thick album includes dozens of named tintype photographs of Black soldiers—many among the earliest identified images of African American troops in uniform.

== Preservation ==
Known locally as the "MacKenzie House" after its last private resident, the building functioned for many years as a local museum and library for school groups and history enthusiasts. However, due to structural issues—most notably a deteriorating chimney—the building was closed in the early 2020s.

Efforts to restore the house have been supported by the Howell Historical Society and various preservationists, citing its unique connection to Black Civil War history and the rare photographic archive tied to Prickitt’s military service.

== See also ==
- United States Colored Troops
- Camp William Penn
- National Museum of African American History and Culture
