= West Farms, New Jersey =

Populated place in Monmouth County, New Jersey, US

- Unincorporated community
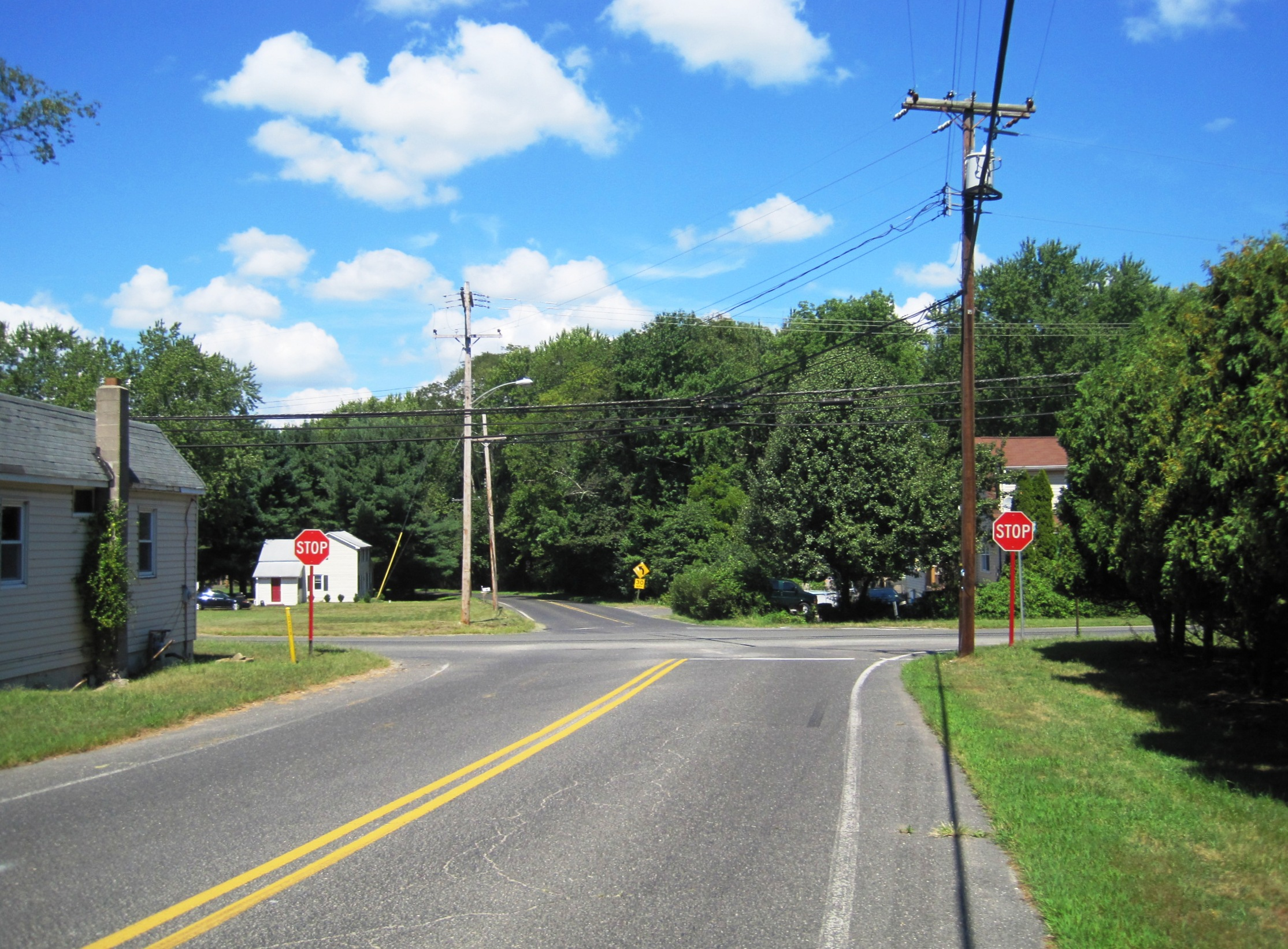
- Intersection of Casino Drive and West Farms Road

- Location of West Farms in Monmouth County Inset: Location of county within the state of New Jersey West Farms (New Jersey) West Farms (the United States)
- Coordinates: 40°11′31″N 74°12′05″W
- Country: United States
- State: New Jersey
- County: Monmouth
- Township: Howell
- Elevation: 79 ft (24 m)
- Time zone: UTC−05:00 (Eastern (EST))
  - Summer (DST): UTC−04:00 (EDT)
- GNIS feature ID: 881701

West Farms is an unincorporated community located within Howell Township in Monmouth County, in the U.S. state of New Jersey. The settlement is centered on the intersection of West Farms Road and Casino Drive, located to the west of Farmingdale and to the north of the Manasquan Reservoir. It was once home Jewish farmers who settled there in the early 20th century. The rural area is mostly made up of wooded areas with some houses and churches dotted along the two aforementioned roads. Numerous small farms are also located throughout the area.
