= Howell Township Public Schools =

School district in Monmouth County, New Jersey, US

Address
- 200 Squankum-Yellowbrook Road Howell Township, Monmouth County, New Jersey, 07731; United States
- Coordinates: 40.174463°N 74.164721°W

District information
- Grades: PreK-8
- Superintendent: Joseph Isola
- Business administrator: Ronald Sanasac
- Schools: 12

Students and staff
- Enrollment: 5,409 (as of 2020–21)
- Faculty: 494.5 FTEs
- Student–teacher ratio: 10.9:1

Other information
- District Factor Group: FG
- Website: www.howell.k12.nj.us
Ind.	Per pupil	District spending	Rank (*)	K-8 average	%± vs. average
1A	Total Spending	$18,743	68	$18,891	−0.8%
1	Budgetary Cost	14,373	45	14,159	1.5%
2	Classroom Instruction	8,520	42	8,659	−1.6%
6	Support Services	2,359	56	2,167	8.9%
8	Administrative Cost	1,391	24	1,547	−10.1%
10	Operations & Maintenance	1,852	69	1,612	14.9%
13	Extracurricular Activities	76	30	104	−26.9%
16	Median Teacher Salary	61,000	41	61,136
Data from NJDoE 2014 Taxpayers' Guide to Education Spending. *Of K-8 districts with more than 750 students. Lowest spending=1; Highest=84

The Howell Township Public Schools is a community public school district that serves students in pre-kindergarten through eighth grade from Howell Township, in Monmouth County, in the U.S. state of New Jersey.

As of the 2020–21 school year, the district, comprising 12 schools, had an enrollment of 5,409 students and 494.5 classroom teachers (on an FTE basis), for a student–teacher ratio of 10.9:1.

The district is classified by the New Jersey Department of Education as being in District Factor Group "FG", the fourth-highest of eight groupings. District Factor Groups organize districts statewide to allow comparison by common socioeconomic characteristics of the local districts. From lowest socioeconomic status to highest, the categories are A, B, CD, DE, FG, GH, I and J.

Students in public school for ninth through twelfth grades attend either Howell High School, Freehold Township High School or Colts Neck High School (depending on home address), as part of the Freehold Regional High School District. The Freehold Regional High School District also serves students from Colts Neck Township, Englishtown, Farmingdale, Freehold Borough, Freehold Township, Manalapan Township and Marlboro.

== Schools ==
Schools in the district (with 2020–21 enrollment data from the National Center for Education Statistics) are five K-2 elementary schools, five 3-5 elementary schools and two middle schools for grades 6-8.

Elementary schools

- Adelphia Elementary School (345 students; in grades K-2)
  - Danielle Palazzolo, principal
- Aldrich Elementary School (378; 3-5)
  - Drew Smith, principal
- Ardena Elementary School (324; 3-5)
  - Kathleen Mignoli, principal
- Greenville Elementary School (318; K-2)
  - Lynn Coco, principal
- Griebling Elementary School (255; K-2)
  - Betty Ferrigno, principal
- Land O' Pines Elementary School (486; PreK-2)
  - Dheranie Suarez, principal
- Memorial Elementary Elementary School (258; 3-5)
  - Raymond Gredder, principal
- Newbury Elementary School (372; 3-5)
  - Jim Quinn, principal
- Ramtown Elementary School (325; 3-5)
  - AJ Bohrer, principal
- Taunton Elementary School (362; K-2)
  - Brooke Napoli, principal

Middle schools

- Howell Township Middle School North (1,116; 6-8)
  - Paul Farley, principal
- Howell Township Middle School South (868; 6-8)
  - Robert Henig, principal

== Administration ==
Core members of the district's administration are:

- Joseph Isola, superintendent
- Ronald Sanasac, business administrator and board secretary

== Board of education ==
The district's board of education, composed of nine members, sets policy and oversees the fiscal and educational operation of the district through its administration. As a Type II school district, the board's trustees are elected directly by voters to serve three-year terms of office on a staggered basis, with three seats up for election each year held (since 2012) as part of the November general election. The board appoints a superintendent to oversee the district's day-to-day operations and a business administrator to supervise the business functions of the district.
