= Kalmyk Americans =

Americans of Kalmyk Mongolian birth or descent

Калмыцкие американцы (Russian)

Total population
- 3,000

Regions with significant populations
- New Jersey, Pennsylvania, and California

Languages
- American English, Kalmyk Oirat, Russian, Kyrgyz

Religion
- Tibetan Buddhism, Tengrism, Russian Orthodox Christianity, Islam

Kalmyk Americans are Americans of Kalmyk Mongolic ancestry.

== History ==
American Kalmyks initially established communities in the United States following a mass immigration after World War II. The largest groups of Kalmyks originally settled primarily in the states of Pennsylvania and New Jersey. The majority of today's Kalmyk American population are descended from those Kalmyk refugees who had fled Russia in late 1920 to places such as France, Yugoslavia, Bulgaria, and, later, Germany.

As a consequence of their decades-long migration through Europe, many original Kalmyk immigrants to America could speak German, French, and Serbo-Croatian, in addition to Russian and their native Kalmyk language.

Many Kalmyks were stranded in German displaced persons camps for a number of years following the end of World War II. They were originally classified as Asian under U.S. immigration law, and therefore denied entry, but in 1951 they were reclassified as Caucasian. In 1955 many immigrated to the United States after the Tolstoy Foundation sponsored their passage.

There are several Kalmyk Buddhist temples in Monmouth County, New Jersey, (notably Freewood Acres, New Jersey) where the vast majority of American Kalmyks reside, Philadelphia, Pennsylvania, as well as a Tibetan Buddhist Learning Center and monastery in Washington Township, New Jersey.

== Notable people ==
- Sandje Ivanchukov
- Erdne Ombadykow
- Tsem Rinpoche
- Sasha Stiles
- Ngawang Wangyal

== See also ==
- Kalmyks
- Kalmykia
- Mongolian Americans
