= Bog Creek Farm Superfund site =

Superfund site in New Jersey, United States

Coordinates: 40.1510°N 74.1601°W

Bog Creek Farm
- Superfund site
- Location: Howell, Monmouth, New Jersey

Information
- Contaminants: VOCs, Heavy metals
- Responsible parties: Western Ranch Corporation

Progress
- Proposed: December 30, 1982
- Listed: September 8, 1983

The Bog Creek Farm Superfund Site is a designated Environmental Protection Agency Superfund site, located in Howell Township, New Jersey.

Between 1973 and 1974, the Western Ranch Corporation used the site as a dumping ground for the byproducts of paint production. Over a decade later, actions began to take place to clean and restore the contaminated environment in the area. Bog Creek Farm was notable for its proximity to various bodies of water, farmlands, and public outdoor spaces such as Allaire State Park.

Following a Hazard Ranking System report, the EPA placed the site on the National Priorities List in September 1983. Cleanup operations concluded in 1991, however remedial groundwater cleaning is ongoing under state operations as of 2021.

== Background ==
=== Town history ===
Howell Township is located in Monmouth County, New Jersey, United States. On February 23, 1801, Howell was included as a township by an act of the New Jersey Legislature, from parts of Shrewsbury Township, before itself being partitioned to create more townships and a borough. Howell borders townships in 2 counties; Wall, Freehold, and Colts Neck in Monmouth County, & Brick, Lakewood, and Jackson in Ocean County. Howell completely surrounds Farmingdale Borough, making Howell a “doughnut town”.

In the 1970 US Census, the most recent census prior to the dumping of chemicals at the site, the township had a population of around 22,000.

=== Company and site history ===
Frederick Barry and his wife Margaret M. Barry (née Mildenberg) were the owners of the Western Ranch Corporation, a paint manufacturing company, through which they would purchase the eventual site in June 1973.

Located in Howell Township, Bog Creek Farm was originally a 12-acre lot, located within a larger 181-acre tract of farmland, on 579 Lakewood-Farmingdale Road, the Howell-specific name for Monmouth County Route 547.

== Dumping and initial local response ==
After the land was purchased by the WRC, trenches and a small pond were dug on a four-acre section of the lot. Beginning sometime after June 1973, it is believed by investigators that WRC utilized the trenches as dumping troughs where sludge and liquid byproducts of paint manufacturing, including resins, solvents, and some general trash were poured in; other byproducts were believed to have been poured into the lake or directly onto the ground within the four-acre section.

Dumping continued until 1974, when neighbors began filing complaints about odors coming from the site, which prompted the Howell Township Health Department (HTHD) to investigate the site. Under pressure from the HTHD, the Barrys began excavating material from some of the dumping trenches, which was transported to the KinBuc Landfill in Edison, New Jersey, before backfilling the trenches with soil at the orders of the HTHD; the Howell government, later accompanied by the New Jersey Department of Environmental Protection, began monitoring the site afterwards.

In 1981, Samuel Khoudary, who was unaware of the site's history, purchased the farm to raise horses; Khoudary subsequently dealt with directives from the NJDEP to pay for the remedial work needed to clean the site.

== Superfund designation ==
After seeing the health impact of those residing in the surrounding areas, State and Federal action was taken nearly a decade after the contamination began. A cleanup effort has taken effect that still remains to date.

=== State intervention ===
The state of New Jersey made the decision to take action in the mid-1980s, more than a decade after the damage began, although Bog Creek Farm was listed as a Superfund site in 1983. The property owners Frederick and Margaret Barry and Samuel Khaudary were directed to remove partial waste and cover the trench. Directions came shortly after on-site toxicity was brought to the attention of the Howell Township Health Department, located in Howell, New Jersey, by the property owners. It then became a national issue when EPA came up with a plan to clean the area with three major aquifers in September 1985.

=== National intervention ===
The control of contamination and its source was elected in September 1985 by EPA's Record of Decision. However, in 1984, EPA installed test pits, trenches, and wells on site to determine the extent of contamination. The site was addressed through the actions of Federal agents. EPA's involvement discovered the disposal area of 4 acres; about a third of the size of the 12-acre area. The site owners pumped the contaminated waste into landfills approved by the EPA.

== Health and environmental hazards ==
Due to the high amount of contamination in the on-site groundwater, surface water, waste, sediment, and soil there are several health and environmental hazards. Infections, reactions, and disorders have been detected in pollution victims via contaminants detected in a laboratory. Groundwater, waste, and surface water contaminants included, but are not limited to benzene, chloroform, ethyl benzene, methylene chloride, dichlorobenzene, dichloromethane, methyl phenol, trichloroethane, toluene, and xylenes. The on-site soil contained chlordane, chromium, lead, and PCB-1242. Sediment was contaminated with benzene, bis phthalate, heptachlor, toluene, and total xylenes. Environmental pathways began to migrate off-site via wind and water, affecting more than on-site life. Due to the unrestricted area the site lies on, hunting may be conducted on Bog Creek Farm. Contaminated food-chain entities that have been hunted have the potential to expose humans to the toxicity of the area.

=== Water contamination ===
Water carried through to Squankum Brook took a toll on the town's residents. In the short term, victims may suffer respiratory tract infection, visual disorders, skin reactions, nausea, and fatigue. However, in the long run, those victims may experience damage to liver, kidneys, and central nervous system.

=== Land contamination ===
Ground water, surface water, waste soil and sediment has the ability to cause harm to those who come in contact with the contaminated element. Such hazardous materials have the potential to be absorbed by the skin, inhaled, or ingested, leading to further health issues.

=== Other contaminants ===
Lacquer thinners, paint solvents, animal carcasses, residential debris, VOC's, heavy metals, resins, and disinfectants evaporated into the air, polluting the air inhaled by not only humans, but animals as well. This has had a huge impact on the 900 people, crops, agriculture and livestock residing within one mile of the Superfund site Bog Creek Farm.

== Cleanup ==
18,000 tons of contaminated soil was removed from the site to date. Removal and treatment of 6.5 million gallons of contaminated groundwater have been conducted just in 2017. Human exposure is kept to a minimum with the best effort of the EPA.

=== Initial cleanup ===
Starting in 1985, cleanup was directed by EPA standards. The removal of wastewater from the bog and pond was the initial step. EPA continued on the restructuring and covering both the pond and bog. Using an on-site plant, clean water was discharged to nearby stream after the wastewater was treated. Several reviews were set up, such as a 5-year and 10-year review, to monitor and assess the effectiveness of the method of clean up. A security fence was placed around the work areas to ensure proper reliability of the controlled cleanup strategy. EPA conducted an investigation to reduce the amount and source of contamination at Bog Creek Farm.

=== Current status ===
Groundwater treatment in Bog Creek Farm is currently ongoing. Groundwater is extracted, treated, and re-injected using an on-site treatment method. This method is used to restore water resources in the Upper Kirkwood Aquifer. Contaminated sediments are also being cleaned up from the North Branch of Squankum Brook via manual digging up and incinerating. Operating continuously, the treatment system for the water at Bog Creek Farm treats nearly one million gallons of contaminated water, then re-injects the clean water, each month.
