= Jerseyville, New Jersey =

Populated place in Monmouth County, New Jersey, US

- Unincorporated community
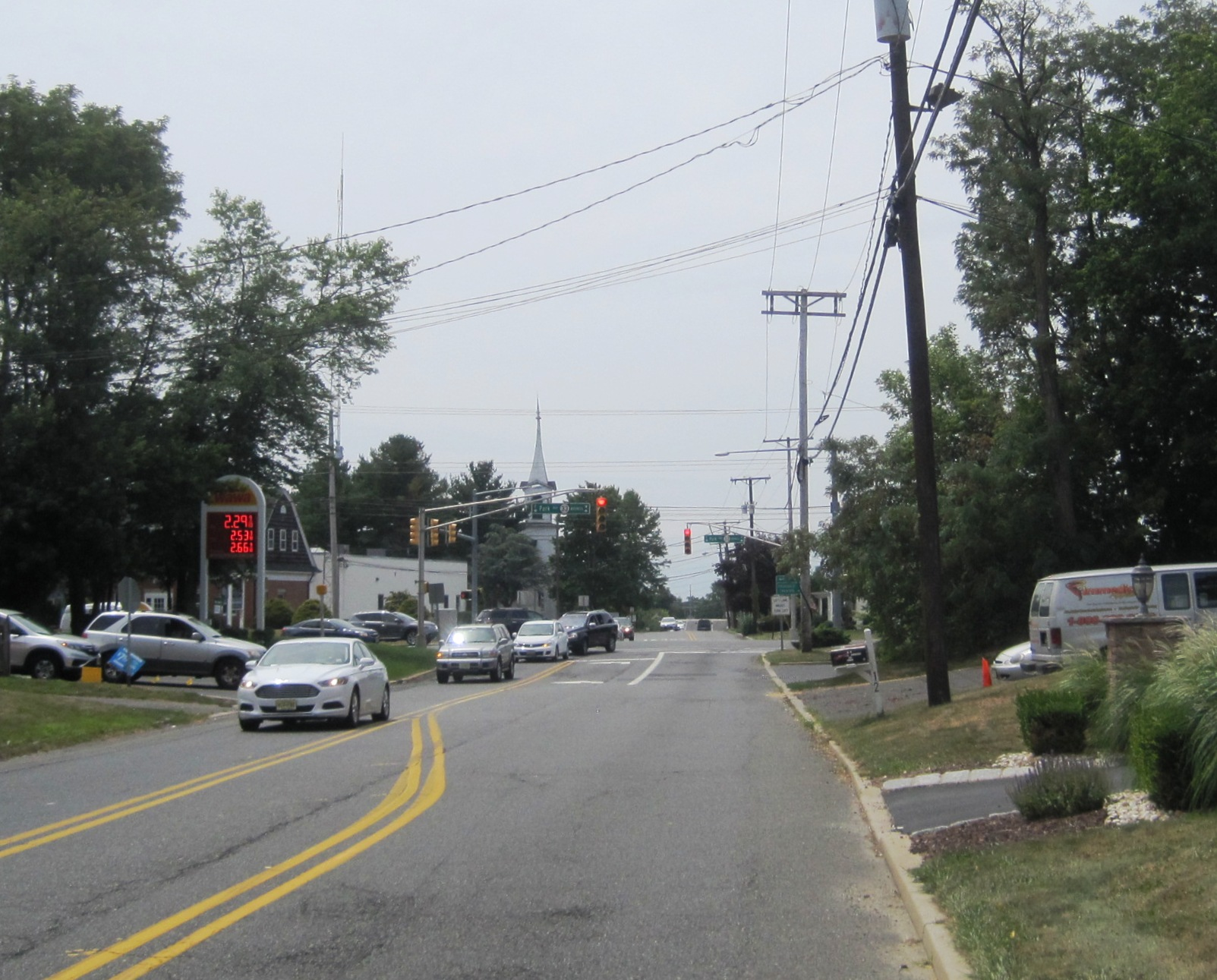
- Southbound on Five Points Road approaching the center of Jerseyville at Route 33 Bus.

- Location in Monmouth County. Inset: Location of county within the state of New Jersey Jerseyville (New Jersey) Jerseyville (the United States)
- Coordinates: 40°14′21″N 74°13′46″W
- Country: United States
- State: New Jersey
- County: Monmouth
- Township: Howell
- Elevation: 154 ft (47 m)
- ZIP Code: 07728
- GNIS feature ID: 877453

Jerseyville is an unincorporated community located within Howell Township in Monmouth County, in the U.S. state of New Jersey. It is primarily a rural area within the northern part of the township, near Colts Neck and Freehold. Route 33 Business travels through Jerseyville, with some development, including a gas station, a convenience store, a church, and several residences.

Originally known as Green Grove, the area's name was changed by residents to Jerseyville in 1854.
