= Kaofin =

Kaofin is the trademarked name of an absorbency product created in 1993 by Marcal Paper Mills, Inc. and banned for use by the New Jersey Department of Environmental Protection in 1997. The product itself is a combination of a wide variety of substances.

== Chemistry ==
Kaofin is a mixture of kaolin clay and cellulose fibers. Kaofin has also been found to contain heavy metals, PCBs, dioxins, PCP, and other byproducts of the paper manufacturing industry. Kaofin's physical properties are a grey, fine powder with a high rate of absorbency.

== History ==
Marcal first received permission to sell Kaofin, a waste product of its paper manufacturing processes, as a result of a BUD letter issued by the New Jersey Department of Environmental Protection in 1993.

Between 1993 and 1997, Marcal transported large quantities of Kaofin to disposal sites at the Top Soil Depot in Wayne, NJ and at Toms River, NJ.

== Toxicity ==
Kaofin was claimed to contain a number of substances toxic to humans and animals, including heavy metals, PCBs, dioxins, and PCP.
