= Metedeconk River =

River in New Jersey, United States

Coordinates: 40°03′08″N 74°05′13″W

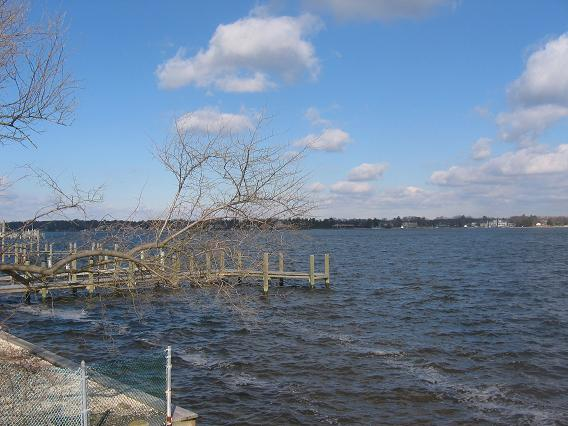
- Lower section of the Metedeconk in February.

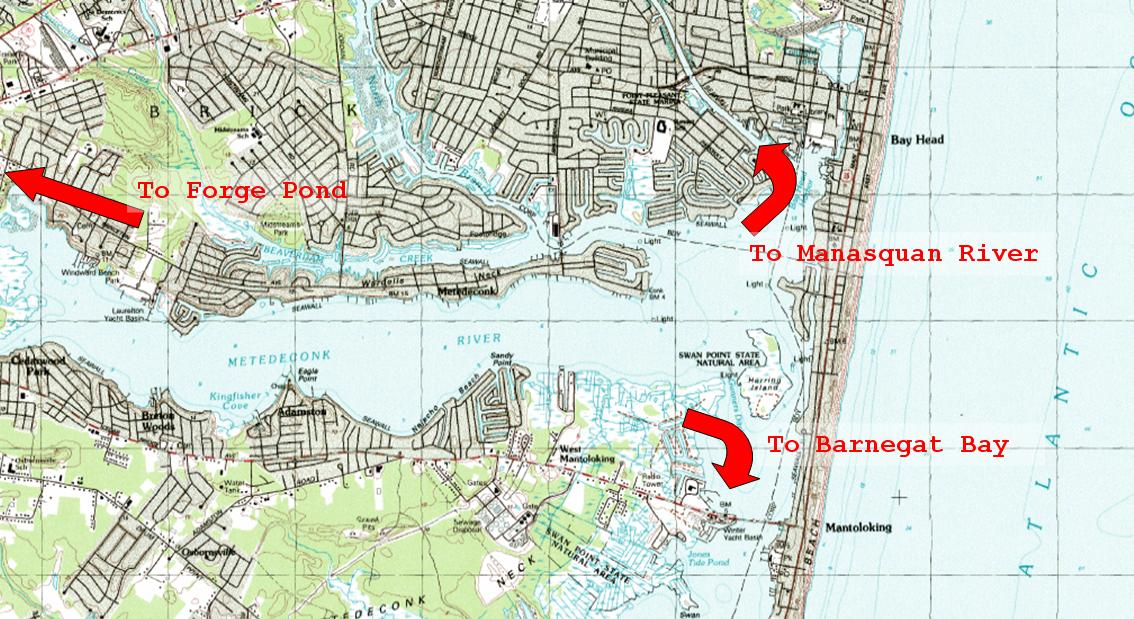
- Map of lower Metedeconk River. Grids are 1 kilometre (0.62 mi) square.

Physical characteristics
- Length: 22.3-mile-long (35.9 km)

The Metedeconk River /məˈtiːdəkʌŋk/ is a tributary of Barnegat Bay in Ocean County, New Jersey in the United States.

The Metedeconk River flows from its 22.3-mile-long (35.9 km) North and 22.6-mile-long (36.4 km) South Branches to their confluence at Forge Pond, where the river widens (up to just over 1 mile (1.6 km)) and flows southeast for 6 miles (9.7 km) into Barnegat Bay. It contains both fresh and salt-water portions.

Like many area streets, waterways and towns, Metedeconk is the original word or phrase used by the Indigenous Peoples to name themselves or to name themselves after their geography. Its name a direct reference to the Metedeconk Tribes who had two settlements, one on the North Side of the river bordering the Beaver-dam Creek in the region now called CedarCroft, and one on the south side.

== Geographic relation to nearby water features ==
At its most eastern face the river meets the Barnegat Peninsula, a populated but narrow strip (less than 1 mile (1.6 km) wide) of New Jersey separating the Metedeconk from a direct connection with the Atlantic Ocean. Here, the river joins the Barnegat Bay to the south and the narrow, man-made Point Pleasant Canal to the north. This canal provides a convenient connection to the Manasquan River, which would otherwise be completely separated from the Metedeconk by about 3 miles (4.8 km) of land. The Manasquan River is directly connected to the Atlantic Ocean, as is Barnegat Bay.

== Interactions with ocean waters ==
The river is of the floodplain type and is tidal, being indirectly connected to the Atlantic Ocean through the Barnegat Bay and the Manasquan River. The Metedeconk's main oceanic interactions are through the Manasquan, via the Point Pleasant Canal. In fact, before the canal was opened in 1926, the Metedeconk and the upper part of the Barnegat Bay were mainly fresh water environments and non-tidal. Today, due to ocean tides, the waters of the Bay and the Manasquan are both inlets and outlets of the Metedeconk.

Since the canal, the waters of the lower Metedeconk have been brackish to salty and the ecology of the area has changed considerably. A visual indication of the river's connection to the ocean is the cream to brown colored foam that sometimes collects where the Metedeconk's waves beat the sandy shores or manmade bulkheads. This foam consists of the microscopic organic material that naturally builds up in the presence of aquatic life; the process of filtering organics from water through wave-like action has been mechanized in most aquariums and is known there as foam fractionating.

As of October 29, 2012, due to the effects of Hurricane Sandy hitting New Jersey, an inlet opened between Barnegat Bay and the Atlantic Ocean at the river's east end, the storm having obliterated the dunes, roads, and houses that once blocked off the river from the ocean. Thus the Metedeconk technically opened to the Atlantic Ocean at the base of the Route 528 bridge, whose east end was washed away by the storm, until repairs could be attempted to the peninsula and the bridge. By February 2013, peninsula and bridge repair had effectively reclosed the inlet and reopened the bridge to limited traffic.

== Notable areas ==
The river west of Forge Pond (where it forks into North and South Branches) is known as the upper section, while the river east of Forge Pond is known as the lower section. The upper section is popular with paddle boaters. The lower section, being deeper, wider and wavier, is more popular with sailboats and powerboats.

A notable section of the lower Metedeconk is Windward Beach, a small beach sanctioned for public recreation. On the upper Metedeconk, the river flows through the fresh-water Lake Shenandoah, where a popular county park holds great attraction.

=== Metedeconk River Yacht Club ===
Metedeconk River Yacht Club was founded by a group of devoted yachtsmen in 1936. The primary purpose for which the club organized was to advance the sport of yachting and to promote the social enjoyment and good fellowship among its members.

== Importance to local communities ==
The Metedeconk River is important to local wildlife and the surrounding human populations, providing a place of recreation as it winds through the townships of Brick, Freehold Township, Howell, Jackson, Wall Township, Lakewood and Millstone Township. It is the primary source of drinking water for Brick, Point Pleasant Beach and Point Pleasant Borough. As such, it was classified as a Category 1 (C1) River, the highest level of protection offered rivers by the state of New Jersey.

== Wildlife ==
With both fresh-water and tidal wetland portions, the Metedeconk supports an extremely diverse range of wildlife. Wild rice grows along the banks along some portions of the Metedeconk. Bald eagles have been sighted there, and ospreys nest atop nearby trees and industrial towers and come to the river to fish. Sections of the river and surrounding estuary habitat are protected as parts of New Jersey’s extensive Edwin B. Forsythe National Wildlife Refuge, because of the river’s great significance to migratory birds and waterfowl.

Mammals of the Metedeconk include those typically found at New Jersey rivers, such as river otters and beavers. Aquatic life includes many species of fish and jellyfish, including one species whose bodies are about two-inches long and appear clear in daylight, but glow blue by night.

== Hurricane Sandy ==
In October 2012, under the influence of Hurricane Sandy, ocean waters directly infiltrated the south branch of the river at the area of the Mantoloking Bridge. Immediate impact of the hurricane on the river included a change in salinity of the river's ecosystem, as well as elevated contaminate levels caused by relevant water treatment facilities going temporarily off-line. The long-term impact of Hurricane Sandy on the river and its ecosystem remains an area of study.

== See also ==
- List of New Jersey rivers
