= Arthur Brisbane =

American journalist

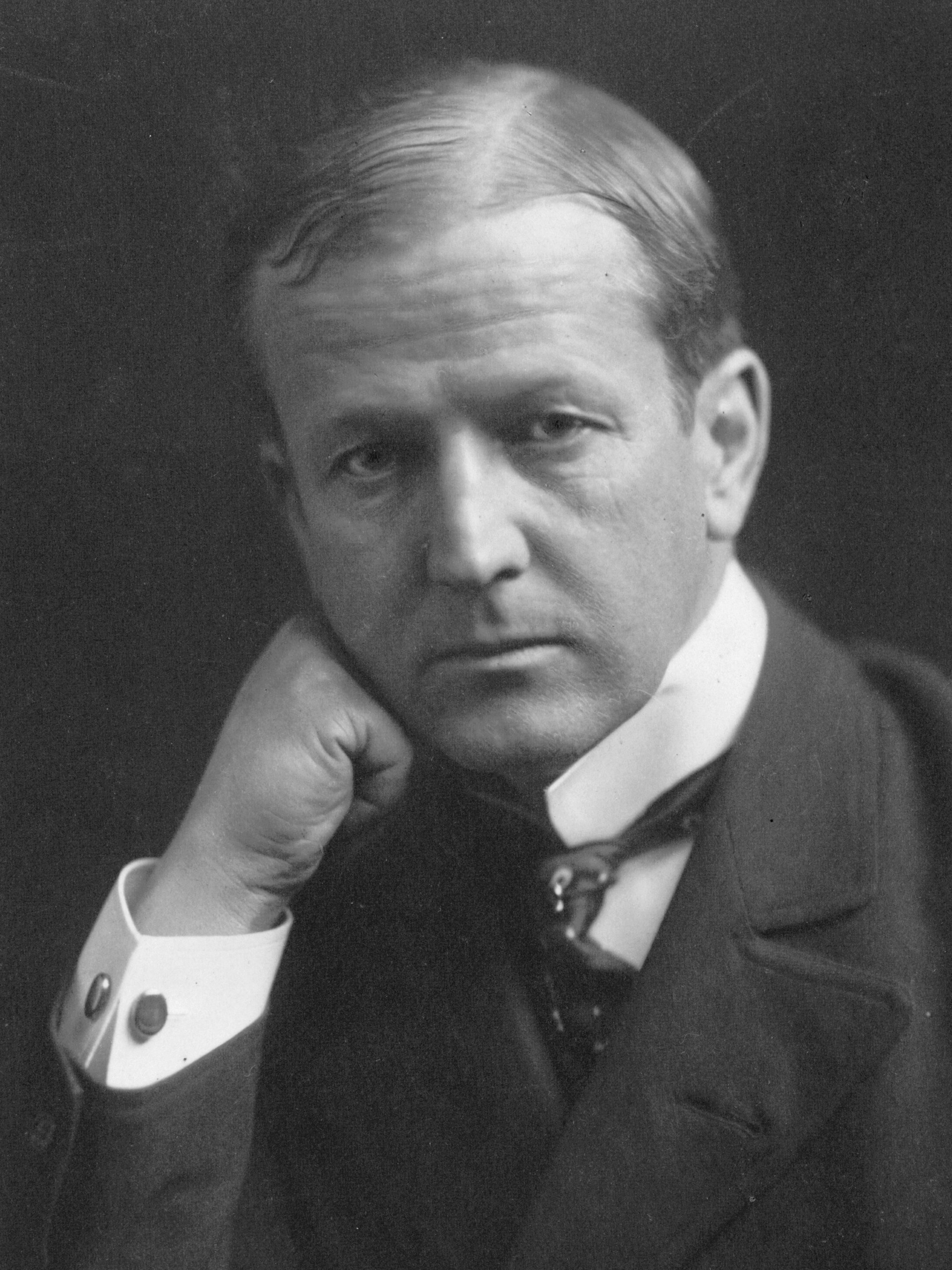
- Brisbane, c. 1906
- Born: December 12, 1864; Buffalo, New York, U.S.
- Died: December 25, 1936 (aged 72); New York City, U.S.
- Resting place: Batavia Cemetery
- Occupation: Newspaper editor
- Spouse: Phoebe Cary
- Children: 6
- Parent: Albert Brisbane

Arthur Brisbane (December 12, 1864 – December 25, 1936) was one of the best-known American newspaper editors of the 20th century, as well as a real estate investor.

== Biography ==
Brisbane was born in Buffalo, New York, to Albert Brisbane (1809–1890), an American utopian socialist who is remembered as the chief popularizer of the theories of Charles Fourier in the United States. Albert was the author of several books, including Social Destiny of Man (1840), as well as the Fourierist periodical The Phalanx. He also founded the Fourierist Society in New York in 1839, and backed several other phalanx communes in the 1840s and 1850s.

Arthur was educated in the United States and Europe.

== Career ==
In 1882, he began work as a newspaper reporter and editor in New York City, first at the Sun and later at Joseph Pulitzer's New York World. Hired away from Pulitzer by William Randolph Hearst, he became editor of the New York Journal and Hearst's close friend. His syndicated editorial column had an estimated daily readership of over 20 million, according to Time magazine.

In 1897, he accepted the editorship of the Evening Journal, flagship of the Hearst chain, and through it gained influence unmatched by any editor in the United States. His direct and forceful style influenced the form of American editorial and news writing. The saying, "If you don't hit the reader between the eyes in your first sentence of your news column, there's no need to write any more," is attributed to him.

Hearst biographer W. A. Swanberg described Brisbane as "a one-time socialist who had drifted pleasantly into the profit system... in some respects a vest-pocket Hearst – a personal enigma, a workhorse, a madman for circulation, a liberal who had grown conservative, an investor."

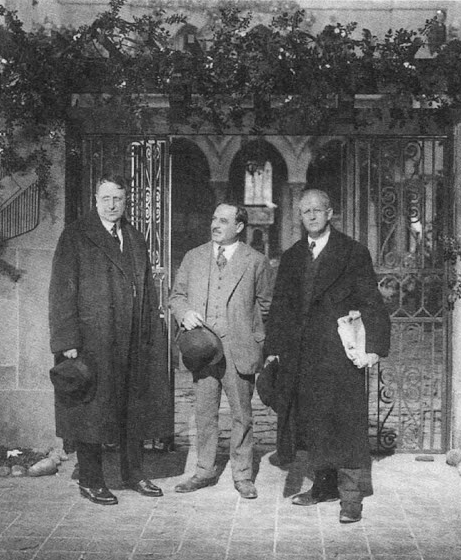
From left: William Randolph Hearst, Robert G. Vignola and Brisbane in New York during the filming of Vignola's The World and His Wife (1920)

While an employee of Hearst—at one point boasting of making $260,000 in a year—Brisbane also was known for buying failing newspapers, re-organizing them, and selling them to Hearst. He bought The Washington Times and the Milwaukee Evening Wisconsin in 1918 and sold both to Hearst 15 months later. He later bought the Detroit Times on behalf of Hearst.

Brisbane was accused of engaging in yellow journalism having published an editorial that called for the assassination of President McKinley. Although the article was pulled by Hearst after the first edition, many still blamed Hearst's journalists for provoking Leon Czolgosz to commit the fatal act.

In 1907, Ambrose Bierce and George Sterling credited Brisbane's editorials with stimulating the nationwide press furor over Sterling's poem "A Wine of Wizardry" when the poem appeared in Hearst's Cosmopolitan magazine. Sterling later said, "Brisbane told a friend of mine that one newsstand sold 600 Cosmopolitans the day after his first editorial appeared."

In 1918, he became editor of the Chicago Herald and Examiner, and in the 1920s became editor of Hearst's first tabloid, the New York Mirror. He remained part of the Hearst media empire until his death in 1936. His daughter Sarah married one of his Daily Mirror employees, Tex McCrary, who later became a radio-TV personality with second wife Jinx Falkenburg.

A 1926 Time magazine cover story described his influence:

The New York American, the Chicago Herald-Examiner, the San Francisco Examiner and many another newspaper owned by Publisher Hearst, to say nothing of some 200 non-Hearst dailies and 800 country weeklies which buy syndicated Brisbane, all publish what Mr. Brisbane has said. His column is headed, with simple finality, "Today", a column that vies with the weather and market reports for the size of its audience, probably beating both. It is said to be read by a third of the total U. S. population. Obviously this is an exaggeration, but half that many would be some 20 million readers, "Today" and every day.

Several volumes of Brisbane's editorials were published, including "The Book of Today", "The Book of Today and the Future Day", and "The Brisbane advertising philosophy". At the time of his death, he was considered the "virtual executive director" of the Hearst news and media empire.

Beginning in 1914, Winsor McCay illustrated many of Brisbane's editorials. From 1924 until 1935, artist Mel Cummin "originated and drew many of the big, eight-column cartoons" for Brisbane's editorials in the New York Sunday American, the New York Evening Journal and occasionally The Mirror. Cummin, a well-known member of the Explorer's Club, called Brisbane "a well-informed naturalist", and said the two collaborators discussed the subject of naturalism frequently.

He is also known to have invited the radical journalist and pamphleteer Eleanor Baldwin to move to New York to take up a writing job with him, but she declined the offer to remain at her home in the Pacific Northwest.

== Real estate ==
Partnering with Hearst, he formed Hearst-Brisbane Properties, investing heavily in New York real estate and developing projects such as the Ziegfeld Theatre, the Warwick Hotel, and the Ritz Tower. He was instrumental in preserving a large section of land he had amassed in central New Jersey along the Jersey Shore between 1907 and 1936. It was here that Brisbane built his dream house, a palatial mansion for its time, adjacent to a lake, and complete with a library tower. It was also here that Brisbane and his family could enjoy their favorite sport – horse-back riding. Brisbane transformed the Allaire area from a near-deserted village to a luxurious country estate, complete with a state-of-the-art horse farm, "Allaire Inn", toy factory, a camp for Boy Scouts, and training grounds during the war years. He used his professional connections to bring silent film companies to his property at Allaire, which was used as a backdrop. He even opened up his estate during the Great Depression to "New Deal" work programs. He employed a large staff to take care of his property at Allaire, which at one time was boasted to occupy 10,000 acres (40 km^{2}), though the actual count was closer to 6,000 acres (24 km^{2}).

Brisbane eventually began to explore the history of his property at Allaire and, in the 1920s, became aware of its great historic significance. The Allaire property had formerly been James P. Allaire's "Howell Iron Works Company", a thriving iron-making industrial village of the early 19th century. As early as 1925, Brisbane sought to preserve this property, with its vast natural resources and 19th century village buildings. Although not completed before his death, it was left to his wife, Phoebe Cary Brisbane and her immediate family to fulfill Brisbane's wishes of donating nearly 1,200 acres (4.9 km^{2}) to the State of New Jersey by 1944, including James P. Allaire's 19th century industrial village. The deed contained stipulations that it was to be used for historic and forest reservation purposes, and for nothing else. Moreover, the Brisbane family home served as the Arthur Brisbane Child Treatment Center until its closure in 2005. In the late 1930s Phoebe Brisbane also sold a former sand and gravel pit in Wall Township to the aviator Edward I. Brown, who built on it the airport now called Monmouth Executive Airport.

The original Brisbane gift of 1,200 acres (4.9 km^{2}) of land forms the heart of Allaire State Park. Its historic village is dedicated to portraying the life and times of James P. Allaire's "Howell Iron Works Company" largely through the non-profit educational organization, Allaire Village Inc. Efforts were pushed forward at the Historic Village at Allaire in 2006 by Allaire historian Hance M. Sitkus to better interpret Brisbane's career, family, and generosity, focusing on Brisbane as an often-overlooked humanitarian and philanthropist.

== Personal life ==
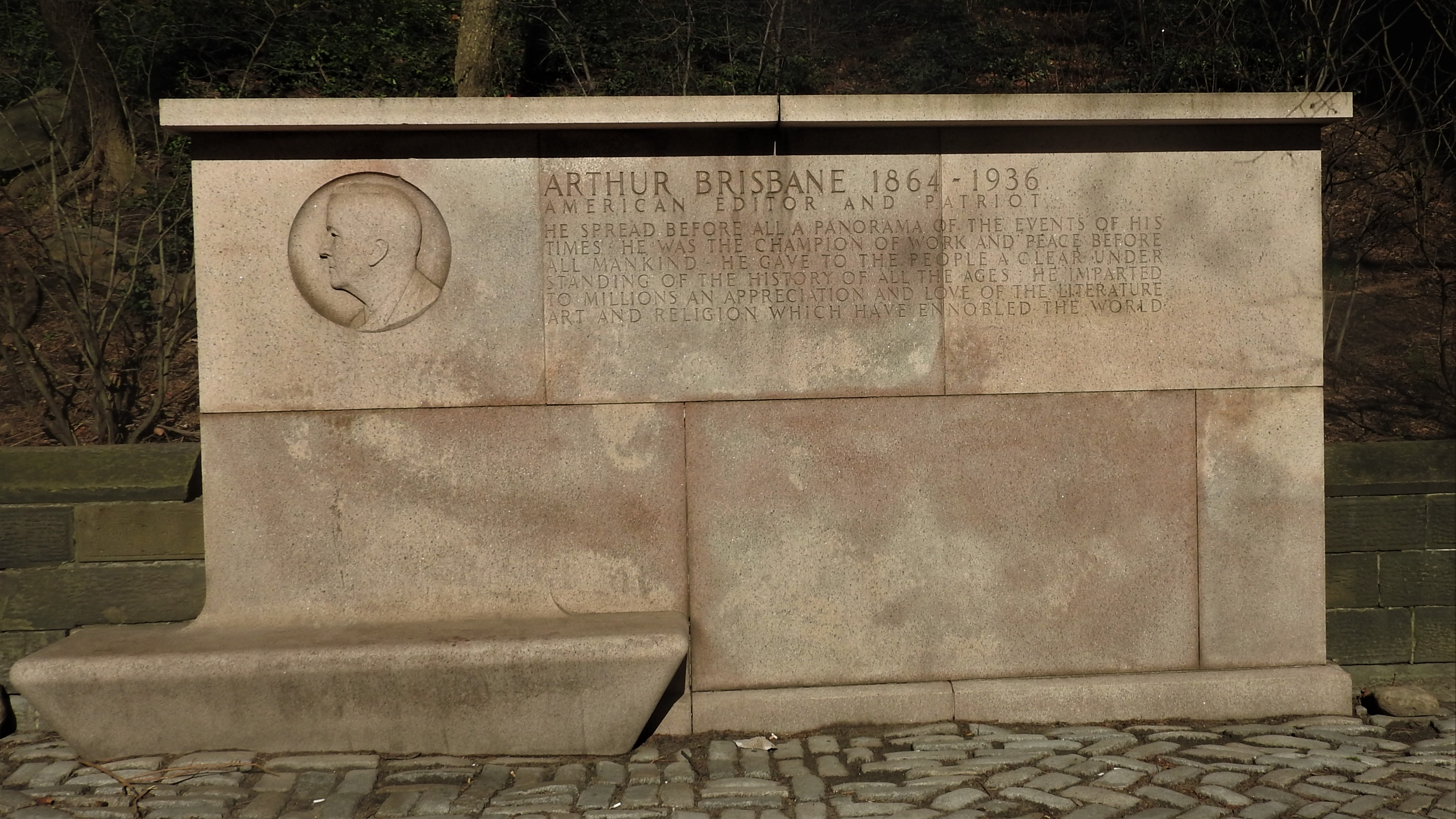
Arthur Brisbane monument in Central Park, New York City

Brisbane was married to Phoebe Cary (1890–1967), the eldest daughter of polo player Seward Cary and the former Emily Lisle Scatcherd. Phoebe's paternal great-grandfather, New York State Senator Trumbull Cary, was married to Brisbane's aunt, Margaret Elinor Brisbane. Together, they were the parents of six children:

- Sarah Brisbane McCrary Mellen (1913–1977)
- Seward Brisbane (1914–1989)
- Hugo Brisbane (1917–1933)
- Emily Brisbane (1918–1959)
- Alice Brisbane Chandor Tooker (1922–1983), married Lt. Elbert Haring Chandor in 1944
- Elinor Brisbane Kelley Philbin (1924–2009)

He died in Manhattan on Christmas Day, December 25, 1936, and was buried in the Batavia Cemetery at Batavia, New York.

His grandson, Arthur S. Brisbane, was appointed Public Editor of The New York Times in June 2010.

=== Impact ===
At his death, many journalists and politicians wrote tributes to his life and career. Hearst said, "I know that Arthur Brisbane was the greatest journalist of his day". Damon Runyon said "Journalism has lost its all-time No. 1 genius." Ogden Reid wrote that "American journalism has lost one of its most brilliant minds" and Robert R. McCormick said that Brisbane would "go down into history as one of the permanently great figures of American journalism". The Governor of New York, Herbert H. Lehman wrote "His wisdom, his courage and his power of sound and constructive criticism made him a national figure ... His passing is a great loss to the country."

== Selected published works ==
- Editorials from the Hearst Newspapers (1906)
- William Randolph Hearst (1906)
- Mary Baker G. Eddy (1908) [Reprinted with extended introduction: What Mrs. Eddy Said To Arthur Brisbane (1930)]
- Today and the future day (an analysis of two new books) with other articles (1925)

== See also ==
- List of people on the cover of Time magazine (1920s) – 16 Aug. 1926
- "A Wine of Wizardry" – Poem by George Sterling which Brisbane made controversial.

== Sources ==
- Nasaw, David (2000). The Chief: The Life of William Randolph Hearst. Boston: Houghton Mifflin. ISBN 0-395-82759-0.
