= New Jersey Museum of Transportation =

New Jersey Museum of Transportation & Pine Creek Railroad Museum
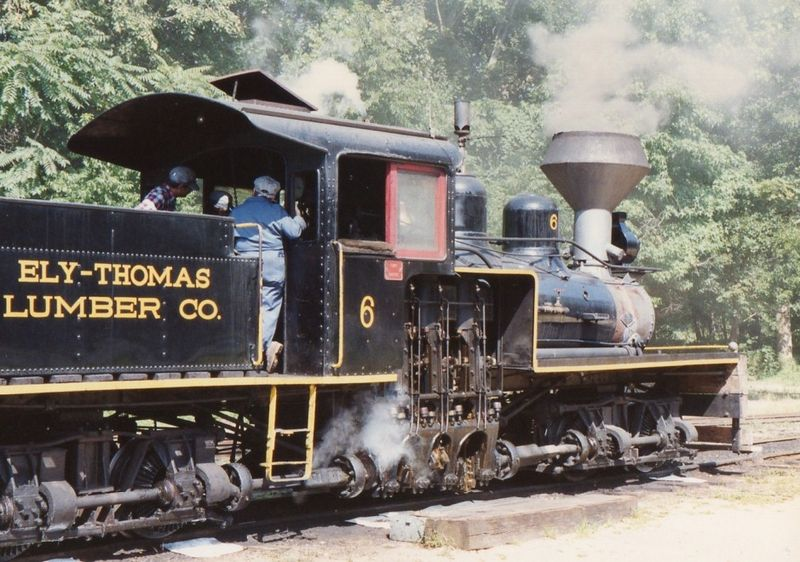
- The Ely-Thomas Lumber Company No. 6 train

- Location within Monmouth County, New Jersey
- Established: 1952
- Location: Wall Township, New Jersey located within Allaire State Park
- Coordinates: 40.160130°N 74.129861°W
- Type: Railroad museum
- Collections: See "Collections" for list
- Founders: James Wright; Jay L. Wulfson; Pierre "Pete" Rasmussen
- Parking: On-site
- Website: www.njmt.org

The New Jersey Museum of Transportation is a museum dedicated to the collection, preservation, and operation of historic railroad equipment. The organization runs excursion trains on a 3 ft (914 mm) narrow gauge tourist railroad named the Pine Creek Railroad. The museum is independently operated as a 501(c)(3) nonprofit organization along with the Allaire Village and is located in Allaire State Park in New Jersey. The museum runs Easter Bunny Express trains in April, Haunted Halloween trains in October, and Santa Special trains on the weekends in December.

== History ==
The origins of the New Jersey Museum of Transportation began with the purchase of a Baldwin 0-4-0T engine from the Raritan River Sand Company in 1952 by a pair of railroad enthusiasts. This first engine was named the Pine Creek No. 1 and was eventually sold to the Walt Disney company, where it was overhauled and renamed the #4 Ernest S. Marsh. The engine is still in use today at the Disneyland theme park in Anaheim, California, operating on the Disneyland Railroad, albeit rebuilt as a 2-4-0.

Initially a 2.5-acre (1.0 ha) plot of land on Route 9 in Marlboro was purchased where the railroad was run as a tourist attraction, but in 1952 when the organization was facing large property tax increases the not-for-profit Pine Creek Railroad Division of the New Jersey Museum of Transportation was formed and the operations were moved to its present-day location in Allaire State Park.

While the Pine Creek railroad loop runs adjacent to the abandoned Freehold and Jamesburg Agricultural Railroad that skirts the park (now known as the Edgar Felix Bikeway), it was never part of that rail line right-of-way.

== Collection ==
The following is only a partial listing of equipment that has been or is currently at the Museum.

| Original Owner | Number | Type | Date Built | Builder | Acquired | Sold | Status | Notes |
|---|---|---|---|---|---|---|---|---|
Steam Locomotives
| Raritan River Sand Co. | 10 | 0-4-0T | ? | Baldwin Locomotive Works | 1950 | 1959 | Off Roster | |
| Hope Natural Gas Company | 3 | 0-4-0T | ? | H. K. Porter, Inc | 1956 | 1960 | Off Roster | |
| Raritan Copper Works | 9 | 0-4-0T | 1924 | H. K. Porter, Inc | 1956 | N/A | In storage | |
| Ely-Thomas Lumber Co. | 6 | Two-Truck Shay | 1927 | Lima Locomotive Works | 1955 | N/A | In Storage | One of the last narrow gauge Shays left in the world |
| Chiriqui Land Co. | 46 | 2-6-0 | 1914 | H. K. Porter, Inc | 1969 | N/A | In Storage | |
| Cavan and Leitrim Railway | 3 | 4-4-0T | 1887 | Robert Stephenson & Co. | 1959 | N/A | In storage | |
| Lehigh Valley Coal Company | 117 | 0-4-0T | 1925 | Vulcan Iron Works | 2005 | N/A | On display | Lehigh Valley 0-4-0 locomotive #117 on display at the Pine Creek Railroad in November 2023 |
| Surry, Sussex and Southampton Railway | 26 | 2-6-2 | 1920 | Baldwin Locomotive Works | 2014 | N/A | In storage | |
Diesel Locomotives
| Plymouth Locomotive Works (?) | 1 | B | ? | Plymouth Locomotive Works | ? | N/A | In Storage | |
| Pouch Terminal Co. | 2 | B | 1929 | Mack Trucks Inc. | 1982 | N/A | In Storage | |
| Marcus Sand Company | 5 | B | 1920 (?) | Plymouth Locomotive Works | ? | | Operational | |
| Jackson Model 4000 Track Tamper | 12 | B | ? | Jackson | 2005 | N/A | Under Restoration | |
| US Steel | 39 | B-B | 1955 | General Electric | 1991 | N/A | In Storage | |
| US Steel | 41 | B-B | 1955 | General Electric | 1991 | N/A | Parts Only | |
| US Steel | 45 | B-B | 1955 | General Electric | 1991 | N/A | Operational | |
| Alcoa | 701 | B | 1920s | Davenport Locomotive Works | ? | N/A | In Storage | |
| United States Army | 7751 | B | 1942 | General Electric | 1977 | N/A | Operational | Ex-US Army GE 25 Ton Diesel Electric #7751 |
Rolling Stock
| United States Navy | ? | Flat car | 1942 (?) | United States Navy (?) | 1977 (?) | N/A | In Storage | |
| Raritan River Railroad | 7 | Caboose | ? | Raritan River Railroad (?) | 1920s (?) | N/A | Used as Office | |
| Newfoundland Railway | 502 | Coach | 1902 | ? | 1960s | N/A | Operational | |
| Newfoundland Railway | 509 | Coach | 1902 | ? | 1960s | N/A | In Storage | |
| East Broad Top Railroad | 824 | Hopper | ? | American Car and Foundry Company | 1967 (?) | N/A | Static Display | |
| Central Railroad of Pennsylvania (CNJ) | 22866 | Boxcar | Early 1940s | Association of American Railroads | 1983 (?) | N/A | Not Operational | |
| Central Railroad of Pennsylvania (CNJ) | 23193 | Boxcar | Early 1940s | Association of American Railroads | 1983 (?) | N/A | Not Operational | |
| Central Railroad of Pennsylvania (CNJ) | 24343 | Boxcar | Early 1940s | Association of American Railroads | 1983 (?) | N/A | Not Operational | |
| United States Navy | 331787 | Flat car / Excursion | 1942 | United States Navy (?) | 1977 | N/A | Operational | |
| Central Railroad of New Jersey | 91155 | Caboose | 1874 | New Jersey Southern Railroad | 1973 | N/A | Operational | |
| Central Railroad of New Jersey | 91245 | Caboose | 1893 | New Jersey Southern Railroad | ? | N/A | Under Restoration | |

=== Grounds ===
Buildings on the grounds include the Allenwood Station (built by the Pennsylvania Railroad in the early 1940s for use in Allenwood, NJ), the Freneau Station (built by the Jersey Central in the early 1900s on the CNJ Freehold Branch), a Union Newsstand (built circa 1910 in Manasquan, NJ, purchased in 1969), a crossing shanty, a maintenance shop, a heavy equipment building, a car barn (used for storage of rolling stock), as well as an office (Raritan River Railroad #7).

=== Sunken engines ===
In 1985, two steam engines were found side by side and in an upright position by charter boat Captain Dan Lieb in 90 feet (27 m) of water 5 miles (8.0 km) off the coast of Long Branch. Further identification of these engines occurred in 2004 when a team of diving and railroad enthusiasts working along with the History Channel production team investigated the engines. After viewing several digital images it was discovered, through the evidence of several artifacts on the engines, that they were Civil War-era Patentee Class 2-2-2T (Note: Planet Class were actually 2-2-0, 2-2-2 was the enlarged successor Patentee class.) locomotives from between 1850 and 1855.

On September 25, 2004, the New Jersey Museum of Transportation was granted custody of the two engines by U.S. District Judge Joseph Irenas. The museum hopes one day to raise the relics for display and interpretation at the museum.
