= Emily Grove =

Emily Grove may refer to:

- Emily Grove (athlete), American pole vaulter
- Emily Grove (singer), American singer-songwriter and musician
