= CLR 1 to 8 =

Locomotive class

Cavan & Leitrim Railway locomotives 1 to 8 GSR class DN2
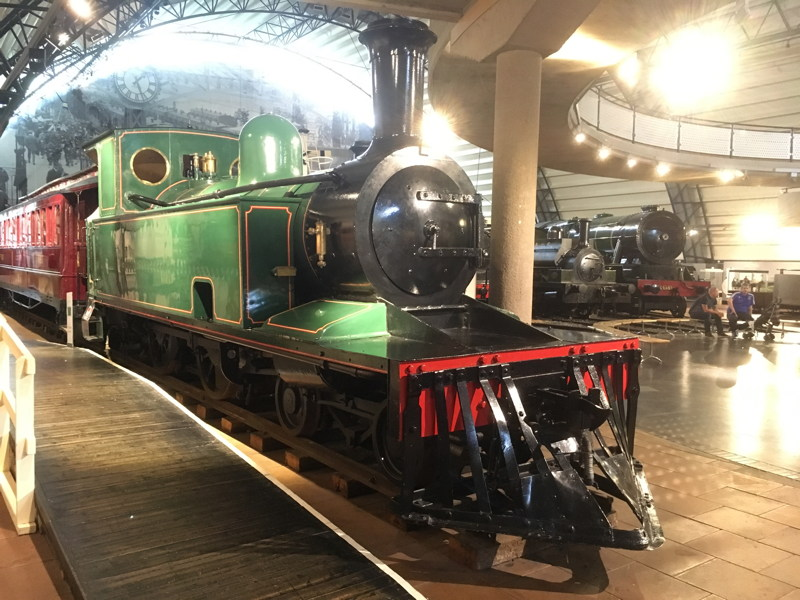
Type and origin
- Power type: Steam
- Builder: Robert Stephenson & Co.
- Serial number: 2612–2619
- Build date: 1887
- Total produced: 8
Specifications
- Configuration
  - Whyte: 4-4-0T
  - UIC: 2′B n2t
- Gauge: 3 ft (914 mm)
- Leading dia.: 2 ft 1 in (0.635 m)
- Driver dia.: 3 ft 6 in (1.067 m)
- Axle load: 9 long tons 5 cwt (20,700 lb or 9.4 t)
- Adhesive weight: 16 long tons 0 cwt (35,800 lb or 16.3 t)
- Loco weight: 27 long tons 0 cwt (60,500 lb or 27.4 t)
- Fuel type: Coal
- Fuel capacity: 1 long ton 0 cwt (2,200 lb or 1 t)
- Water cap.: 600 imp gal (2,700 L; 720 US gal)
- Firebox
  - Grate area: 9 sq ft (0.84 m^{2})
- Boiler pressure: 150 psi (1.03 MPa)
- Heating surface
  - Firebox: 48 sq ft (4.5 m^{2})
  - Tubes: 500 sq ft (46 m^{2})
- Cylinders: Two
- Cylinder size: 14 in × 20 in (356 mm × 508 mm)
Performance figures
- Tractive effort: 11,900 lbf (52.9 kN)
Career
- Operators: Cavan and Leitrim Railway; →Great Southern Railways; →Córas Iompair Éireann
- Class: GSR/CIÉ: 1L or DN2
- Numbers: C&L: 1–8, GSR/CIÉ: 1, 2L, 3L, 4L, 5, 6, 7, 8L
- Withdrawn: 1925–1959
- Preserved: Nos. 2 & 3
- Disposition: Two preserved, remainder scrapped

Cavan and Leitrim Railway 1 to 8 were 4-4-0T locomotives built by Robert Stephenson and Company, and were the first locomotives on the Cavan and Leitrim Railway (C&LR). On the 1925 amalgamation, when the railway became part of the Great Southern Railways, they were designated Class 1L or Class DN2.

The first section, some 34 miles (55 km) of what became the Cavan and Leitrim Railway (C&LR) from Dromod to Belturbet, was opened in October 1887. The branch line from Ballinamore to Arigna followed in May 1888 and in 1920 extended to the coal mines beyond the village. The line was closed in May 1959, leaving only the West Clare Railway as the sole surviving narrow gauge line in Ireland. On opening, the line had a fleet of eight steam locomotives, numbered 1 to 8.

== History ==
At its opening the C&LR had eight steam locomotives, all of the 4-4-0T wheel arrangement and built by Robert Stephenson and Company.

Locomotive Nos. 5 to 8 were supplied by the makers complete with skirting over wheels, cowcatcher, bell, and headlamp at the bunker end, typical of a "tramway - type" locomotive for use on open (unfenced) track. These locomotives were fitted with condensing gear and each cab was fitted with duplicate driving controls. Over time all eight locomotives were re-boilered, increasing their working weight from 25 to 27 long tons (25 to 27 t; 28 to 30 short tons).

On delivery the locomotives were unnamed and it was suggested that they be named after the Directors' daughters. Locomotive No. 1 was named "Isabel" after the daughter of R.H. Johnstone of Bawnboy House, the longest serving director of the C&LR. No. 8 "Queen Victoria" lost its nameplates under what were described as 'patriotic' circumstances in 1923. The plates were eventually found and the C&L insisted they should be restoring to the locomotive, but within a few days they disappeared again, and were never found.

At the 1925 amalgamation the C&LR became part of the Great Southern Railways and the above eight locomotives, the rolling stock and infrastructure passed to the new company (along with an 0-6-0T locomotive, No. 9 of 1904).

No.	Name	Builder	Wheel Arr.	Date Built	Makers No.	Withdrawn	Comments
1	Isabel	RS	4-4-0T	1887	2612	1949	(a)
2	Kathleen	RS	4-4-0T	1887	2613	1959	(a) Preserved at Ulster Folk and Transport Museum
3	Lady Edith	RS	4-4-0T	1887	2614	1959	(a) Preserved at New Jersey Museum of Transportation
4	Violet	RS	4-4-0T	1887	2615	1959	(a) Scrapped at Dromod in 1960
5	Gertrude	RS	4-4-0T	1887	2616	1925	Scrapped by GSR
6	May	RS	4-4-0T	1887	2617	1927	Scrapped by GSR
7	Olive	RS	4-4-0T	1887	2618	1945	(a) Stopped at Inchicore 1939
8	Queen Victoria	RS	4-4-0T	1887	2619	1959	(a) Scrapped at Ballinmore in 1959

All were rebuilt with larger boilers in 1902–1906.

(a) Rebuilt from 1930 with brick arch in firebox to burn hard Welsh coal instead of the soft product from Arigna's mines.

== Livery ==
Locomotives were painted green with red and white lining. Cast brass plates were attached, numbers to cabsides, nameplates to side tanks. Following takeover by the GSR in 1925, all locos were gradually painted the GSR standard plain unlined grey, with numerals painted in pale yellow on the tank sides. However, this did not happen overnight; two retained the original livery as late as 1932.

== Preservation ==
Two examples are preserved; No. 2 "Kathleen" was reserved for preservation and can be seen today in the Ulster Folk and Transport Museum together with an original C&LR coach. No. 3 "Lady Edith" was sold in April 1959 to New York businessman and rail enthusiast Edgar Mead and shipped over to the United States. It first went on display at Pleasure Island (Massachusetts amusement park) alongside locomotives that later formed part of Steamtown, U.S.A. In 1962 the engine was relocated to the 3 ft-gauge Pine Creek Railroad, now part of New Jersey Museum of Transportation and restored to operating condition by 1967 in Allaire State Park, where it remains to this day as of 2023. It has not operated since the mid-1990s due to changes in federal standards for steam locomotives in the US.
