= Allaire, New Jersey =

Populated place in Monmouth County, New Jersey, US

- Unincorporated community
- Location in Monmouth County Location in New Jersey Location in the United States
- Coordinates: 40°09′30″N 74°07′32″W
- Country: United States
- State: New Jersey
- County: Monmouth
- Township: Wall

Area
  - Total: 22.232 sq mi (57.580 km^{2})
  - Land: 21.989 sq mi (56.950 km^{2})
  - Water: 0.243 sq mi (0.630 km^{2}) 1.32%
- Elevation: 33 ft (10 m)

Population (2010 Census)
  - Total: 7,050
- Time zone: UTC−05:00 (Eastern (EST))
  - Summer (DST): UTC−04:00 (Eastern (EDT))
- ZIP code: 07727
- Area codes: 732/848
- GNIS feature ID: 882972

Allaire is an unincorporated community located within Wall Township in Monmouth County, in the U.S. state of New Jersey. As of the 2010 United States census, the ZIP Code Tabulation Area for ZIP Code 07727 had a population of 7,050.
