= Eleanor Baldwin =

- Born: April 7, 1854 Naugatuck, Connecticut, USA
- Died: December 26, 1928 (aged 74) Portland, Oregon, USA
- Resting place: River View Cemetery, Portland, Oregon, USA
- Occupation: Journalist
- Subject: Labor rights, women's rights

Eleanor Florence Baldwin (1854-1928) was a Progressive Era radical journalist and pamphleteer who wrote newspaper columns, treatises, and gave pro-suffrage speeches in Portland, Oregon. Baldwin was an advocate for labor rights and women's rights, a “critic of finance capitalism with an abolitionist heritage” who denounced the Catholic Church and once wrote an article for the official newspaper of the Ku Klux Klan, The Western American.

== Early life and family ==
Baldwin was born April 7, 1854, in Naugatuck, Connecticut, to a New England Methodist circuit preacher and abolitionist. Her mother's maiden name was Willard. She had a brother named Henry who held similar radical views to her own, supporting both the Greenback and Populist parties.

Most of Baldwin's childhood was spent in the Northeastern United States in Provincetown, Cape Cod, and Boston. She moved to Portland, Oregon sometime around 1905.

== Community involvement ==
Baldwin was a member of the Women's Press Club until 1928. She gave several lectures on social issues in Portland, Oregon. She spoke on “State Capitalism or Socialism: Which?," reviewed “The Food Gamblers,” a motion picture play, and rebutted via speech the “assumption that only men are fit for affairs of government” to an audience of suffragettes in Portland, Oregon.

== Professional life ==
Baldwin spent more of her life writing about “wage slaves,” or those who are totally dependent on employment income. She visited the Women's Political Study League August 5, 1916, and spoke on “The Development of Women Through Organization.” She was on staff of the Portland Telegram for several years writing daily columns for the editorial page “A Woman’s Point of View,” between 1906 and 1909. Her column was removed in 1909 after she advocated for a white woman's right to marry a Japanese man. Baldwin also wrote several short stories and a book called Money Talks, about the function and value of money; it defined money as being a “social force” that belonged to society and when used as intended would “enable workers to consume what they needed.” She was invited to move to New York to take up a writing job with Arthur Brisbane, a well-known American newspaper editor and real estate developer, but declined as she wanted to stay in the Pacific Northwest.

== Legacy and death ==
Baldwin was known for her work on women's suffrage and other social feminist issues, as well as for “linking crass materialism with male power and corruption.” She used her newspaper column for women to address issues of capitalism and progressive populist and reform movements. She advocated for women in the workplace, encouraging those who were finding their way in a male-dominated field. She also was an activist for civil rights, defending people of color while condemning police brutality.

Eleanor died at the age of 74 of carcinoma in her left breast on December 26, 1928. Funeral services were held at her residence by a pastor of the First Divine Science Church in Tacoma, Reverend Henry Victor Morgan. She is buried in River View Cemetery in SW Portland, Oregon.
