= Wall Township, New Jersey =

Township in Monmouth County, New Jersey, US

- Township
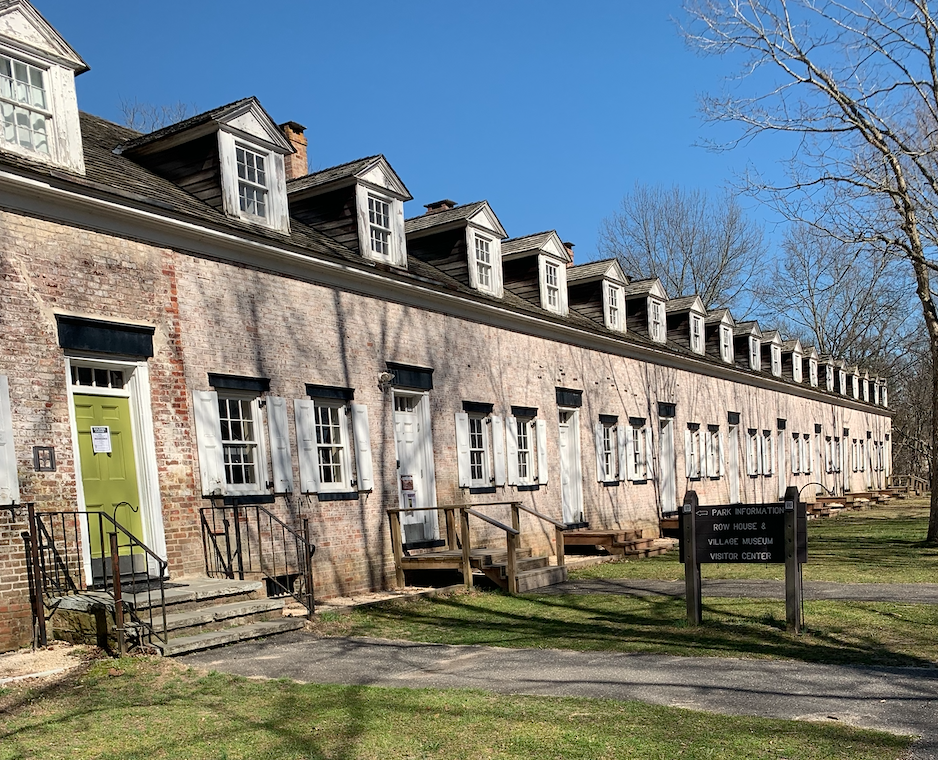
- Historic Rowhouses in the Allaire Village of Wall Township

- Seal

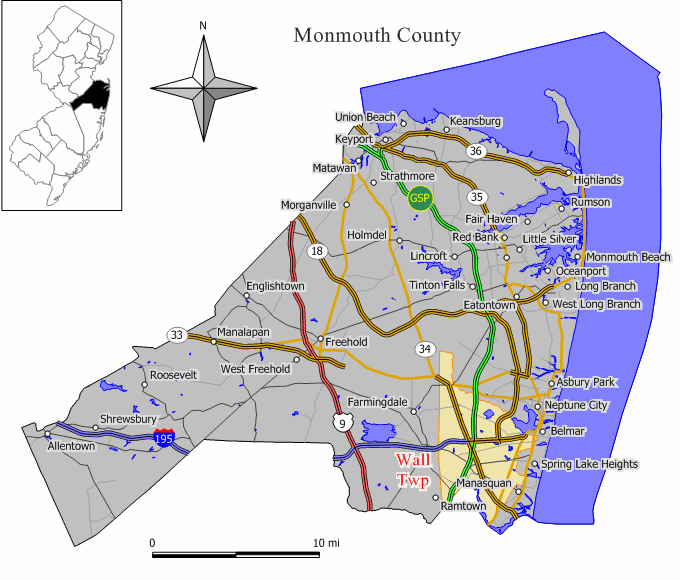
- Location of Wall Township in Monmouth County highlighted in yellow (right). Inset map: Location of Monmouth County in New Jersey highlighted in black (left).
- Interactive map of Wall Township, New Jersey
- Location in Monmouth County Location in New Jersey Location in the United States
- Coordinates: 40.165827°N 74.09799°W
- Country: United States
- State: New Jersey
- County: Monmouth
- Incorporated: March 7, 1851
- Named for: Garret D. Wall

Government
  - Type: Township
  - Body: Township Committee
  - Mayor: Timothy J. Clayton (R, term ends December 31, 2025)
  - Administrator: John W. Tobia
  - Municipal clerk: Roberta Lang

Area
  - Total: 31.69 sq mi (82.08 km^{2})
  - Land: 30.66 sq mi (79.41 km^{2})
  - Water: 1.03 sq mi (2.67 km^{2}) 3.25%
  - Rank: 80th of 565 in state 7th of 53 in county
- Elevation: 98 ft (30 m)

Population (2020)
  - Total: 26,525
  - Estimate (2023): 26,530
  - Rank: 96th of 565 in state 9th of 53 in county
  - Density: 865.2/sq mi (334.1/km^{2})
  - Rank: 399th of 565 in state 48th of 53 in county
- Time zone: UTC– 05:00 (Eastern (EST))
  - Summer (DST): UTC– 04:00 (Eastern (EDT))
- ZIP Codes: 07719 – Belmar; 07727 – Farmingdale; 07731 – Howell; 07753 – Neptune; 07762 – Spring Lake and Spring Lake Heights; 08724 – Brick; 08736 – Manasquan; 08750 – Sea Girt
- Area code: 732
- FIPS code: 3402576460
- GNIS feature ID: 0882112
- Website: www.wallnj.gov

Wall Township is a township within Monmouth County, in the U.S. state of New Jersey. Crisscrossed by several different highways within the heart of the Jersey Shore region, the township is a transportation hub of Central New Jersey and a bedroom suburb of New York City, in the New York metropolitan area. As of the 2020 United States census, Wall Township's population was 26,525, its highest decennial count ever and an increase of 361 (+1.4%) from the 2010 census count of 26,164, which in turn reflected an increase of 903 (+3.6%) from the 25,261 counted in the 2000 census.

Wall Township was formally incorporated as a township by an act of the New Jersey Legislature on March 7, 1851. Over the years, portions of the township have been taken to form North Spring Lake (May 1884), Ocean Beach (March 9, 1885, now Belmar), Manasquan (December 30, 1887), Spring Lake (March 14, 1892), Sea Girt (March 29, 1917), Brielle (April 10, 1919), South Belmar (March 12, 1924, since renamed as Lake Como) and Spring Lake Heights (March 19, 1927).

Wall Township was named for General Garret D. Wall (1783–1850), a lawyer who commanded a Trenton volunteer company during the War of 1812 and was stationed at Sandy Hook. Wall served five years as clerk of the New Jersey Supreme Court and as quartermaster general of the state for more than 20 years before being chosen to represent the state in the United States Senate from 1835 to 1841.

== History ==
The Greenville Cemetery was established in 1734, when a casualty of the French and Indian War was buried there. The original structure of the Glendola Protestant Bible Church was built in 1776; The congregation dedicated a new church in 1964.

Allaire Village dates back to 1822, when James P. Allaire purchased what became known as the Howell Works in Wall, and though it was the largest producing bog iron manufacturing site in New Jersey by 1836, the ironworks were shut down in 1846. The village and surrounding acres were later preserved and gifted to the State of New Jersey to form Allaire State Park as a memorial to Hearst editor Arthur Brisbane, the last private owner of the site, who purchased the land in 1907 and built a palatial residence on that property that would later serve as the Arthur Brisbane Child Treatment Center. The Brisbane family donated the property to the State of New Jersey to establish Allaire State Park and the Historic Village at Allaire. Allaire Village Inc., a non-profit organization, is licensed by the State of New Jersey to operate the site now known as "The Historic Village at Allaire."

The Allgor–Barkalow Homestead at 1701 New Bedford Road was constructed in 1840, although some accounts indicate construction of part of the building began in the 18th century. The building now houses the museum of the Old Wall Historical Society. The Blansingburg schoolhouse at Sea Girt Avenue opened in 1855; The building was relocated in 1999 to the Allgor-Barkalow Homestead Museum property for refurbishing.

In 1851, Wall Township was formed from portions of Howell Township.

The newly formed Marconi Wireless Telegraph Company of America, with its home office in England, purchases a 93-acre (38 ha) farm around 1900 that became the site of the company's receiver equipment for commercial transatlantic radio operation. The Marconi signal site was abandoned in 1924, but it was later occupied by the Ku Klux Klan until they were ejected in March 1928. The United States Army purchased the Marconi site in November 1941 and named it Camp Evans.

The Allenwood Hospital, located at the corner of Squankum-Allenwood and Hospital roads, opened in January 1921 as a sanatorium for tuberculosis patients. In 1957, a 16-room building is dedicated to Geraldine L. Thompson, who served as president of the hospital's board of managers. In the 1960s, the facility becomes an annex to the John L. Montgomery Medical Home in Freehold Township, a county-run nursing home, and was renamed the Geraldine L. Thompson Care Center. In early 2016, Monmouth County finalized the sale of the nursing home to Preferred Care Holdings LLC for $15 million, which was renamed Preferred Care at Wall.

In 1940, Edward I. Brown used an old World War I tank converted into a bulldozer to clear land for an airport that he turned into what is now Monmouth Executive Airport after completing his service in the United States Navy as a pilot during World War II; A sale of the airport by the Brown family to a private equity firm was announced in 2007, despite lengthy attempts by Monmouth County to acquire the facility, but was not completed; the family sold the airport in December 2013 to an investment group, Wall Aviation.

Wall Stadium, which opened in 1950, is located just south of Monmouth Executive Airport and north of Interstate 195 on Route 34 and was the first track that NASCAR champion Richard Petty raced on in the United States. In 2019, plans were announced to close the track after the 2020 season and construct houses on the site. However those plans fell through and racing has continued; the track will host the NASCAR Local Racing Series in 2026 for the first time in nearly two decades.

The Roadside Diner, formerly the Circle Diner and Rusty's, was delivered to its Route 34 site by the Silk City Diner Co. in the 1940s. The diner was used for filming of a scene for the 1983 movie Baby It's You and appears on the cover of the 1994 Bon Jovi album Cross Road: 14 Classic Grooves, as well as having been featured in the 2008 music video for "Girls in Their Summer Clothes" by Bruce Springsteen.

Wall High School opened in September 1959, while Wall Intermediate School opened in 1967.

Interstate 195 was extended into Wall Township in 1981, giving direct high-speed access to Trenton.

A suit filed by the American Civil Liberties Union in December 1999 against the township over a holiday display that included a nativity scene and a Hannukah menorah, contending that the religious symbols violate the constitutional separation of church and state, was dismissed by a judge who ruled that the organization had filed its suit too close to the start of the holiday season. The United States Court of Appeals for the Third Circuit issued a ruling in April 2001 vacating the decision of the district court in the case that the township's holiday display as modified in 2000 to include other seasonal decorations did not violate the Establishment Clause or the New Jersey Constitution and ruling that the ACLU lacked standing to file the case.

Even though many of the surrounding municipalities sprung out of Wall Township, the only ZIP code that exclusively serves areas of Wall is Allenwood, but even it relies solely on a Post-office box system for regular mail services.

== Geography ==
According to the United States Census Bureau, the township had a total area of 31.69 square miles (82.08 km^{2}), including 30.66 square miles (79.41 km^{2}) of land and 1.03 square miles (2.67 km^{2}) of water (3.25%).

Allenwood (2020 Census population of 954) and West Belmar (2,459) are census-designated places and unincorporated communities located within Wall Township.

Other unincorporated communities, localities and place names located partially or completely within the township include Algers Mills, Allaire, Baileys Corner, Blansingburg, Carmerville, Collingwood Park, Glendola, Hurleys Mills, Lake Como, New Bedford, Old Mill, Osborn Island, Osbornes Mills, Remsen Mills, Shark River, Sterling Woods, Treasure Island and Wallington.

Wreck Pond is a tidal pond located on the coast of the Atlantic Ocean, surrounded by Wall Township and the boroughs of Spring Lake, Spring Lake Heights, and Sea Girt. The Wreck Pond watershed covers about 12 square miles (31 km^{2}) in eastern Monmouth County.

The township borders the municipalities of Belmar, Brielle, Colts Neck Township, Howell Township, Lake Como, Manasquan, Neptune Township, Sea Girt, Spring Lake, Spring Lake Heights and Tinton Falls in Monmouth County; and Brick Township in Ocean County.

In 2005, the Township de-annexed its southernmost portion in favor of Howell Township.

As of 2026, the township is a member of Local Leaders for Responsible Planning in order to address the township's Mount Laurel doctrine-based housing obligations.

== Demographics ==
Historical population
Census	Pop.	Note	%±
1860	2,283		—
1870	2,671		17.0%
1880	3,829		43.4%
1890	3,269	*	−14.6%
1900	3,212	*	−1.7%
1910	3,817		18.8%
1920	3,324	*	−12.9%
1930	3,540	*	6.5%
1940	4,383		23.8%
1950	7,386		68.5%
1960	11,929		61.5%
1970	16,498		38.3%
1980	18,952		14.9%
1990	20,244		6.8%
2000	25,261		24.8%
2010	26,164		3.6%
2020	26,525		1.4%
2023 (est.)	26,530		0.0%
Population sources: 1860–1920; 1860–1870 1870 1880–1890; 1890–1910 1910–1930; 1900–1990 2000; 2010 2020 * = Lost territory in previous decade.

=== 2010 census ===
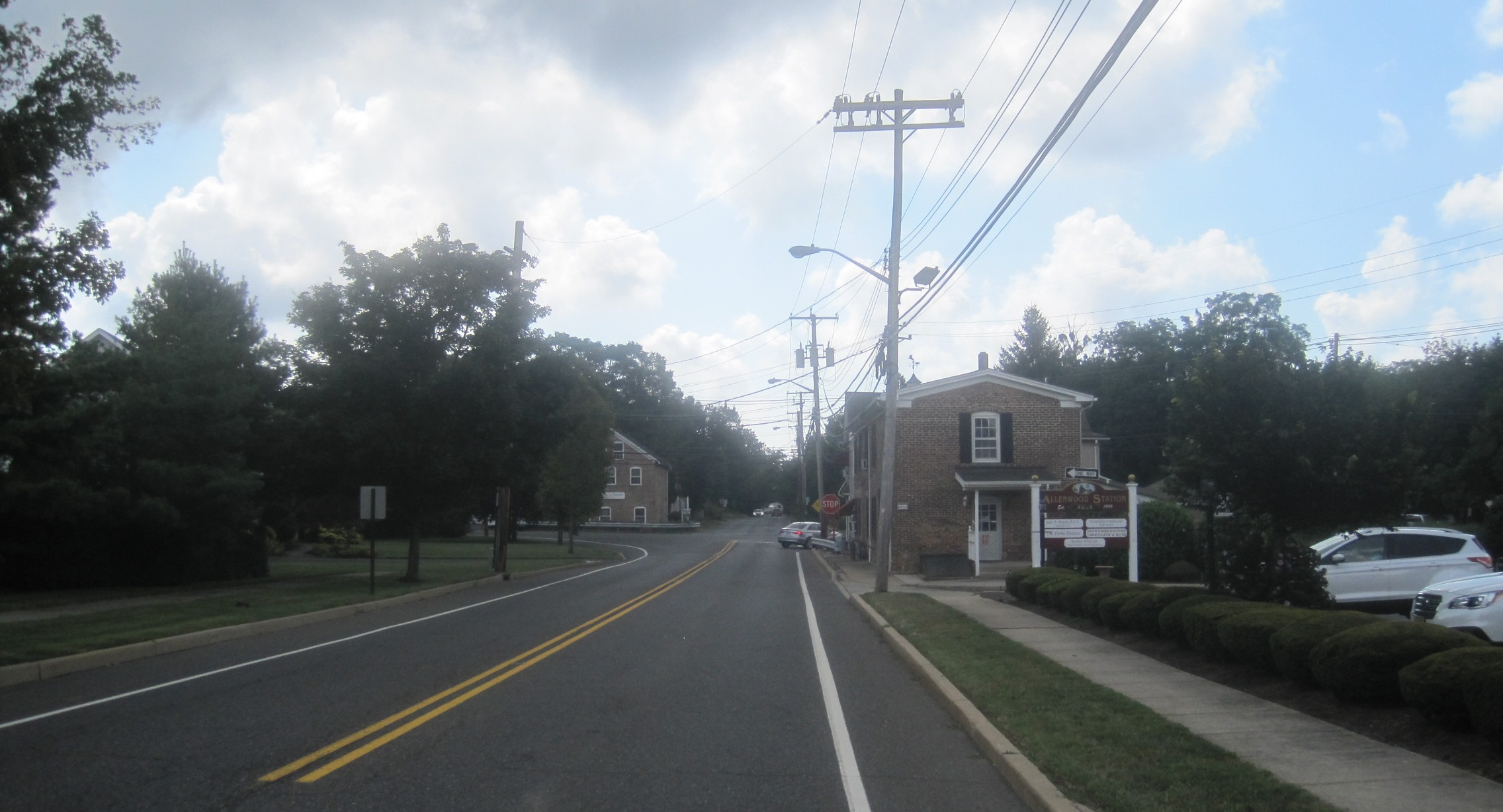
The Allenwood neighborhood in Wall Township

The 2010 United States census counted 26,164 people, 10,051 households, and 7,066 families in the township. The population density was 853.0 per square mile (329.3/km^{2}). There were 10,883 housing units at an average density of 354.8 per square mile (137.0/km^{2}). The racial makeup was 93.72% (24,521) White, 2.44% (639) Black or African American, 0.16% (41) Native American, 1.61% (421) Asian, 0.01% (2) Pacific Islander, 0.91% (237) from other races, and 1.16% (303) from two or more races. Hispanic or Latino of any race were 3.47% (908) of the population.

Of the 10,051 households, 30.9% had children under the age of 18; 57.6% were married couples living together; 9.6% had a female householder with no husband present and 29.7% were non-families. Of all households, 25.2% were made up of individuals and 11.6% had someone living alone who was 65 years of age or older. The average household size was 2.57 and the average family size was 3.11.

23.5% of the population were under the age of 18, 6.5% from 18 to 24, 20.0% from 25 to 44, 32.9% from 45 to 64, and 17.1% who were 65 years of age or older. The median age was 45.0 years. For every 100 females, the population had 92.2 males. For every 100 females ages 18 and older there were 87.7 males.

The Census Bureau's 2006–2010 American Community Survey showed that (in 2010 inflation-adjusted dollars) median household income was $89,278 (with a margin of error of +/− $6,640) and the median family income was $108,865 (+/− $6,748). Males had a median income of $75,198 (+/− $3,706) versus $51,969 (+/− $5,806) for females. The per capita income for the borough was $46,514 (+/− $2,483). About 3.1% of families and 4.1% of the population were below the poverty line, including 4.7% of those under age 18 and 4.5% of those age 65 or over.

=== 2000 census ===
As of the 2000 United States census there were 25,261 people, 9,437 households, and 6,926 families residing in the township. The population density was 825.1 inhabitants per square mile (318.6/km^{2}). There were 9,957 housing units at an average density of 325.2 per square mile (125.6/km^{2}). The racial makeup of the township was 97.09% White, 0.61% African American, 0.10% Native American, 1.26% Asian, 0.04% Pacific Islander, 0.32% from other races, and 0.58% from two or more races. Hispanic or Latino of any race were 1.55% of the population.

There were 9,437 households, out of which 33.8% had children under the age of 18 living with them, 63.0% were married couples living together, 8.0% had a female householder with no husband present, and 26.6% were non-families. 22.7% of all households were made up of individuals, and 9.7% had someone living alone who was 65 years of age or older. The average household size was 2.64 and the average family size was 3.14.

In the township the population was spread out, with 25.2% under the age of 18, 5.1% from 18 to 24, 28.4% from 25 to 44, 26.8% from 45 to 64, and 14.4% who were 65 years of age or older. The median age was 40 years. For every 100 females, there were 92.7 males. For every 100 females age 18 and over, there were 88.4 males.

The 2000 Census showed that median household income for the township was $73,989 and the median family income was $83,795. Males had a median income of $61,022 versus $37,011 for females. The per capita income for the township was $32,954. About 1.7% of families and 2.3% of the population were below the poverty line, including 2.5% of those under age 18 and 2.9% of those age 65 or over.

== Parks and recreation ==
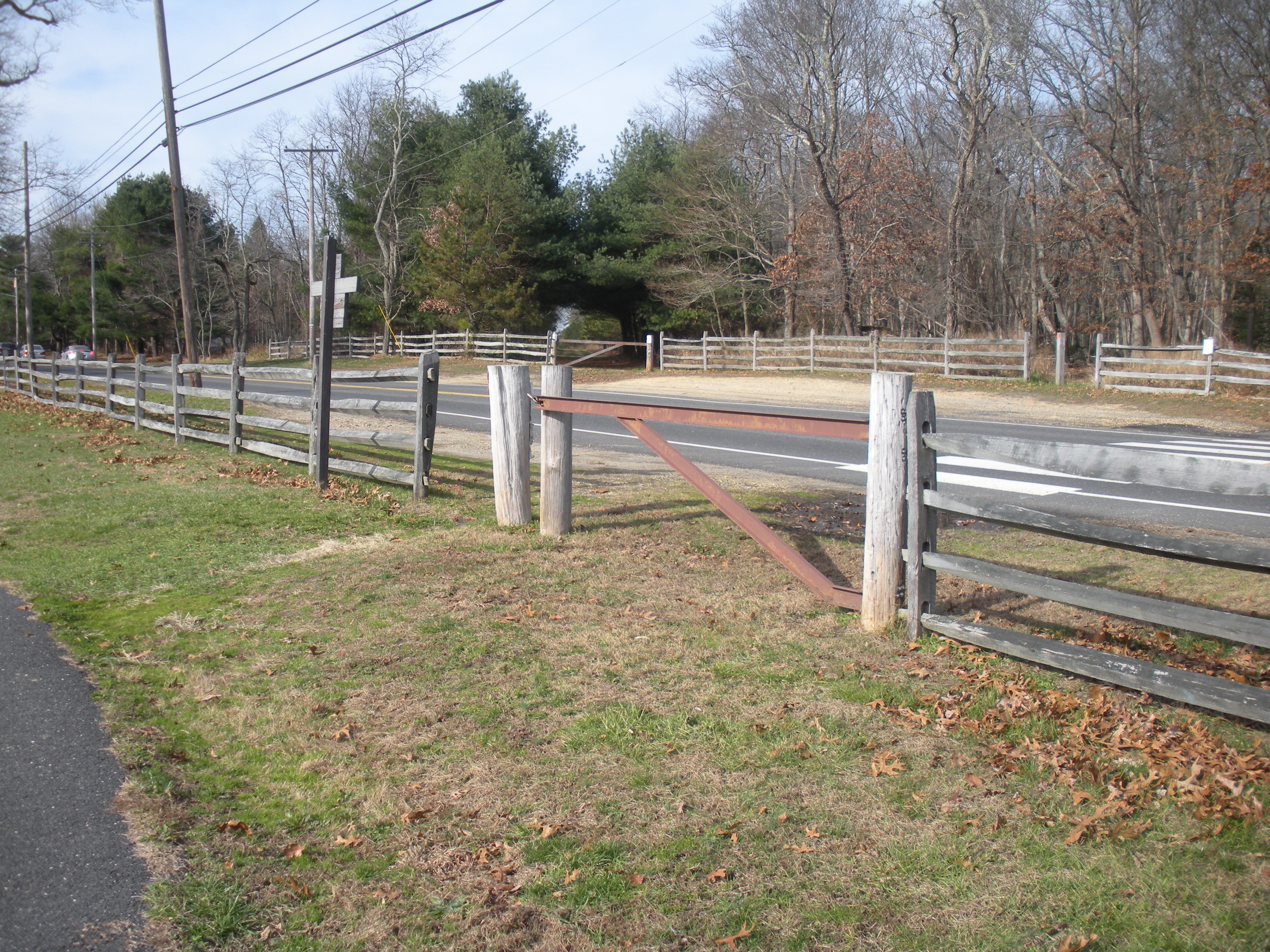
Edgar Felix Bikeway crossing Atlantic Avenue

Brick Township Reservoir, with parts located in both Wall and Brick Township, covers 80 acres (32 ha) and is encircled by a 1.7-mile (2.7 km) trail. Fishing is permitted on the reservoir. The reservoir can hold up to 1 billion US gallons (3.8×10^{9} L; 830,000,000 imp gal) of water, which is pumped in from the Metedeconk River.

Wall also has around 20 locations for outdoor activities including public parks, playgrounds, recreational sports fields, and other open outdoor spaces for hiking, cycling, fishing, and hunting. Parts of Allaire State Park and the Edgar Felix Bikeway are found in Wall Township.

== Government ==
=== Local government ===
Wall is governed under the Township form of New Jersey municipal government, one of 141 municipalities (of the 564) statewide that use this form, the second-most commonly used form of government in the state. It is the oldest form of government in New Jersey, having been first established in 1798, and enhanced by the Township Act of 1989. The Township Committee is comprised of five members, who are elected directly by the voters at-large in partisan elections to serve three-year terms of office on a staggered basis, with either one or two seats coming up for election each year as part of the November general election in a three-year cycle. Each year, at the annual reorganization meeting, the Township Committee selects one of its members to preside as mayor for the year, and another to serve as deputy mayor. It is the only form of government in which the mayor is not elected directly by the voters of the municipality. Wall is one of 11 Monmouth County municipalities that use the Township form of government.

As of 2025, the members of the Wall Township Committee are Mayor Timothy J. Clayton (R, term on committee and as mayor ends December 31, 2025), Deputy Mayor Daniel F. Becht (R, term on committee ends 2026; term as deputy mayor ends 2025), Timothy J. Farrell (R, 2027), Erin M. Mangan (R, 2026) and Kevin P. Orender (R, 2025).

Jeffrey Foster resigned from his position on the Township Committee in July 2014 to seek a position with the township. Dominick DiRocco was appointed later that month to fill the vacant seat expiring in December 2016 and won election to serve the balance of the term of office.

=== Federal, state and county representation ===
Wall Township is located in the 4th Congressional District and is part of New Jersey's 30th state legislative district.

For the 119th United States Congress, New Jersey's 4th congressional district is represented by Chris Smith (R, Manchester Township). New Jersey is represented in the United States Senate by Democrats Cory Booker (Newark, term ends 2027) and Andy Kim (Moorestown, term ends 2031).

For the 2026–2027 session, the 30th legislative district of the New Jersey Legislature is represented in the State Senate by Robert Singer (R, Lakewood Township) and in the General Assembly by Sean T. Kean (R, Wall Township) and Avi Schnall (D, Lakewood Township).

Monmouth County is governed by a Board of County Commissioners composed of five members who are elected at-large to serve three-year terms of office on a staggered basis, with either one or two seats up for election each year as part of the November general election. At an annual reorganization meeting held in the beginning of January, the board selects one of its members to serve as director and another as deputy director.

As of 2026, Monmouth County's Commissioners are Director Thomas A. Arnone (R, Neptune City, 2028),Deputy Director Nick DiRocco (R, Wall Township, 2028), Susan M. Kiley (R, Hazlet Township, 2027), Erik Anderson (R, Shrewsbury, 2026), and Ross F. Licitra (R, Marlboro Township, 2026).

Constitutional officers elected on a countywide basis are Clerk Christine Giordano Hanlon (R, 2030; Ocean Township), Sheriff Shaun Golden (R, 2028; Howell Township) and Surrogate Maureen Raisch (R, 2026; Middletown Township).

=== Politics ===
United States presidential election results for Wall Township
Year	Republican		Democratic		Third party(ies)	
Year	No.	%	No.	%	No.	%
2024	10,490	60.71%	6,493	37.58%	295	1.71%
2020	10,398	58.53%	7,096	39.94%	271	1.53%
2016	9,412	62.67%	5,092	33.90%	515	3.43%
2012	8,855	63.40%	4,954	35.47%	158	1.13%
2008	9,243	61.53%	5,607	37.33%	172	1.14%
2004	9,434	64.73%	5,013	34.39%	128	0.88%
2000	7,511	58.62%	4,769	37.22%	532	4.15%
1996	5,379	50.43%	4,054	38.01%	1,233	11.56%
1992	5,161	52.30%	2,664	26.99%	2,044	20.71%

As of March 2011, there were a total of 18,809 registered voters in Wall Township, of which 3,256 (17.3%) were registered as Democrats, 6,373 (33.9%) were registered as Republicans and 9,171 (48.8%) were registered as Unaffiliated. There were 9 voters registered as Libertarians or Greens.

In the 2012 presidential election, Republican Mitt Romney received 63.4% of the vote (8,855 cast), ahead of Democrat Barack Obama with 35.5% (4,954 votes), and other candidates with 1.1% (158 votes), among the 14,062 ballots cast by the township's 19,604 registered voters (95 ballots were spoiled), for a turnout of 71.7%. In the 2008 presidential election, Republican John McCain received 60.7% of the vote (9,243 cast), ahead of Democrat Barack Obama with 36.9% (5,607 votes) and other candidates with 1.1% (172 votes), among the 15,215 ballots cast by the township's 19,601 registered voters, for a turnout of 77.6%. In the 2004 presidential election, Republican George W. Bush received 64.4% of the vote (9,434 ballots cast), outpolling Democrat John Kerry with 34.2% (5,013 votes) and other candidates with 0.7% (128 votes), among the 14,648 ballots cast by the township's 18,748 registered voters, for a turnout percentage of 78.1.

Gubernatorial election results for Wall Township
Year	Republican		Democratic		Third party(ies)	
Year	No.	%	No.	%	No.	%
2025	8,778	61.18%	5,507	38.38%	62	0.43%
2021	8,186	67.70%	3,825	31.64%	80	0.66%
2017	6,011	64.76%	3,093	33.32%	178	1.92%
2013	7,109	76.72%	1,977	21.34%	180	1.94%
2009	7,695	70.45%	2,542	23.27%	685	6.27%
2005	6,212	61.97%	3,419	34.10%	394	3.93%

In the 2013 gubernatorial election, Republican Chris Christie received 76.7% of the vote (7,109 cast), ahead of Democrat Barbara Buono with 21.3% (1,977 votes), and other candidates with 1.9% (180 votes), among the 9,400 ballots cast by the township's 19,569 registered voters (134 ballots were spoiled), for a turnout of 48.0%. In the 2009 gubernatorial election, Republican Chris Christie received 70.0% of the vote (7,695 ballots cast), ahead of Democrat Jon Corzine with 23.1% (2,542 votes), Independent Chris Daggett with 5.5% (604 votes) and other candidates with 0.7% (81 votes), among the 10,994 ballots cast by the township's 19,085 registered voters, yielding a 57.6% turnout.

United States Senate election results for Wall Township1
Year	Republican		Democratic		Third party(ies)	
Year	No.	%	No.	%	No.	%
2024	10,123	61.11%	6,152	37.14%	290	1.75%
2018	7,892	63.81%	3,937	31.83%	539	4.36%
2012	8,417	63.92%	4,553	34.58%	198	1.50%
2006	6,038	64.29%	3,129	33.32%	225	2.40%

United States Senate election results for Wall Township2
Year	Republican		Democratic		Third party(ies)	
Year	No.	%	No.	%	No.	%
2020	10,549	60.19%	6,655	37.97%	322	1.84%
2014	4,896	64.41%	2,512	33.05%	193	2.54%
2013	3,914	66.26%	1,960	33.18%	33	0.56%
2008	9,027	64.42%	4,730	33.75%	256	1.83%

== Education ==
The Wall Township Public Schools serve students in pre-kindergarten through twelfth grade. As of the 2024–25 school year, the district, comprised of seven schools, had an enrollment of 3,215 students and 347.3 classroom teachers (on an FTE basis), for a student–teacher ratio of 9.3:1. Schools in the district (with 2024–25 enrollment data from the National Center for Education Statistics) are Wall Primary School with 73 students in grades PreK, Allenwood Elementary School with 381 students in grades K–5, Central Elementary School with 494 students in grades K–5, Old Mill Elementary School with 396 students in grades K–5, West Belmar Elementary School with 171 students in grades K–5, Wall Intermediate School with 755 students in grades 6–8 and Wall High School with 924 students in grades 9–12.

== Historic district ==
Allaire Village is a living history museum located in Allaire State Park. The property was initially a Native American ceremonial ground prior to 1650, by 1750 a sawmill had been established on the property by Issac Palmer. The village was later established as a bog iron furnace originally known as Williamsburg Forge 'Monmouth Furnace' was then renamed the Howell Works by Benjamin B. Howell. In 1822, it was then purchased by philanthropist James P. Allaire, who endeavoured to turn into a self-contained community. The wood burning furnace business collapsed in 1846 and the village closed. During its height in the mid 19th century, the community supported about 500 people and was a bustling mill town.

The Allaire Village was Dedicated as a State Park in June 1957 and officially reopened by Governor Robert B. Meyner on May 24, 1958. The museum was established through the efforts of the New Jersey State Federation of Woman's Clubs in 1958. Although the restoration of the Village is not yet complete, the buildings that remain, the interpretive programs based on a multitude of available primary records, and even the landscape make Allaire Village a rare resource. Through them, visitors are able to experience and better understand the forces that shaped New Jersey's industrial power in the early-mid 19th century.

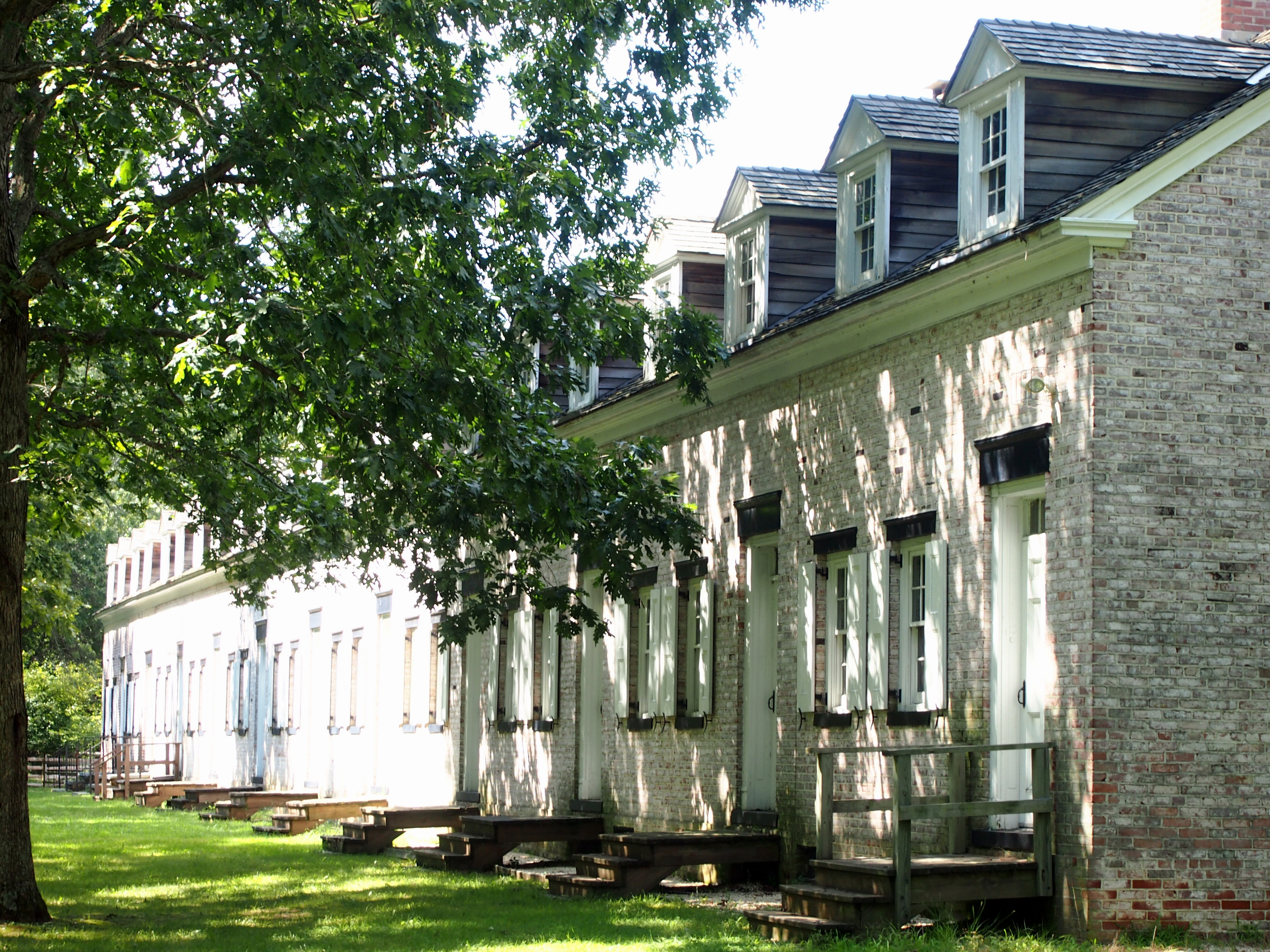
Rowhouses

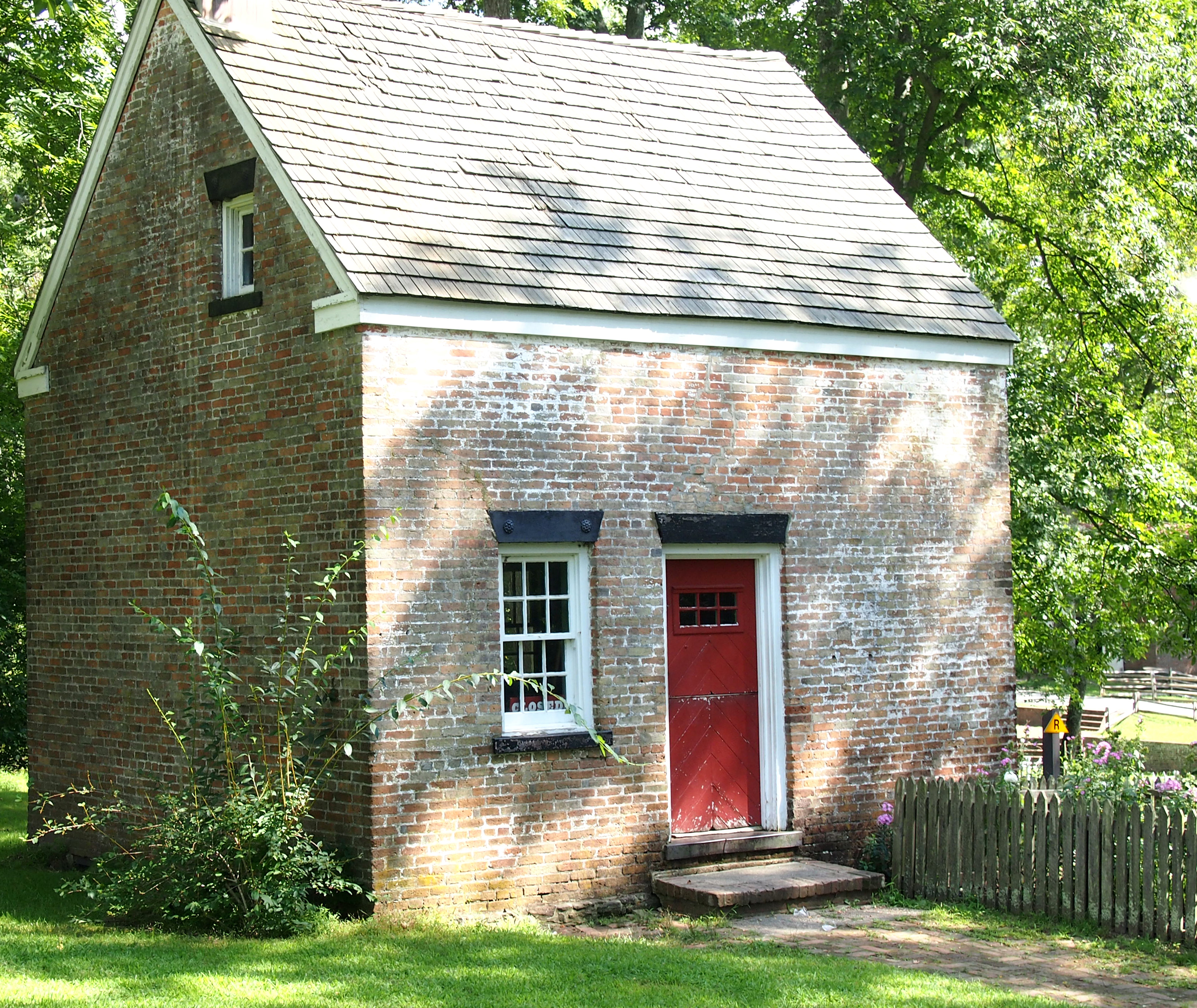
Foreman's Cottage

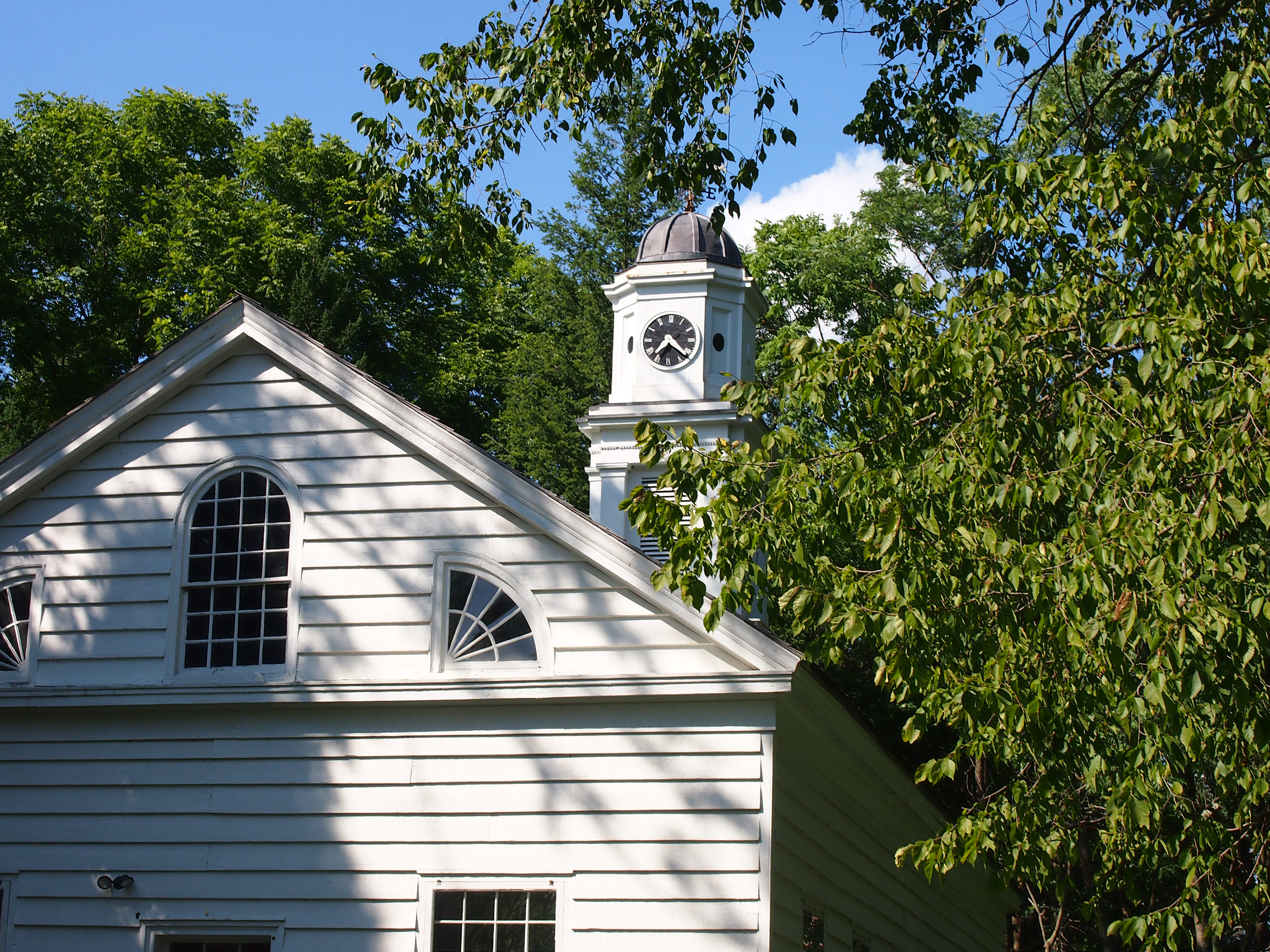
Christ Church Chapel

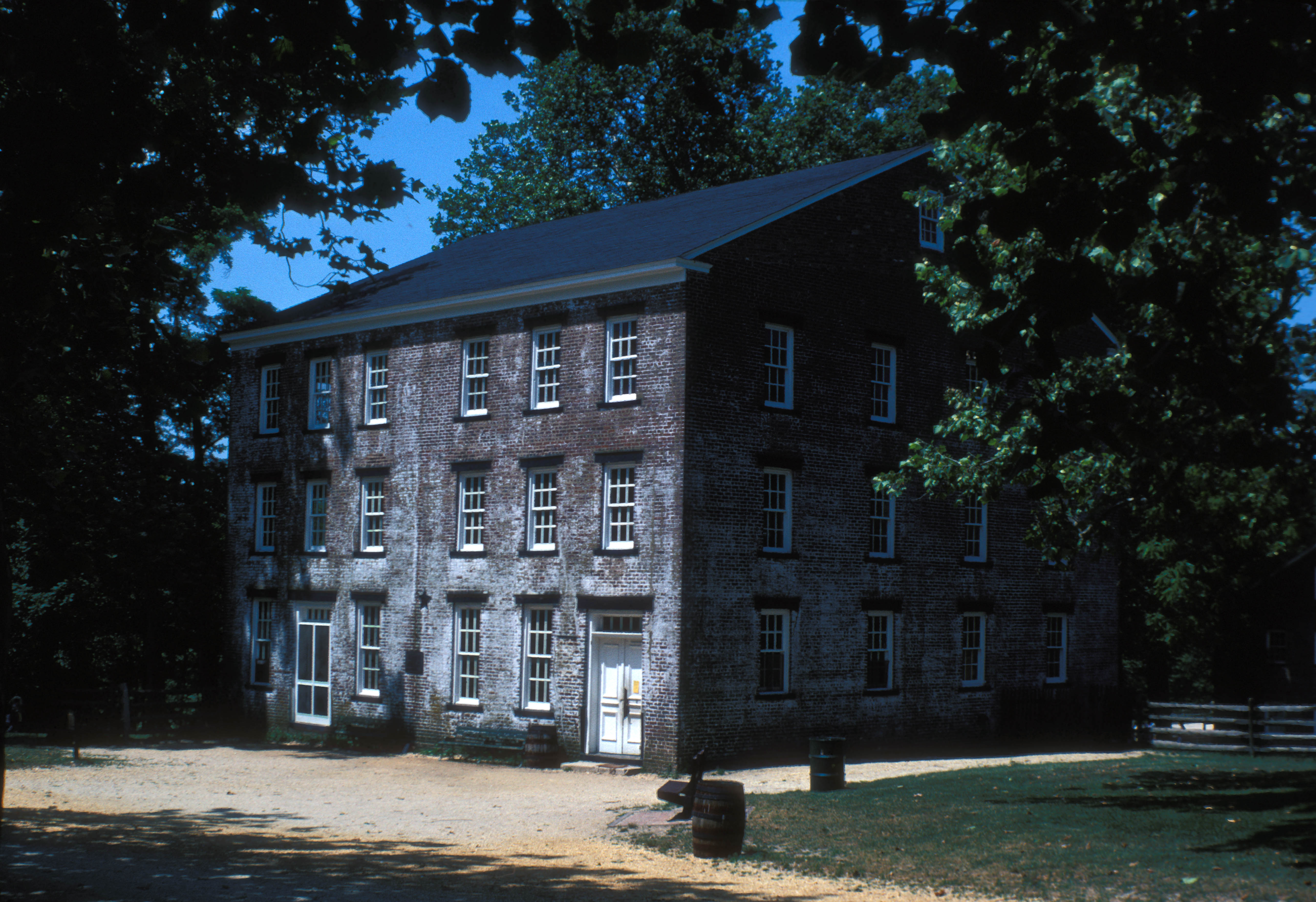
General Store

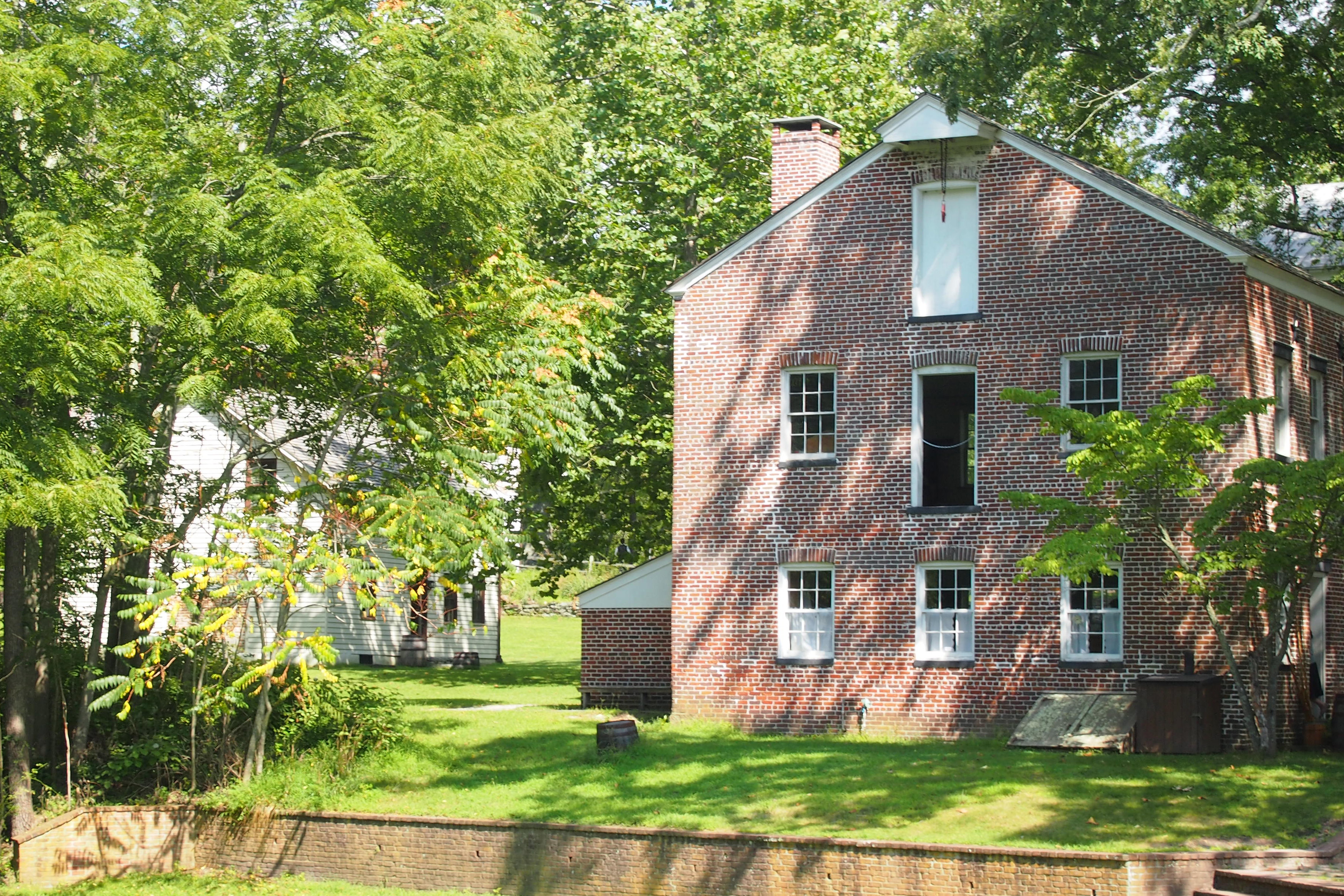
Howell Works Bakery and Managers House

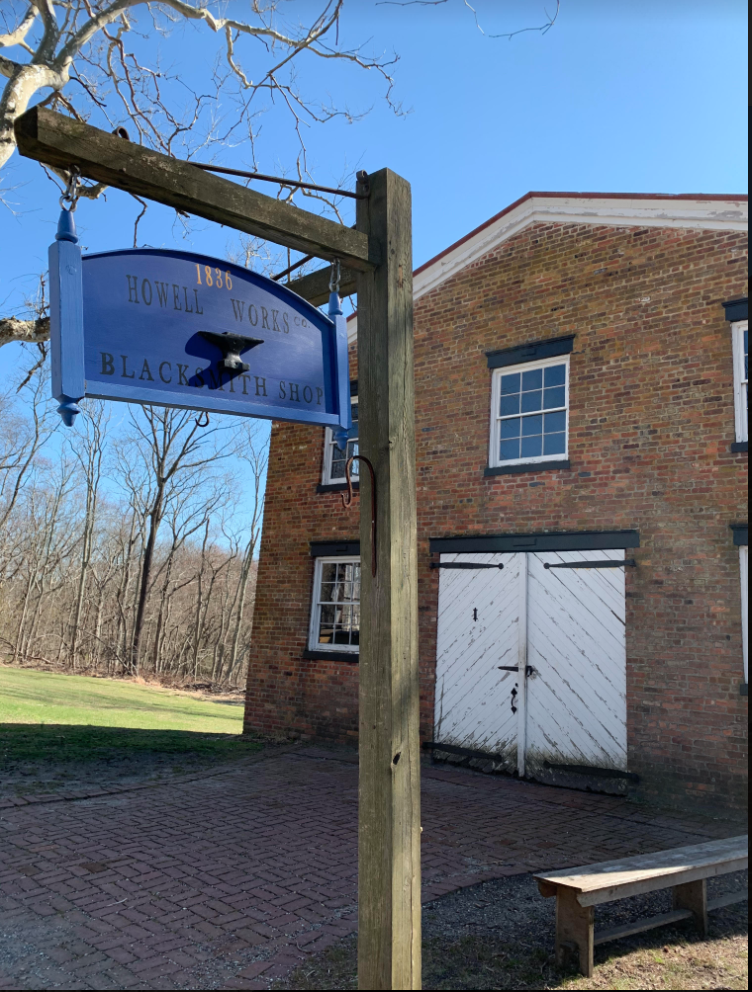
Howell Works Blacksmith Shop

== Infrastructure ==
=== Public safety ===
==== Law enforcement ====
The Wall Township Police Department, consisting of approximately 68 sworn officers, provides primary law enforcement services for the township from their headquarters at 2700 Allaire Road.

==== Fire protection ====
Wall Township is served by three fire districts. Wall Fire Company # 1 (52–1), the first volunteer fire company to serve the township, and known for years as the West Belmar Fire Company, was created in December 1909. Today this company remains all volunteer and serves the residents of the West Belmar section of town, also known as Wall Fire District No. 1. The headquarters station is located at 1511 18th Avenue, while the original 1910 fire station located at 1619 State Highway 71 is still in service as a satellite station. Glendola Fire Company (52–2), also known as Wall Fire District No. 2, was formed in May 1931. Their headquarters station is located at 3404 Belmar Boulevard. South Wall Fire-Rescue (52–3), protecting Wall Fire District No. 3, was established in 1946. Headquartered at 2605 Atlantic Avenue, South Wall responds to calls for service in the south end of town.

Fire inspection services for the entire township are provided by Wall Fire District No. 1 through the Fire Prevention Bureau. The fire marshal's office is located at 2700 Allaire Road.

==== Emergency medical services ====
Wall Township is served by three first aid squads. Wall First Aid was formed in September 1939 and is known as Wall Township First Aid & Rescue Squad (52–21). Their station is located at 1900 Monmouth Boulevard, just off State Route 18. Wall Community First Aid Squad (52–22) was established on November 15, 1960. They operate from 1417 Lakewood Road, and primarily respond to the south end of the township. The Wall Township Police Department established a paid EMS squad (52–23) in 1999 to supplement the volunteer squads during the weekday daytime hours when they were prone to manpower shortages. Wall EMS continues to be operated as part of the Wall Township Police Department.

=== Transportation ===
==== Roads and highways ====
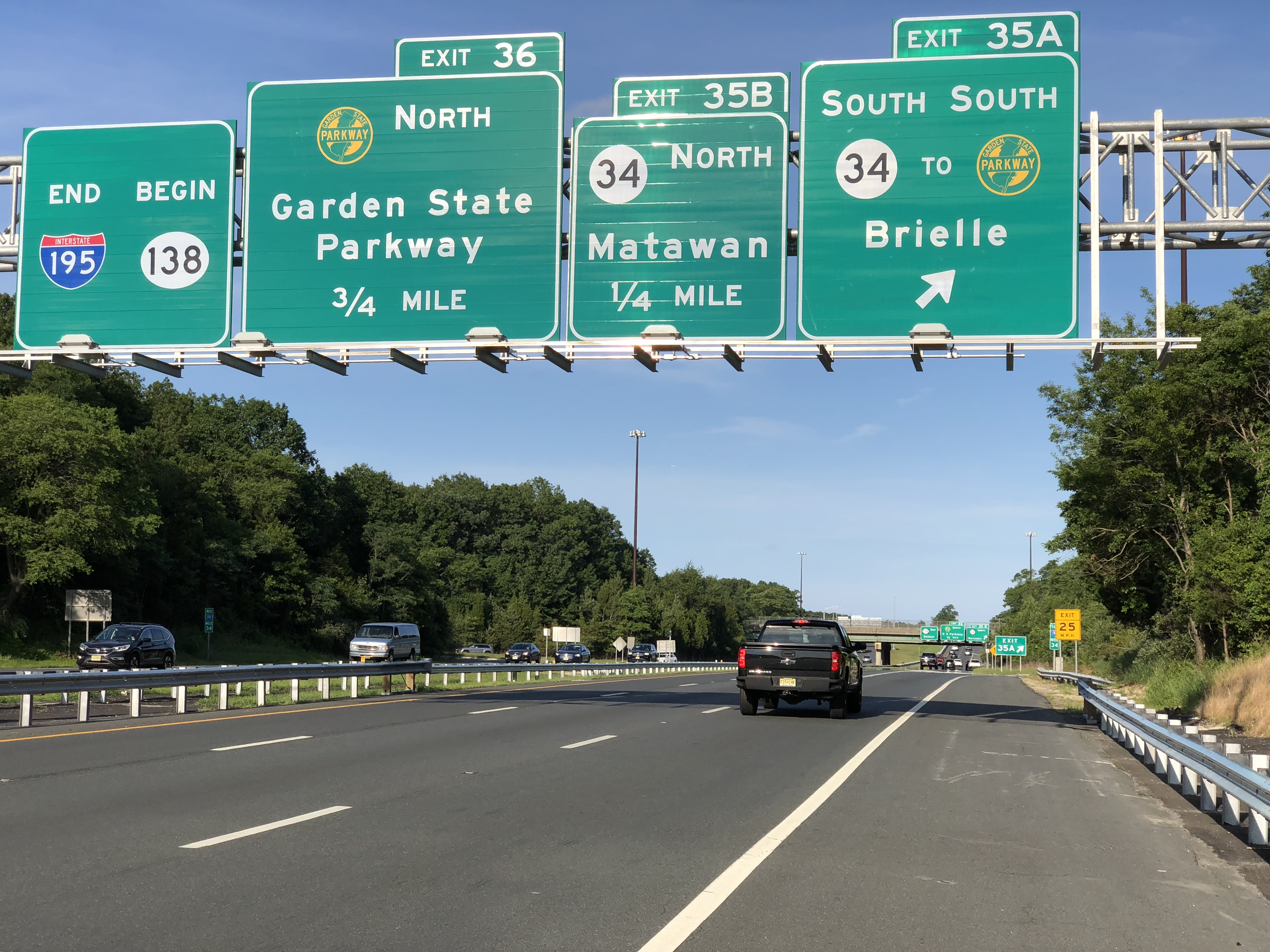
The junction of Interstate 195, Route 138, Route 34 and the Garden State Parkway in Wall Township

A major transportation hub for Central Jersey, Wall Township is crisscrossed by several major highways that travel throughout the state. As of May 2010, the township had a total of 200.26 miles (322.29 km) of roadways, of which 146.03 miles (235.01 km) were maintained by the municipality, 24.91 miles (40.09 km) by Monmouth County and 22.78 miles (36.66 km) by the New Jersey Department of Transportation and 6.54 miles (10.53 km) by the New Jersey Turnpike Authority.

Two major limited-access highways run through Wall Township: the Garden State Parkway (including interchange 98 for Belmar / Wall) and Interstate 195, which ends at Route 34 and continues as Route 138. Several state routes also pass through the township, including Route 18, which begins at a partial-cloverleaf interchange with Route 138, Route 33, Route 34 (with its southern terminus at the interchange of Routes 35 and 70), Route 35, Route 70 (which has its eastern terminus at Route 34 and continues towards the east as Route 35), and Route 71.

Major county roads that traverse through the township include CR 524, CR 547 and CR 549.

==== Public transportation ====
Monmouth Executive Airport
- IATA: BLM; ICAO: KBLM; FAA LID: BLM

Summary
- Airport type: Public use
- Owner: Wall Herald Corp.
- Serves: Belmar / Farmingdale
- Location: Wall Township, Monmouth County, New Jersey
- Elevation AMSL: 153 ft (47 m)

Map
- Location in Monmouth County / New Jersey / US BLM (New Jersey) BLM (the United States)

Runways
Direction	Length		Surface
Direction	ft	m	Surface
14/32	7,371	2,247	Asphalt
3/21	3,512	1,070	Asphalt

Statistics (2010)
- Aircraft operations: 57,229
- Source: Federal Aviation Administration

===== Bus =====
Bus service is available from the Garden State Parkway to the Financial District in Lower Manhattan via the Academy Bus Line. Monmouth Park & Ride is located in the township off of the Garden State Parkway at mile marker 100. It is an express route to New York City during peak rush-hour.

NJ Transit bus service is available between the township and Philadelphia on the 317 route, with local service offered on the 830 and 836 routes.

===== Rail =====
NJ Transit offers passenger train service at stations at Belmar, Manasquan and Spring Lake. Commuter service is provided on the North Jersey Coast Line, offering express and local service. Diesel service operates from Hoboken Terminal to Bay Head station. Electric service operates from New York Penn Station to Long Branch station, where the electrified portion of the line ends. Mid-line stations include Newark Penn Station, Newark Liberty International Airport Station and Secaucus Junction.

===== Aviation =====
Monmouth Executive Airport, which is located in the township (despite having a Farmingdale address), offers short-distance flights for private jets to surrounding areas. From 1966 to 1981 the airport was the base of Monmouth Airlines, later Ocean Airways, a commuter airline with scheduled flights to airports including Newark, Kennedy and Washington National. The next nearest major commercial airports are Trenton-Mercer Airport, which serves several domestic destinations via Frontier Airlines and located 35 miles (56 km) west (about 43 minutes drive); and Newark Liberty International Airport, which serves as a major hub for United Airlines and located 40 miles (64 km) north (about 55 minutes drive) from the center of Wall Township.

=== Healthcare ===
Jersey Shore University Medical Center is a 691-bed non-profit, tertiary research and academic medical center located in neighboring Neptune Township as part of the Hackensack Meridian Health system, serving the northern Jersey Shore region.

=== Telecommunications ===
Wall Township is served by area codes 732 and 848 (for landlines and cell phones) and 908 (for cell phones). The township is a major landing point for multiple transatlantic subsea cables, including Havfrue AEC-2, Seaborn Networks' Seabras-1, and TGN Atlantic's TGN1 and TGN2.

== Notable people ==
People who were born in, residents of, or otherwise closely associated with Wall Township include:

- James Peter Allaire (1785–1858), master mechanic and steam engine builder, and founder of Allaire Iron Works (est. 1815), the first steam engine company in New York City, and later Howell Works
- Dara Brown (born c. 1965), news anchor and actress
- Kim Clijsters (born 1983), retired professional tennis player (and wife of Brian Lynch)
- George B. Cooper (1808–1866), politician who was elected to the United States House of Representatives in 1858, but left office after a year when Congress awarded the seat to his opponent in 1860
- Peter Criss (born 1945), musician with the band Kiss
- Ashley Alexandra Dupré (born 1985 as Ashley Youmans), "high end call girl" whose dalliance with New York State Governor Eliot Spitzer led to his resignation
- Dean Ehehalt (born 1964), head coach of the Monmouth Hawks baseball team
- Theodore Fields, politician who served as a freeholder, and as sheriff of Monmouth County
- Fletcher (born 1994), singer-songwriter known for her single "Undrunk"
- George Gelnovatch (born 1965), men's head soccer coach, University of Virginia, and former professional soccer player
- Deborah Gramiccioni, attorney who worked in the administration of Governor Chris Christie and as the deputy executive director of the Port Authority of New York and New Jersey
- Emily Grove (born 1991), singer-songwriter and musician
- Suzy Hansen (born 1978), writer, whose book Notes on a Foreign Country: An American Abroad in a Post-America World was a finalist for the 2018 Pulitzer Prize for General Nonfiction
- Gary Hindley (born 1947), soccer coach
- Tom Kain (born 1963), 1984 U.S. Olympic Soccer Team, top-rated college player in the country at Duke University, four-time All American
- Sean T. Kean (born 1963), politician who represents the 30th legislative district in the New Jersey General Assembly, served on the Wall Township Planning Board from 2001 to 2002
- Brian Lynch (born 1978), retired professional basketball player and current coach (and husband of Kim Clijsters)
- Guglielmo Marconi (1874–1937), radio pioneer
- Gil McDougald (1928–2010), infielder who played for the New York Yankees
- Jessica Poland (born 1988), musician formerly signed to Geffen Records who performs under the stage name Charlotte Sometimes, who was a contestant on season 2 of The Voice
- Dan Prestup (born 1984), World's Fastest Drummer winner
- Nicholas Reale (1922–1984), watercolorist with a lengthy career in art and teaching
- Dave Rible (born 1967), politician who has served in the New Jersey General Assembly since 2008
- Ed Sadowski (1917–1990), professional basketball player
- Athanasios Scheidt (born 1998), soccer player who plays as a midfielder for Polish club Radomiak Radom
- Rusty Schweickart (born 1935), Apollo 9 astronaut who was the first lunar module pilot
- Richard J. Sullivan, engineer, political appointee and environmentalist who was the first Commissioner of the New Jersey Department of Environmental Protection
- Ned Thomson (born 1953), politician who has represented the 30th Legislative District in the New Jersey General Assembly since 2017
- F. Paul Wilson (born 1946), author
- Tim Wright (born 1990), football player for the Detroit Lions and Super Bowl XLIX champion
