= Allenwood, New Jersey =

Populated place in Monmouth County, New Jersey, US

- Census-designated place
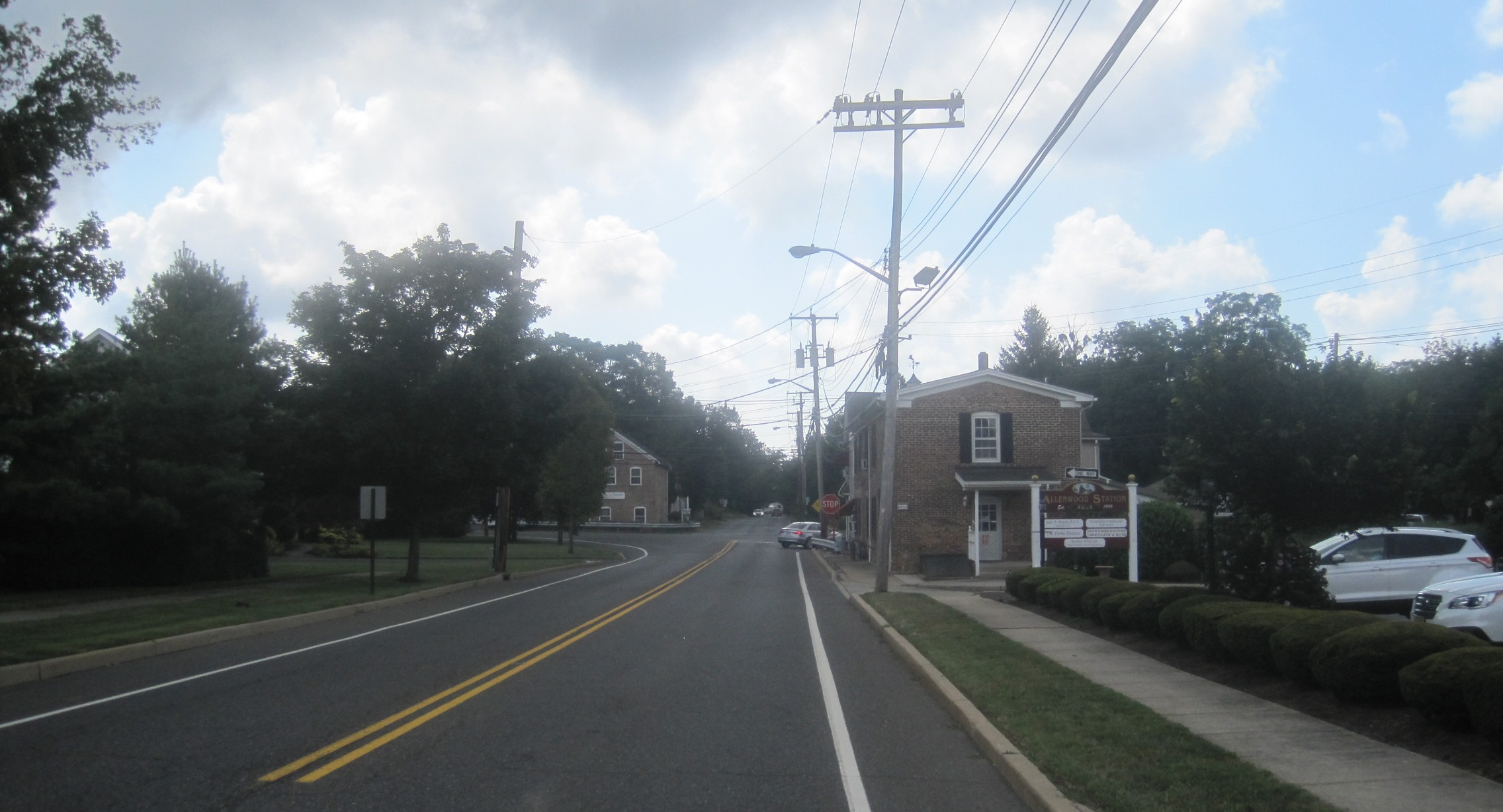
- Center of Allenwood

- Map of Allenwood CDP in Monmouth County. Inset: Location of Monmouth County in New Jersey.

- Location in Monmouth County Location in New Jersey Location in the United States
- Coordinates: 40.135366°N 74.09805°W
- Country: United States
- State: New Jersey
- County: Monmouth
- Township: Wall

Area
  - Total: 1.86 sq mi (4.83 km^{2})
  - Land: 1.75 sq mi (4.52 km^{2})
  - Water: 0.12 sq mi (0.31 km^{2}) 6.24%
- Elevation: 33 ft (10 m)

Population (2020)
  - Total: 954
  - Density: 546.7/sq mi (211.07/km^{2})
- Time zone: UTC−05:00 (Eastern (EST))
  - Summer (DST): UTC−04:00 (Eastern (EDT))
- ZIP Code: 08720
- Area codes: 732/848
- FIPS code: 34-00790
- GNIS feature ID: 02389124

Allenwood is an unincorporated community and census-designated place (CDP) in Wall Township, Monmouth County, New Jersey, United States. As of the 2020 United States census, the CDP's population was 954.

== Geography ==
Allenwood is in southeastern Monmouth County, in the southern part of Wall Township. The community has a roughly triangular shape, with the northeastern side following New Jersey Route 34 and the northwest one following the Garden State Parkway. The two highways intersect at the northern tip of Allenwood. The southern border of the community mostly follows the Ocean County border, with a portion of it following the Manasquan River. Point Pleasant Beach on the Atlantic Ocean is 5 miles (8 km) to the southeast via NJ 34.

According to the U.S. Census Bureau, the Allenwood CDP has a total area of 1.86 square miles (4.82 km^{2}), including 1.75 square miles (4.53 km^{2}) of land and 0.12 square miles (0.31 km^{2}) of water (6.38%).

== Demographics ==
Historical population
Census	Pop.	Note	%±
2000	935		—
2010	925		−1.1%
2020	954		3.1%
Population sources: 2000-2010 2000 2010 2020

Allenwood first appeared as a census designated place in the 2000 U.S. census.

=== 2020 census ===
Allenwood CDP, New Jersey – Racial and ethnic composition Note: the US Census treats Hispanic/Latino as an ethnic category. This table excludes Latinos from the racial categories and assigns them to a separate category. Hispanics/Latinos may be of any race.
Race / Ethnicity (NH = Non-Hispanic)	Pop 2000	Pop 2010	Pop 2020	% 2000	% 2010	% 2020
White alone (NH)	899	884	877	96.15%	95.57%	91.93%
Black or African American alone (NH)	0	1	2	0.00%	0.11%	0.21%
Native American or Alaska Native alone (NH)	1	0	0	0.11%	0.00%	0.00%
Asian alone (NH)	14	8	11	1.50%	0.86%	1.15%
Native Hawaiian or Pacific Islander alone (NH)	0	0	0	0.00%	0.00%	0.00%
Other race alone (NH)	0	0	1	0.00%	0.00%	0.10%
Mixed race or Multiracial (NH)	5	6	32	0.53%	0.65%	3.35%
Hispanic or Latino (any race)	16	26	31	1.71%	2.81%	3.25%
Total	935	925	954	100.00%	100.00%	100.00%

=== 2010 census ===
The 2010 United States census counted 925 people, 309 households, and 259 families in the CDP. The population density was 534.0 people per square mile (206.2 people/km^{2}). There were 318 housing units at an average density of 183.6 units per square mile (70.9 units/km^{2}). The racial makeup was 97.73% (904) White, 0.11% (1) Black or African American, 0.00% (0) Native American, 0.86% (8) Asian, 0.00% (0) Pacific Islander, 0.43% (4) from other races, and 0.86% (8) from two or more races. Hispanic or Latino of any race were 2.81% (26) of the population.

Of the 309 households, 36.9% had children under the age of 18; 75.1% were married couples living together; 5.8% had a female householder with no husband present and 16.2% were non-families. Of all households, 12.9% were made up of individuals and 6.8% had someone living alone who was 65 years of age or older. The average household size was 2.99 and the average family size was 3.30.

26.2% of the population were under the age of 18, 7.7% from 18 to 24, 17.5% from 25 to 44, 36.6% from 45 to 64, and 12.0% who were 65 years of age or older. The median age was 44.3 years. For every 100 females, the population had 102.4 males. For every 100 females ages 18 and older there were 96.8 males.

=== 2000 census ===
As of the 2000 United States census there were 935 people, 309 households, and 261 families living in the CDP. The population density was 199.5 people/km^{2} (517 people/mi^{2}). There were 318 housing units at an average density of 67.8 units/km^{2} (176 units/mi^{2}). The racial makeup of the CDP was 97.75% White, 0.11% Native American, 1.50% Asian, 0.11% from other races, and 0.53% from two or more races. Hispanic or Latino of any race were 1.71% of the population.

There were 309 households, out of which 47.2% had children under the age of 18 living with them, 77.7% were married couples living together, 4.2% had a female householder with no husband present, and 15.5% were non-families. 13.6% of all households were made up of individuals, and 4.5% had someone living alone who was 65 years of age or older. The average household size was 3.03 and the average family size was 3.36.

In the CDP the population was spread out, with 30.8% under the age of 18, 5.0% from 18 to 24, 26.2% from 25 to 44, 28.2% from 45 to 64, and 9.7% who were 65 years of age or older. The median age was 40 years. For every 100 females, there were 109.2 males. For every 100 females age 18 and over, there were 102.2 males.

The median income for a household in the CDP was $117,071, and the median income for a family was $120,472. Males had a median income of $61,985 versus $47,500 for females. The per capita income for the CDP was $40,148. None of the population or families were below the poverty line.
