= Emily Grove (singer) =

American singer-songwriter

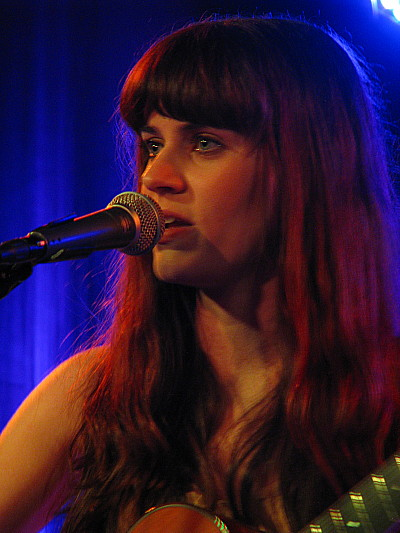
- Emily Grove on stage at The Saint, Asbury Park, NJ in June 2014

Background information
- Born: August 1, 1991 (age 34); Wall, New Jersey, US
- Origin: Wall, New Jersey, US
- Genres: Alternative country, folk
- Occupations: Musician, songwriter
- Instruments: Guitar, vocals
- Years active: 1999–present
- Website: www.facebook.com/pages/Emily-Grove/218656865435

Emily Grove (born August 1, 1991) is an American singer-songwriter and musician from Wall, New Jersey. Her sound has been described as alternative folk. Emily Grove is active in the Asbury Park music scene in Monmouth County, New Jersey. Emily Grove was the recipient of the 2011 and 2012 Asbury Music Awards for Best Female Acoustic Act, and 2011 and 2012 Jersey Acoustic Music Awards for Top Female Vocalist and Top Female Songwriter. She has played with and opened for Glen Burtnik, Willie Nile, Ari Hest, Rhett Miller (Old 97s), Marshall Crenshaw, Dan Reed Network, and John Lefler (Dashboard Confessional). Grove has toured the UK and US opening for and playing with David Ford. Grove also performs in venues ranging from well known New Jersey music venues such as The Saint and the Stone Pony through music venues in New York City and Boston.

Grove's style has been described as blending the 1970s sounds of Carole King with the "orchestrated texture of The Band" and the John Prine. Her songs have been described as including elements of country and rock and roll blended with poetry. Regarding musical influences, Grove says that her parents listened to Johnny Cash, watched the country music stations, and listened to Americana music. Her mother loved Paul Simon, and she was named Emily named after the song "For Emily Whenever I May Find Her." Her father enjoyed the Rolling Stones and the Beatles. She was born on Jerry Garcia's birthday, which brought attention to the music of the Grateful Dead.

== Personal life ==
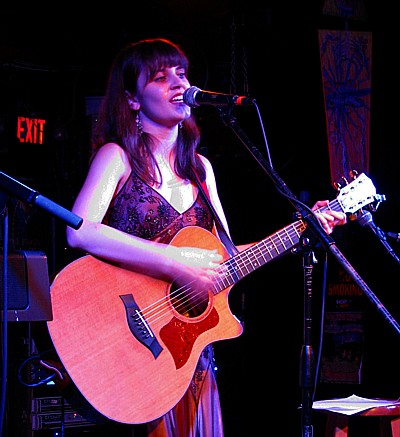
Emily Grove performing at The Saint in May 2011.

Groves, the daughter of an accountant and an electrician, grew up and still resides in Wall, New Jersey. She attended a Catholic grammar school She reports being shy as a child. She describes her neighborhood as close, so that everyone knew each other, and was respectful. She says that she formed great friendships there. Early on, her mother noticed that she like to sing and encouraged her to learn to play an instrument. She initially chose to learn the saxophone because she wanted to be like Lisa Simpson, but her mother suggested she try a different instrument. She chose the guitar next, because her coach suggested that she could then accompany herself and make a living. Groves continued to take lessons, and eventually was accepted into Berklee College of Music. Grove completed two years at Berklee before deciding to test her skills in the East Coast music scene.

== Discography ==
Her album, "Way Across the Sea" was produced by Jack Daley (Lenny Kravitz). The title track, "Way Across The Sea," describes her crush on an unnamed rock and roll star. "Falling" is described as reminiscent of the styles of Carly Simon and Carole King. "Today" was inspired by a particularly long Sopranos marathon. "Flea," the first song Grove ever wrote, is a folk song based on a poem by John Donne, and is consistent with the style of artists like Jane Wiedlin and Alanis Morissette. The album ends with, "Procrastination," done in the style of Natalie Merchant.

Her second album, released in 2014, "Life of a Commoner", was produced by Jason Rubal of Seventh Wave Studio (Amanda Palmer). Her vocals on "Spider" has been compared to the vocals of both Annie Haslam and Dolores O'Riordan. "Scream" combines a Nicole Atkins sound with R.E.M. energy. "The Call" tells a Janis Ian-like story. "Johnny Lee" is done in the style of a Celtic love song.

== Performances ==
In addition to the venues mentioned above, Grove has performed in the WBJB Songwriters in the Park and Songwriters at the Beach Concert Series. Recording are available through the station's web site. She also appeared on the Today Show with David Gray on June 12, 2014.
