= Howell Works =

- Type: Private
- Industry: Mining and manufacturing
- Founded: 1822
- Founder: James P. Allaire
- Defunct: 1850
- Headquarters: United States
- Products: Pig iron, cast iron products
- Owner: James P. Allaire
- Number of employees: 400-600 (1836)

Howell Works (later the Howell Works Company) was a bog iron-based production facility for pig iron which was established in New Jersey in the early 19th century by American engineer and philanthropist James P. Allaire. It is notable as one of the earliest American examples of a company town.

Allaire purchased the Howell Works property to provide pig iron for his Allaire Iron Works in New York, which was at the time a leading manufacturer of marine steam engines. The Howell Works also manufactured its own lines of cast iron products. Allaire eventually transformed the Howell Works into an almost completely self-sufficient community, with its own housing and food supply for the workforce, its own post office, church, school and company store, even its own currency.

After bog iron was made redundant by the increasing availability of iron ore, Allaire closed the Howell Works and eventually retired there with his family. The property remained in private hands until being bequeathed to the state in 1941. Today, the Howell Works is a registered historic site known as Allaire Village.

== Background ==
James Peter Allaire founded his first company, a brass foundry, at 462 Cherry Street, New York, in 1804. In 1807, Allaire received an order from steamboat pioneer Robert Fulton for brass fittings for the North River Steamboat, the world's first commercially successful steam-powered vessel. Allaire subsequently became interested in marine steam engine technology, and in 1815 he established a plant in New York for the production of such engines, the Allaire Iron Works.

Allaire soon ran into supply problems with his new ironworks. With little demand in the United States for the high quality pig iron necessary for building marine steam engines, the local pig iron industry was in its infancy and unable to supply him with either the quantity or quality he required. The best quality pig iron was imported from the United Kingdom, but high tariffs made it too expensive to purchase.

Allaire's solution was to become a manufacturer of pig iron. In 1821, a friend and business associate of Allaire's, Benjamin B. Howell, began leasing a bog-iron furnace in Monmouth County, New Jersey, which was known as Monmouth Furnace. After Howell informed Allaire of the property, Allaire decided to raise the capital to purchase it. On 27 April 1822, he purchased the furnace along with 5,000 acres (20 km^{2}) of the surrounding land from its owner William Newbold for the sum of $19,000. The purchase of the entire property was motivated by the availability of resources for iron-making as well as its proximity to a river passage to New York City.

Allaire's initial capital raising fell through and Newbold promptly sued for the balance, but Allaire was able to refinance. He took full possession of the property in 1823. He renamed the property Howell Works, in honor of Benjamin Howell.

== Operational period, 1822-1850 ==
The 5,000-acre (20 km^{2}) property purchased by Allaire contained a large swathe of swampland — from which the renewable resource of bog iron was harvested — along with forests to process for charcoal to fuel the bog iron conversion. Allaire eventually purchased an additional 3,000 acres (12 km^{2}) of woodland to increase the supply for charcoal making.

=== Workforce ===
The basic workforce was divided into three different groups:

- ore raisers for mining the bog iron from the swampland,
- woodchoppers and woodsetters for charcoal production, and
- furnace workers, who included casters and molders.

Because of the area's isolation, Allaire realized he had to provide virtually all the facilities of a small town to satisfy the daily needs of his employees. Consequently, he hired additional artisans: a blacksmith, carpenters, brickmakers to supply bricks for new buildings on the grounds, farmers to grow food and raise cattle, millers, bakers, butchers and so on. In effect, Allaire built an almost entirely self-contained community.

=== Financial restructure ===
In 1824, Allaire sold 50% of the Works to his brother-in-law John Haggerty, who in turn sold his share of the business in 1827 to Thomas P. Wallworth. Allaire and Wallworth incorporated the business in 1828 as the Howell Works Company, with a capital of $150,000. By 1833, Allaire was the sole owner once again.

=== Post office and company scrip ===
Howell Works Company $1 note

Company tokens

In 1831, the Howell Works secured a US Postal contract and opened its own Post Office. In the same year, the New Jersey Legislature passed an act prohibiting the use of "tickets" - in effect, banning the use of currencies other than the state's official currency. Allaire had been planning to issue his own scrip prior to passage of the act. In 1832, he initiated a test case.

The courts found that the Allaire scrip did not violate the Act because they were "due bills" (IOU's). Allaire began issuing his workers the scrip, which was redeemable at the company store on the grounds, as well as accepted as payment by businesses in the local area. The scrip was issued in a variety of denominations, from tokens worth a few pennies to notes with a value of between $1 and $10.

=== Transportation hub ===
As Allaire's business grew, Howell Works became a major transportation center. In 1833 Allaire upgraded the original wooden carriage house, built in 1825, with a larger brick building. He established a stagecoach company that ran a freight-wagon line between Howell Works and his depot at Eatontown Dock (modern-day Oceanport). Later he built another depot at Red Bank further north. To transport the pig iron from Red Bank to New York, Allaire purchased Cornelius Vanderbilt's steamer Bellona and established the first regular steam packet service between the two localities. Other steamboats used by Allaire to transport goods and supplies to and from the Howell Works included the Frank, David Brown, Osiris, Iolas and Orus.

=== Company store ===
Allaire expanded the Howell Works Company Store in 1835 by constructing a new four-story brick building at a cost of $7,000 to house the steadily expanding range of goods for sale. The Store's goods included meat, fish and dairy products stored in the basement; hardware, flour, coffee, wine, liquor, groceries, ironware and other goods on the ground floor; and a wide range of furniture to suit buyers of different means on the second floor. The top floor held bulk items and was also used a storage area. The Store also contained the Howell Works Post Office, an apothecary, and an early example of a soda fountain. Customers came from miles around to shop there. At this time, the Store may have been the largest in the entire state of New Jersey.

=== Philanthropy ===
Allaire was not only interested in the physical wellbeing of his employees. In 1832, he built a church on the Howell Works grounds. The Church was Episcopal in keeping with Allaire's personal faith; however, he was tolerant of other faiths and did not require his employees to attend services.

A strong believer in education, Allaire did require the children of his employees to attend school, which he provided free of charge. Lessons were held three days a week, from dawn to dusk, for children of both sexes between the ages of about five or six to eleven or twelve. Children old enough to train as apprentices could continue their schooling on a part-time basis if they so desired. Lessons were held inside the chapel and provided by the resident minister—retained by Allaire at a salary of $500 per year—and an assistant.

=== Peak period ===
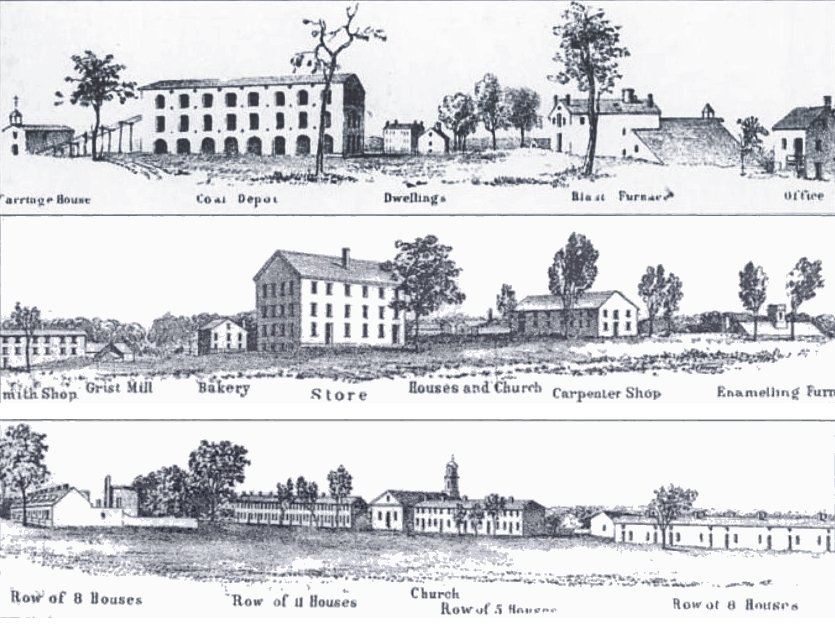
Panoramic view of Howell Works, 1853, showing coal depot and furnace at top, store and other buildings center, and residential buildings at bottom.

By 1836, Howell Works had expanded to its peak operation and size. By this time, the Works employed 400 to 600 workers, including not only those who lived in the Works community but many people from the surrounding region. The Works had expanded to over sixty buildings, including a large three-storey charcoal depot storing charcoal, bog iron and flux; the company store and the church; a carriage house and stables; a bakery, gristmill and slaughterhouse; a blacksmith, carpentry shop and wheelwright; an enamelling furnace; numerous row houses for married employees; and finally Allaire's mansion, which included a dormitory wing for the Works bachelors, managed by a housekeeper.

The blast furnace now included two smaller furnaces or cupolas in addition to the main furnace, all of which were housed in a large casting shed and adjoined by an office, bridgehouse and wheelhouse (the latter containing a large waterwheel to pump air into the furnace). The cupolas were added for the production of cast-iron products, which Allaire was able to manufacture as a result of the surplus pig iron from the Works. His company manufactured items including pots, pans, skillets, kettles and other holloware; along with andirons, pipes, tools and machine castings. Some of these items were sold at the company store, but most were shipped north for sale in New York. Allaire established file and screw factories, the latter of which manufactured the first screws made on mechanical lathes.

=== Decline and closure ===
At the peak of Howell Works' production, however, Allaire's business empire suffered a series of financial and other setbacks from which it would never fully recover. In October 1836, his steamship the William Gibbons ran aground and was destroyed. In May of the following year, the Panic of 1837 began, triggering a prolonged recession throughout the United States. At about the same time, the Howell Works furnace blew out. The loss of the William Gibbons, along with difficulties in obtaining loans and the loss of product demand caused by the Panic, prevented the Works from returning to full production for two years.

Allaire was unable to obtain loans to take possession of his latest steamship, Home, for more than a year after its construction. Soon after he did so, Home sailed only a few voyages before foundering and sinking off North Carolina in October 1837. One hundred people died and the ship was uninsured. The accident cost Allaire $89,708, but his reputation suffered more because of the loss of life.

Howell Works was rendered redundant by the discovery in the early 1830s of abundant deposits of iron ore and anthracite coal in the state of Pennsylvania. Pennsylvanian pig iron was cheaper to produce than that of the Works. As coal burns hotter than charcoal, the iron was processed to higher quality. The Howell Works furnace was extinguished for the last time in 1846. Some operations continued until about 1850, when the Works was formally declared bankrupt.

== Later history ==
Entrance to the "deserted village" of Howell Works Company, c. 1905

In 1850, James Allaire was forced out of the management of the Allaire Iron Works in New York by his erstwhile business partners, and retired with his second wife Calicia and their only son Hal to the former Howell Works property. By 1854, there were only ten employees working at Howell Works. After Allaire's death in 1858, ownership of the property passed first to his wife and later to their son Hal.

Hal Allaire lived as something of a recluse, leaving the property largely unchanged but lacking the funds to fully maintain it. As the derelict buildings gradually fell into disrepair, locals dubbed the location "Deserted Village".

After Hal Allaire's death in 1901, the property was purchased by W. J. Harrison. Harrison sold it in 1907 to Arthur Brisbane, then the world's wealthiest journalist, for the sum of $68,000. Brisbane leased the Deserted Village to the Monmouth Council of Boy Scouts for twenty years. Following Brisbane's death in 1936, his widow bequeathed the property's 10,000 acres (40 km^{2}) to the State in 1941, in accordance with her late husband's wishes. It thereby became known as Allaire State Park.

In 1957, a group of locals established an organization for the restoration and maintenance of the old Howell Works Company site, which they renamed Allaire Village. The non-profit organization, Allaire Village Inc., runs the historic site in conjunction with the State of New Jersey as a tourist and educational facility. Some of the buildings are still in operation such as the bakery and the general store. The church in the village is also considered the only one in the state with its steeple built on the rear instead of the front.
