= Allaire State Park =

State park in New Jersey, United States

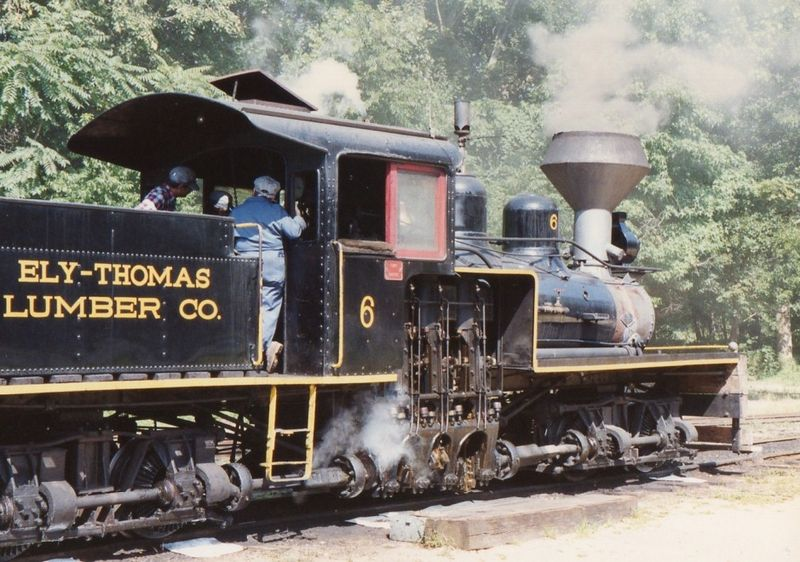
- Pine Creek Railroad at Allaire State Park

- Location within New Jersey Location within the United States
- Interactive map of Allaire State Park
- Location: Howell and Wall Township, New Jersey, United States
- Coordinates: 40°09′44″N 74°07′54″W
- Area: 3,205 acres (1,297 ha)
- Created: 1940
- Operator: New Jersey Division of Parks and Forestry
- Open: All year
- Website: Official website

Allaire State Park is a park located in Howell and in Wall Township in Monmouth County, New Jersey, United States, near the borough of Farmingdale, operated and maintained by the New Jersey Division of Parks and Forestry and is part of the New Jersey Coastal Heritage Trail Route. The park is known for its restored 19th century ironworks, Allaire Village, on the park premises. It is named after James P. Allaire, founder of the Howell Works at the same site. The park also hosts the Pine Creek Railroad, a tourist railroad.

The park, which is located in the coastal plain geographic region of New Jersey, is an example of podzolic soils. These soils are high in iron particle content and are fairly acidic.

Picnic facilities including charcoal grills, tables, playgrounds and sanitary facilities are available within the developed area of the park. The Manasquan River flows eastward through the park, seasonal canoe rentals are offered offsite by private vendors. The Manasquan River is classified as fresh water within the park and requires a fishing license. The park charges an entrance fee on weekends in the summer.

== Allaire Village ==
The park's signature feature is the Allaire Village, originally named Howell Works in the early 19th century. It was a prosperous industrial town producing pig iron and cast iron from the surrounding bog iron deposits. The buildings which remain and have been restored today include a general store, blacksmith shop, carpenter's shop, manager's house, foreman's house and a church. One of the workers' row house buildings has been recreated and now houses a Visitor Center and Museum (free). The historic village is run by a non-profit organization independent of the park and charges a nominal fee to enter the buildings.

== Pine Creek Railroad ==
The Pine Creek Railroad is an excursion rail line operated by railroad enthusiasts of the New Jersey Museum of Transportation. The museum, an independent not-for-profit organization, moved its locomotives and rolling stock to Allaire State Park in 1962 where it runs weekend trains on a ½ mile loop of track through the park. The physical rail line for the railroad was repurposed from a disused spur of track at a former rug company, 'A&M Karadheusian Rug Company' in Freehold, NJ. The Monmouth County Board of Freeholders sold the track for $1.00 to the museum for use at Allaire State Park.

The Pine Creek Railroad, like Allaire Village is an independent private organization operating within the park.

== Nature Interpretive Center ==
The Nature Interpretive Center currently operates weekends during the summer.

== Campground ==
The Allaire State Park family campground provides flush toilets, shower facilities, and a seasonal trailer sanitary dump station. The campground is open all year. Prices range from $20 a night for a regular tent site, to $30 for a yurt, and $40 for a shelter.

There are 45 tent and trailer sites with picnic tables available for guests with their own camping equipment. In addition there are four yurts (circular tents built on a wood deck), and six cabin-like shelters available for rent. There is also a group campground located on the south side of the park, which has an area with six large sites.

== Trails ==
- Nature Center Trail (Red)

An easy-to-moderate hiking/multi-use trail looping at a length of 1.5 miles (2.4 km).

- Canal Trail (Pink)

An easy hiking trail spanning 2.7 miles (4.3 km) with a loop at one end.

- Brisbane Trail (Orange)

An easy-to-moderate multi-use trail spanning 2.8 miles (4.5 km).

- Upper Squankum Trail (Yellow)

An easy-to-moderate multi-use trail spanning 2.2 miles (3.5 km) most of which is in the location of former Freehold and Jamesburg Agricultural Railroad tracks.

- Capital to Coast Trail (Purple)

A multi-use, paved section of the proposed Capital to the Coast Trail is located in Allaire state park spanning 2 miles (3.2 km) within the park, and spanning a distance of 7.1 miles (11.4 km) from the trailhead to the segment end in to Manasquan as the Edgar Felix Bikeway.

- Pine Trail (Orange)

A moderate multi-use trail spanning 4.5 miles (7.2 km).

- Mountain Laurel Trail (Blue)

An easy-to-moderate multi-use trail spanning 3 miles (4.8 km).

- Oak Trail (White)

An easy-to-moderate multi-use path spanning 2.6 miles (4.2 km) that splits off from the Pine Trail to become more difficult before joining the Mountain Laurel Trail.

- Boy Scout (Pink)

An easy-to-moderate multi-use trail spanning 1.3 miles (2.1 km) looping around the group camping sites.

All trail classifications and distances are made by the New Jersey Department of Environmental Protection, which oversees the State Parks. Note: Bicycles are not permitted on trails within the developed part of the park. Allaire's mountain biking trails may be accessed by riding the Edgar Felix Bikeway to Hospital road on the eastern edge of the park.
