= Allaire Village =

- U.S. National Register of Historic Places
- U.S. Historic district
- New Jersey Register of Historic Places
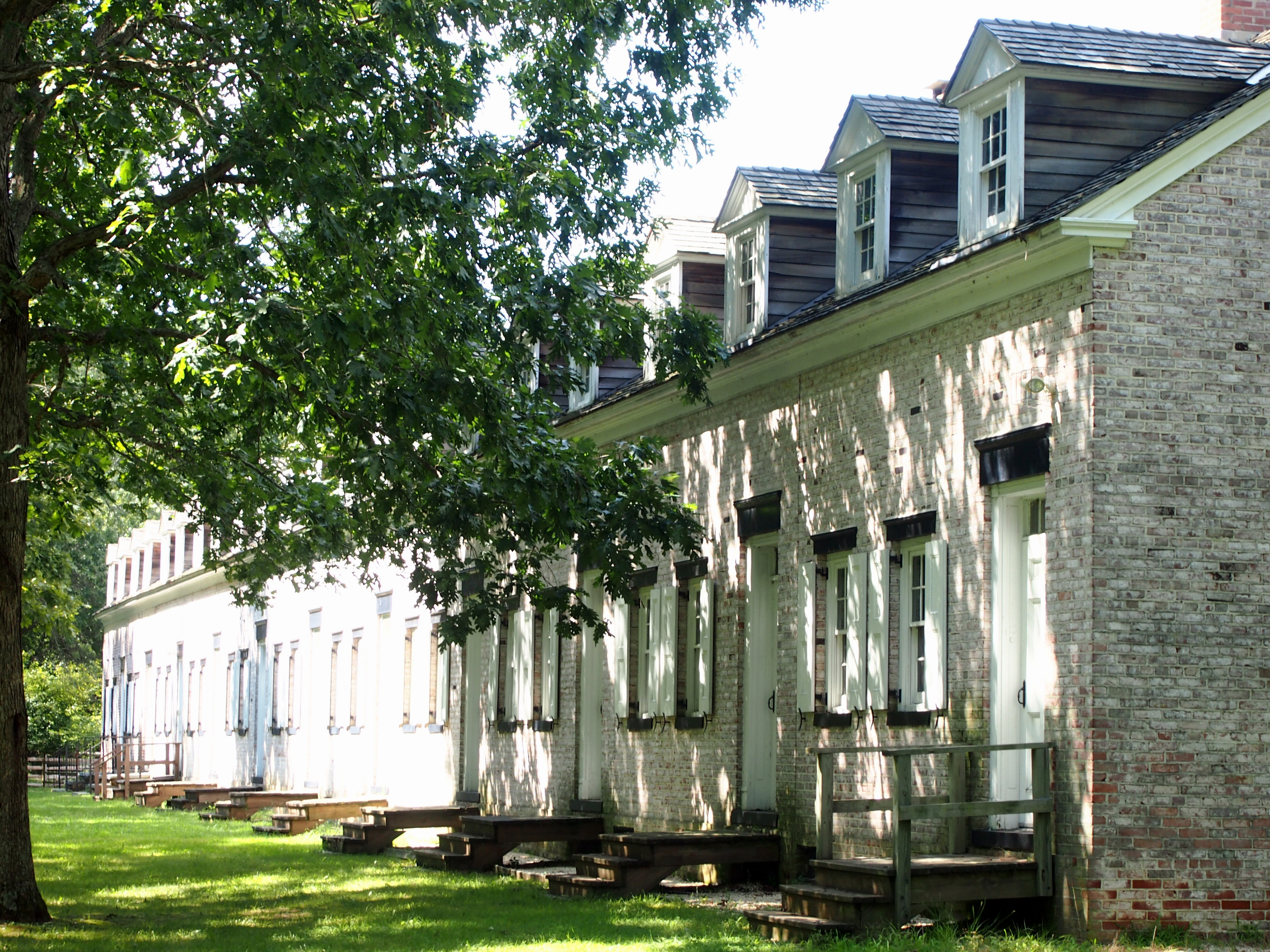

- Location within Monmouth County, New Jersey Location within New Jersey Location within the United States
- Location: 3 mi. SE of Farmingdale on CR 524, Farmingdale, New Jersey
- Coordinates: 40°9′31″N 74°7′44″W
- Area: 330 acres (130 ha)
- Built: 1750
- NRHP reference No.: 74001174
- NJRHP No.
- Added to NRHP: January 11, 1974

Allaire Village is a living history museum located within New Jersey's Allaire State Park in Wall Township, Monmouth County, New Jersey. The property was initially a Native American ceremonial ground prior to 1650, by 1750 a sawmill had been established on the property by Issac Palmer. The village was later established as a bog iron furnace originally known as Williamsburg Forge 'Monmouth Furnace' was then renamed the Howell Works by Benjamin B. Howell. In 1822, it was then purchased by philanthropist James P. Allaire, who endeavoured to turn into a self-contained community. The wood burning furnace business collapsed in 1846 and the village closed. During its height, the town supported about 500 people. Following his death, the property passed through a number of family members before being used by the Boy Scouts who started to restore the buildings for use as a summer camp. Losing the lease, the property then passed to the State of New Jersey. Allaire Village and its existing buildings are now operated by a non-profit organization - Allaire Village, Inc. Historic interpreters work using period tools and equipment in the blacksmith, tinsmith, and carpentry shops, while the old bakery sells cookies, and general store serves as a museum gift-shop styled store. The church building is frequently used for weddings. The village relies heavily on volunteers to provide historical interpretation and to model historic crafts for the visitors. The site is also host to community events such as community band concerts, antique sales, weekly flea markets and square dance competitions.

== History ==
Allaire Village is the history of a particular geological formation and the man who was drawn to it because of his business needs. Throughout the course of his ownership, James Peter Allaire created a thriving community centered around the bog iron industry, with his company known as Howell Works, which was just one of his business concerns. Allaire owned a marine steam engineering plant in New York City, the Allaire Iron Works, a steam packet line and various steamships that, together, gave him the resources to control his business from the raw materials to the finished product. When building up the community, he constructed the largest furnace in the US at the time for the iron ore. The Historic Allaire Village that remains today reflects the ideals of James P, Allaire and of the industrial era that flourished between the end of the War of 1812 and the years just before the American Civil War.

The rise and fall of Allaire's business enterprises encompasses the period from 1822 to 1855, commonly referred to as the Jacksonian Era, during which began industrialization and mechanization on a large scale, and the rise of urban and rural industrial communities, reform movements such as temperance, anti-slavery, free churches and free schools. Through Allaire's constant search for financing and capital the difficult economic times can be felt, particularly the Panic of 1837, the first economic depression to disrupt this nation's economy.

During the War of 1812, an embargo on British products and goods caused businessmen like Allaire much difficulty in procuring the resources needed for America's fledgling industrial base. For Allaire, the embargo created a scarcity of iron stock necessary for his manufacturing operations and led him to look at acquiring a satisfactory means of assuring a steady, inexpensive supply of raw materials.

What initially interested Allaire in the property now known as Historic Allaire Village was the presence of significant quantities of bog iron ore. This bog ore, so called because of its formation in marshes and swampy areas, was a valuable resource in America before the discovery of vast iron ore deposits in the mountains of Northern New Jersey and Pennsylvania. Unlike the latter ore, bog ore is easily accessible and requires no deep shaft or strip mining to extract it. He also saw the then virgin forests in the vicinity would produce excellent fuel for the smelting'of bog iron ore.

Bog ore is a renewable resource when mined and utilized with care. It is produced when rain water leaches out humic and tannic acids and reacts with carbon dioxide, which is produced as a part of the natural life-cycle of microorganisms in the soil. Part of this leachate consists of iron particles from deeper in the soil. As the water passes through these areas of loamy soil, also called marl, it deposits a solution of iron carbonate which rises up to the surface. This iron carbonate then combines with the surface soil and, over time, hardens into a solid mass. This process only takes about 25 to 35 years, making it an ideal, almost perpetual resource for industry but only if treated with respect. If the ore bed is left undeveloped and unpolluted, the beds can be mined indefinitely farther south in New Jersey. The operators of furnaces were forced to purchase ore from Staten Island, New York, because the ore beds had been over-mined.

== Restoration ==
Deserted in 1846, the property occasionally saw residents. Newspaper accounts report that a few of the houses were occupied and one cottage briefly restored as the "Delisle Inn"; but most buildings sat largely unused. The property passed through family members until 1901 when it was purchased by Arthur Brisbane. Arthur Brisbane used a couple of the buildings for residences until the late 1920s.

Starting about 1900, the village was used as a backdrop for silent movies. Most notable of the films using the backdrop was Lilac Time. in 1929, 800 acres of the area that had become known as the "Deserted Village" was rented to the Monmouth County Boy Scouts for summer camping. The camp was called "Camp Burton at Allaire". When the Boy Scouts took over the area, the abandoned buildings were quite dilapidated. The Boy Scouts partnered with other organizations for the initial restoration of many of the structures. For example, the Asbury Park Kiwanis club helped with the general store restoration; the Foreman's cottage was restored by St. James Church in Red Bank (it served as the first aid hut during camping and programs); the Belmar Kiwanis club set up an athletic field. The camp sites were also open to other organizations such as the Girl Scouts, 4-H, Masons, and others. During the depression, the area was used as a camp for the Civilian Conservation Corps. Following the Death of Arthur Brisbane, the council lost the use of the property and the 1940 season was the last season. A plaque can be found on the side of the General Store giving a salute to the BSA program during this time frame.

In 1941, Mrs. Phoebe C. Brisbane (Arthur Brisbane's Widow) deeded the property to the state for development into a recreational park as a memorial to her husband. The state of New Jersey allowed the war department to build a mock "German Town" on the property during World War II for training of troops at Fort Monmouth. Due to lack of restoration funds, the state of New Jersey made a 25-year lease to a non-profit called the "Deserted Village of Allaire" to allow them to start restoration in the mid 1950s. The initial 11-member board of trustees consisted of one member who was actually a descendant of James Allaire; Edwin B. Allaire was a member of the board in 1957.

Attempts to raise funds for restoration stated about 1952. The buildings and property sat idle till restoration funds became available in 1957. At that point, the property had again become overrun with vegetation and buildings were in dis-repair. The Blacksmith shop and the General Store were the initial focus of the restoration. Following that, the stables and bakery were restored. The Stables were restored with the focus to become a riding academy. The Allaire Village was Dedicated as a State Park in June 1957 and officially reopened by Governor Robert B. Meyner on May 24, 1958. The museum was established through the efforts of the New Jersey State Federation of Woman's Clubs in 1958. Although the restoration of the Village is not yet complete, the buildings that remain, the interpretive programs based on a multitude of available primary records, and even the landscape make Allaire Village a rare resource. Through them, visitors are able to experience and better understand the forces that shaped New Jersey's industrial power in the early 19th century.

== See also ==
- Howell Living History Farm
- Monmouth Battlefield State Park
- Feltville Historic District
