= James P. Allaire =

Mechanic and engine builder

James Peter Allaire
- Born: July 12, 1785; New Rochelle, New York, United States (probable) or Annapolis Royal, Nova Scotia, Canada (possible)
- Died: May 20, 1858 (aged 72); Howell Works, New Jersey
- Resting place: Allaire Family Cemetery, Old Huguenot Cemetery, New Rochelle, New York
- Education: Less than Elementary (undocumented)
- Occupations: Industrialist, Engineer, Inventor, Merchant, Philanthropist
- Spouses: Frances Duncan (m. 1804–1836) Calicia Allaire Tompkins (m. 1846)
- Partner: Charles Soutinger
- Children: 10

James Peter Allaire (July 12, 1785 – May 20, 1858) was a master mechanic and steam engine builder, and founder of the Allaire Iron Works (est. 1815), the first marine steam engine company in New York City, and later Howell Works (est. 1822), in Wall Township, New Jersey. His credits also include building both the first compound steam engine for marine use and the first New York City tenement structure.

== Life and career ==
Allaire was born either in his family's ancestral home city of New Rochelle, New York, or under self-preserving exile in Annapolis Royal, Nova Scotia, Canada. A large number of "Tory" Loyalist individuals and families fled New York to Canada during the British evacuation of New York after the Paris Peace Treaty of 1783 ended the United States War of Independence, including branches of the Allaire Family that took residence in Annapolis Royal, Nova Scotia. Petitions to the Continental Congress in 1784 by a Peter A. Allaire of New York, a Colonial American Loyalist, indicate a high probability that the relevant branch of the Allaire family may have remained in New York during and after the British evacuation. Sometime after 1793, the Allaire patriarch purchased a house in New York City, and found work as a livery stabler.

In 1802, at the age of 17, his oldest son, James Peter, began working for Francis Elsworth, a brass founder in the city. Allaire would marry Frances Duncan, a distant cousin, two years later, and he continued to advance at the brass foundry. They would eventually have nine children, five of whom lived to adulthood.

By 1806, having learned the brass business, Allaire opened his own foundry. Before the War of 1812, Allaire's foundry received an order from Robert Fulton to make the brass works for the Clermont, the first commercially successful steamboat. After Fulton's death in 1815, Allaire leased that gentleman's Jersey City, NJ shop and tolls from the estate. He then took as a partner Charles Soutinger, Fulton's chief engineer. Under that partnership, Allaire and Stoutinger built the engine for Fulton's last steamship design, the Chancellor Livingston, as well as the air cylinder for the Savannah, the first steam powered vessel to successfully cross the Atlantic.

When Soutinger died shortly thereafter, Allaire removed the business to Corlear's Hook in lower Manhattan where his brass foundry was located. By 1820, Allaire was operating that largest marine engine building shop in the United States. He personally held a number of patents for steam engine improvements developed at his shop, which was known as the James P. Allaire Works.

During the War of 1812, an embargo on British products and goods caused businessmen like Allaire much difficulty in procuring the resources needed for America's fledgling industrial base. For Allaire, the embargo created a scarcity of iron stock necessary for his manufacturing operations and led him to look at acquiring a satisfactory means of assuring a steady, inexpensive supply of raw materials.

What initially interested Allaire in the property now known as Historic Allaire Village was the presence of significant quantities of bog iron ore. This bog ore, so called because of its formation in marshes and swampy areas, was a valuable resource in America before the discovery of vast ore deposits in the mountains of Northern New Jersey and Pennsylvania. Unlike the latter ore, bog ore is easily accessible and requires no deep shaft or strip mining to get it.

More significantly, bog ore is a renewable resource when mined and utilized with care. It is produced when rain water leaches out humic and tannic acids and carbon dioxide, which is produced as a part of the natural life-cycle of microorganisms in the soil. Part of this leachate consists of iron particles from deeper in the soil. As the water passes through these areas of loamy soil, also called marl, it deposits a solution of iron carbonate which rises up to the surface. This iron carbonate then combines with the surface soil and, over time, hardens into a solid mass. This process only takes about 25 to 35 years, making it an ideal, almost perpetual resource for industry but only if treated with respect. If the ore bed is left undeveloped and unpolluted, the beds can be mined indefinitely. Farther south in New Jersey, the operators of furnaces were forced to purchase ore from Staten Island, New York, because the ore beds had been over-mined.

== Family ==
=== Anthony Allaire ===
Allaire's uncle, Anthony Allaire, fought with the British Armies during the war under Col. Banastre Tarleton and Major Patrick Ferguson's rifle corps during the Carolina campaigns. Anthony Allaire kept a journal before and after the Battle of King's Mountain in October of 1780, recounting the battle, his capture, the Loyalists' prisoners brutal treatment, and his eventual escape to British lines in Charleston, SC. There is also a transcript of his court-martial for killing a fellow soldier over a dispute about the hiring of an Irish bagpiper in Charleston to impress a girl on St. Patrick's Day in 1781. He was acquitted of the charges based on a claim of self-defense. He settled in Nova Scotia, Canada after the war.
