= Farmingdale and Squan Village Railroad =

Map

The Farmingdale and Squan Village Railroad was a shortline railroad that traversed via central New Jersey. The railroad was formed under a special law of New Jersey, on April 3, 1867. On May 21, 1879, it was one of three railroads consolidated to form the Freehold and Jamesburg Agricultural Railroad Company. Its former right-of-way, along with a portion of the Freehold and Jamesburg Agricultural Railroad's right-of-way, has become the Edgar Felix Bikeway.

During its service life, the primary economic advantage provided by the F&SV was to move farm produce and seafood products from the fertile central Jersey coast to major rail corridors providing direct lines to Philadelphia (P&NYRR) and New York (NJ Southern RR). The F&SV Railroad arrived too late to serve the Allaire Iron Works during its peak production days. The Allaire works was an innovator in iron casting and produced propellers and steam engine parts for some of the largest steamships of the period.

When the F&SV was under control by the New York and Long Branch Railroad in 1875, service was provided to the following locales:

F&SV	Milepost	F&JA	Milepost	Notes
Sea Girt			28.0	
Squan Village	0.0		27.0	
Allenwood	3.0		24.0	located near the Old Squan Bridge about three miles from Manasquan
Allaire	5.5		22.0	5.5 miles from Manasquan; was an early thriving village due to the Howell Iron Works established by James P. Allaire
Farmingdale	8.5		19.0	Intersected NJ Southern RR
Fairfield	12.5		15.0	
Howell's	13.5		14.0	
Freehold	16.5		11.0	
		Battle Ground	9.0	
Manalapan	19.5		8.0	
Englishtown	20.5		7.0	
		Tracey's	5.0	
		Hoffman's	3.0	
Jamesburg	27.5		0.0	Terminus of F&J; Junction with Camden & Amboy Railroad
Dayton				Dayton was first known simply as The Cross Roads, where James Whitlock built a tavern on Georges Road around 1750. Early enterprises included a brick manufacturer and large nursery. In 1866, the name was changed from Cross Roads to Dayton, in honor of William L. Dayton, an attorney for the Freehold and Jamesburg Agricultural Railroad. Dayton had helped settle disputes arising from the location of a railroad right-of-way. He was later a U.S. senator, vice presidential nominee, and Minister to France.
Monmouth Junction				Monmouth Junction was created as the junction of three rail branches, the New York division of Pennsylvania Railroad, the Rocky Hill and the Jamesburg and Freehold.
Kingston				Kingston's location on the Lenape Assunpink Trail where it crossed the Millstone River was the prime factor in its early prominence. Kingston was by far the most active and important village of South Brunswick, being situated on both the heavily traveled King's Road and Milestone River, combining commercial activities of both mills and taverns.
Rocky Hill				In 1839, the Camden & Amboy Railroad Company constructed the first railroad line located in the vicinity of Rocky Hill. It was a single track railroad extending from Trenton, and generally followed the winding contour of the Delaware and Raritan Canal to Princeton and Rocky hill, then east to Monmouth Junction.

== Brief connection to New York and Long Branch Railroad ==
In 1875, S. Leonard Thurlow owned all of Sea Girt and occupied the Mansion House of the late commodore Richard Stockton. Thurlow was eager to have the railroad, which had been built from Farmingdale to Manasquan (Squan Village), extended to Long Branch. (original account difficult to read - under study).

Two maps from 1873 show what we are calling the Sea Girt branch of the PRR by the name of the Freehold & Farmingdale Railroad. This route heads east across Broad Street and curves north to what was then the Central Railroad of New Jersey. What is interesting is that there is no "junction" or "SG" interlocking at this time; the CNJ did not yet continue south of the curve connecting to the Freehold & Farmingdale. The remainder of the CNJ past Main Street Manasquan south through Brielle, Point Pleasant and Bay Head was not yet constructed in 1873.

A more detailed 1878 map still only shows the CNJ curving to the west to connect to the F&F; still no junction or track to the south. The map shows the CNJ as single track to Broad Street. Just west of Broad Street, there is a passing siding that extends to just past North Main Street and the station is located about midway along the double-tracked section. Interestingly enough, the Sea Girt branch is now labeled the Farmingdale and Squan RR on this map. There is also a very short siding to a small "Engine House" located off of the curve near Pearce Avenue. This would be near where the #2 Firehouse is today.

In a 1889 map, a lot has changed. The single track route south from Sea Girt that curved west toward the "Farmingdale and Squan" is now double track and continues south from Sea Girt through Manasquan, past a new Main Street (Manasquan) station, and continues off this map toward Brielle. The "Farmingdale and Squan" is now a junction with the north/south NY&LB in Sea Girt at what was later called "SG interlocking". The former CNJ is now called the New York and Long Branch, which is noted to be "PRR & CNJ". There was a siding serving the Main Street station from the south off the westbound (Bay Head) track and a long siding serving what most recently was Manasquan Lumber extending south off the eastbound track. Another siding off of the eastbound track served a cannery and later an ice house near where the Manasquan Elks Club is today.

This map does not quite extend to where the SG interlocking would have been, but the single track leading off of the now NY&LB is still visible along with the little single track siding and engine house. This branch is now listed as the Freehold and Jamesburg Railroad; a passenger station is shown near Broad Street (Manasquan) and a freight station is shown east of North Main Street. The passing siding is still there, but another siding is shown on the south side extending from west of the freight station and ending just west of the passenger station at a "coal yard".

In a short section dedicated to the railroad influence in Manasquan, it is confirmed that the first railroad to town was from the west in 1872. The "Farmingdale and Squan Village" railroad to Manasquan was noted as being an eastward extension of the "Freehold and Jamesburg Agricultural Railroad" to Manasquan. It then extended across Broad Street, curving north and ending in Sea Girt. The CNJ had not reached Sea Girt in 1872.

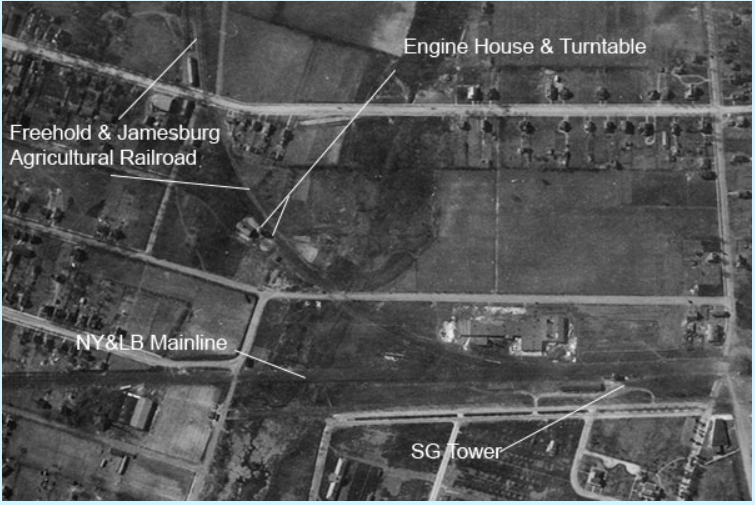
