= Monmouth Battlefield State Park =

- Monmouth Battlefield Historic District
- U.S. National Register of Historic Places
- U.S. National Historic Landmark District
- New Jersey Register of Historic Places
- View of the battlefield from Combs Hill

- Location within Monmouth County, New Jersey Location within New Jersey Location within the United States
- Location: Manalapan Township / Freehold Township, Monmouth County, New Jersey
- Nearest city: Freehold Borough
- Coordinates: 40°16′23″N 74°18′50″W
- Area: 1,819 acres (736 ha)
- Built: 1778
- Website: Official site
- NRHP reference No.: 66000467
- NJRHP No.: 2013

Significant dates
- Added to NRHP: October 15, 1966
- Designated NHLD: January 20, 1961
- Designated NJRHP: May 27, 1971

Monmouth Battlefield State Park is a 1,818-acre (7.36 km^{2}) New Jersey state park on the border of Manalapan and Freehold Township in Monmouth County, New Jersey, United States. It preserves the ground on which the Battle of Monmouth of the American Revolutionary War was fought on June 28, 1778. The battlefield was designated a National Historic Landmark in 1961 and was added to the National Register of Historic Places in 1966 for its significance in military history. The park is administered by the New Jersey State Park Service.

== Park features ==
Visitor center atop Combs Hill

The park preserves a rural eighteenth-century landscape of farmland, orchards, hedgerows, woods and wetlands. Trails for hiking and horseback riding cross the battlefield, and wayside exhibits on Perrine Hill, Combs Hill and other key sites explain the fighting that took place there.

The visitor center stands atop Combs Hill, where Continental Army artillery was posted during the battle. It houses exhibits on the battle and its participants, including artifacts excavated from the battlefield. The building reopened in 2013 after a renovation. Picnic areas are located nearby.

=== Annual reenactment ===
The Friends of Monmouth Battlefield, a volunteer support group, co-sponsors an annual reenactment of the battle with the state. It is usually held on a weekend in June near the anniversary of the battle, and hundreds of reenactors encamp in the park for the event. The group started the reenactment partly to draw attention to the deterioration of battlefield features such as the Craig House.

== History ==
In June 1778, the British army under Sir Henry Clinton withdrew from Philadelphia across New Jersey toward New York. On June 28, as the British left Monmouth Court House, an advance force of George Washington's Continental Army under Charles Lee attacked the British rear guard. After Lee's force withdrew, Washington's main army held high ground on Perrine Hill while Nathanael Greene's artillery on Combs Hill fired into the British flank. It was one of the largest and longest battles of the war, fought in extreme heat, and ended inconclusively; the British continued their march to the coast that night.

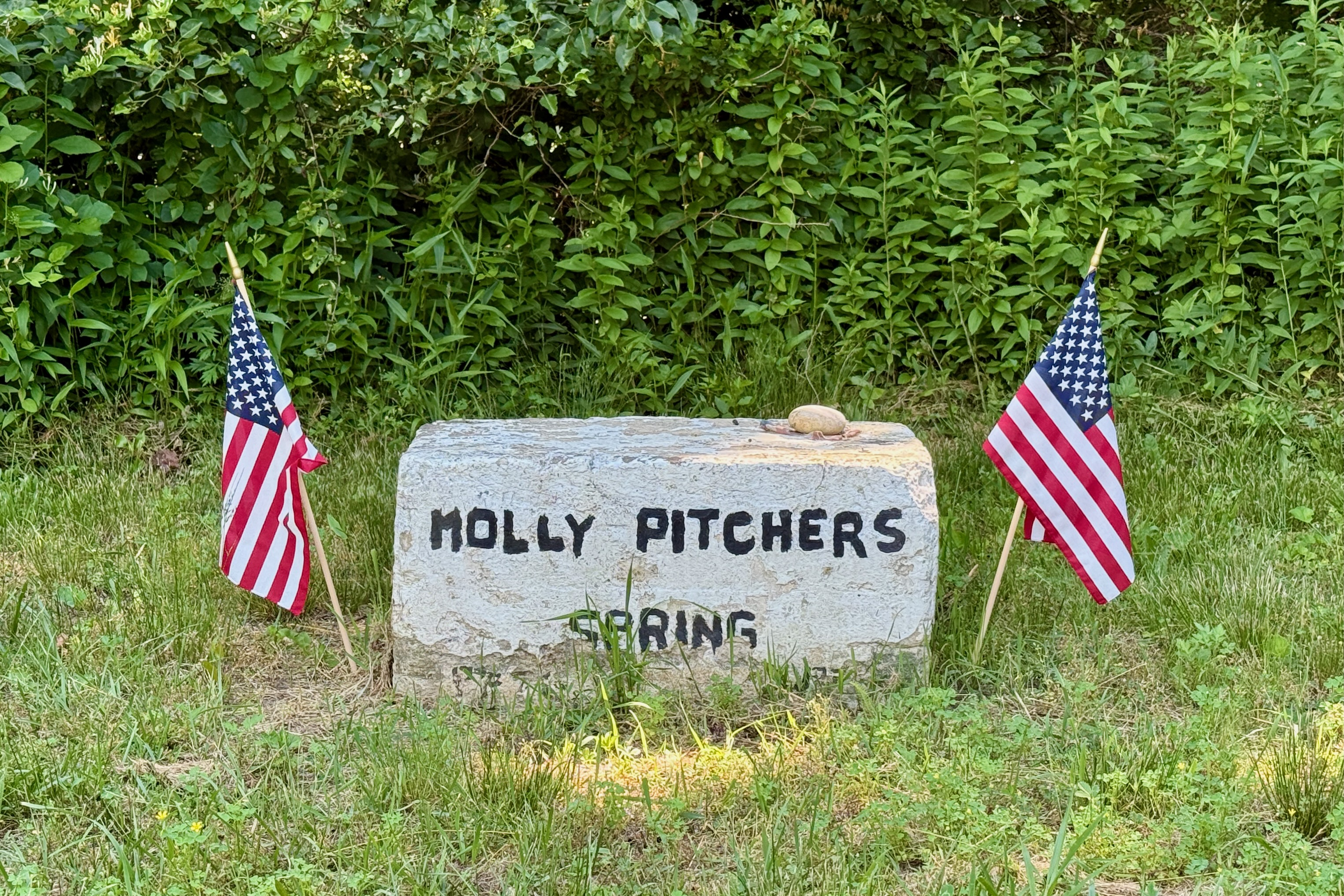
Molly Pitcher's Spring historical marker

The battle is the setting of the legend of Molly Pitcher, a woman said to have taken her husband's place at a cannon after he fell. A spring on the battlefield is marked as associated with the legend.

The battlefield is crossed by the former right-of-way of the Farmingdale and Squan Village Railroad/Freehold and Jamesburg Agricultural Railroad, which was considered as a possible route for the proposed Monmouth Ocean Middlesex Line.

== Historic structures ==
Many of the colonial-era farmhouses on the battlefield did not survive twentieth-century development. Three of the seven farmhouses that stood during the battle remain in the park:

- the Sutfin Farmhouse (1718)
- the Rhea-Applegate House (1745)
- the Craig House (1746), home of John and Ann Craig, who fled as the battle approached. British troops used the vacant house as a field hospital, and it was restored to its wartime appearance in 1993 through the efforts of the Friends of Monmouth Battlefield.

Other buildings on the battlefield postdate the battle. The Conover–Perrine House (1832), at the north end of the park on the site of an eighteenth-century Perrine house, is an example of late Federal architecture. The Italianate Cobb House was built nearby in 1870. The mid-eighteenth-century Combs Farmhouse, which stood near the present playground and ice pond, was demolished in the 1960s.

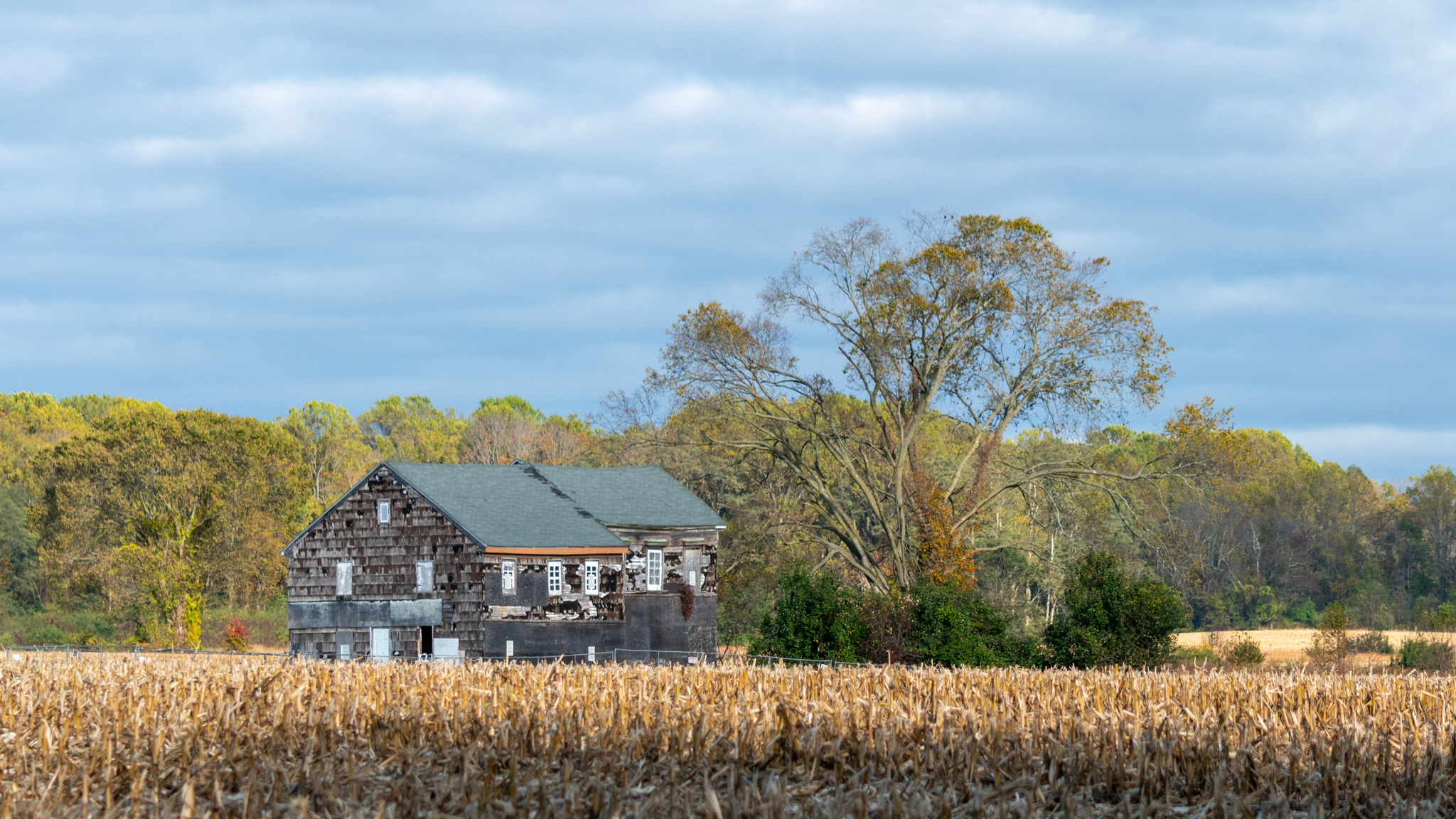
Sutfin House

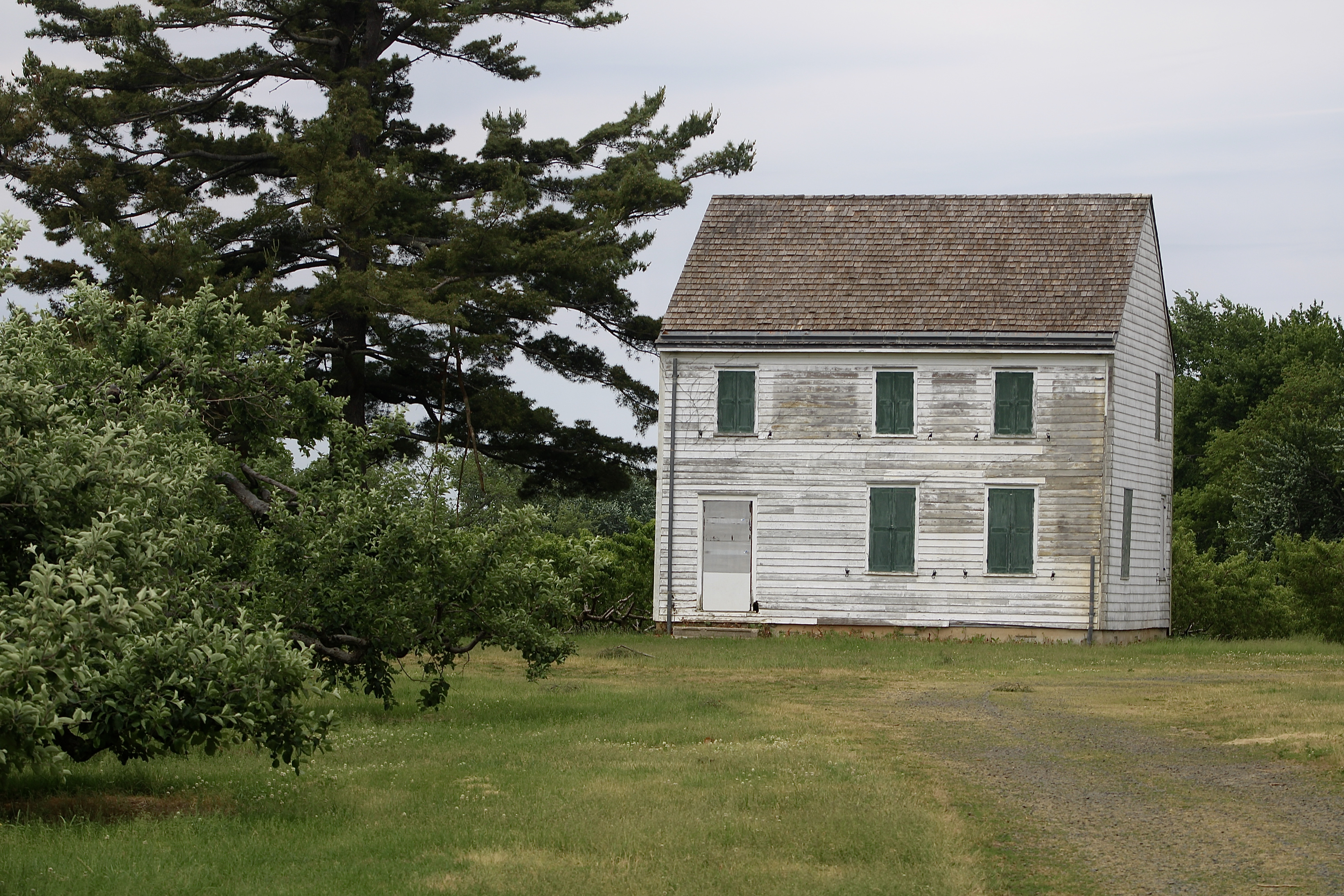
Rhea-Applegate House

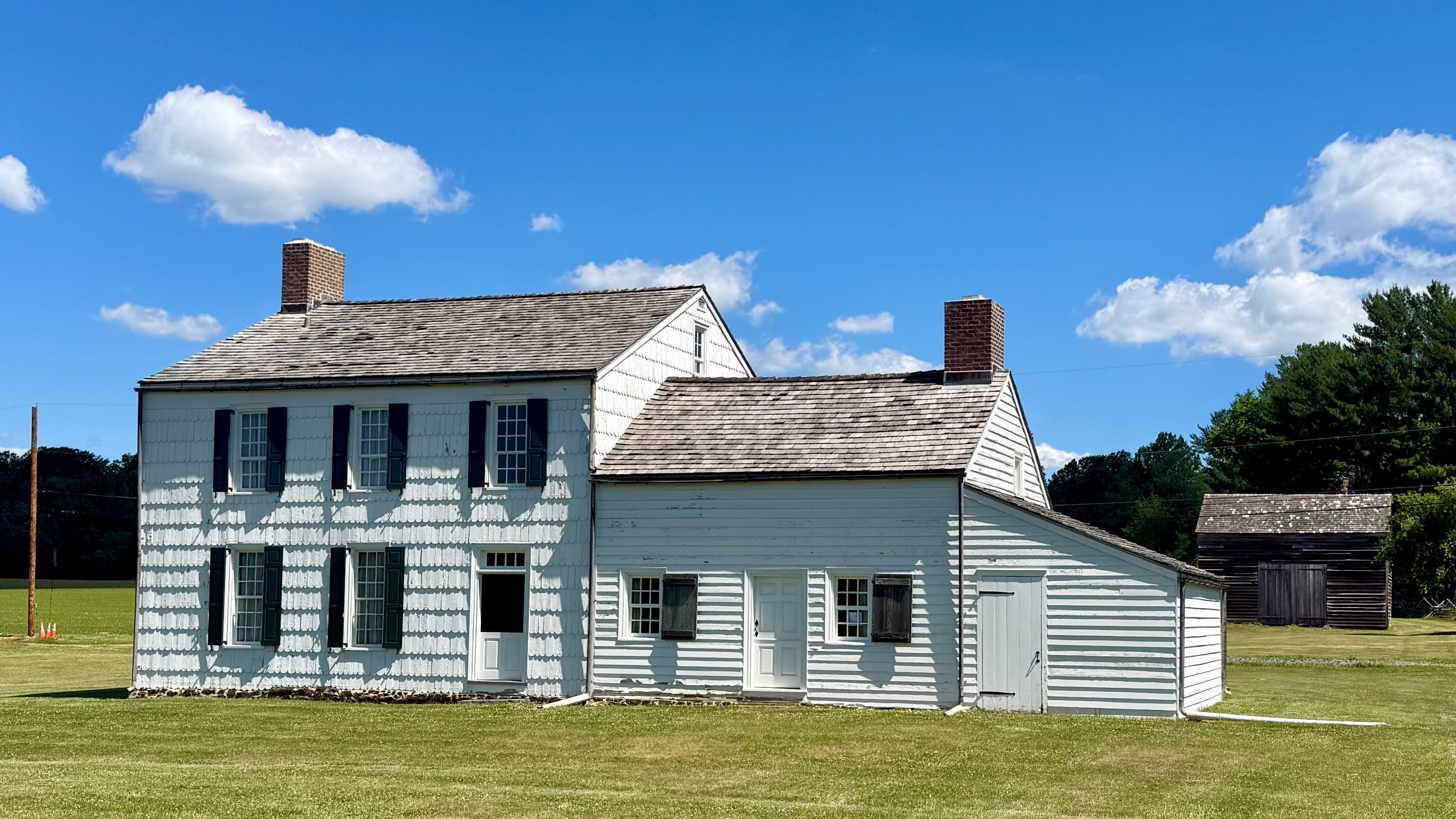
Craig House

Conover–Perrine House

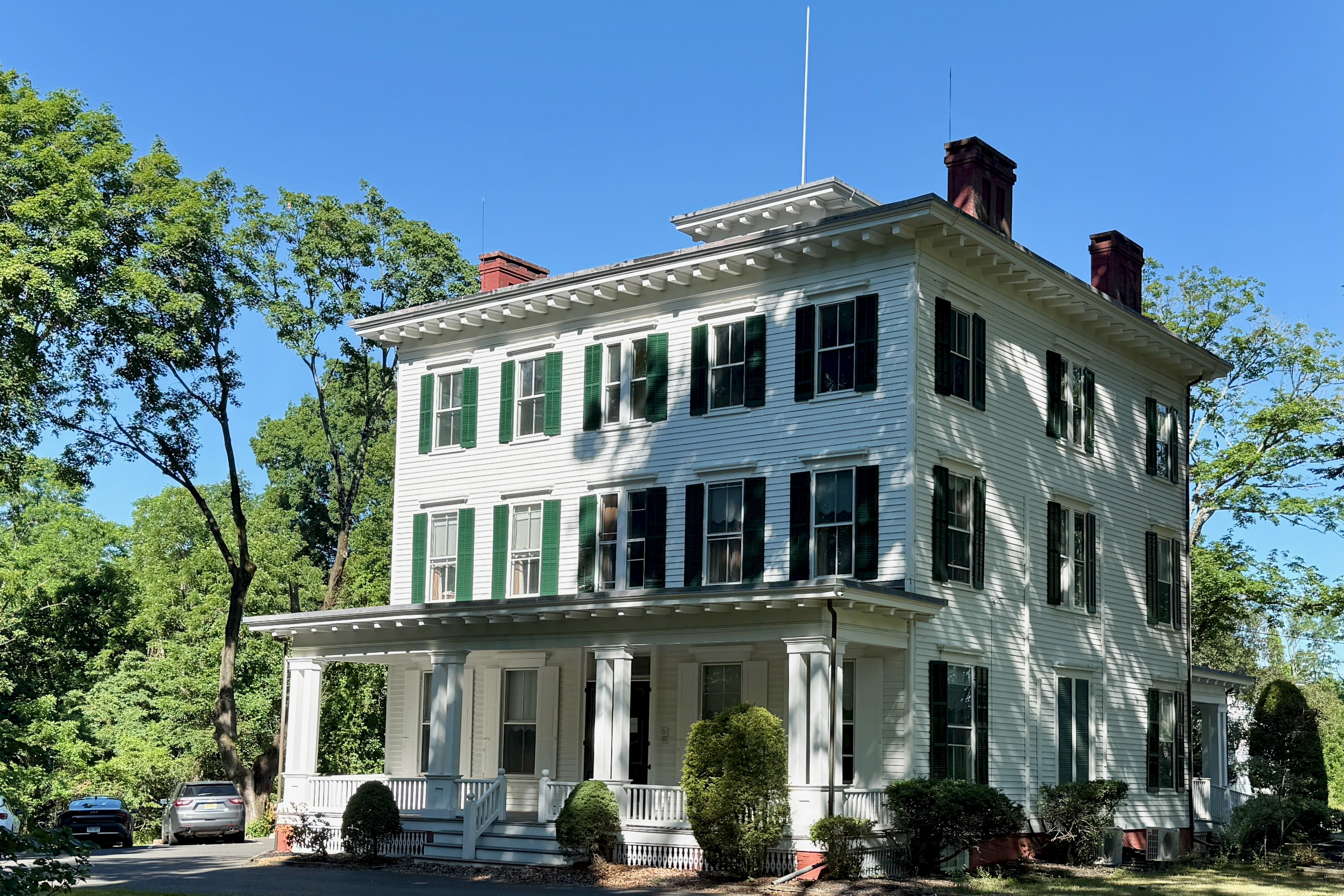
Cobb House
