= Edgar Felix Bikeway =

Rail trail in New Jersey

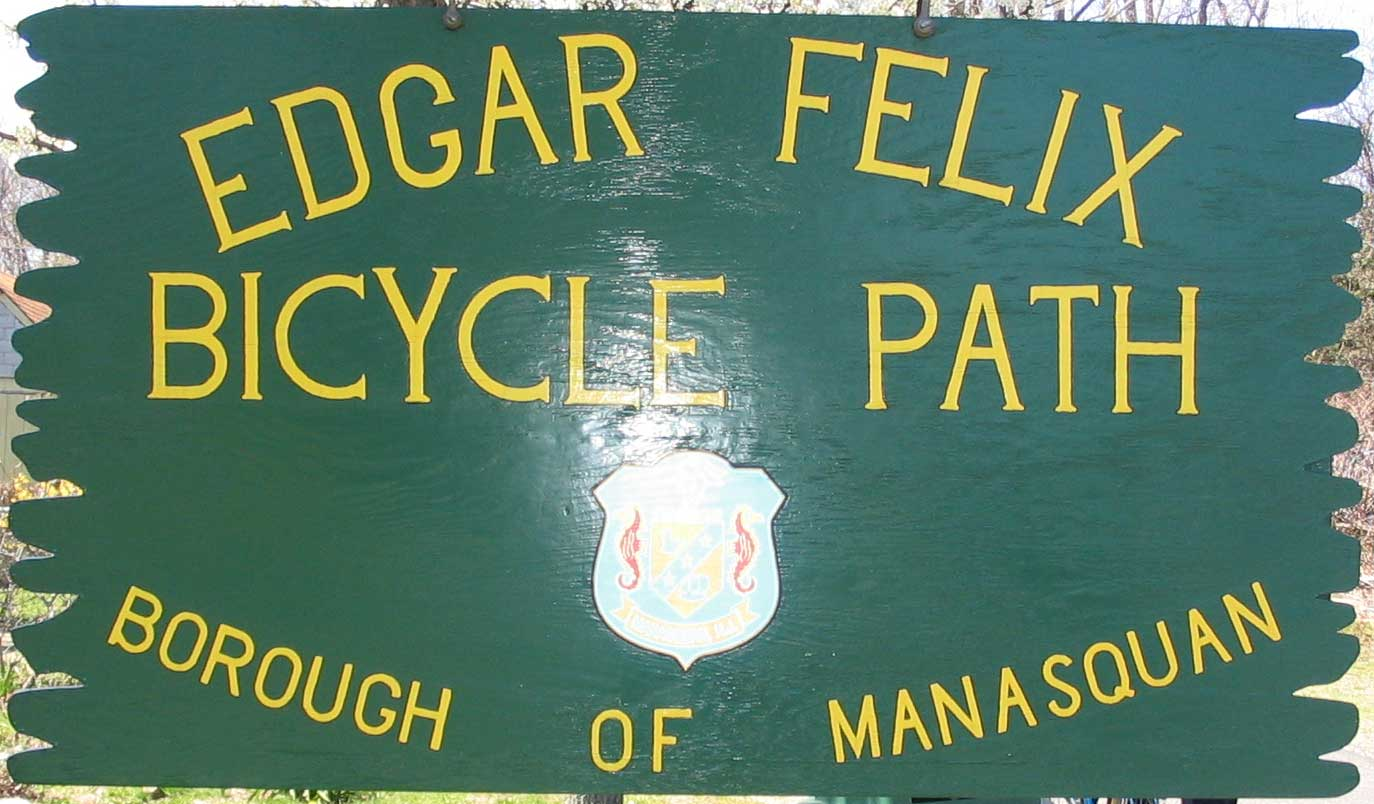
- Length: 5.4 mi (8.7 km)
- Location: Monmouth County, New Jersey
- Trailheads: Manasquan; Allaire State Park; Capital to Coast Trail
- Use: Hiking, Cycling
- Difficulty: Easy
- Season: Year round
- Sights: Allaire; Pine Creek Railroad; Allenwood General Store; Atlantic Ocean
- Surface: Asphalt
- Right of way: Farmingdale & Squan Village Railroad; Freehold & Jamesburg Agricultural Railroad

The Edgar Felix Bikeway is a 5.4 miles (8.7 km) rail trail in New Jersey between Manasquan and Allaire State Park. The trail was constructed on a former roadbed of the Farmingdale and Squan Village Railroad and the Freehold and Jamesburg Agricultural Railroad.

The original trail opened in 1971, and has been expanded several times. The Edgar Felix was the first cycling trail created in the state of New Jersey.

== Trail heads ==
- Allaire State Park - The western trail head contains the restored Allaire bog iron village and the Pine Creek Railroad. The Allaire mountain biking trails can be accessed from the Edgar Felix Bikeway where it crosses Hospital Road a mile from the park.

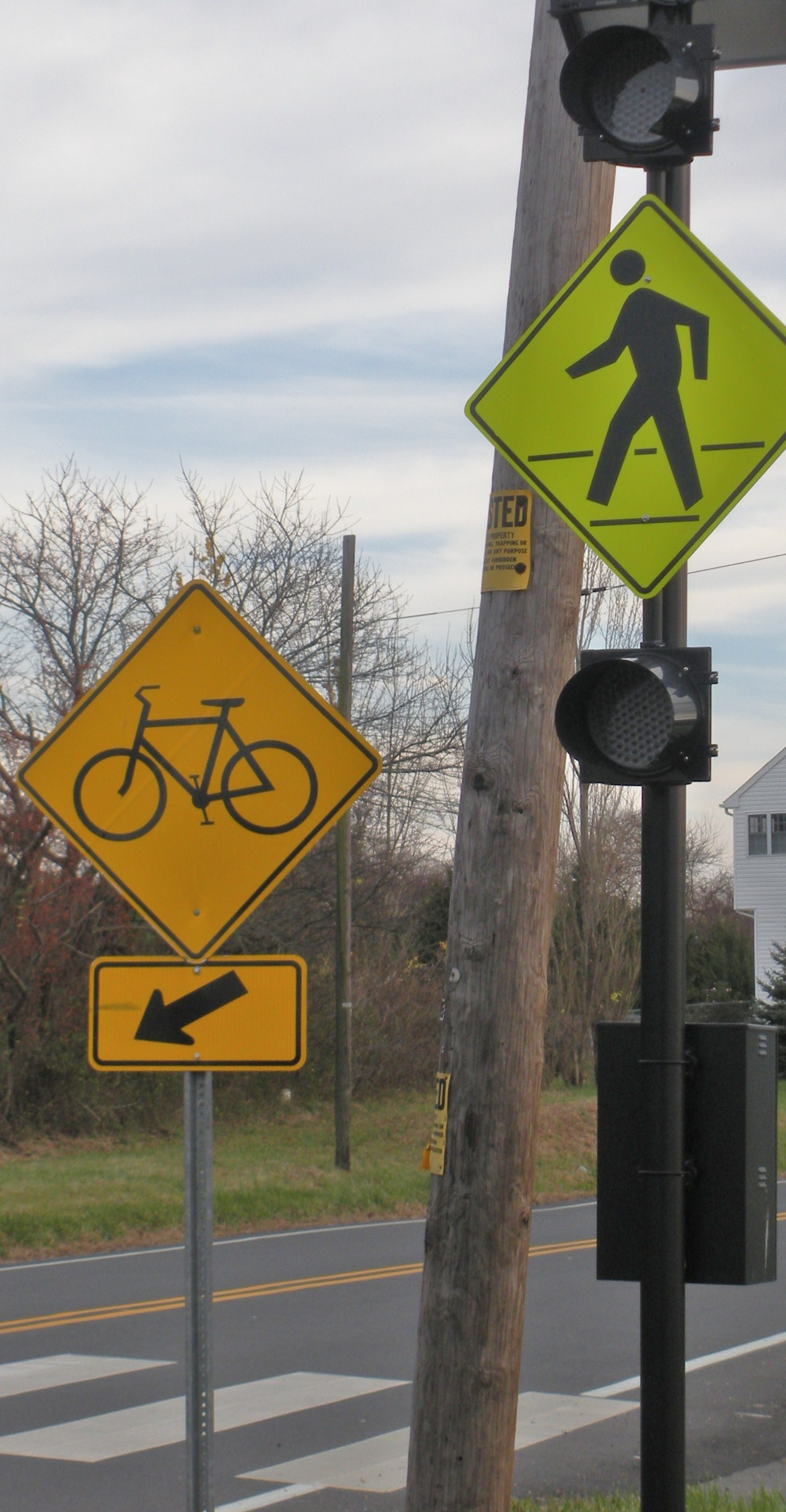
Crossing lights along Route 18 spur

- Route 18 Bikeway Spur - The northern trail head, completed in 2005, extends 1.75 miles (2.82 km) to the Wall Township municipal recreational complex along the abandoned Route 18 right-of-way. Unlike the original section, the Route 18 spur was not built on a former rail bed but rather an undeveloped limited access highway right-of-way; as result, the trail is subject to rapid changes in its grade and pathway. The Route 18 spur has electronic crosswalk warning signals at most road crossings; these crossing lights augment the standard Zebra crossing and signage found on typical trail crossings. Unlike a HAWK beacon, these lights are only amber caution flashers that do not require a motorist to stop.
- Manasquan (North Main Street) - eastern trail head

== History ==
The Freehold & Jamesburg Agricultural Railroad operated under the auspices of the Pennsylvania Railroad (PRR), which abandoned the Manasquan-Farmingdale segment in 1966. Cycling enthusiast and retired radio researcher Edgar Felix lobbied the borough of Manasquan to obtain the abandoned roadbed that same year. The following year the path was extended through the Allenwood section of Wall Township, terminating at Hospital Road in Wall Township. In 2005, the trail was extended west from Hospital Road across state park land to the public access area of Allaire State Park and north along the abandoned Route 18 right-of-way to the Wall Township Municipal Complex.

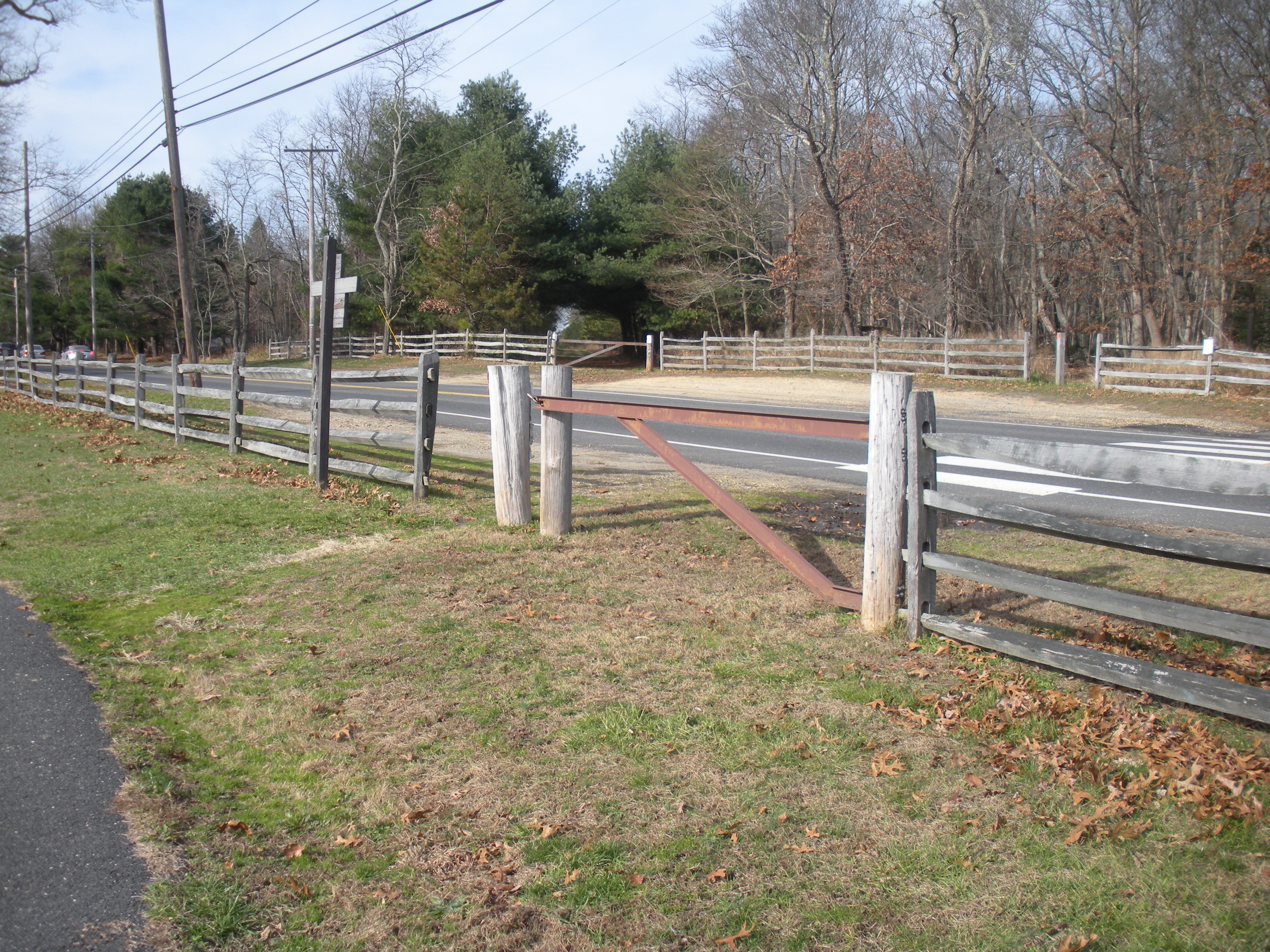
Trail crossing Atlantic Avenue

As of September 2011, Wall Township was seeking a $180,000 matching grant from Monmouth County to add a spur trail that would extend the Edgar Felix trail 0.8 miles (1.3 km) along Hospital Road to meet with the Allaire mountain biking trails. This new spur would begin where the current trail crosses Hospital road on its way to the main entrance of Allaire State Park. There is also a proposal to continue this new spur to the Howell Township border at a future date.

The unimproved right-of-way for the Freehold and Jamesburg Agricultural Railroad continues west through Allaire State Park until it is severed by Interstate 195.
