= Fairfield, Monmouth County, New Jersey =

Populated place in Monmouth County, New Jersey, US

Fairfield, New Jersey
- Unincorporated community
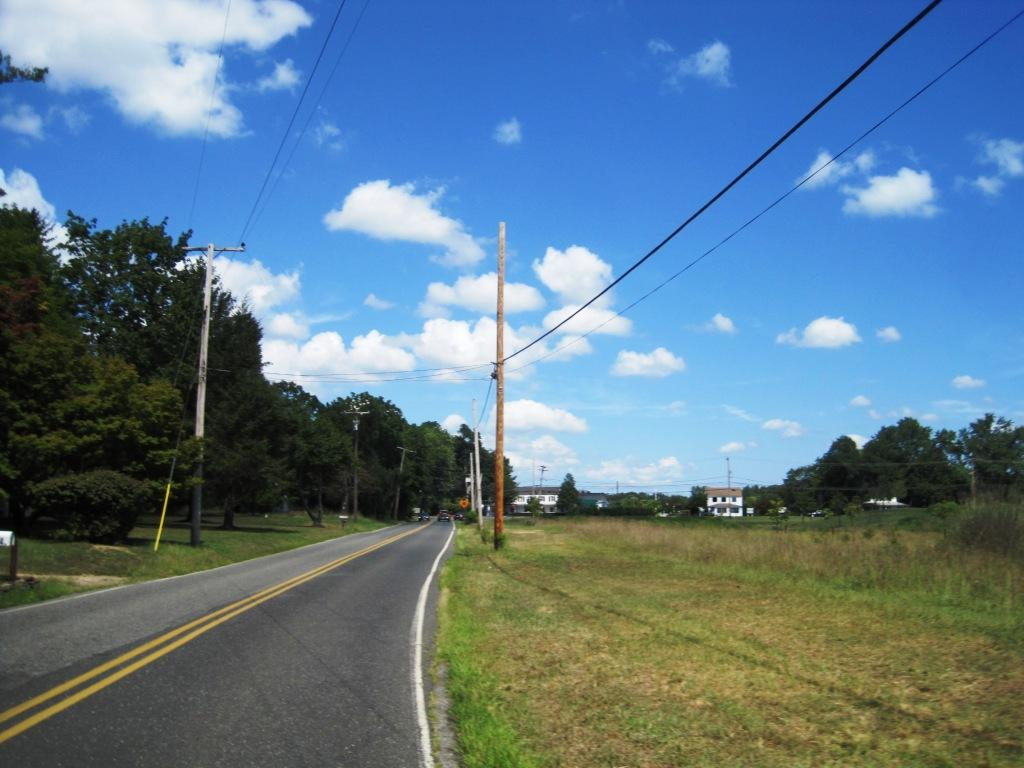
- Looking north along Ketchum Road

- Location in Monmouth County. Inset: Location of county within the state of New Jersey Fairfield (New Jersey) Fairfield (the United States)
- Coordinates: 40°12′19″N 74°12′50″W
- Country: United States
- State: New Jersey
- County: Monmouth
- Township: Howell
- Elevation: 89 ft (27 m)
- GNIS feature ID: 876258

Fairfield is an unincorporated community located within Howell Township in Monmouth County, in the U.S. state of New Jersey. The community is centered on the intersection of County Route 524 (CR 524) and Ketchum Road, where the Colonial Era Our House Tavern is located. The area includes several small businesses, township offices and schools. There are also small farms and residential developments in the area. Fairfield was a stop on the Freehold and Jamesburg Agricultural Railroad.
