= Capital to Coast Trail =

Trail in New Jersey, USA

Coordinates: 40.1274°N 74.0546°W

The Capital to Coast Trail is a 55-mile (89 km) cross-state multi-use trail network that is designed to span the U.S. state of New Jersey (west to east) from the state capital of Trenton on the Delaware River to the beach front town of Manasquan on the Atlantic Ocean. The cross-state trail concept was conceived in 2000 by Fred Lockenmeyer and Rudy Buser, of Manasquan, the founding members of the Friends of the Capital to the Coast Trail. When finished the trail will be the third longest in the state, behind the Delaware and Raritan Canal Trail and the Appalachian Trail.

== Trail segments ==
The trail roughly runs along the route of Interstate 195 as part of a proposed greenway across the central section of New Jersey. The trail consists of the following public land segments from east to west):

- Edgar Felix Bikeway – The initial developed section added to the trail system.
- Allaire State Park
- Manasquan River Reservoir
- Turkey Swamp Park
- Assunpink State Wildlife Management Area – Might be removed by realignment
- Robbinsville – Possible next segment of development
- Mercer County Park – Might be removed by realignment
- Mercer Votech campus – Second section of trail
- D&R Canal Trail

== Current trail status ==
As of August 20, 2008, the Capital to Coast Trail is incomplete, existing mostly on paper; however on June 16, 2006, the initial segment was dedicated with a ribbon cutting ceremony at Allaire State Park where the existing 30+ year old Edgar Felix Bikeway became the first segment. On August 20, 2008, a ribbon cutting ceremony was held to open a second 2.5-mile (4.0 km) section in West Windsor off Old Trenton Road. The Trenton Times reports that the trail is expected to be completed in the summer of 2010.
