= Freehold and Jamesburg Agricultural Railroad =

- Maximum extent of the Freehold and Jamesburg Agricultural Railroad

Overview
- Headquarters: Jamesburg, New Jersey, U.S.
- Locale: New Jersey, USA
- Dates of operation: 1853–1964
- Predecessor: Farmingdale and Squan Village Railroad, Freehold Marl Company Railroad, Camden and Amboy Rail Road and Transportation Company
- Successor: Freehold Industrial Track

Technical
- Track gauge: 4 ft 8 1/2 in (1,435 mm) standard gauge
- Length: 27.323 miles (44 km)

The Freehold and Jamesburg Agricultural Railroad was a short-line railroad in New Jersey. The railroad traversed through the communities of Freehold Borough, Freehold Township, Manalapan Township, Englishtown Borough, Monroe Township, and Jamesburg Borough, en route to Monmouth Junction in South Brunswick Township.

The railroad's former right-of-way, from Jamesburg to Farmingdale is still in use route 524 Farmingdale to Manalasquan has been abandoned right of way sold to New Jersey Board of Public Utility Commissioners

== History ==
=== 19th century ===
The railroad was first chartered on March 12, 1851, and incorporated on March 21, 1851. By the end of 1851, only $40,000 of bonds were subscribed, so the Camden and Amboy Railroad was given authorization to subscribe $100,000 of additional stock to fund the new railroad. Surveying for the line began on September 8, 1851, grading began on October 19, 1852, and the first track was laid on April 4, 1853. The first section of line was opened on July 18, 1853. The establishment of the Freehold & Jamesburg Agricultural Railroad caused Jamesburg to become a railroad hub.

The company was formed as a means to haul marl for fertilizer production. The headquarters of the railroad was originally in Jamesburg; later it was moved to Camden.

William L. Dayton, who would later serve as a United States senator, the first Republican nominee for vice president (in 1856), and as minister to France, was an attorney for the Freehold and Jamesburg Agricultural Railroad. Dayton had helped in settling land disputes arising from the location of the railroad's right-of-way route passage. In 1866, the community of Dayton in nearby South Brunswick Township was renamed in his honor.

The railroad was reorganized under a special law of New Jersey, on May 21, 1879, when it was incorporated, in which three railroads consolidated to form the company, including the Farmingdale and Squan Village Railroad, the Freehold Marl Company Railroad (which later became the Monmouth County Agricultural Railroad) and Camden and Amboy Rail Road and Transportation Company.

The length of the trackage amounted to 27.323 miles (44 km). The Allaire family was a major stock holder in the company and James P. Allaire's son, Hal, was on the board of directors.

=== 20th century ===
In 1901, the railroad split into the Pennsylvania Railroad getting the line from Monmouth Junction to Manasquan, and the Central Railroad of New Jersey getting the line from Freehold to Leonardo. The line from Freehold to Aberdeen Township has been abandoned and the right of way is now the Henry Hudson Trail . In 1966, the New Jersey Board of Public Utility Commissioners (PUC) approved the sale of a 2.8-mile-long (4.5 km) portion of the former railroad's right-of-way to Jersey Central Power & Light Company. In 1976, Conrail took over the abandoned railroad line, and operations resumed. The railroad line is known as the Freehold Industrial Track, which occasionally runs freight service between Freehold and Jamesburg.

=== 21st century ===
On July 1, 2022, The Chesapeake and Delaware, LLC bought the line from Conrail to form the Delaware and Raritan River Railroad. On January 16, 2023, they started to rehab the line from Jamesburg to Farmingdale. Most of the portion was completed in October 2023. A new section was added to allow rail service to head south to Lakewood via a "Wye".

== See also ==
- Monmouth Ocean Middlesex Line
- Raritan River Railroad
