= Wall High School (New Jersey) =

High school in Monmouth County, New Jersey, US

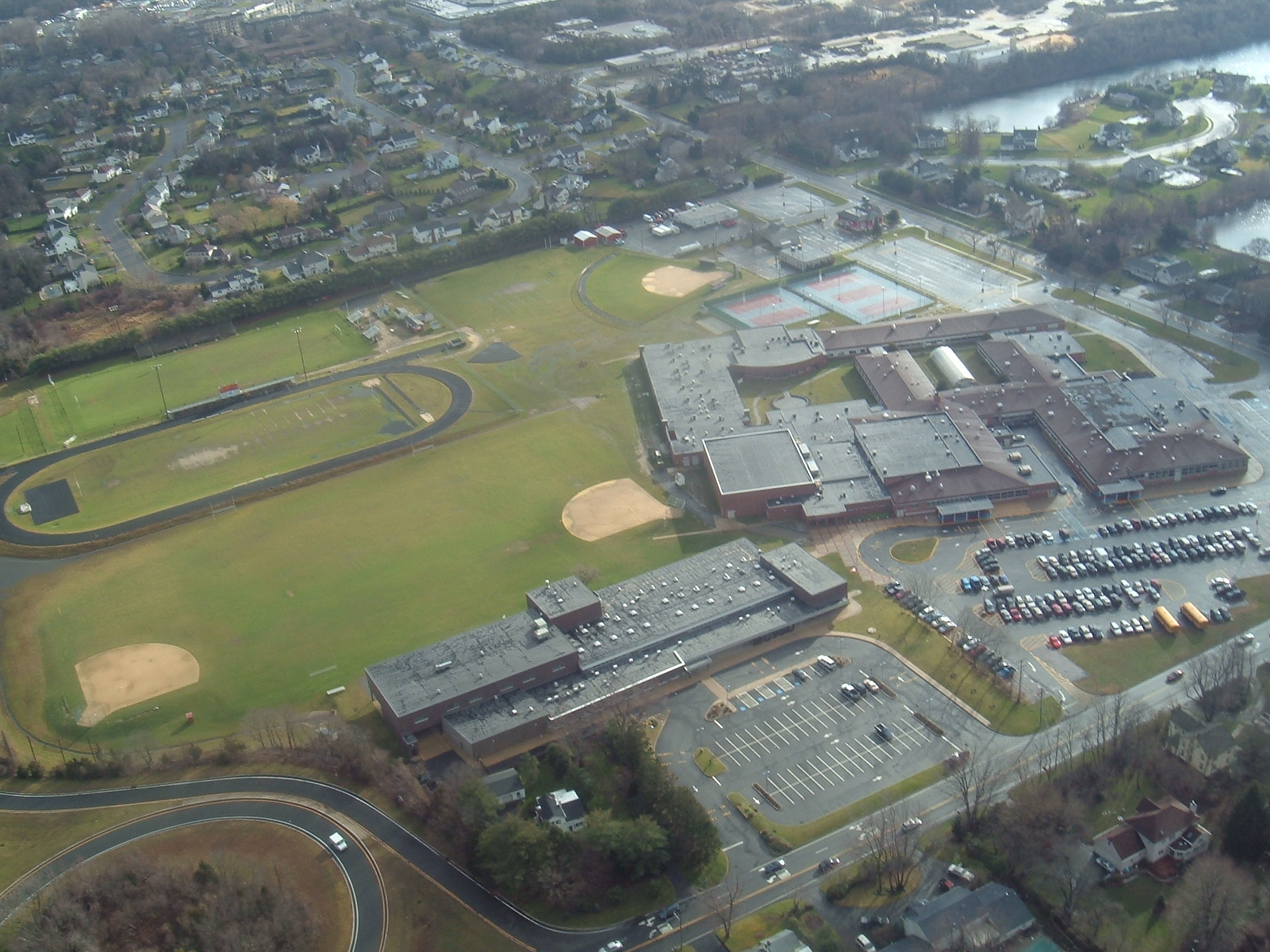

Location
- 1630 18th Avenue; Wall Township, Monmouth County, New Jersey 07719; United States; 40.167576°N 74.059232°W

Information
- Type: Public high school
- Established: September 1959
- NCES School ID: 341689004132
- Principal: Kevin Davis
- Faculty: 102.4 FTEs
- Enrollment: 924 (as of 2024–25)
- Student to teacher ratio: 9.0:1
- Colors: Crimson white and blue
- Athletics conference: Shore Conference
- Team name: Crimson Knights
- Newspaper: The Crimson Courier
- Yearbook: Lance
- Website: whs.wallpublicschools.org

Wall High School is a four-year comprehensive public high school that serves students in ninth through twelfth grades from Wall Township in Monmouth County, in the U.S. state of New Jersey, operating as the lone secondary school of the Wall Township Public Schools.

As of the 2024–25 school year, the school had an enrollment of 924 students and 102.4 classroom teachers (on an FTE basis), for a student–teacher ratio of 9.0:1. There were 113 students (12.2% of enrollment) eligible for free lunch and 19 (2.1% of students) eligible for reduced-cost lunch.

== History ==
Constructed at a cost of $2 million (equivalent to $22.1 million in 2025) and designed to accommodate up to 1,260 students, the high school opened in September 1959 for grades 7–11 with an enrollment of 900. Students in twelfth grade that year attended Manasquan High School, which had served Wall Township as part of a sending/receiving relationship that was ended due to overcrowding at the Manasquan school.

== Rankings ==
The school was the 90th-ranked public high school in New Jersey out of 339 schools statewide in New Jersey Monthly magazine's September 2014 cover story on the state's "Top Public High Schools," using a new ranking methodology. The school had been ranked 137th in the state of 328 schools in 2012, after being ranked 155th of 322 schools listed in 2010, 127th out of 316 in 2008, and 121st out of 316 in 2006.

Schooldigger.com ranked the school 153rd out of 381 public high schools statewide in its 2011 rankings (a decrease of 12 positions from the 2010 ranking) which were based on the combined percentage of students classified as proficient or above on the mathematics (84.2%) and language arts literacy (92.7%) components of the High School Proficiency Assessment.

== Extracurricular activities ==
Wall High School offers many clubs and after school activities, including the Environmental Club, Mock trial, Key Club, National Honor Society, National Art Honor Society, National Music Honor Society, DECA, NNDCC: Drill & Rifle Team, S.A.D.D. and International Thespian Society.

== Athletics ==
The Wall High School Crimson Knights compete in Division B North of the Shore Conference, an athletic conference comprised of public and private high schools in Monmouth and Ocean counties along the Jersey Shore. The conference under the jurisdiction of the New Jersey State Interscholastic Athletic Association (NJSIAA). With 790 students in grades 10–12, the school was classified by the NJSIAA for the 2019–20 school year as Group III for most athletic competition purposes, which included schools with an enrollment of 761 to 1,058 students in that grade range. The school was classified by the NJSIAA as Group II South for football for 2024–2026, which included schools with 514 to 685 students.

Wall High School is known for its sports rivalry with Manasquan High School in Manasquan, with the two schools playing each other in front of crowds of 5,000 at their annual Thanksgiving Day American football game. The football rivalry with Manasquan dates back to 2001 and was listed at 10th on NJ.com's 2017 list "Ranking the 31 fiercest rivalries in N.J. HS football". Wall leads the series with an overall record of 13-10 through the 2023 season.

The school was the Group III winner of the 2019-20 ShopRite Cup, which recognizes athletic achievement across all interscholastic sports.

The boys soccer team won the Group III state championship in 1978 (defeating Ramapo High School in the playoff finals), 1979 (vs. Dwight Morrow High School), 1980 (vs. James Caldwell High School), 1981 (vs. Randolph High School) and 2004 (vs. Scotch Plains-Fanwood High School). Between 1978 and 1981, the team won four consecutive state titles, which is tied for the third-longest streak in the state. From 1977 to 1983 the program had an overall record stood at 130-13-5 and had overall state rankings during their 1978-1981 championship streak of #2, #3, #1 and #1 (among 300 eligible schools). During those years, they won five straight Central Jersey Group III state sectional championships and had an NJSIAA state playoff record of 24 wins out of 25 games over a five-year span. The teams won five Wall Fall Festival Classics over this period as well and captured six straight Monmouth County Titles as well as winning the first ever Monmouth-Ocean County Championship. The 1978 team finished the season with a record of 23-2-1, including 13 shutouts, and capped off the year by winning the team's first state championship with a 4–1 win against Ramapo in the Group III finals. In 1979, the team won its second consecutive Group III championship with a 2–1 win against Dwight Morrow, to finish the season with a record of 21-4-1. The 1980 team ended the season with an 18-game unbeaten streak, capped off by a 3-2 championship-game win at Mercer County Park against James Caldwell in the Group III finals that gave the team its third straight title and a record of 23-1-1 for the year. With George Gelnovatch leading the team with 20 goals, the 1981 team finished the season with a 23-1-1 record after a 4–1 win against Randolph in the Group III championship game, the program's fourth consecutive state title. The 1992 team won the Central Jersey Group III championship and in 1993 a Central Jersey Group II sectional title was added to the overall record. The 2004 team won the Group III state championship, the program's fifth state title and the first since it won four in a row from 1978 to 1981, with a 4–1 win over Scotch Plains-Fanwood High School in a game played at The College of New Jersey, to finish the season with a record of 19-3-3. The Wall High School soccer program was founded by Harry Baldwin, a member of the U.S. National Soccer Hall of Fame, and has produced nearly 50 All-State players. Wall High School's first soccer captain and Soccer America Professional Coach of the Year, Gary Hindley, played here. These teams had two coaches, Tom Farley and Jim Carhart, who together have coached for nearly 50 years and combined have won nearly 700 games. Farley won the National Coach of the Year title in 1979. Carhart has won regional and state coaching honors several times. Top soccer players at Wall include Tom Kain, America's top player at Duke and Walls's only Olympian, and George Gelnovatch, runner-up as the US's top player as well as All American. In 2009, displays were erected and a Hall of Fame established honoring the overall success of WHS soccer teams.

The football team won the Central Jersey Group III title in 1982, 1983, 2002 and 2019, and won the South Jersey Group III title in 2016. The 1982 team finished the season 11-0 after winning the program's first Central Jersey Group II sectional title with a 21–0 win against South Plainfield High School in the playoff finals. In front of a championship-game crowd of 9,000, the 1983 team won the Central Jersey Group III title with a 21–3 win against Ocean Township High School to finish the season with an 11–0 record. The team won the 2016 South Jersey Group III state sectional championship, defeating reigning four-time champion Delsea Regional High School by a score of 20–7 in the tournament final. The team won their fifth sectional title in 2019 with a 14–13 win against Rumson-Fair Haven Regional High School.

The baseball team won the Group III state championship in 1983 (vs. Indian Hills High School), 2004 (vs. Raritan High School) and 2019 (vs. West Morris Central High School), and won the Group II title in 1994 (vs. Jefferson Township High School). Head Coach Todd Schmitt retired in 2019 with 403 wins and two state titles (in 2004 and 2019), four state sectional titles (2002, 2004, 2008 and 2019) and two Shore Conference titles (in 2003 and 2004). The 2004 baseball team won all four championships (division, Shore Conference, Middlesex County Tournament and Group title), becoming the first Shore Conference baseball team to achieve that milestone. The 2004 team, which defeated Raritan High School by a score of 402 in the Group III final, was listed by the Asbury Park Press, as one of the best baseball teams in Shore Conference history. The team won the Group III title in 2019 with a 10–2 win against West Morris Central High School.

The field hockey team won the Central Jersey Group III state sectional championship in 1987, 1989, 1990, 1992, 1996, 2008-2010 and won the Central Jersey Group II title in 2013 and 2015; the team won the Group III state championship in 2008 vs. runner-up Holmdel High School. In 2008, the field hockey team won the Group III title with a 1–0 win on a second-half goal against Holmdel in the tournament finals and continued to the Tournament of Champions, losing to Eastern Regional High School by 3–1 in the championship game to finish the season 21–2. In 2013, the team won the Central Jersey Group II state sectional championship and continued to the Group II championship game where they fell to West Essex High School by a score of 1–0. Coach Nancy Gross earned her 500th win in the 2013 season with a 7–0 win over Monmouth Regional High School.

The softball team won the Group III state championship in 1997 (vs. River Dell High School) and 2007 (vs. Ramapo High School). The softball team won the 2007 Central, Group III state sectional championship with a 6–5 win over Monroe Township High School. The team moved on to win the Group I state championship with wins over Hammonton High School (11-10) and Ramapo High School (4-1) in the final game.

The 2007 girls' tennis team won the Central Jersey, Group III state sectional championship with a 3–2 win over Princeton High School in the tournament final.

The 2008 competition cheer team took first place in the state competition, grand champion in the regional competition, and second place at the national competition. In 2009, the team won its Conference Championship, took first place in the New Jersey State Competition, first place at the National Competition in Orlando, Florida, and received the Grand National Champions title (overall highest score) at the National Competition in Orlando, Florida.

In 2008, the Wall High School golf team won the South-Central Jersey Group III Tournament.

The Wall lacrosse team had its first season in 2006 and won the Shore Conference division championships in both 2008 and 2011.

The boys' bowling team won the Group II state championship in 2009.

The boys' wrestling team won the Central Jersey Group II state sectional title in 2014.

The girls' soccer team won the Group III state title in 2016 (as co-champion with Northern Highlands Regional High School) and won the Group II title in 2017 (vs. Westwood Regional High School).

The ice hockey team made its first appearance in the New Jersey Public B state championship in 2017, losing to Glen Rock High School by a score of 9–1 in the tournament final.

== Controversy ==
In 2015, former district superintendent James Habel was sentenced to five years in prison, forfeiture of his pension and the loss of his ability to work in a public sector job in the state, after his conviction on charges of official misconduct. Habel earned nearly $300,000 a year in salary and benefits, but took more than 100 vacation days that he didn't report so that he could cash out an extra $85,000 for the unused vacation time. The judge rejected Habel's attorney's requests for leniency, saying that Habel's actions were a prime example of "greed".

The school found itself in the middle of a national controversy when high school yearbooks were distributed to students at the end of the 2016–17 school year. In two instances, students wearing political campaign apparel bearing the name Trump had the logos airbrushed out of their student photos. A third student included a Trump quote in her yearbook profile, which was also omitted from final publication. Students noted that political apparel for other politicians (Reagan-Bush and Barack Obama) were included in the current and past yearbooks. The school district suspended the teacher who oversaw the yearbook, pending a formal investigation.

The school suspended a scheduled playoff game in November 2021 after players on the football team were involved in a bullying incident in which a player on the team was sexually assaulted as part of a hazing-like ritual.

== Administration ==
The principal is Kevin Davis. His core administration team includes two assistant principals.

== Notable alumni ==
- Matthew Bouraee (born 1988, class of 2006), professional soccer player for the West Adelaide SC
- Dara Brown (born 1964/1965, class of 1983), news presenter for MSNBC and former Broadway actress
- Trey Dombroski (born 2001), baseball pitcher in the Houston Astros organization
- Ashley Alexandra Dupré (born 1985 as Ashley Youmans — transferred out after sophomore year), best known as the woman at the center of the Eliot Spitzer prostitution scandal
- Andrew Fischer (born 2004), college baseball first baseman for the Tennessee Volunteers
- Fletcher (stage name of Cari Elise Fletcher, born 1994, class of 2012), singer-songwriter
- George Gelnovatch (born 1965), head men's soccer coach at the University of Virginia
- J. D. Gordon (class of 1985), former Pentagon spokesman during the George W. Bush administration
- Suzy Hansen (born 1978, class of 1995), writer, whose book Notes on a Foreign Country: An American Abroad in a Post-America World was a finalist for the 2018 Pulitzer Prize for General Nonfiction
- Gary Hindley (born 1947), soccer coach of college and professional teams
- Tom Kain (born 1963), former Director of Global Soccer Marketing for Nike, who played soccer professionally for the Kansas City Comets
- Jessica Poland (born 1988), musician signed to Geffen Records as Charlotte Sometimes
- Dan Prestup (born 1984), World's Fastest Drummer winner and drummer for Spider Rockets and Rock of Ages
- Joe Shimko (born 2000), American football long snapper
- Alex Skuby (born 1972), actor best known for appearing on King of Queens
- Tim Wright (born 1990), retired NFL tight end who was a Super Bowl XLIX champion as a member of the 2014 New England Patriots

== Notable faculty ==
- Dwain Painter (born 1942), collegiate and NFL coach who was Wall High School's first head football coach
