= World's Fastest Drummer =

Speed drumming competition

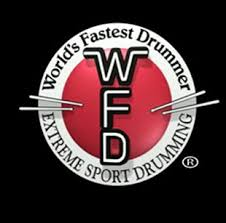
Official WFD logo

World's Fastest Drummer—Extreme Sport Drumming is a competition to determine the world's fastest drummer. A digital counting device called the Drumometer calculates and records a drummer's speed. The Drumometer, a patented electronic technology protected by U.S. Patent #6,545,207 was invented by Boo McAfee and Craig A. Kestner, aka Craig Alan, in 1999 for accurately counting drum strokes. The Drumometer is accredited by Guinness World Records as the official device used to verify the World's Fastest Drummer.

== Purpose ==
The primary goal of most WFD competitions is to determine who can play the most single strokes in sixty seconds. According to author Josh Davis, "the Drumometer uncovered a deep well of competitiveness." After experimenting with various WFD competition formats in the Southern United States, the event achieved international prominence when respected studio and clinic drummer Johnny Rabb became the first person to break 1,000 single strokes in 60 seconds, claiming the title World's Fastest Hands and recognition from the record keepers at Guinness. McAfee and Alan then officially sanctioned their events and copyrighted the phrase World's Fastest Drummer. This was followed by ads in Drum! and Modern Drummer magazines touting Rabb's accomplishment and their Drumometer device. Subsequently, they created new classes of speed drumming: fastest feet (for two-footed bass drumming), bare hands, and tag team, among others. Drumometer orders then followed, and the race to best Rabb's feats began. Music genres—including Death metal, Country, Jazz, Rock as well as Drum Corps—have since battled for dominance in the various categories. In 2002, WFD world championships became a biannual affair (winter and summer), and they were permanently stationed at the annual NAMM Show convention beginning in 2003.

== Early years ==
Early stars of the event in addition to Rabb included: veteran jazz drummer named Art Verdi, the first person to break 1100 single strokes and while using the traditional grip; Jotan Afanador, the first person to regularly perform nearly 1200 single strokes in one minute; Tim Waterson, the first person to score over 1000 single strokes on a bass drum and first identifiable personality of the bass drum division via a series of instructional videos touting his widely emulated heel-toe technique.

Acquired in 2002 was the WFD's most recognizable competitor when Dream Theater drummer and former Berklee College of Music professor Mike Mangini joined its ranks.

With the retirements of Rabb and others from active competition, the sport continued to witness runs by New Jersey website personality and Joe Morello student "Tiger" Bill Meligari, multi-category world champion Seth Davis (not to be confused with content creator SethDrums), Sam Lecompte (single paradiddle world record holder), and 2003 Summer winner Eric Okamoto.

== New era ==
Recent champions include Matt Smith, who at 16 became the youngest WFD champion and the harbinger of a new youth movement within the sport, and two bass drum competitors Tim Yeung and Mike "Machine" Mallais. Yeung was instrumental in popularizing the sport within that genre, while Mallais beat most of the existing bass drum world records formerly held by Waterson and Mangini at the Winter 2007 world championships.

In 2006 British drummer Rees Bridges became the first European to win a world's title, sparking greater interest in a WFD UK division, managed by drummer entrepreneur Ed Freitas. Later in 2006 WFD staged a national competition in Australia with smaller events held in Hong Kong and elsewhere, while the first official WFD China Championship was scheduled for 2012. After an extended hiatus, WFD Championships returned to NAMM conventions in July 2011 with Australian Joey Moujalli and American Kevin Bernardy taking hands and feet titles respectively.

In July 2007 in Austin, Texas, WFD hands champion Thomas Grosset (age 16) performed 1156 single strokes in 1 minute matched grip, the highest score ever recorded in the final championship round. Grosset's top preliminary run of 1194 made him the new WFD 16 and under World Record Holder and third in the world rankings just behind Afanador. In 2013, Grossett set the new world record of 1,208. Shortly after losing his 16 and under record, Matt Smith set a new world hands endurance record and was followed closely by 18-year-old Daniel Rice, scoring 1108 in the preliminaries.

In June 2008, Smith returned to break Mangini's traditional grip record of 1126, with a score of 1132, leaving the sport almost entirely in the hands of younger competitors. Mangini's former dominance of WFD has recently been deemphasized. He still holds the bare hand record (no sticks) of 1138 single strikes in 60 seconds.

Riccardo Merlini, a newcomer to speed drumming who is capable of performing single strokes at speeds reported at 450 BPM, uses a technique that combines elements associated with Mike Mangini’s barehanded approach with a reduced “half rotation” derived from Seth Davis’s pronation-and-supination technique.

Davis and Mangini began publicly demonstrating their respective techniques at NAMM conventions and World’s Fastest Drummer (WFD) competitions in 2003, contributing to the development and public visibility of alternative approaches to high-speed drumming.

== Controversy ==
Since the competition's inception, drummers were divided into positive and negative camps, with this phenomenon rapidly accelerating as Mangini, Rabb, Verdi, and Afanador especially surfaced on television programs and commercials, with opposing sides simultaneously battling in internet drum forums, magazines, and YouTube comments sections. WFD detractors have contended that musical instruments should not be used as tools for sport and depreciate musicality, while defenders cite the quest for technical excellence and its innocence as a non-musical exercise. As the argument has become more complex, hundreds of WFD hopefuls issue unsubstantiated Drumometer videos purporting to be world records.

Another controversy centered around the implementation of a hand technique called "push-pull" that allowed competitors to score more than one beat with a single motion but was neither a double stroke nor buzz roll. In 2011 it was determined that push-pull qualified as a hybrid single stroke but requiring a separate category with its own records. The ruling further asserted that world rankings would remain limited to standard singles competitors.

== World record holders ==
- Single Stroke Roll: Tom Grosset - [20.13 strokes a second] 1208 Strokes in 60 seconds - Hand Speed
- Double Stroke Roll: Seth Davis - [20 strokes a second] 1200 Strokes in 60 seconds - Hand Speed
- Single Paradiddle: Sam LeCompte - [17.2 strokes a second] 1032 Strokes in 60 seconds - Hand Speed
- Single Stroke Roll: Mike Mallais - [17.23 strokes a second] 1034 Strokes in 60 seconds - Foot Speed
- Double Stroke Roll: Tim Waterson - [23.45 strokes a second] 1407 Strokes in 60 seconds - Foot Speed
- Bare Hand Single Stroke Roll: Mike Mangini - [18.96 strokes a second] 1138 Strokes in 60 seconds - Bare Hand Speed

== WFD champions ==
Champions and competitors are documented online.

- Nov. 2021 "Fastest Hands" Logan Newhouse (904) "Fastest Feet" Stephen Dorbish (809)
- Spring 2019 “Fastest Hands” Marc Wilkens (953) “Fastest Feet” Dane Slinger (796)
- Summer 2016 "Fastest Hands" Lizhou Wang (1057) "Fastest Feet" Felix Garza III (847)
- Summer 2015 "Fastest Hands" Braxton Burke (953) "Fastest Feet" Josh Robinson (899)
- Spring 2015 "Fastest Hands" Charles Goodwin (926) "Fastest Feet" Josh Robinson (825)
- Summer 2014 "Fastest Hands" Wang Peng (1049) "Fastest Feet" Perry Dattilo (840)
- Summer 2013 "Fastest Hands" Dave Stroup (989) "Fastest Feet" Serena Dalton (846)
- Summer 2012 "Fastest Hands" Daniel Rice (1005) "Fastest Feet" Jack Blackburn (870)
- Summer 2011 "Fastest Hands" Joey Moujalli (995) "Fastest Feet" Kevin Bernardy (860)
- Winter 2007 "Fastest Hands" Jeff Guthery (1054) "Fastest Feet" Mike Mallais (978)
- Summer 2006 "Fastest Hands" Matt Smith (1030) "Fastest Feet" Hensley Souryavong (774)
- Winter 2006 "Fastest Hands" Rees Bridges (1007) "Fastest Feet" Tim Yeung (872)
- Summer 2005 "Fastest Hands" Randy Briggs (1021) "Fastest Feet" Dan Prestup (858)
- Autumn 2005 "Fastest Hands" Arne Widderich (924) "Fastest Feet" Matt Garrett (888)
- Summer 2004 "Fastest Hands" Sam LeCompte (1061) "Fastest Feet" Adam Fachler (844)
- Winter 2004 "Fastest Hands" Bill Meligari (1019) "Fastest Feet" Mike Duncan (782)
- Summer 2003 "Fastest Hands" Eric Okamoto (1018) "Fastest Feet" Kermit Tarver (768)
- Winter 2003 "Fastest Hands" Kai Katchadourian (909) "Fastest Feet" Reno Kiilerich (878)

== 2015 Legal Filings-Defending the Drumometer Patent US #6,545,207 ==
McAfee has filed patent infringement lawsuits in Chicago against Guitar Center, Ahead Products, Cherub Technology, which sells a similar drum stroke counting device; and Yamaha Corporation of America, which has incorporated a drum stroke counting feature in its popular line of DTX electronic drum kits.

In response to an ongoing controversy in the music world over who was, in fact, the world's fastest drummer, Boo McAfee teamed up with electrical engineer and drummer, Craig Alan Kestner, and developed the Drumometer™ to accurately count drum strokes on a drum pad. McAfee and Kestner were awarded U.S. Patent No. 6,545,207 on their invention and began promoting “World’s Fastest Drummer®” (“WFD”) competitions with the Drumometer™. Craig left Drumometer in 2007 to continue a career in engineering but still owns the first Drumometer prototype affectionately known as Frankenstein.

“Extreme Sport Drumming” competitions are now regularly held worldwide and have been featured on CNN, MTV, VH1, PBS, FOX, and ESPN. Boo McAfee and Extreme Sport Drumming were recently the subjects of the film Fast Company, which opened to rave reviews at the Milwaukee Film Festival on September 27, 2015.

The popularity of Extreme Sport Drumming, however, has led to many imitators of McAfee's patented Drumometer™. After trying for years to license, or stop, the sales of copycat drum stroke counting devices, McAfee has now begun filing patent infringement lawsuits with the help of patent attorney Anthony Dowell of Chicago.

“I contacted all of the companies selling imitation drum stroke counting pads,” McAfee said. “Unfortunately, none of them would respect my patent rights and pay a reasonable license fee. Guitar Center told me they wouldn’t even talk to me unless I filed ‘formal proceedings.’ So that's what we did.”

“Boo’s experience is common these days,” patent attorney Anthony Dowell explained. “In today’s patent climate, companies have no respect for inventors or patent rights. Most will ignore an inventor until a patent infringement lawsuit is filed. That usually gets their attention.”

Dowell has filed three patent infringement lawsuits for McAfee in the United States District Court for the Northern District of Illinois, the first against Guitar Center and Yamaha on October 27, 2015 (15-cv-9555) and two more against Ahead Products, Inc. (15-cv-10395) and Cherub Technology Inc. (15-cv-10403) on November 18, 2015.
