= Dan Prestup =

American drummer, percussionist, and drum instructor

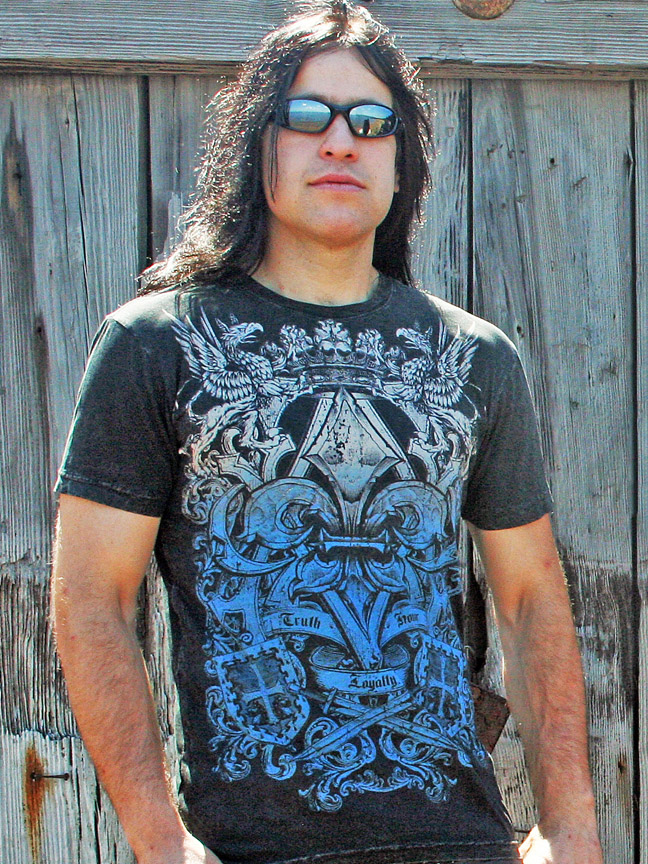
- Dan Prestup in May 2011.

Background information
- Born: Daniel Benjamin Prestup; November 13, 1984 (age 41); Pequannock Township, New Jersey
- Genres: Hard rock, heavy metal
- Occupation: Musician (Drums)
- Instruments: drums, percussion
- Years active: 2006–present

Daniel Benjamin Prestup (born November 13, 1984), better known as Dan Prestup, is an American drummer, percussionist, and drum instructor. He is the drummer for symphonic metal band Everdawn (formerly known as Midnight Eternal), hard rock band Spider Rockets, and several other projects.

Dan Prestup is recognized as one of the fastest drummers in the world. In 2005, Prestup won the World's Fastest Drummer competition at the NAMM Show in Indianapolis, Indiana, earning top honors in the Fastest Feet category by achieving 858 drumometer hits in one minute. In addition, Prestup's 2004 achievement of 1,031 single strokes in 1 minute is still recognized among the thirty highest marks in the world as of March 2020.

Prestup has performed on multiple national tours, including the Vans Warped Tour in 2010. He has endorsements with Sabian, Spaun Drums, and Duallist Drum Pedals.

== Early life ==
Prestup was born in Pequannock Township, New Jersey. He started playing drums at the age of 10, shortly before his family relocated to Wall Township, New Jersey. He started playing in local bands as a teenager, and featured in the Wall Township High School Marching Band as a percussionist.

While in high school, Prestup studied drums under Shadow Gallery drummer Joe Nevolo. After high school, Dan attended The Collective School of Music in New York City, graduating in 2008.

== Career ==
=== World's Fastest Drummer (2004-2005) ===
Dan Prestup first emerged on the national drumming scene at the 2004 NAMM Show in Nashville, Tennessee, when he entered the World's Fastest Drummer competition. Dan finished 4th in the Fastest Hands category. His drumometer reading of 1,031 strokes is recognized as the 21st fastest performance in the world to date. While Prestup's performance was impressive, it was the following summer where he would make his breakthrough.

At the 2005 NAMM Show in Indianapolis, Indiana, Prestup entered the World's Fastest Drummer competition. This time, he won the competition in the Fastest Feet category, with a drumometer reading of 858 strokes in 1 minute.

=== Spider Rockets (2006-present) ===
In late 2006, Prestup auditioned for Spider Rockets, and joined the band shortly thereafter. In 2007, Spider Rockets released its second album, Ever After, which the band supported with a national tour alongside Lillian Axe. Dan entered the studio with Spider Rockets for the first time in 2008 to record the band's third album. The self-titled album was released the following year, in May 2009.

In February 2010, Prestup and Spider Rockets toured briefly with Pop Evil before joining the Vans Warped Tour in July. Later that year, in November, Spider Rockets toured with Framing Hanley.

In 2011, Spider Rockets announced via their website that they were recording a new album scheduled for release in 2012. Spider Rockets' newest CD entitled Bitten was released on June 5, 2012. Dan performed on the 2018 release Along Came A Spider before eventually being replaced on live shows by drummer Dale Whitaker. In 2022, Prestup performed on the single Casual Violence.

=== Everdawn, previously known as Midnight Eternal (2014-present) ===
In March 2014, Dan Prestup joined Midnight Eternal alongside Symphony X bass player Mike LePond. In 2016, Midnight Eternal announced their signing with Inner Wound Recordings and Marquee/Avalon for the release of their self-titled debut album. In 2019, the band changed their name to Everdawn after a conflict with former band members.

In 2019, Everdawn released their second studio album, Cleopatra on Sensory Records. In 2022, Everdawn toured on the European leg of Michael Schenker's 50th anniversary tour.

=== Other Projects (2012-present) ===
In 2013, Prestup joined progressive metal band DeadRisen, featuring alongside Symphony X bass player Mike LePond. In 2019, DeadRisen announced their signing with AFM Records, with their debut album releasing in the following year.

In 2014, Dan became the drummer the New Jersey production of Rock Of Ages, featuring Lead Producer of the Broadway production of Rock of Ages, Barry Habib, and American Idol finalist Constantine Maroulis.

In 2022, Prestup formed rock band Aetheria with Everdawn keyboardist Boris Zaks.

== Discography ==
=== Full albums ===
Spider Rockets

- Spider Rockets (2009)
- Bitten (2012)
- Along Came A Spider (2018)

Everdawn (formerly known as Midnight Eternal)

- Midnight Eternal (2016)
- Cleopatra (2021)

DeadRisen

- DeadRisen (2020)

=== Singles/side projects ===
Semi Quaver

- "Kill It" (also feat. Dave Linsk & Joe Comeau) (2011)

Dawn of Dreams

- "Angel Eyes" (also feat. Dan Swanö) (2012)

Aetheria

- "Finders Keepers" (2022)

Spider Rockets

- Casual Violence (2022)

== Awards and endorsements ==
=== Awards ===
- WFD World's Fastest Drummer Extreme Sport Drumming
  - 4th place, Fastest Hands, 2004
  - Winner, Fastest Feet, 2005

=== Endorsements ===
- Sabian cymbals
- Spaun Drums
- Duallist Drum Pedals
