= Heel-and-toe =

Heel-and-toe or heel-toe can mean:

- Heel-and-toe shifting, a driving technique
- Heel-toe technique, a percussion performance technique
- the heel-and-toe polka, a dance
