= Vruk =

The Vruk is a proprietary bass drum pedal design produced by Vruk Corporation. The term vruk also refers to playing techniques associated with this design, and related accessories produced by the corporation for attachment to other brands of pedal.

Proponents claim that the technique gives greater control and in particular allows greater speed.

The name VRUK (capitalised) is also used by Vineyard Records UK.

== Players ==
- Chris Adler
- Tim Waterson
