= Dara Brown =

American news anchor and senior producer for MSNBC.com

- Born: Dara Evans Brown; 1964 or 1965 (age 60–61); U.S.
- Education: New York University
- Occupation: News anchor
- Years active: 2000–present
- Notable credit(s): Early Today; Substitute Anchor (2006–2023); First Look; Host (2006–2023)
- Spouse: Matthew Schmid (divorced)
- Parent(s): Karen Peterson Brown; David E. Brown
- Family: 1 son Hayden, 1 daughter Victoria

Dara Brown was a news anchor and senior producer for MSNBC.com. In 2006, she became an alternating host of Early Today on NBC and First Look on MSNBC. She is currently a news anchor for NEWS12 New Jersey.

== Biography ==
Born Dara Evans Brown, she is the daughter of Karen (née Peterson) and David E. Brown. Dara has a son named Hayden, and a daughter named Victoria. As a child, Brown starred as the title character in the first national tour of the musical Annie. Brown graduated in 1983 from Wall High School in Wall Township, New Jersey. She is a graduate of New York University.

In 1999, she married Matthew Schmid in a Lutheran ceremony in Manasquan, New Jersey. The pair divorced in 2014.
