= Wall Township Public Schools =

School district in Monmouth County, New Jersey, US

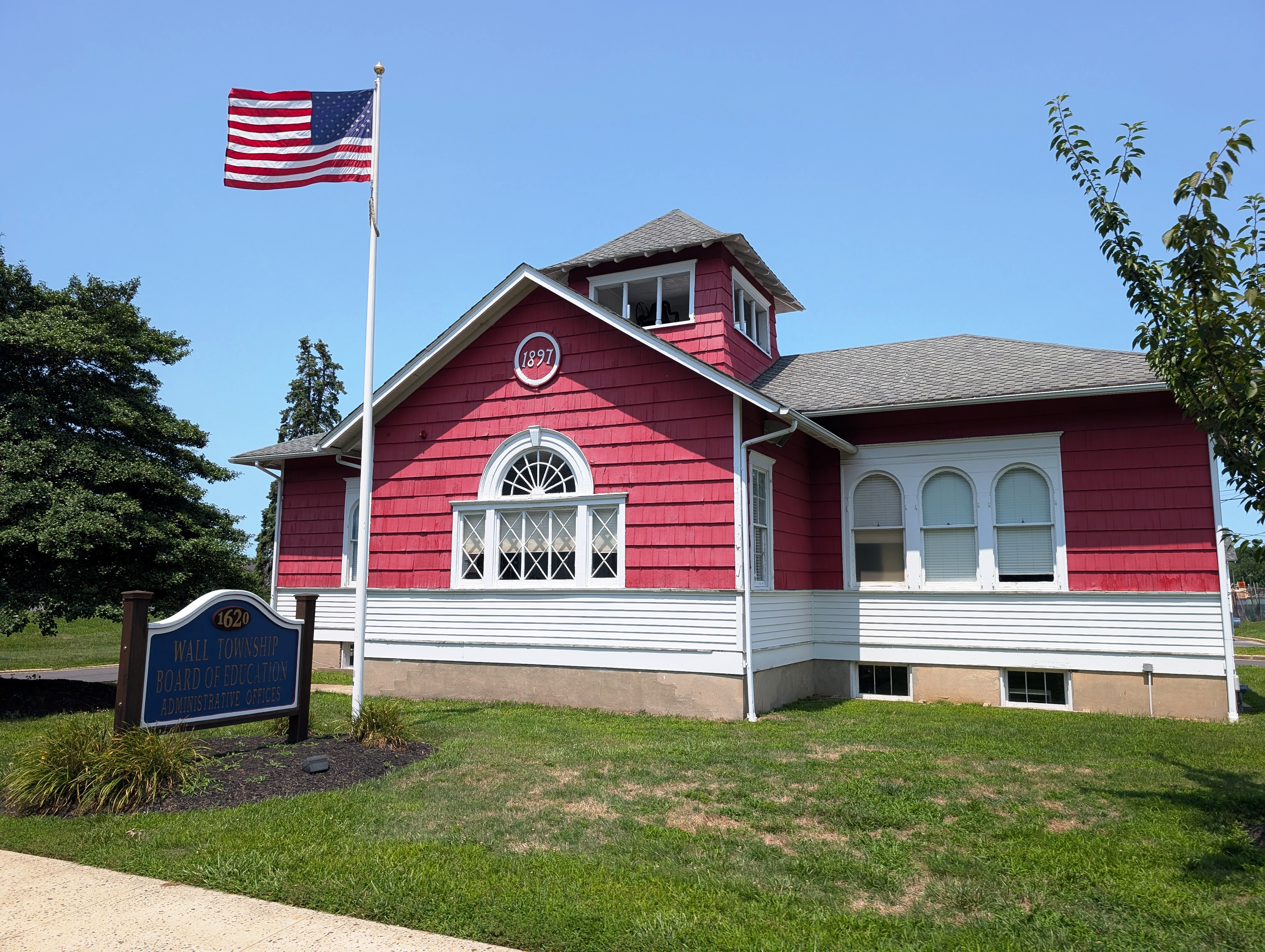
- District administrative offices

Address
- 1620 18th Avenue Wall Township, Monmouth County, New Jersey, 07719; United States
- Coordinates: 40.17123°N 74.019604°W

District information
- Grades: PreK-12
- Superintendent: Tracy Handerhan
- Business administrator: Brian Smyth
- Schools: 7

Students and staff
- Enrollment: 3,215 (as of 2024–25)
- Faculty: 347.3 FTEs
- Student–teacher ratio: 9.3:1

Other information
- District Factor Group: GH
- Website: www.wallpublicschools.org
Ind.	Per pupil	District spending	Rank (*)	K-12 average	%± vs. average
1A	Total Spending	$18,657	57	$18,891	−1.2%
1	Budgetary Cost	14,723	58	14,783	−0.4%
2	Classroom Instruction	8,819	56	8,763	0.6%
6	Support Services	2,104	42	2,392	−12.0%
8	Administrative Cost	1,554	70	1,485	4.6%
10	Operations & Maintenance	1,786	66	1,783	0.2%
13	Extracurricular Activities	328	83	268	22.4%
16	Median Teacher Salary	59,300	23	64,043
Data from NJDoE 2014 Taxpayers' Guide to Education Spending. *Of K-12 districts with more than 3,500 students. Lowest spending=1; Highest=103

The Wall Township Public Schools are a comprehensive community public school district that serves students in pre-kindergarten through twelfth grade from Wall Township, in Monmouth County, in the U.S. state of New Jersey.

As of the 2024–25 school year, the district, comprised of seven schools, had an enrollment of 3,215 students and 347.3 classroom teachers (on an FTE basis), for a student–teacher ratio of 9.3:1.

== History ==
Constructed at a cost of $2 million (equivalent to $22.1 million in 2025) and designed to accommodate up to 1,260 students, the district constructed its own high school that opened in September 1959 for grades 7–11 with an enrollment of 900. Students in twelfth grade that year attended Manasquan High School, which had served Wall Township as part of a sending/receiving relationship that was ended due to overcrowding at the Manasquan school.

The district had been classified by the New Jersey Department of Education as being in District Factor Group "GH", the third-highest of eight groupings. District Factor Groups organize districts statewide to allow comparison by common socioeconomic characteristics of the local districts. From lowest socioeconomic status to highest, the categories are A, B, CD, DE, FG, GH, I and J.

== Schools ==
Schools in the district (with 2024–25 enrollment data from the National Center for Education Statistics) are:

Special education

- Wall Primary School with 73 students in grades PreK
  - Samantha Bagarozza, principal

Elementary schools

- Allenwood Elementary School with 381 students in grades K–5
  - James Sterenczak, principal
- Central Elementary School with 494 students in grades K–5
  - Efstratios Monafis, principal
- Old Mill Elementary School with 396 students in grades K–5
  - Jill Antoniello, principal
- West Belmar Elementary School with 171 students in grades K–5
  - Anthony Abeal, principal

Middle school

- Wall Intermediate School with 755 students in grades 6–8
  - Eric Laughlin, principal

High school

- Wall High School with 924 students in grades 9–12
  - Kevin Davis, principal

== Administration ==
Core members of the district's administration are:

- Tracy Handerhan, superintendent
- Brian Smyth, business administrator and board secretary

== Board of education ==
The district's board of education, composed of nine members, sets policy and oversees the fiscal and educational operation of the district through its administration. As a Type II school district, the board's trustees are elected directly by voters to serve three-year terms of office on a staggered basis, with three seats up for election each year held (since 2012) as part of the November general election. The board appoints a superintendent to oversee the district's day-to-day operations and a business administrator to supervise the business functions of the district.
