= Tom Kain =

American soccer player (born 1963)

Personal information
- Date of birth: July 1, 1963 (age 63)
- Place of birth: United States
- Position: Midfielder

Youth career
- 1979–1980: Wall Soccer Atoms
- 1979–1980: Wall Crimson Knights

College career
Years	Team	Apps	(Gls)
1981–1985	Duke Blue Devils		

Senior career*
Years	Team	Apps	(Gls)
1986–1987	Union Solingen	0	(0)
1987–1991	Kansas City Comets (indoor)	128	(12)

International career
1986–1987	United States	5	(0)
- * Club domestic league appearances and goals

Tom Kain (born July 1, 1963) is an American businessman and former soccer player. He was the director of sports marketing at Nike. A midfielder, he played collegiate soccer at the Duke University where he was named as the top collegiate player winner in the 1985 Hermann Trophy. He also earned five caps with the U.S. national team in 1986 and 1987.

== Youth career ==
Kain grew up in Wall Township, New Jersey and graduated from Wall High School in New Jersey in 1980. While there he wore number 7, which the school has retired. Wall High School won the New Jersey Group III state championship all three years he played. He had 56 goals and had 40 assists during his junior and senior years at Wall. In 1999, he was named by The Star-Ledger as one of the top ten New Jersey high school soccer players of the 1980s. After high school, Kain played for Duke University. His outstanding play for the Blue Devils led to his selection as a 1982 second team and 1983, 1984 and 1985 first team All American. In 1985, he won the Hermann Trophy as the outstanding men's collegiate soccer player. His school record of 51 career goals stood until broken by Ali Curtis in 2000. During his tenure with the Blue Devils, the men's soccer team went 68–13–7. In 1996, Duke University inducted Kain into its Athletics Hall of Fame.

Kain is one of 22 college players to be part of the 40-40 club, having both 40 goals and 40 assists in their college career.

== Professional career ==
After graduating from Duke, Kain achieved a remarkable first, the first American born player to play professionally in Germany. He spent one year at Second Division club Union Solingen, but never played a game. He had been the number one selection, by the New York Express in the 1986 Major Indoor Soccer League draft. After seeing no playing time in Germany, and suffering from a foot injury, he returned to the United States in the spring of 1987 where the Kansas City Comets had purchased his contract rights from the bankrupt Express. He played for the Comets until his retirement in February 1991 in order to pursue business opportunities.

== International career ==
In 1981, Kain was a member of the U.S. U-20 national team at the U-20 World Championship. The U.S. went 0-1-2 in group play and did not qualify for the second round. He was also a member of the U.S. team at the 1987 Pan American Games. Kain played six games with the United States men's national soccer team between 1986 and 1987. However, he has only 5 official caps as his last game with the team, a September 5, 1987 Olympic Qualifier is not considered a full international.

== Post-playing career ==
Kain retired from active playing at the age of 27 while with Kansas City and was hired by Adidas. He steadily rose through the company's ranks and became its Director of U.S. Soccer by his mid-thirties. Nike eventually lured Kain away from Adidas.

His success at Adidas and Nike led to SoccerAmerica selecting him as their #24 most influential person in U.S. soccer.

Kain departed Nike on May 8, 2018, as the result of investigation into workplace behavior at the company. Eleven senior managers left Nike as of May 8.
