= Drumometer =

Drum stroke counter

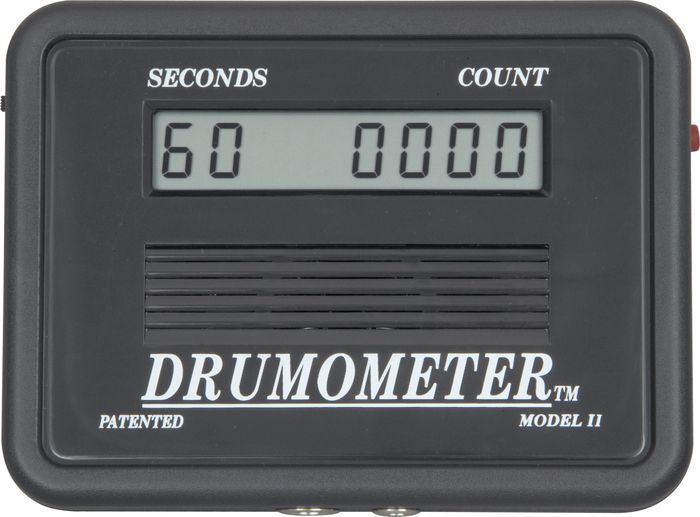

A drumometer is an electronic device invented by Boo McAfee and drummer/electrical engineer, Craig A. Kestner (a.k.a. Craig Alan), that is used to count drum strokes.

Drumometer is patented technology protected by US Patent #6,545,207.

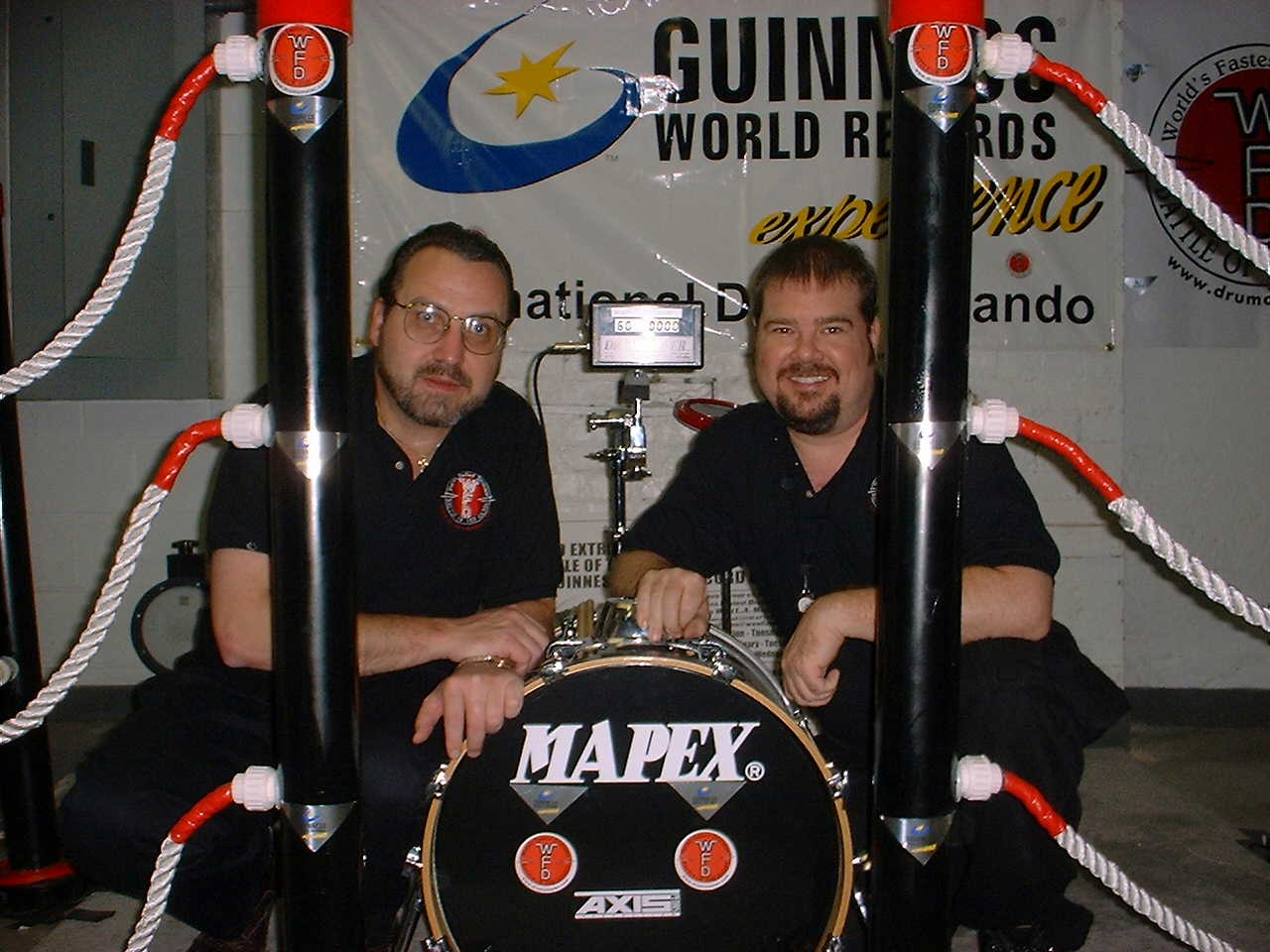
Boo McAfee (l) and Craig Alan (r) circa 2001. Photographer unknown

== Official status ==
The Drumometer is accepted by Guinness World Records and the WFD World's Fastest Drummer Extreme Sport Drumming organization as the official device used to determine the World's Fastest Drummer. WFD World's Fastest Drummer Extreme Sport Drumming is a sporting event that centers around the use of the Drumometer.

== 2015 Legal Filings-Defending the Drumometer Patent US #6,545,207 ==
McAfee has filed patent infringement lawsuits in Chicago against Guitar Center, Ahead Products, Inc. and Cherub Technology Inc., who sell a similar drum stroke counting device, and Yamaha Corporation of America, who has incorporated a drum stroke counting feature in its popular line of DTX electronic drum kits.

Craig left Drumometer in 2007 to continue a career in engineering but still owns the first Drumometer prototype affectionately known as Frankenstein.

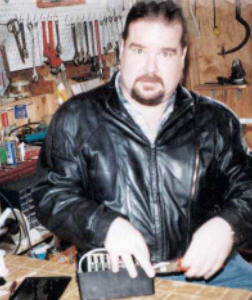
Craig Alan building the first Drumometer prototype affectionately known as Frankenstein. Photo by Ron Kestner

Dowell has filed three patent infringement lawsuits for McAfee in the United States District Court for the Northern District of Illinois, the first against Guitar Center and Yamaha on October 27, 2015 (15-cv-9555) and two more against Ahead Products, Inc. (15-cv-10395) and Cherub Technology Inc. (15-cv-10403) on November 18, 2015.

== WFD competitions ==
Musical genres such as death metal, country, jazz, and screamo have battled for dominance in the various categories.
