= Tim Waterson =

Canadian drummer

- Born: May 12, 1961 (age 65)
- Origin: Canada
- Occupation: Drummer
- Instrument: Bass drum

Tim Waterson is a Canadian drummer who holds the world record for the fastest number of double strokes on a bass drum using a double pedal, with a record of 1,407 in one minute (January 22, 2002).

== Career ==
Waterson started an organization to promote speed drumming as a sport. In 2006 he performed 1,075 single-stroke rolls on a bass drum in 60 seconds.

In 2007 Waterson released a two-DVD set, Techniques, Motions and Applications for Bass Drum Playing.

Waterson uses the heel-toe technique and also invented the pump technique for fast single strokes. His use of the Vruk heel pedal system enables him to perform a modified version of heel-toe playing. Tim is profiled in the book Believe the Unbelievable by Bartley Press.
