= Mike "Machine" Mallais =

Canadian drummer (born 1979)

- Born: 1979 (age 46–47); Miramichi, New Brunswick, Canada
- Genres: Heavy metal
- Occupation: Drummer
- Website: www.mikemachine.com

Michael "Mike Machine" Mallais (born in Miramichi, New Brunswick on November 23, 1979) is a Canadian drummer. He started playing improvised drums at the age of two and subsequently a real kit at the age of five after being introduced to heavy metal bands. In 2007 Mike won the "World's Fastest Drummer" competition, "Battle of the Feet" category. Michael played his last show with Jeremy Reid & The Machine on Feb. 28, 2013. His current band is named Mosquito and plays out of Langley, British Columbia.

== World's Fastest Drummer ==
=== Awards ===
- The 2005 Maritime WFD Champion - Halifax, Nova Scotia, Canada,
- The 2006 Canadian WFD Champion - Quebec City, Quebec, Canada,
- The 2007 WFD Winter World Finals Battle of the Feet Champ – Anaheim, California,
- The World's Fastest Drummer (Battle of the Feet category),

=== Statistics ===
- 1,034 single strokes (60 seconds)
- 4,595 single strokes (5 minutes)
- 13,309 single strokes (15 minutes)
