= Heel-toe technique =

Foot technique for drummers

Heel-toe technique is a foot technique that drummers use to be able to play single strokes or double strokes on the bass drum, hi-hat, or other pedals.

== Origin ==
The heel-toe foot technique was pioneered by drummers of the big band era. The application most commonly used for this technique at that time was a rocking motion that assisted the drummer in keeping solid time on the hi-hat, while simultaneously playing timpani type floor tom rhythms or swinging the ride cymbal. Early video footage of Buddy Rich, along with fellow Big band drummers are seen utilizing this technique in a musical setting.

== Present day ==
In modern times, this method has been brought into mainstream knowledge through the work of James Davenport (Warpath), who expanded the heel-toe approach beyond its traditional use and formalised it into a repeatable system. Davenport’s playing places multiple-stroke kick drumming—doubles, triples, and extended rolls—at the centre of his style rather than as an occasional flourish. By structuring the technique into a systematic approach, Davenport demonstrated that the heel-toe motion could serve not just for bursts of speed, but as a core rhythmic foundation adaptable to long passages of music.

His development of this approach influenced its adoption into heavy metal by drummers such as Chris Adler, Jared Klein (Rivers of Nihil) and John Longstreth (Origin), where the heel-toe technique is used to execute continuous stroke rolls on both feet. Typically these rolls consist of double and triple strikes, but in Davenport’s method they can be extended into longer, flowing phrases, effectively allowing the feet to perform rudimental patterns previously limited to the hands.

The technique has also crossed into electronic-influenced genres, most notably drum and bass, where artists like Jojo Mayer have incorporated it into high-tempo live playing. Tim Waterson further showcased its potential by using a hybrid version of the heel-toe technique to set the double-stroke world record for feet in the World’s Fastest Drummer competition with a score of 1,407 doubles in 60 seconds.

Davenport is recognised as the first drummer to construct a complete playing style based on multiple-stroke kick drumming, using the heel-toe technique as its foundation. His demonstrations and performances highlighted how economy of motion and precision could be combined to achieve both speed and endurance, influencing subsequent generations of drummers to explore the method not only as a tool for speed but as a legitimate form of musical expression.

== Description ==
The technique allows a drummer to play two strokes in a single motion similar to the Moeller method for hand technique. It consists of two parts:

1. Begin from a position where the heel of the foot is suspended off the floor, and the ball of the foot is barely touching the footboard (the heel can be a little higher off the floor than the ball of the foot if that works for you). Keeping the foot relaxed, step down with the sole of the foot almost parallel to the floor, onto the footboard in a flam motion where first the ball of the foot strikes and depresses the footboard, and a fraction of a second later the heel lands in its usual place on the floor. Despite the flam motion, you'll only actuate the beater to play one stroke. The front part of the foot is not depressing the pedal hard in this position, so the beater is free to bounce naturally back ready for the second stroke.
2. Using the hip flexors and calf, raise the upper leg while snapping the foot forward/down to actuate the second stroke. The ball of the foot snaps down, the heel comes up, and the ball of the foot (or toes) completes the second stroke. Your foot is back where you started, ready for another cycle.

The term heel-toe is used because of the appearance of the heel pushing down on the pedal followed by the toe. In actuality, it's the ball of the foot (or toes) both times, and depending on the relative size of the feet and pedal, and the drummer's individual technique, the heel may not touch the pedal or ground at all.

The technique is an asset when playing double kick pedals or two bass drums as it allows for drum rudiments to be played with the feet. When mastered, drummers can use the method to play complex patterns in the same manner as the hands in addition to rolling the bass drum.

- Pros - Efficiency: increased speed and endurance, with less leg motion and effort required compared to single strokes for the same BPM.
- Cons - Limited volume, as a result of not using more of the larger leg muscles in the early stages, and uneven volume, particularly when beginning to learn this technique.

The limited volume is due to muscle fatigue if the knee and upper leg are not used to power the second stroke. Often this will cause cramp. It takes years of deliberate practice to develop the muscles needed to even out the volume. For this reason, it can be especially convenient to use triggers when using this method.
