= Spider Rockets =

American rock band

- Origin: New Jersey, United States
- Genres: Rock
- Years active: 1998–present
- Labels: P-Dog Records, Locomotive Music, FireRock Music Group
- Members: Helena Cos; Johnny Nap; Dan Prestup; AJ Garcia
- Website: www.spiderrockets.com

Spider Rockets is an American rock band formed in New Jersey, United States, by band members Helena Cos and Johnny Nap. They have been compared to such acts as Halestorm, No Doubt, Soundgarden, the Red Hot Chili Peppers and L7. Originally formed in 1998, the group has released Flipped Off (2000), which debuted in CMJ's Top 20 radio adds, and Ever After (2007), which debuted in CMJ's Loud Rock adds. and the self-titled Spider Rockets (2009). Flipped Off, Ever After, and Preview EP were recorded by Martin Bisi . Spider Rockets (2009) was recorded with Eric Rachel. The band has also toured with Lillian Axe, Saliva, Trapt, Pop Evil, performed on The Vans Warped Tour, toured with Framing Hanley and performed at the Popkomm Festival in Berlin, Germany. Spider Rockets' release, Bitten, was the third most added record in the country on CMJ Loud Rock chart. The CD also garnered a TOP 10 Hard Rock release of the year by Metal Odyssey. Also, the group's track, “Going Down,” became WWE darling, Charlotte Flair's (daughter of Ric Flair), walk-out and victory song during her 2014 season.

2016 marked Spider Rockets’ return into the studio for their fifth album, this time with producer Dan Malsch and Along Came a Spider, the group's latest album, was subsequently released in January 2018. Spider Rockets toured with Puddle of Mudd, Tantric, Saving Abel to promote Along Came a Spider.

The group’s collection of official music videos, including Monster of Your Dreams, Casual Violence, Going Down, and Rip Your Heart Out, have collectively racked up over three million views on YouTube and have been lauded with multiple film festival top awards.

Spider Rockets toured in 2023 as support for Otep to promote its latest single and video for Monster of Your Dreams.

The band's album, 'Dirty and Bad,' was released in 2025 on FireRock Music Group and has been climbing the radio charts, having achieved a top 10 Add on the SMR Chart.

== Discography ==
- Flipped Off (2000)
- Preview EP (2003)
- Ever After (2007)
- Spider Rockets (2009)
- Bitten (2012)
- Along Came a Spider (2018)
- Dirty and Bad (2025)

== Members ==
- Helena Cos
- Johnny Nap
- Dan Prestup
- AJ Garcia
