= Avon School =

Avon School may refer to:

- Avon School, a primary school in Stratford, New Zealand
- Avon High School (disambiguation)

== See also ==
- Avon School District (disambiguation)
