= Spring Lake School District =

School district in Monmouth County, New Jersey, US

Address
- 411 Tuttle Avenue Spring Lake, Monmouth County, New Jersey, 07762; United States
- Coordinates: 40.157642°N 74.030169°W

District information
- Grades: Pre-K to 8
- Superintendent: Stephen LaValva
- Business administrator: Joanette Femia
- Schools: 1

Students and staff
- Enrollment: 142 (as of 2023–24)
- Faculty: 22.5 FTEs
- Student–teacher ratio: 6.3:1

Other information
- District Factor Group: I
- Website: www.slboe.org
Ind.	Per pupil	District spending	Rank (*)	K-8 average	%± vs. average
1A	Total Spending	$21,855	52	$18,891	15.7%
1	Budgetary Cost	21,202	66	14,159	49.7%
2	Classroom Instruction	10,713	58	8,659	23.7%
6	Support Services	5,110	69	2,167	135.8%
8	Administrative Cost	1,848	60	1,547	19.5%
10	Operations & Maintenance	3,225	65	1,612	100.1%
13	Extracurricular Activities	296	58	104	184.6%
16	Median Teacher Salary	62,085	57	61,136
Data from NJDoE 2014 Taxpayers' Guide to Education Spending. *Of K-8 districts with up to 69 students. Lowest spending=1; Highest=71

Spring Lake School District is a public school district that serves students in pre-kindergarten through eighth grade in Spring Lake, in Monmouth County, in the U.S. state of New Jersey.

As of the 2023–24 school year, the district, comprised of one school, had an enrollment of 142 students and 22.5 classroom teachers (on an FTE basis), for a student–teacher ratio of 6.3:1.

Students attending public high school for ninth through twelfth grades are assigned to Manasquan High School as part of a sending/receiving relationship with the Manasquan Public Schools. Manasquan High School also serves students from Avon-by-the-Sea, Belmar, Brielle, Lake Como, Sea Girt and Spring Lake Heights who attend Manasquan High School as part of sending/receiving relationships with their respective districts. As of the 2023–24 school year, the high school had an enrollment of 945 students and 81.2 classroom teachers (on an FTE basis), for a student–teacher ratio of 11.6:1.

Students may also attend one of the magnet schools in the Monmouth County Vocational School District — Marine Academy of Science and Technology, Academy of Allied Health & Science, High Technology High School, Biotechnology High School, and Communications High School.

== History ==
In 1897, the borough's first public school was built at the corner of Warren Avenue and Fifth Avenue. Later, in the 1950s, the building served as a Masonic meeting room, after the school was relocated to Tuttle Avenue. On May 10, 1962, the Spring Lake public school was renamed to honor its retiring principal, H.W. Mountz.

In the 2016–17 school year, Spring Lake had the 43rd smallest enrollment of any school district in the state, with 197 students.

The district had been classified by the New Jersey Department of Education as being in District Factor Group "I", the second-highest of eight groupings. District Factor Groups organize districts statewide to allow comparison by common socioeconomic characteristics of the local districts. From lowest socioeconomic status to highest, the categories are A, B, CD, DE, FG, GH, I and J.

== Awards and recognition ==
In 2015, H.W. Mountz School was one of 15 schools in New Jersey, and one of nine public schools, recognized as a National Blue Ribbon School in the exemplary high performing category by the United States Department of Education.

In 2002, the science teacher for sixth to eighth grade students, John Bormann, received a National Educator Award from the Milken Family Foundation.

On June 5, 2006, Governor of New Jersey Jon Corzine visited H. W. Mountz School to congratulate Katharine Close for winning the Scripps National Spelling Bee.

== School ==
H. W. Mountz Elementary School had an enrollment of 141 students in grades PreK–8 in the 2023–24 school year.

- Dan Layton, principal

== Administration ==
Core members of the school's administration are:

- Stephen LaValva, superintendent and school business administrator
- Dan Layton, board secretary

== Board of education ==
The district's board of education, comprised of five elected members, sets policy and oversees the fiscal and educational operation of the district through its administration. As a Type II school district, the board's trustees are elected directly by voters to serve three-year terms of office on a staggered basis, with either one or two seats up for election each year held (since 2012) as part of the November general election. The board appoints a superintendent to oversee the district's day-to-day operations and a business administrator to supervise the business functions of the district.

== Notable alumni ==
- Chris Candido (1972–2005), professional wrestler.
- Johnny Candido (born 1982), professional wrestler.
