= Oliver Huff Brown =

American politicians from New Jersey (1852–1924)

Member of the New Jersey Senate from Monmouth County
- In office 1903–1912
- Preceded by: Charles Asa Francis
- Succeeded by: John W. Slocum

Member of the New Jersey General Assembly from Monmouth County
- In office 1897–1898

Mayor of Spring Lake, New Jersey
- In office 1890 – April 2, 1924

Personal details
- Born: December 12, 1852 Farmingdale, New Jersey
- Died: April 2, 1924 (aged 71) Spring Lake, New Jersey
- Party: Republican

Oliver Huff Brown (December 12, 1852 – April 2, 1924) was an American businessman and Republican Party politician who represented Monmouth County, New Jersey in the New Jersey General Assembly from 1897 to 1898 and the New Jersey Senate from 1903 to 1912.

== Early life and business career ==
Oliver Huff Brown was born on December 12, 1852, in Farmingdale, New Jersey, to Peter and Sarah (née Megill) Brown. His father was a Scottish immigrant who fought for the Union army and was wounded at the Battle of Cold Harbor before dying in Libby Prison.

Brown was educated in the local public schools.

== Business career ==
After graduating school in 1871, Brown worked as a clerk at a country store for two years before going to work for John A. Githen in Asbury Park as a business manager for eight years, which required him to frequently travel internationally to Europe. In 1881 or 1882, he established his own business in Spring Lake, selling furniture, fine china, and bric-à-brac glass. The business grew rapidly and he subsequently opened branches in Lakewood Township in 1891 and later in Asbury Park. By his death in 1924, he was one of the leading furniture sellers on the coast.

Following his success in business, Brown had a length career in finance. He served as president of the First National Bank of Spring Lake and First National Bank of Lakewood and as a director of banks and trusts throughout Monmouth County and Lakewood.

He was also the owner of several hotels on the Jersey Shore and in the White Mountains at Jefferson, New Hampshire.

== Political career ==
Through his business activities and progressive views, Brown was elected as the mayor of Spring Lake in 1892; he continued to serve as mayor following its merger with North Spring Lake and Como in 1903 until his death in 1924. Following a debilitating stroke around 1920, he was unable to perform the duties of his office and council president Daniel Hills served as acting mayor.

In 1916, Brown played a leading role in responding to a wave of shark attacks along the Jersey Shore. After Charles Bruder was attacked and killed by a shark in Spring Lake, Brown and the borough council held an emergency meeting to publicly announce that no expense would be spared to protect the borough's beach.

In 1896, he was elected to the New Jersey General Assembly as a member of the Republican Party, representing Monmouth County, and he served for a one-year term. He was a delegate to the 1900 Republican National Convention. In the Assembly, he introduced a bill to authorize the opening of Shark River.

In 1902, Brown was nominated to represent all of Monmouth County in the New Jersey Senate. He defeated Hugh S. Kinmouth, an Asbury Park doctor, in the general election. He was re-elected in 1905 against Kinmouth and defeated Freehold judge Ruliff F. Lawrence in 1908. In 1911, he was defeated for re-election by John W. Slocum.

== Personal life and death ==
Brown never married. He was a member of the Freemasons, the Benevolent and Protective Order of Elks, the Shriners, and the Knights of the Golden Eagle.

In 1921 or 1922, Brown suffered a stroke which left him paralyzed, and he never fully recovered. He died at his Spring Lake home on April 2, 1924. The borough flag was lowered to half mast, and his body lay in state at the Spring Lake community center, which he had donated to the borough as a memorial to World War I veterans.
