= Avon School District =

Avon School District may refer to:

- Avon School District (Massachusetts)
- Avon School District (New Jersey)
- Avon School District (South Dakota), also known as Avon School District 4-1
- Abingdon-Avon Community Unit School District 276, a public school district in Abingdon, Illinois
- Avon Public Schools, a public school district in Avon, Connecticut
- Avon Central School District, a public school district in Avon, New York
- Avon Local School District, a public school district in Avon, Ohio
- Avon Community School Corporation, a public school district in Avon, Indiana
