= Farmingdale, New Jersey =

Borough in Monmouth County, New Jersey, US

- Borough
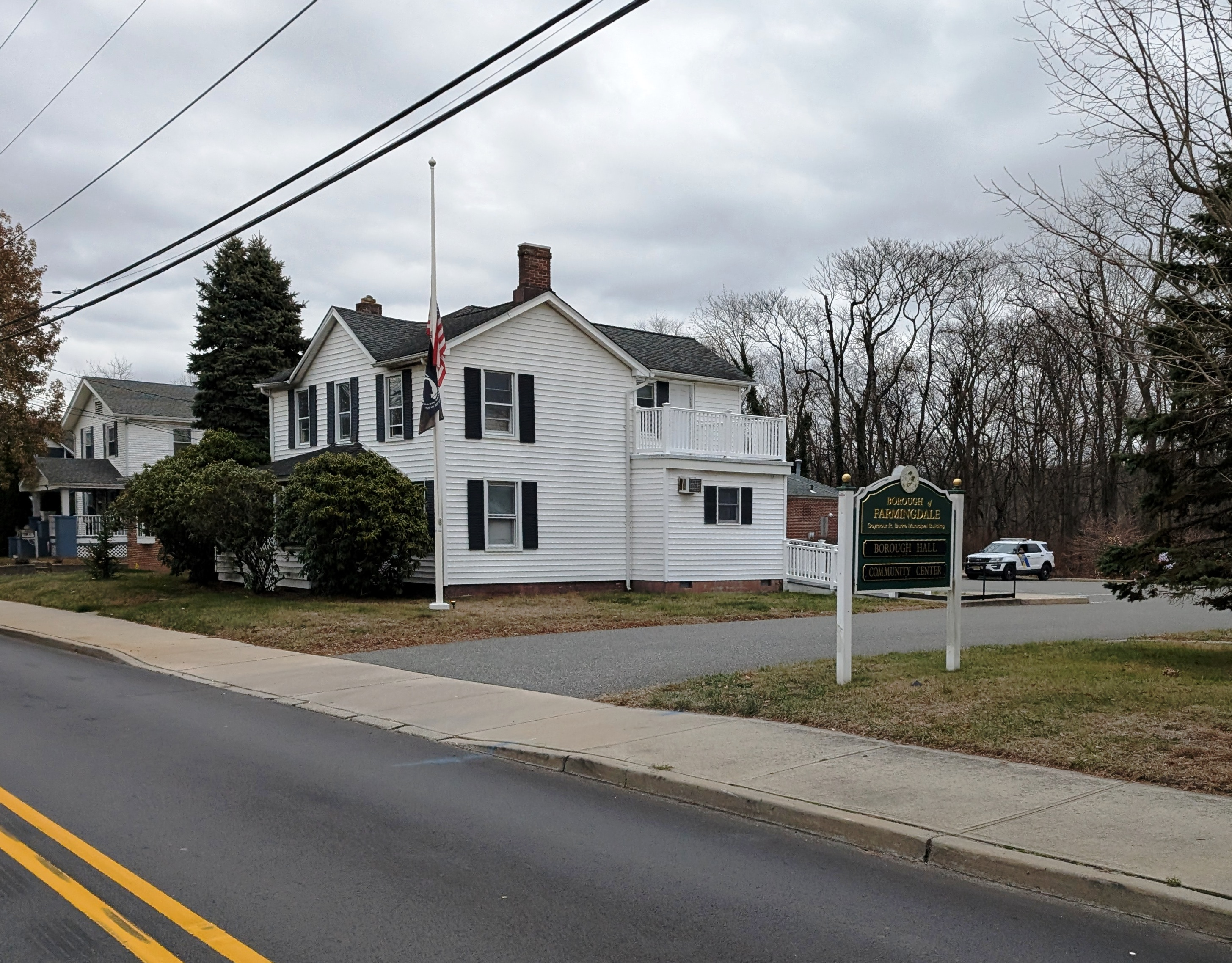
- Municipal building

- Seal
- Motto: Today's Town with Yesterday's Touch
- Location of Farmingdale in Monmouth County highlighted in red (left). Inset map: Location of Monmouth County in New Jersey highlighted in orange (right).

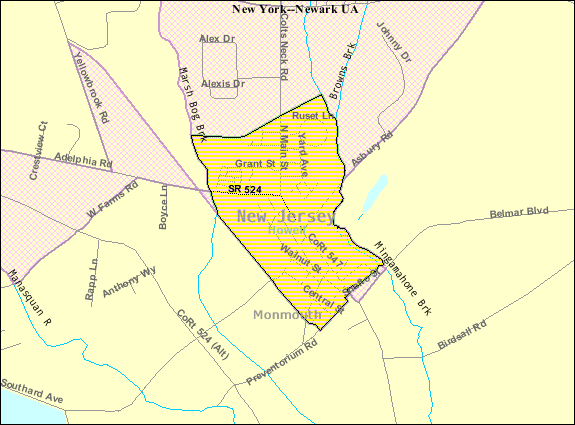
- Census Bureau map of Farmingdale, New Jersey

- Location in Monmouth County Location in New Jersey Location in the United States
- Coordinates: 40.198357°N 74.170082°W
- Country: United States
- State: New Jersey
- County: Monmouth
- Incorporated: April 8, 1903

Government
  - Type: Borough
  - Body: Borough Council
  - Mayor: James A. Daly (R, term ends December 31, 2027)
  - Municipal clerk: Corinne DiCorcia Williams

Area
  - Total: 0.52 sq mi (1.35 km^{2})
  - Land: 0.52 sq mi (1.35 km^{2})
  - Water: 0 sq mi (0.00 km^{2}) 0.00%
  - Rank: 547th of 565 in state 48th of 53 in county
- Elevation: 75 ft (23 m)

Population (2020)
  - Total: 1,504
  - Estimate (2023): 1,491
  - Rank: 511th of 565 in state 46th of 53 in county
  - Density: 2,890/sq mi (1,120/km^{2})
  - Rank: 224th of 565 in state 27th of 53 in county
- Time zone: UTC−05:00 (Eastern (EST))
  - Summer (DST): UTC−04:00 (Eastern (EDT))
- ZIP Code: 07727
- Area code: 732 exchanges: 751, 919, 938
- FIPS code: 3402522950
- GNIS feature ID: 0885218
- Website: www.farmingdaleborough.org

Farmingdale is a borough in Monmouth County, in the U.S. state of New Jersey. As of the 2020 United States census, the borough's population was 1,504, an increase of 175 (+13.2%) from the 2010 census count of 1,329, which in turn reflected a decline of 258 (−16.3%) from the 1,587 counted in the 2000 census.

Farmingdale was incorporated as a borough by an act of the New Jersey Legislature on April 8, 1903, from portions of Howell Township. The borough is named for its location at the center of an agricultural area.

== Geography ==
According to the United States Census Bureau, the borough had a total area of 0.52 square miles (1.35 km^{2}), all of which was land.

The borough is completely surrounded by Howell Township, making it part of 21 pairs of "doughnut towns" in the state, where one municipality entirely surrounds another.

== Demographics ==
Historical population
Census	Pop.	Note	%±
1910	416		—
1920	474		13.9%
1930	629		32.7%
1940	609		−3.2%
1950	755		24.0%
1960	959		27.0%
1970	1,148		19.7%
1980	1,348		17.4%
1990	1,462		8.5%
2000	1,587		8.5%
2010	1,329		−16.3%
2020	1,504		13.2%
2023 (est.)	1,491	▼	−0.9%
Population sources: 1910–1920; 1910 1910–1930 1940–2000; 2000 2010 2020

=== 2010 census ===
The 2010 United States census counted 1,329 people, 547 households, and 342 families in the borough. The population density was 2,547.7 per square mile (983.7/km^{2}). There were 578 housing units at an average density of 1,108.0 per square mile (427.8/km^{2}). The racial makeup was 89.62% (1,191) White, 2.86% (38) Black or African American, 0.45% (6) Native American, 3.16% (42) Asian, 0.00% (0) Pacific Islander, 1.73% (23) from other races, and 2.18% (29) from two or more races. Hispanic or Latino of any race were 6.92% (92) of the population.

Of the 547 households, 28.9% had children under the age of 18; 45.2% were married couples living together; 12.1% had a female householder with no husband present and 37.5% were non-families. Of all households, 28.2% were made up of individuals and 6.8% had someone living alone who was 65 years of age or older. The average household size was 2.43 and the average family size was 3.05.

21.5% of the population were under the age of 18, 8.2% from 18 to 24, 28.3% from 25 to 44, 31.6% from 45 to 64, and 10.4% who were 65 years of age or older. The median age was 39.8 years. For every 100 females, the population had 103.8 males. For every 100 females ages 18 and older there were 97.9 males.

The Census Bureau's 2006–2010 American Community Survey showed that (in 2010 inflation-adjusted dollars) median household income was $63,191 (with a margin of error of +/− $2,838) and the median family income was $69,688 (+/− $10,093). Males had a median income of $56,518 (+/− $4,270) versus $36,625 (+/− $5,921) for females. The per capita income for the borough was $31,425 (+/− $2,251). About 2.6% of families and 4.0% of the population were below the poverty line, including 5.6% of those under age 18 and 9.6% of those age 65 or over.

=== 2000 census ===
As of the 2000 United States census there were 1,587 people, 625 households, and 406 families residing in the borough. The population density was 2,972.2 inhabitants per square mile (1,147.6/km^{2}). There were 638 housing units at an average density of 1,194.9 per square mile (461.4/km^{2}). The racial makeup of the borough was 93.64% White, 1.13% African American, 2.33% Asian, 2.08% from other races, and 0.82% from two or more races. Hispanic or Latino of any race were 3.84% of the population.

There were 625 households, out of which 37.3% had children under the age of 18 living with them, 51.5% were married couples living together, 8.8% had a female householder with no husband present, and 35.0% were non-families. 29.0% of all households were made up of individuals, and 6.6% had someone living alone who was 65 years of age or older. The average household size was 2.54 and the average family size was 3.21.

In the borough the population was spread out, with 27.0% under the age of 18, 7.4% from 18 to 24, 35.5% from 25 to 44, 21.1% from 45 to 64, and 9.0% who were 65 years of age or older. The median age was 35 years. For every 100 females, there were 102.2 males. For every 100 females age 18 and over, there were 107.0 males.

The median income for a household in the borough was $48,889, and the median income for a family was $59,625. Males had a median income of $40,000 versus $27,375 for females. The per capita income for the borough was $21,667. About 5.6% of families and 5.7% of the population were below the poverty line, including 7.0% of those under age 18 and 6.3% of those age 65 or over.

== Government ==
=== Local government ===
Farmingdale is governed under the borough form of New Jersey municipal government, which is used in 218 municipalities (of the 564) statewide, making it the most common form of government in New Jersey. The governing body is comprised of the mayor and the borough council, with all positions elected at-large on a partisan basis as part of the November general election. A mayor is elected directly by the voters to a four-year term of office. The borough council includes six members elected to serve three-year terms on a staggered basis, with two seats coming up for election each year in a three-year cycle. The borough form of government used by Farmingdale is a "weak mayor / strong council" government in which council members act as the legislative body with the mayor presiding at meetings and voting only in the event of a tie. The mayor can veto ordinances subject to an override by a two-thirds majority vote of the council. The mayor makes committee and liaison assignments for council members, and most appointments are made by the mayor with the advice and consent of the council.

As of 2025, the mayor of Farmingdale is Republican James A. Daly, whose term of office ends December 31, 2027; Daly had taken office after having been named as acting mayor following the March 2016 death of John P. "Jay" Morgan. Members of the Borough Council are Council President Patricia A. Linszky (R, 2027), Erich Brandl (R, 2026), Kaaren L. Corallo (R, 2027), George J. Dyevoich (R, 2025), Colleen Sagan (R, 2025) and Don H. Steinfeld (R, 2026).

In July 2020, the borough council appointed Colleen Sagan to fill the seat expiring in December 2022 that had been held by Michael J. Romano until his death two months earlier. Sagan served on an interim basis until the November 2020 general election when she was chosen to serve the balance of the term of office.

The 2012 elections included the election of all six council seats in the wake of the resignation of all six council members during the previous year.

=== Federal, state and county representation ===
Farmingdale is located in the 4th Congressional District and is part of New Jersey's 30th state legislative district.

For the 119th United States Congress, New Jersey's 4th congressional district is represented by Chris Smith (R, Manchester Township). New Jersey is represented in the United States Senate by Democrats Cory Booker (Newark, term ends 2027) and Andy Kim (Moorestown, term ends 2031).

For the 2026–2027 session, the 30th legislative district of the New Jersey Legislature is represented in the State Senate by Robert Singer (R, Lakewood Township) and in the General Assembly by Sean T. Kean (R, Wall Township) and Avi Schnall (D, Lakewood Township).

Monmouth County is governed by a Board of County Commissioners composed of five members who are elected at-large to serve three-year terms of office on a staggered basis, with either one or two seats up for election each year as part of the November general election. At an annual reorganization meeting held in the beginning of January, the board selects one of its members to serve as director and another as deputy director.

As of 2025, Monmouth County's Commissioners are Director Thomas A. Arnone (R, Neptune City, 2025), Susan M. Kiley (R, Hazlet Township, 2027), Erik Anderson (R, Shrewsbury, 2026), Nick DiRocco (R, Wall Township, 2025), and Deputy Director Ross F. Licitra (R, Marlboro Township, 2026).

Constitutional officers elected on a countywide basis are Clerk Christine Giordano Hanlon (R, 2025; Ocean Township), Sheriff Shaun Golden (R, 2025; Howell Township) and Surrogate Rosemarie D. Peters (R, 2026; Middletown Township).

=== Politics ===
United States presidential election results for Farmingdale
Year	Republican		Democratic		Third party(ies)	
Year	No.	%	No.	%	No.	%
2024	511	59.42%	327	38.02%	22	2.56%
2020	501	57.79%	352	40.60%	14	1.61%
2016	426	61.29%	238	34.24%	31	4.46%
2012	364	51.93%	330	47.08%	7	1.00%
2008	360	50.78%	338	47.67%	11	1.55%
2004	424	61.01%	264	37.99%	7	1.01%
2000	329	55.20%	233	39.09%	34	5.70%
1996	191	41.89%	184	40.35%	81	17.76%
1992	262	42.19%	172	27.70%	187	30.11%

As of March 2011, there were a total of 929 registered voters in Farmingdale, of which 166 (17.9%) were registered as Democrats, 325 (35.0%) were registered as Republicans and 436 (46.9%) were registered as Unaffiliated. There were 2 voters registered as Libertarians or Greens.

In the 2012 presidential election, Republican Mitt Romney received 51.9% of the vote (364 cast), ahead of Democrat Barack Obama with 47.1% (330 votes), and other candidates with 1.0% (7 votes), among the 709 ballots cast by the borough's 966 registered voters (8 ballots were spoiled), for a turnout of 73.4%. In the 2008 presidential election, Republican John McCain received 50.1% of the vote (360 cast), ahead of Democrat Barack Obama with 47.1% (338 votes) and other candidates with 1.5% (11 votes), among the 718 ballots cast by the borough's 967 registered voters, for a turnout of 74.3%. In the 2004 presidential election, Republican George W. Bush received 61.0% of the vote (424 ballots cast), outpolling Democrat John Kerry with 38.0% (264 votes) and other candidates with 0.7% (7 votes), among the 695 ballots cast by the borough's 934 registered voters, for a turnout percentage of 74.4.

Gubernatorial election results for Farmingdale
Year	Republican		Democratic		Third party(ies)	
Year	No.	%	No.	%	No.	%
2025	386	56.85%	287	42.27%	6	0.88%
2021	375	64.99%	194	33.62%	8	1.39%
2017	298	61.70%	173	35.82%	12	2.48%
2013	379	75.50%	111	22.11%	12	2.39%
2009	320	66.81%	117	24.43%	42	8.77%
2005	264	64.08%	129	31.31%	19	4.61%

In the 2013 gubernatorial election, Republican Chris Christie received 75.5% of the vote (379 cast), ahead of Democrat Barbara Buono with 22.1% (111 votes), and other candidates with 2.4% (12 votes), among the 514 ballots cast by the borough's 991 registered voters (12 ballots were spoiled), for a turnout of 51.9%. In the 2009 gubernatorial election, Republican Chris Christie received 66.7% of the vote (320 ballots cast), ahead of Democrat Jon Corzine with 24.4% (117 votes), Independent Chris Daggett with 8.1% (39 votes) and other candidates with 0.6% (3 votes), among the 480 ballots cast by the borough's 939 registered voters, yielding a 51.1% turnout.

United States Senate election results for Farmingdale1
Year	Republican		Democratic		Third party(ies)	
Year	No.	%	No.	%	No.	%
2024	474	57.88%	321	39.19%	24	2.93%
2018	368	60.13%	218	35.62%	26	4.25%
2012	362	55.95%	269	41.58%	16	2.47%
2006	233	56.83%	157	38.29%	20	4.88%

United States Senate election results for Farmingdale2
Year	Republican		Democratic		Third party(ies)	
Year	No.	%	No.	%	No.	%
2020	473	55.58%	351	41.25%	27	3.17%
2014	232	55.77%	176	42.31%	8	1.92%
2013	172	61.43%	106	37.86%	2	0.71%
2008	337	54.01%	260	41.67%	27	4.33%

== Education ==
The Farmingdale School District serves public school students in pre-kindergarten through eighth grade at Farmingdale Elementary School. As of the 2022–23 school year, the district, comprised of one school, had an enrollment of 163 students and 24.0 classroom teachers (on an FTE basis), for a student–teacher ratio of 6.8:1. In the 2016–17 school year, Farmingdale had the 34th-smallest enrollment of any school district in the state, with 161 students.

Public school students in ninth through twelfth grades attend Howell High School, as part of the Freehold Regional High School District (FRHSD). The district also serves students from Colts Neck Township, Englishtown, Freehold Borough, Freehold Township, Howell Township, Manalapan Township and Marlboro. As of the 2022–23 school year, the high school had an enrollment of 2,011 students and 133.2 classroom teachers (on an FTE basis), for a student–teacher ratio of 15.1:1. Students may apply to attend one of the district's six specialized learning centers, including the Humanities Learning Center hosted at Howell High School. The FRHSD board of education has nine members, who are elected to three-year terms from each of the constituent districts. Each member is allocated a fraction of a vote that totals to nine points, with Farmingdale allocated one member, who has 0.5 votes.

== Transportation ==
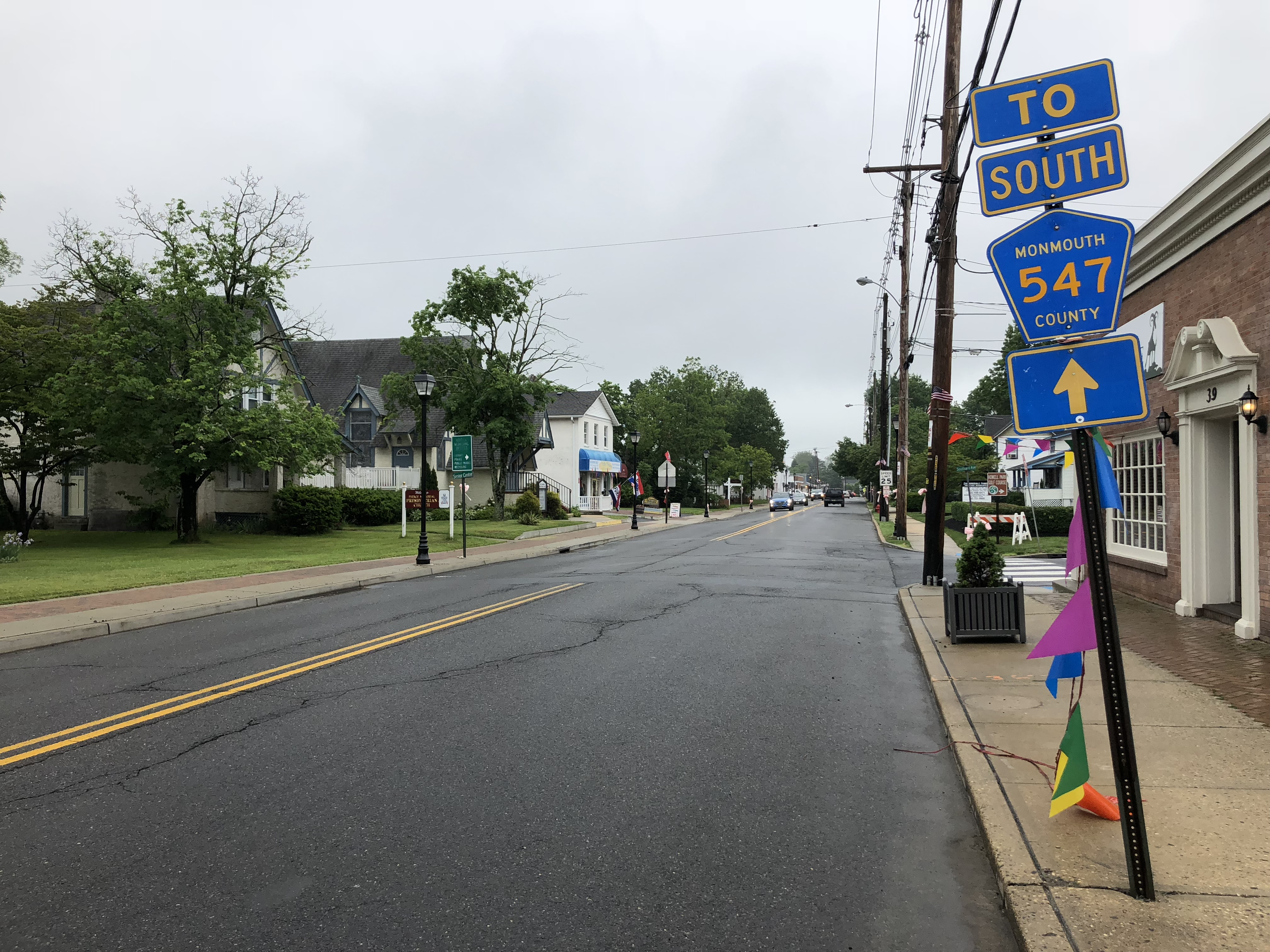
County Route 524 and County Route 547, the main roads through Farmingdale

=== Roads and highways ===
As of May 2010, the borough had a total of 6.89 miles (11.09 km) of roadways, of which 5.30 miles (8.53 km) were maintained by the municipality and 1.59 miles (2.56 km) by Monmouth County.

County Route 547 and County Route 524 are the most prominent roads which pass directly through the borough. Route 33 and Route 34 are the closest state highways. Interstate 195 is the nearest limited-access highway.

=== Airport ===
Monmouth Executive Airport is a public-use airport located east of Farmingdale.

== Notable people ==
People who were born in, residents of, or otherwise closely associated with Farmingdale include:

- Charles H. Boud (1843–1921), politician who served in the New Jersey General Assembly
- Billy Brown (born 1944), singer, songwriter, and record producer who was an original member of the R&B vocal group Ray, Goodman & Brown
- Oliver Huff Brown (1852–1924), businessman and politician who served in the New Jersey General Assembly from 1897 to 1898 and the New Jersey Senate from 1903 to 1912
- George Fischbeck (1922–2015), television weatherman
- Jim Gary (1939–2006), sculptor popularly known for his large, colorful creations of dinosaurs made from discarded automobile parts
- Herman Hill (1945–1970), professional baseball outfielder who played for the Minnesota Twins
- Janis Ian (born 1951), singer-songwriter and author known for her 1967 top twenty hit "Society's Child" and her 1975 top five "At Seventeen"
- Denny Walling (born 1954), Major League Baseball player in the 1980s who played predominantly for the Houston Astros
- Steve Whitt (born 1969), former professional stock car racing driver who competed in the NASCAR Whelen Modified Tour

== See also ==
- Tuberculosis Preventorium for Children
