= John Wiggers =

American basketball player

Personal information
- Born: August 6, 1917 Spring Lake, New Jersey, U.S.
- Died: March 4, 2007 (aged 89) Waco, Texas, U.S.
- Listed height: 6 ft 9 in (2.06 m)
- Listed weight: 200 lb (91 kg)

Career information
- College: Morehead State (1937–1940)
- Position: Center

Career history
- 1940–1941, 1944–1946: Akron Goodyear Wingfoots
- 1947–1948: Cuyahoga Falls

John Jardyne Wiggers (August 6, 1917 – March 14, 2007) was an American professional basketball player. He played for the Akron Goodyear Wingfoots in the National Basketball League and averaged 0.6 points per game.
