= Mischa Levitzki =

Russian composer

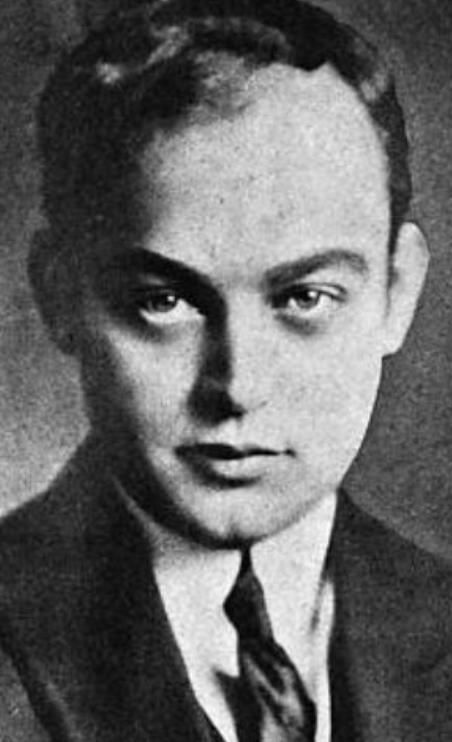
- Mischa Levitzki, from a 1925 publication
- Born: May 25, 1898; Kremenchuk, Russian Empire
- Died: January 2, 1941 (aged 42); Avon-by-the-Sea, New Jersey, United States
- Occupations: Pianist and Composer

Mischa Levitzki (also spelled Levitski; Ukrainian: Міша Левицький (Miša Levycʹkyj); May 25, 1898 – January 2, 1941) was a Russian-born U.S.-based concert pianist and composer.

Levitzki was born in Kremenchuk, Ukraine (then part of the Russian Empire), to Jewish parents who were naturalised American citizens on a return trip to Ukraine. He was playing the violin at the age of three, but soon developed an interest in the piano, which he studied in Warsaw with Aleksander Michałowski before making his debut in Antwerp in 1906.

In New York, his father brought him to the attention of Walter Damrosch, who obtained a scholarship for him at the Institute of Musical Art (now the Juilliard School) as a pupil of Zygmunt Stojowski, with whom he studied from 1907 to 1911. In 1913 Levitzki entered the Berlin Hochschule für Musik, where he became the youngest student of Ernst von Dohnányi and was awarded the Mendelssohn Prize in 1915. By this time he had performed throughout Europe and Scandinavia. He made his American debut in New York on October 17, 1916, at Aeolian Hall, and soon made his permanent home in the United States, later becoming an American citizen. Levitzki concertized worldwide up until the time of his death. He toured in the United States, Australia, New Zealand and Asia, making a reputation with his performances of the Romantic repertory. He was elected an honorary member of the Alpha chapter of Phi Mu Alpha Sinfonia fraternity at the New England Conservatory in 1917.

He transcribed numerous pieces for piano, prepared a cadenza for Beethoven's Third Piano Concerto, and wrote small pieces for the piano. Among his most popular compositions for piano were The Enchanted Nymph, Valse in A, Valse tzigane, and a gavotte.

He also recorded extensively for the AMPICO Piano Roll Company during the 1920s.

Levitzki died of a heart attack aged 42, in 1941, at his home in Avon-by-the-Sea, New Jersey. Levitski's papers are conserved at the New York Public Library for the Performing Arts.

== Compositions (selective list) ==
=== Piano solo ===
- Valse de concert, Op.1 (1924)
- Valse, Op. 2 (1921)
- Gavotte, Op. 3 (1923)
- Ah, Thou Beloved One, Op. 4 (1929)
- Arabesque valsante, Op. 6 (1934)
- Valse Tzigane, Op.7 (1935)
- Dance of the Doll, Op. 8 (1937)
- Do You Remember?, Op. 9 (1940)
- The Enchanted Nymph (1927)

== Sources ==
- David Ewen, Encyclopedia of Concert Music. New York; Hill and Wang, 1959.
