= Avon School District (New Jersey) =

School district in Monmouth County, New Jersey, US

Address
- 505 Lincoln Avenue Avon-by-the-Sea, Monmouth County, New Jersey, 07717; United States
- Coordinates: 40.19055°N 74.020629°W

District information
- Grades: PreK-8
- Superintendent: Michael-John Herits
- Business administrator: Amy Lerner
- Schools: 1

Students and staff
- Enrollment: 119 (as of 2023–24)
- Faculty: 18.5 FTEs
- Student–teacher ratio: 6.4:1

Other information
- District Factor Group: I
- Website: www.avonschool.com
Ind.	Per pupil	District spending	Rank (*)	K-8 average	%± vs. average
1A	Total Spending	$19,957	44	$18,891	5.6%
1	Budgetary Cost	16,716	49	14,159	18.1%
2	Classroom Instruction	9,070	34	8,659	4.7%
6	Support Services	3,941	62	2,167	81.9%
8	Administrative Cost	1,345	8	1,547	−13.1%
10	Operations & Maintenance	1,892	45	1,612	17.4%
13	Extracurricular Activities	316	59	104	203.8%
16	Median Teacher Salary	51,340	10	61,136
Data from NJDoE 2014 Taxpayers' Guide to Education Spending. *Of K-8 districts with up to 400 students. Lowest spending=1; Highest=71

The Avon School District is a community public school district that serves students in pre-kindergarten through eighth grade from Avon-by-the-Sea, in Monmouth County, in the U.S. state of New Jersey.

As of the 2023–24 school year, the district, comprised of one school, had an enrollment of 119 students and 18.5 classroom teachers (on an FTE basis), for a student–teacher ratio of 6.4:1. During the 2016–17 school year, Avon was tied with the 23rd smallest enrollment of any school district in the state, with 158 students.

The district had been classified by the New Jersey Department of Education as being in District Factor Group "I", the second-highest of eight groupings. District Factor Groups organize districts statewide to allow comparison by common socioeconomic characteristics of the local districts. From lowest socioeconomic status to highest, the categories are A, B, CD, DE, FG, GH, I and J.

For ninth through twelfth grades, public school students attend either Asbury Park High School or Manasquan High School, as part of sending/receiving relationships with the respective districts, based on the results of a lottery under which 62.5% of students are sent to Manasquan and 37.5% to Asbury Park. As of the 2023–24 school year, Asbury Park High School had an enrollment of 370 students and 36.0 classroom teachers (on an FTE basis), for a student–teacher ratio of 10.3:1.

The Manasquan school also serves students from Belmar, Brielle, Lake Como, Sea Girt, Spring Lake, Spring Lake Heights who attend as part of sending/receiving relationships with their respective districts. As of the 2023–24 school year, Manasquan High School had an enrollment of 945 students and 81.2 classroom teachers (on an FTE basis), for a student–teacher ratio of 11.6:1.

Students may also apply to academy schools in the Monmouth County Vocational School District, which include the Academy of Allied Health & Science, Biotechnology High School, High Technology High School, Marine Academy of Science and Technology and Communications High School. Students also have the option to attend Academy Charter High School in Lake Como, which accepts students on a lottery basis from the communities of Allenhurst, Asbury Park, Avon-by-the-Sea, Belmar, Bradley Beach, Deal, Interlaken and Lake Como.

== School ==
Avon Elementary School serves students in grades PreK–8 and had an enrollment of 116 students during the 2023–24 school year.

== Administration ==
Core members of the district's administration are:

- Michael-John Herits, superintendent and principal
- Amy Lerner, business administrator and board secretary

== Board of education ==
The district's board of education, comprised of seven members, sets policy and oversees the fiscal and educational operation of the district through its administration. As a Type II school district, the board's trustees are elected directly by voters to serve three-year terms of office on a staggered basis, with either two or three seats up for election each year held (since 2012) as part of the November general election. The board appoints a superintendent to oversee the district's day-to-day operations and a business administrator to supervise the business functions of the district.
