= Pat Delany (basketball) =

American basketball coach

Toronto Raptors
- Position: Assistant coach
- League: NBA

Personal information
- Born: Avon-by-the-Sea, New Jersey, U.S.

Career information
- College: Saint Anselm College
- Coaching career: 2013–present

Career history

Coaching
- 2013–2014: Sioux Falls Skyforce
- 2014–2018: Charlotte Hornets (assistant)
- 2018–2021: Orlando Magic (assistant)
- 2021–2023: Washington Wizards (assistant)
- 2023–present: Toronto Raptors (assistant)

Pat Delany is an American professional basketball coach who is the lead assistant coach for the Toronto Raptors of the National Basketball Association (NBA). Delany had served as the head coach of the Toronto Raptors at the 2023 NBA Summer League. Delany has worked in various coaching positions in the NBA. He has also worked for the Orlando Magic, Charlotte Hornets, Miami Heat and Washington Wizards.

== Playing career ==
Raised in Avon-by-the-Sea, New Jersey, Delany played prep basketball at Christian Brothers Academy.

Standing at 6-2 and weighing 185 pounds, Delany played for the Saint Anselm Hawks men's basketball team in NCAA Division II. Over his college career, Delany played 118 games, starting in 58 of them. He averaged 3.7 points per game and had a shooting percentage of 41.5%. Delany also recorded 731 assists.

== Coaching career ==
Delany began his coaching career in the NBA in 2001–2002 as a Video Intern with the Boston Celtics. He then moved on to the Miami Heat, where he worked as a Video Intern from 2002 to 2003 before being promoted to Video Coordinator from 2003 to 2007 and eventually advancing to the role of Advance Scout from 2007 to 2013.

In 2013–2014, Delany was promoted to the role of Head Coach for the Sioux Falls Skyforce.

In his inaugural season with the Sioux Falls Skyforce, Pat Delany led the team to a 31–19 record, earning them home court advantage in the first round of the postseason and bringing them to the semi-finals.

He then joined the Charlotte Hornets as an Assistant Coach, serving from 2014 to April 2018.

Delany's coaching career continued with the Orlando Magic, where he continued the role of Assistant Coach from June 2018 to 2021. Following his tenure with the Magic, he joined the Washington Wizards as the lead Assistant Coach in August 2021.

In 2023, he was hired as an assistant coach as a part of new head coach Darko Rajaković coaching staff with the Toronto Raptors. In October 2023, Rajaković announced that Delany will serve as the lead assistant coach, and he will also be in charge of the defence.

It was announced on July 4, 2023, that Delany would serve as the Raptors head coach at the NBA Summer League 2023 in Las Vegas.
