= Farmingdale School District =

School district in Monmouth County, New Jersey, US

Address
- 49 Academy Street Farmingdale, Monmouth County, New Jersey, 07727; United States
- Coordinates: 40.198505°N 74.171479°W

District information
- Grades: PreK-8
- Superintendent: Edith Conroy
- Business administrator: Ronald Sanasac
- Schools: 1

Students and staff
- Enrollment: 163 (as of 2022–23)
- Faculty: 24.0 FTEs
- Student–teacher ratio: 6.8:1

Other information
- District Factor Group: DE
- Website: farmingdaleschool.com
Ind.	Per pupil	District spending	Rank (*)	K-8 average	%± vs. average
1A	Total Spending	$17,995	34	$18,891	−4.7%
1	Budgetary Cost	15,453	40	14,159	9.1%
2	Classroom Instruction	9,353	39	8,659	8.0%
6	Support Services	2,602	41	2,167	20.1%
8	Administrative Cost	1,707	42	1,547	10.3%
10	Operations & Maintenance	1,712	33	1,612	6.2%
13	Extracurricular Activities	32	10	104	−69.2%
16	Median Teacher Salary	49,801	8	61,136
Data from NJDoE 2014 Taxpayers' Guide to Education Spending. *Of K-8 districts with up to 400 students. Lowest spending=1; Highest=71

The Farmingdale School District is a community public school district that serves students in pre-kindergarten through eighth grade from Farmingdale in Monmouth County, in the U.S. state of New Jersey.

As of the 2022–23 school year, the district, comprised of one school, had an enrollment of 163 students and 24.0 classroom teachers (on an FTE basis), for a student–teacher ratio of 6.8:1. In the 2016–17 school year, Farmingdale had the 34th-smallest enrollment of any school district in the state, with 161 students.

The district is classified by the New Jersey Department of Education as being in District Factor Group "DE", the fifth-highest of eight groupings. District Factor Groups organize districts statewide to allow comparison by common socioeconomic characteristics of the local districts. From lowest socioeconomic status to highest, the categories are A, B, CD, DE, FG, GH, I and J.

Public school students in ninth through twelfth grades attend Howell High School, together with students from portions of Howell. The school is part of the Freehold Regional High School District, which also serves students from Colts Neck Township, Englishtown, Freehold Borough, Freehold Township, Manalapan Township and Marlboro. As of the 2022–23 school year, the high school had an enrollment of 2,011 students and 133.2 classroom teachers (on an FTE basis), for a student–teacher ratio of 15.1:1.

== School ==
Farmingdale Elementary School served 163 students in pre-kindergarten through eighth grade as of the 2022–23 school year.

== Administration ==
Core members of the district's administration are:

- Edith Conroy, superintendent
- Ronald Sanasac, business administrator and board secretary

== Board of education ==
The district's board of education is comprised of five members who set policy and oversee the fiscal and educational operation of the district through its administration. As a Type II school district, the board's trustees are elected directly by voters to serve three-year terms of office on a staggered basis, with either one or two seats up for election each year held (since 2012) as part of the November general election. The board appoints a superintendent to oversee the district's day-to-day operations and a business administrator to supervise the business functions of the district.
