= Martin Maloney Cottage =

Historic house in New Jersey, United States

- U.S. National Register of Historic Places
- New Jersey Register of Historic Places
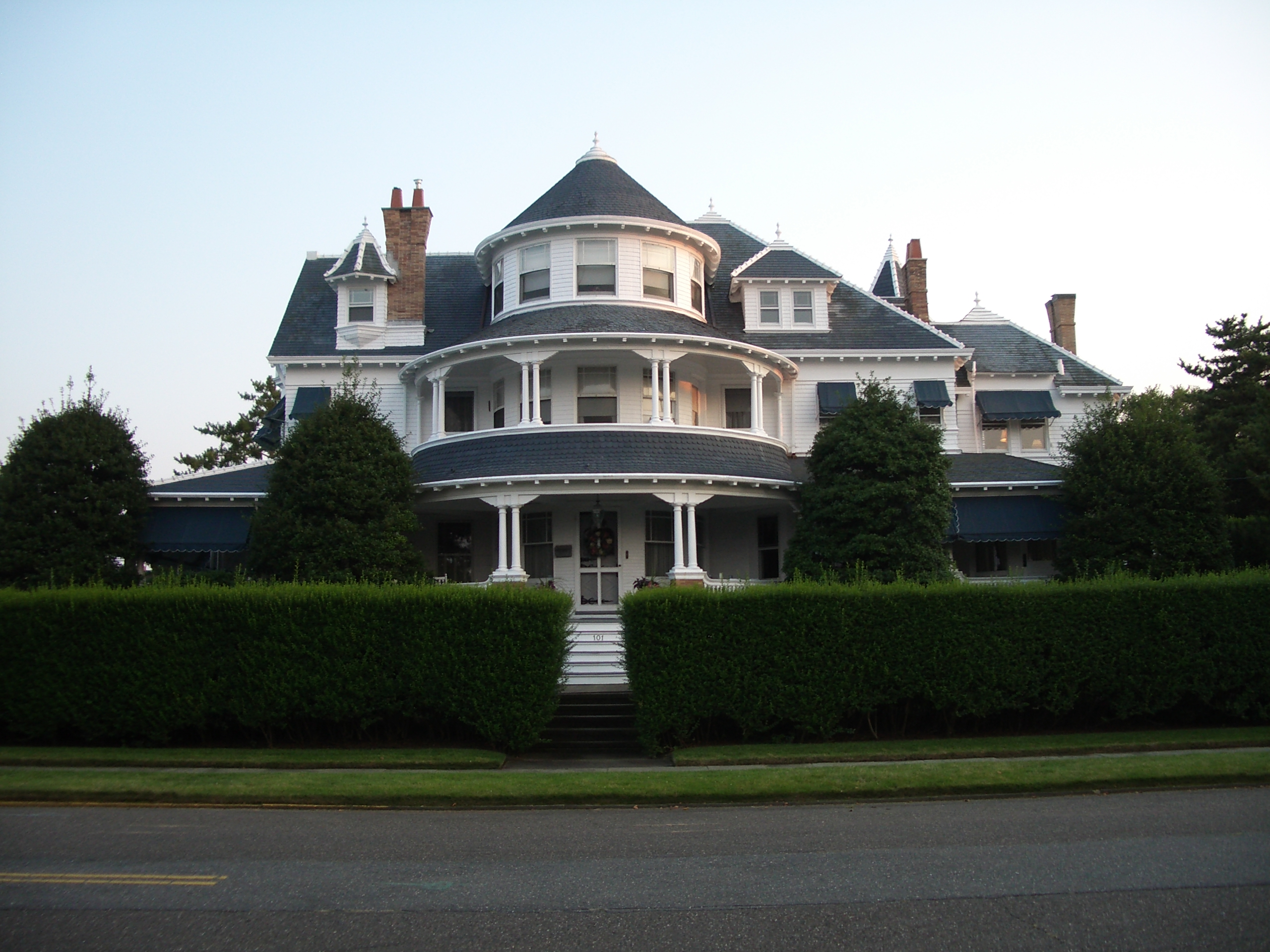

- Location within Monmouth County, New Jersey Location within New Jersey Location within the United States
- Location: 101 Morris Avenue, Spring Lake, New Jersey
- Coordinates: 40°9′5″N 74°1′29″W
- Architectural style: Queen Anne
- MPS: Spring Lake as a Coastal Resort MPS
- NRHP reference No.: 91000115
- NJRHP No.: 2059

Significant dates
- Added to NRHP: October 26, 1992
- Designated NJRHP: January 14, 1991

The Martin Maloney Cottage is located at 101 Morris Avenue in the borough of Spring Lake in Monmouth County, New Jersey, United States. The historic Queen Anne summer house was built in the 1890s. Martin Maloney, a wealthy businessman from Philadelphia, purchased the property from John and Matilda Trower in 1898. It was added to the National Register of Historic Places on October 26, 1992, for its significance in architecture. It was listed as part of the Spring Lake as a Coastal Resort Multiple Property Submission (MPS).

== See also ==
- National Register of Historic Places listings in Monmouth County, New Jersey
