= Audenried Cottage =

Historic house in New Jersey, United States

- U.S. National Register of Historic Places
- New Jersey Register of Historic Places
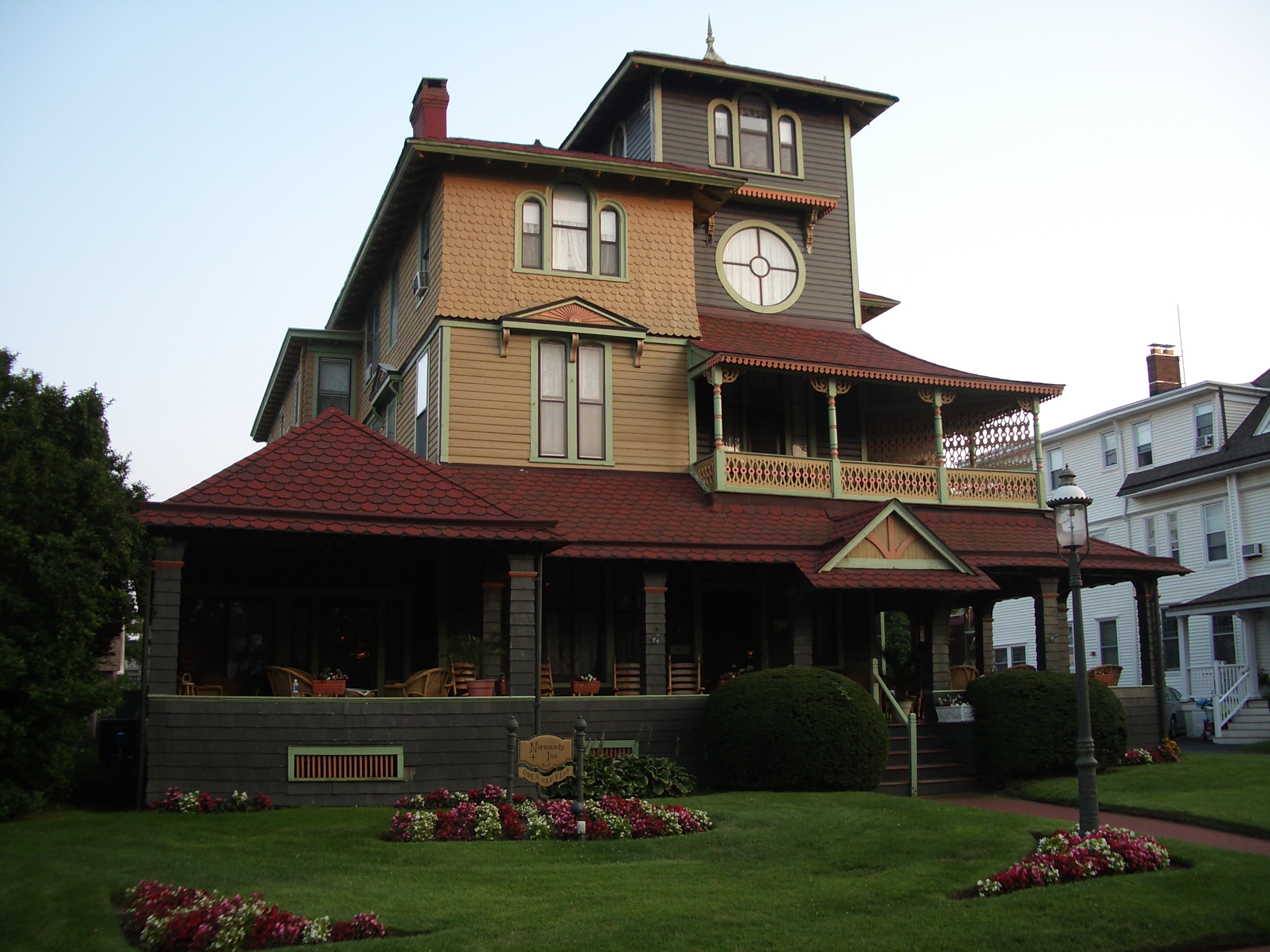

- Location within Monmouth County, New Jersey Location within New Jersey Location within the United States
- Location: 21 Tuttle Avenue, Spring Lake, New Jersey
- Coordinates: 40°9′31″N 74°1′21″W
- Area: less than one acre
- Built: 1909
- Architect: Freehold & New York; Conover, Warren
- Architectural style: Italianate, Queen Anne, Shingle Style
- MPS: Spring Lake, NJ as a Coastal Resort MPS
- NRHP reference No.: 91000117
- NJRHP No.: 2057

Significant dates
- Added to NRHP: March 8, 1991
- Designated NJRHP: January 14, 1991

Audenried Cottage is located in Spring Lake, Monmouth County, New Jersey, United States. The building was built in 1909 and added to the National Register of Historic Places on March 8, 1991.

== See also ==
- National Register of Historic Places listings in Monmouth County, New Jersey
