= Anne Evans Estabrook =

American real estate developer

- Education: Cornell University
- Occupation: Real estate developer
- Known for: Republican candidate for the 2008 United States Senate election in New Jersey
- Political party: Republican
- Spouse: Kenneth Estabrook

Anne Evans Estabrook is an American real estate developer who was the frontrunner in the Republican primary for the 2008 United States Senate race in New Jersey before suffering a mini-stroke and withdrawing from the race.

Estabrook attended Cornell University and graduated in 1965 with a B.S. degree in Industrial and Labor Relations. She received an M.B.A. in 1966, also from Cornell. She has served on the Cornell Board of Trustees and the Advisory Council for the Cornell University School of Industrial and Labor Relations (ILR School). The ILR School also awarded her the first Jerome Alpern Award for distinguished service and named a Distinguished Lectureship in Conflict Resolution in her honor.

She is the owner of the Elberon Development Corporation of Kenilworth, New Jersey, a family-owned company specializing in the development, leasing and management of industrial and commercial real estate. She also spent more than twenty years as a Director of the Elizabethtown Water Co. She was appointed by Governor Christie Whitman to serve on the governing board of the New Jersey Economic Development Authority. In 2004–2005, she was the first female Chair of the New Jersey Chamber of Commerce. In 2007, she was named by NJBIZ as one of New Jersey's Best 50 Women in Business.

Estabrook lives in Spring Lake, New Jersey. In 1994, she married Kenneth Estabrook, an attorney in private practice who had been counsel to the family company. He died of a stroke on November 13, 2003 at Monmouth Medical Center.

In October 2007, Estabrook filed her candidacy as a Republican candidate for the 2008 United States Senate race in New Jersey to oppose incumbent Frank Lautenberg. In January 2008, she announced that she had invested $1.6 million of her own money in her Senate campaign. In March 2008, she withdrew from the race, releasing a statement that she had suffered a transient ischemic attack or "mini-stroke."

Immigrant-justice activists began protesting Estabrook in 2020 after the deportation of Hector Garcia Mendoza from the Elizabeth Detention Center in Elizabeth, New Jersey, which Elberon leases to the private prison company CoreCivic. It is the only private immigrant detention center in New Jersey. After protests outside Elberon's home office, the firm announced in July 2020 that it would "end our relationship” with CoreCivic, though it offered no concrete steps toward that end. Estabrook is affiliated with such New Jersey institutions as Kean University (where she has served as Vice-Chairperson of Wenzhou-Kean University) and the New Jersey Performing Arts Center, where she sits on the board of directors. Activists have protested these institutions, demanding they break their ties with Estabrook until she ends the lease to CoreCivic.

In July 2020, Elberon announced its intention to end its lease to CoreCivic, stating the company "want[s] our values mirrored in our work." In May 2021, Elberon, owners of the windowless former warehouse turned ICE dentention center, alleged its tenant permitted dangerous conditions at the facility and sued to terminate its lease, representing a potential victory for activists.
