= Avon High School =

Avon High School is the name of:

- Avon High School (Connecticut), Avon, Connecticut
- Avon High School (Illinois), Avon, Illinois
- Avon High School (Indiana), Avon, Indiana
- Avon High School (Massachusetts), Avon, Massachusetts
- Avon High School (New York), Avon, New York
- Avon High School (Ohio), Avon, Ohio
- Avon High School (South Dakota), Avon, South Dakota
- Avon Lake High School, Avon Lake, Ohio
- Avon Park High School, Avon Park, Florida
- Avon Grove High School, West Grove, Pennsylvania
