= North Spring Lake, New Jersey =

- Former borough
- Location in Monmouth County. Inset: Location of county within the state of New Jersey
- Coordinates: 40.161493°N 74.022789°W
- Country: United States
- State: New Jersey
- County: Monmouth
- Incorporated: May 1884
- Dissolved: February 24, 1903

Government
  - Type: Borough
- Time zone: UTC-5 (Eastern (EST))
  - Summer (DST): UTC-4 (Eastern (EDT))

North Spring Lake was a borough that existed in Monmouth County, New Jersey, United States, from 1884 until 1903.

Historical population
Census	Pop.	Note	%±
1890	277		—
1900	361		30.3%
Population sources: 1890-1900

The Borough of North Spring Lake was incorporated in May 1884, from portions of Wall Township. The borough was reincorporated on January 3, 1893, and gained additional portions of Wall Township in 1899 and 1903.

On February 24, 1903, the borough was annexed to Spring Lake, and the municipality of North Spring Lake was dissolved.
