= Spring Lake, New Jersey =

Borough in Monmouth County, New Jersey, US

- Borough
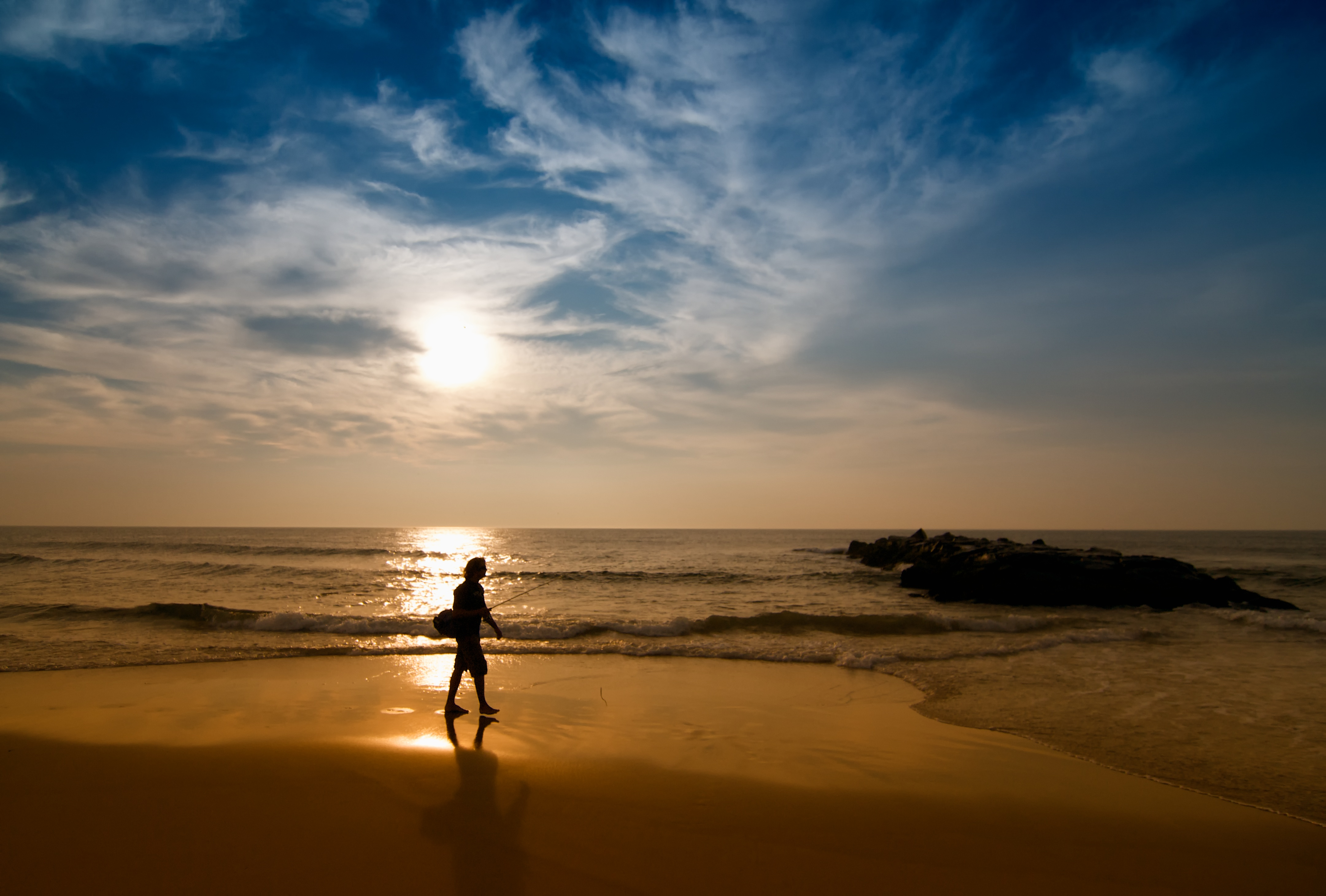
- Sunrise on the Jersey Shore at Spring Lake

- Seal

- Location of Spring Lake in Monmouth County. Inset: Location of Monmouth County highlighted in the State of New Jersey.

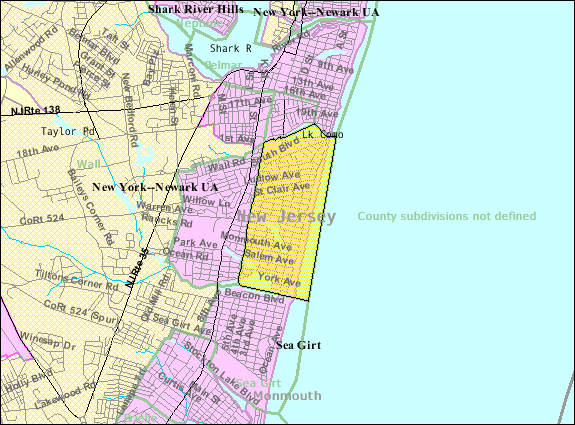
- Census Bureau map of Spring Lake, New Jersey
- Interactive map of Spring Lake, New Jersey
- Location in Monmouth County Location in New Jersey Location in the United States
- Coordinates: 40.153764°N 74.026853°W
- Country: United States
- State: New Jersey
- County: Monmouth
- Incorporated: March 14, 1892

Government
  - Type: Borough
  - Body: Borough Council
  - Mayor: Jennifer Naughton (D, term ends December 31, 2027)
  - Administrator: W. Bryan Dempsey
  - Municipal clerk: Dina M. Zahorsky

Area
  - Total: 1.75 sq mi (4.52 km^{2})
  - Land: 1.33 sq mi (3.45 km^{2})
  - Water: 0.41 sq mi (1.07 km^{2}) 23.60%
  - Rank: 426th of 565 in state 34th of 53 in county
- Elevation: 16 ft (4.9 m)

Population (2020)
  - Total: 2,789
  - Estimate (2023): 2,751
  - Rank: 455th of 565 in state 40th of 53 in county
  - Density: 2,093.1/sq mi (808.2/km^{2})
  - Rank: 287th of 565 in state 34th of 53 in county
- Time zone: UTC−05:00 (Eastern (EST))
  - Summer (DST): UTC−04:00 (Eastern (EDT))
- ZIP Code: 07762
- Area code: 732 exchanges: 282, 449, 974
- FIPS code: 3402570110
- GNIS feature ID: 0885406
- Website: www.springlakeboro.org

Spring Lake is a borough situated on the Jersey Shore in Monmouth County, in the U.S. state of New Jersey. As of the 2020 United States census, the borough's population was 2,789, a decrease of 204 (−6.8%) from the 2010 census count of 2,993, which in turn reflected a decline of 574 (−16.1%) from the 3,567 counted in the 2000 census.

New Jersey Monthly magazine ranked Spring Lake as the 240th best place to live in New Jersey in its 2010 rankings of the "Best Places To Live" in New Jersey.

In 2012, Forbes.com listed Spring Lake as 187th in its listing of "America's Most Expensive ZIP Codes", with a median home price of $1,190,586.

== History ==
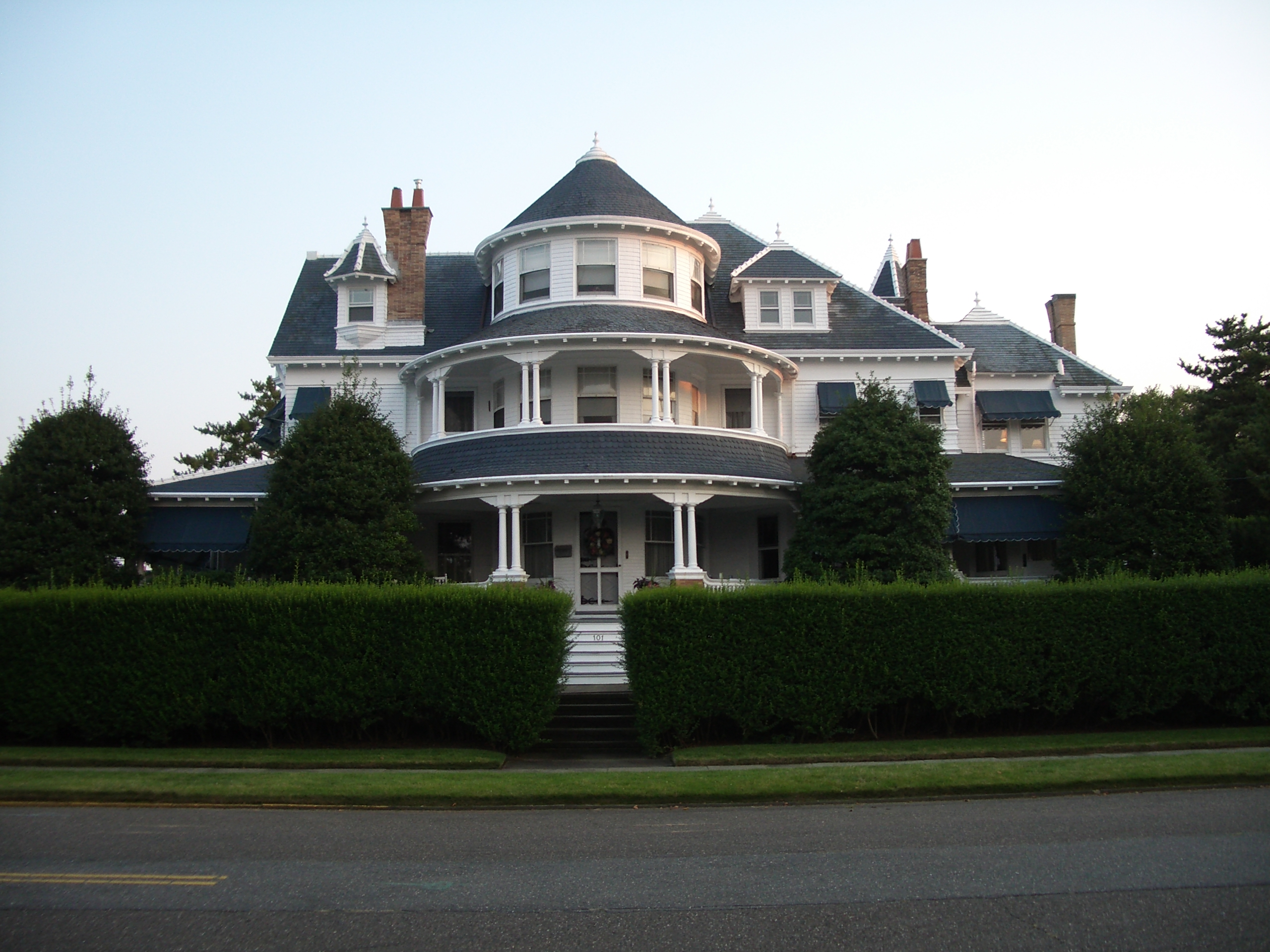
The Martin Maloney Cottage was placed on the National Register of Historic Places on October 26, 1992.

Spring Lake was formed as a borough by an act of the New Jersey Legislature on March 14, 1892, from portions of Wall Township, based on the results of a referendum held on March 8, 1892. On February 24, 1903, the borough of North Spring Lake was annexed to Spring Lake. The borough was named for a clear spring-fed lake.

During the "Gilded Age" of the late 19th and early 20th centuries, Spring Lake developed into a coastal resort for members of New York City and Philadelphia high society, in similar fashion to the settlements of Newport, Rhode Island, and Bar Harbor, Maine. A surviving example of architecture constructed during this era is the Martin Maloney Cottage on Morris Avenue next to the tycoon's former and no longer existent Ballingarry Estate. Another fine example of period architecture listed on the National Register of Historic Places is the Audenried Cottage on Tuttle Avenue.

The owner of the Ballingarry Estate, Marquis Martin Maloney, built St. Catharine Roman Catholic Church on a knoll overlooking the eponymous Spring Lake. The cornerstone of the church was laid on St. Patrick's Day in 1901.

The second of the five victims of the Jersey Shore shark attacks of 1916, Charles Bruder, 27, a Swiss bellhop for the Essex and Sussex Hotel, was killed on July 6, 1916, while swimming approximately 130 yards (120 m) from shore in Spring Lake. The wave of attacks took place between July 1 and July 12, 1916, along 80 miles (130 km) of Atlantic Ocean coastline and is often attributed as having inspired the novel Jaws by Peter Benchley and the corresponding film by Steven Spielberg, though Benchley has explicitly denied the claim.

The borough and its environs are known as the "Irish Riviera" because of the large Irish-American population in the area, with Spring Lake having the highest percentage of any municipality in the United States.

The Spring Lake 5 Mile Run, a race that was first run in 1977, circles the borough, beginning and ending at the beachfront. The 2014 race had 10,360 finishers, out of 12,500 registered; it is the country's largest 5-mile race. In 2015, the race was listed as one of the top 100 races in America by Runner's World magazine. Over the span of 20 years, participants and supporters of the race have raised roughly 4.5 million dollars.

== Geography ==
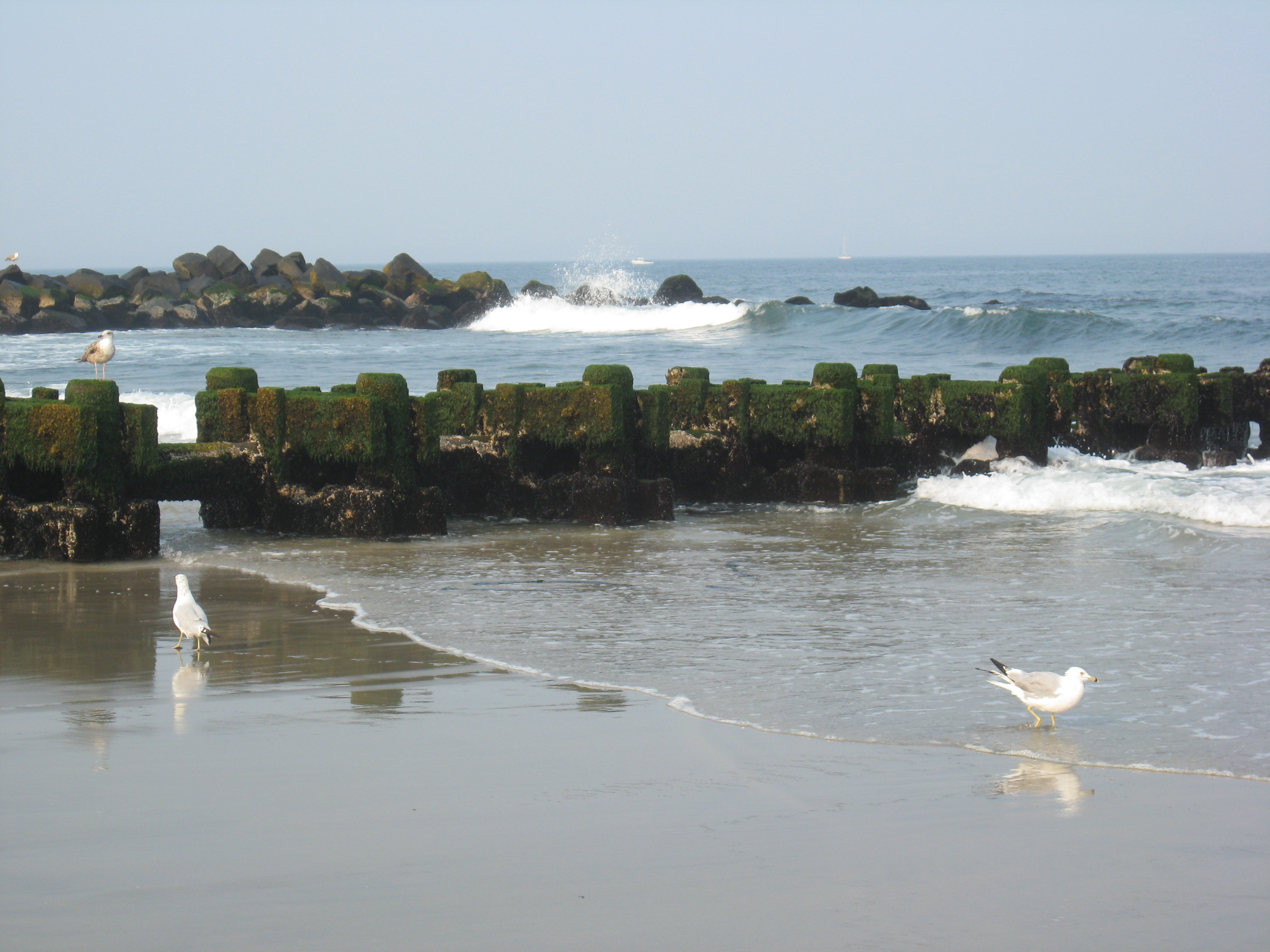
A group of seagulls move around on Spring Lake's beachfront in the vicinity of a pipe.

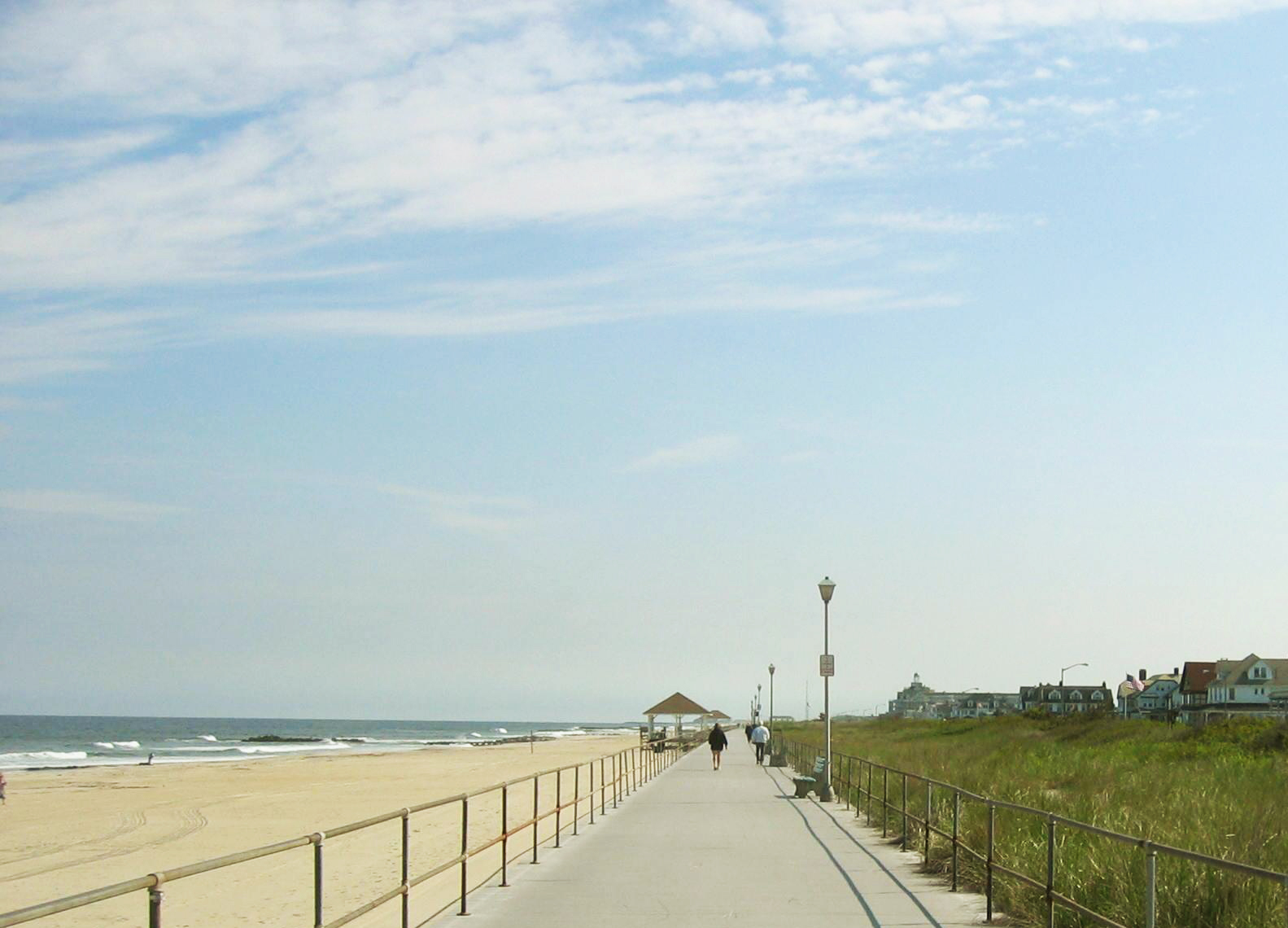
A view of the Spring Lake beach, boardwalk, dunes, and oceanfront homes

According to the United States Census Bureau, the borough had a total area of 1.75 square miles (4.52 km^{2}), including 1.33 square miles (3.45 km^{2}) of land and 0.41 square miles (1.07 km^{2}) of water (23.60%).

Wreck Pond is a tidal pond located on the coast of the Atlantic Ocean, surrounded by Wall Township and the boroughs of Spring Lake, Spring Lake Heights, and Sea Girt, covering an area of 28 acres (11 ha). The Wreck Pond watershed covers about 12 square miles (31 km^{2}) in eastern Monmouth County.

The borough borders the Monmouth County municipalities of Belmar, Lake Como, Sea Girt, Spring Lake Heights and Wall Township.

North Spring Lake was an independent borough established in 1884 which comprised the northern portion of Spring Lake. The borough was disestablished and its territory was annexed by Spring Lake in 1903.

== Demographics ==
Historical population
Census	Pop.	Note	%±
1900	526		—
1910	853		62.2%
1920	1,009		18.3%
1930	1,745		72.9%
1940	1,650		−5.4%
1950	2,008		21.7%
1960	2,922		45.5%
1970	3,896		33.3%
1980	4,215		8.2%
1990	3,499		−17.0%
2000	3,567		1.9%
2010	2,993		−16.1%
2020	2,789		−6.8%
2023 (est.)	2,751	▼	−1.4%
Population sources: 1900–1920; 1900–1910 1910–1930 1940–2000; 2000 2010 2020

=== 2020 census ===
As of the 2020 census, Spring Lake had a population of 2,789. The median age was 58.4 years. 14.0% of residents were under the age of 18 and 35.1% of residents were 65 years of age or older. For every 100 females there were 92.7 males, and for every 100 females age 18 and over there were 88.2 males age 18 and over.

100.0% of residents lived in urban areas, while 0.0% lived in rural areas.

There were 1,225 households in Spring Lake, of which 18.8% had children under the age of 18 living in them. Of all households, 56.3% were married-couple households, 15.0% were households with a male householder and no spouse or partner present, and 26.8% were households with a female householder and no spouse or partner present. About 31.3% of all households were made up of individuals and 21.5% had someone living alone who was 65 years of age or older.

There were 2,107 housing units, of which 41.9% were vacant. The homeowner vacancy rate was 1.4% and the rental vacancy rate was 7.3%.

Racial composition as of the 2020 census
Race	Number	Percent
White	2,618	93.9%
Black or African American	11	0.4%
American Indian and Alaska Native	3	0.1%
Asian	36	1.3%
Native Hawaiian and Other Pacific Islander	0	0.0%
Some other race	15	0.5%
Two or more races	106	3.8%
Hispanic or Latino (of any race)	86	3.1%

=== 2010 census ===
The 2010 United States census counted 2,993 people, 1,253 households, and 829 families in the borough. The population density was 2,250.8 per square mile (869.0/km^{2}). There were 2,048 housing units at an average density of 1,540.2 per square mile (594.7/km^{2}). The racial makeup was 97.63% (2,922) White, 0.27% (8) Black or African American, 0.03% (1) Native American, 1.00% (30) Asian, 0.03% (1) Pacific Islander, 0.50% (15) from other races, and 0.53% (16) from two or more races. Hispanic or Latino of any race were 1.90% (57) of the population.

Of the 1,253 households, 22.6% had children under the age of 18; 56.8% were married couples living together; 7.7% had a female householder with no husband present and 33.8% were non-families. Of all households, 31.3% were made up of individuals and 19.1% had someone living alone who was 65 years of age or older. The average household size was 2.38 and the average family size was 3.01.

21.6% of the population were under the age of 18, 5.6% from 18 to 24, 12.2% from 25 to 44, 33.2% from 45 to 64, and 27.4% who were 65 years of age or older. The median age was 51.9 years. For every 100 females, the population had 89.3 males. For every 100 females ages 18 and older there were 83.9 males.

The Census Bureau's 2006–2010 American Community Survey showed that (in 2010 inflation-adjusted dollars) median household income was $97,885 (with a margin of error of +/− $16,792) and the median family income was $150,156 (+/− $39,466). Males had a median income of $106,853 (+/− $30,491) versus $68,750 (+/− $15,695) for females. The per capita income for the borough was $71,661 (+/− $14,582). About 2.2% of families and 2.8% of the population were below the poverty line, including none of those under age 18 and 2.0% of those age 65 or over.

=== 2000 census ===
As of the 2000 United States census there were 3,567 people, 1,463 households, and 983 families residing in the borough. The population density was 2,723.8 inhabitants per square mile (1,051.7/km^{2}). There were 1,930 housing units at an average density of 1,473.7 per square mile (569.0/km^{2}). The racial makeup of the borough was 98.77% White, 0.34% African American, 0.28% Asian, 0.11% from other races, and 0.50% from two or more races. Hispanic or Latino of any race were 0.73% of the population.

There were 1,463 households, out of which 23.0% had children under the age of 18 living with them, 57.8% were married couples living together, 7.2% had a female householder with no husband present, and 32.8% were non-families. 29.5% of all households were made up of individuals, and 16.4% had someone living alone who was 65 years of age or older. The average household size was 2.43 and the average family size was 3.03.

In the borough the population was spread out, with 21.8% under the age of 18, 4.5% from 18 to 24, 19.6% from 25 to 44, 28.9% from 45 to 64, and 25.1% who were 65 years of age or older. The median age was 48 years. For every 100 females, there were 86.1 males. For every 100 females age 18 and over, there were 83.2 males.

As of 2008, the median income for a household in the borough was $115,709. Males had a median income of $88,924 versus $41,000 for females. The per capita income for the borough was $59,445. None of the families and 2.6% of the population were living below the poverty line, including no under eighteens and 6.6% of those over 64.

39.4% of Spring Lake residents identified as being of Irish American ancestry in the 2000 Census, the highest percentage of Irish Americans of any place in the United States.

== Government ==
=== Local government ===
Spring Lake is governed under the borough form of New Jersey municipal government, which is used in 218 municipalities (of the 564) statewide, making it the most common form of government in New Jersey. The governing body is comprised of the mayor and the borough council, with all positions elected at-large on a partisan basis as part of the November general election. The mayor is elected directly by the voters to a four-year term of office. The borough council includes six members elected to serve three-year terms on a staggered basis, with two seats coming up for election each year in a three-year cycle. The borough form of government used by Spring Lake is a "weak mayor / strong council" government in which council members act as the legislative body with the mayor presiding at meetings and voting only in the event of a tie. The mayor can veto ordinances subject to an override by a two-thirds majority vote of the council. The mayor makes committee and liaison assignments for council members, and most appointments are made by the mayor with the advice and consent of the council.

As of 2025, the mayor of Spring Lake is Democrat Jennifer Naughton, whose term of office ends on December 31, 2027. Members of the Spring Lake Borough Council are Joseph T. Erbe Jr. (R, 2025), Edwin J. Hale (R, 2025), Brendan Judge (R, 2026), Kathleen McDonough (R, 2027), Matthew Q. Sagui (R, 2026) and Syd Whalley (D, 2027).

=== Federal, state and county representation ===
Spring Lake is located in the 4th Congressional District and is part of New Jersey's 10th legislative district.

For the 119th United States Congress, New Jersey's 4th congressional district is represented by Chris Smith (R, Manchester Township). New Jersey is represented in the United States Senate by Democrats Cory Booker (Newark, term ends 2027) and Andy Kim (Moorestown, term ends 2031).

For the 2026–2027 session, the 10th legislative district of the New Jersey Legislature is represented in the State Senate by James W. Holzapfel (R, Toms River) and in the General Assembly by Paul Kanitra (R, Point Pleasant Beach) and Gregory P. McGuckin (R, Toms River).

Monmouth County is governed by a Board of County Commissioners composed of five members who are elected at-large to serve three-year terms of office on a staggered basis, with either one or two seats up for election each year as part of the November general election. At an annual reorganization meeting held in the beginning of January, the board selects one of its members to serve as director and another as deputy director.

As of 2025, Monmouth County's Commissioners are Director Thomas A. Arnone (R, Neptune City, 2025), Susan M. Kiley (R, Hazlet Township, 2027), Erik Anderson (R, Shrewsbury, 2026), Nick DiRocco (R, Wall Township, 2025), and Deputy Director Ross F. Licitra (R, Marlboro Township, 2026).

Constitutional officers elected on a countywide basis are Clerk Christine Giordano Hanlon (R, 2025; Ocean Township), Sheriff Shaun Golden (R, 2025; Howell Township) and Surrogate Rosemarie D. Peters (R, 2026; Middletown Township).

=== Politics ===
United States presidential election results for Spring Lake
Year	Republican		Democratic		Third party(ies)	
Year	No.	%	No.	%	No.	%
2024	1,157	56.17%	871	42.28%	32	1.55%
2020	1,223	55.59%	948	43.09%	29	1.32%
2016	1,138	61.95%	646	35.17%	53	2.89%
2012	1,258	70.36%	514	28.75%	16	0.89%
2008	1,326	65.58%	676	33.43%	20	0.99%
2004	1,427	67.09%	670	31.50%	30	1.41%
2000	1,419	64.97%	663	30.36%	102	4.67%
1996	1,231	62.14%	606	30.59%	144	7.27%
1992	1,239	59.80%	519	25.05%	314	15.15%

As of March 2011, there were a total of 2,520 registered voters in Spring Lake, of which 453 (18.0%) were registered as Democrats, 1,104 (43.8%) were registered as Republicans and 961 (38.1%) were registered as Unaffiliated. There were two voters registered as Libertarians or Greens.

In the 2012 presidential election, Republican Mitt Romney received 70.4% of the vote (1,258 cast), ahead of Democrat Barack Obama with 28.7% (514 votes), and other candidates with 0.9% (16 votes), among the 1,804 ballots cast by the borough's 2,544 registered voters (16 ballots were spoiled), for a turnout of 70.9%. In the 2008 presidential election, Republican John McCain received 64.4% of the vote (1,326 cast), ahead of Democrat Barack Obama with 32.8% (676 votes) and other candidates with 1.0% (20 votes), among the 2,059 ballots cast by the borough's 2,692 registered voters, for a turnout of 76.5%. In the 2004 presidential election, Republican George W. Bush received 64.0% of the vote (1,427 ballots cast), outpolling Democrat John Kerry with 30.1% (670 votes) and other candidates with 1.0% (30 votes), among the 2,229 ballots cast by the borough's 2,873 registered voters, for a turnout percentage of 77.6.

Gubernatorial election results for Spring Lake
Year	Republican		Democratic		Third party(ies)	
Year	No.	%	No.	%	No.	%
2025	1,086	61.25%	686	38.69%	1	0.06%
2021	1,051	65.61%	547	34.14%	4	0.25%
2017	884	71.41%	339	27.38%	15	1.21%
2013	1,226	82.73%	230	15.52%	26	1.75%
2009	1,144	69.84%	388	23.69%	106	6.47%
2005	1,104	68.66%	460	28.61%	44	2.74%

In the 2013 gubernatorial election, Republican Chris Christie received 82.7% of the vote (1,226 cast), ahead of Democrat Barbara Buono with 15.5% (230 votes), and other candidates with 1.8% (26 votes), among the 1,505 ballots cast by the borough's 2,542 registered voters (23 ballots were spoiled), for a turnout of 59.2%. In the 2009 gubernatorial election, Republican Chris Christie received 68.8% of the vote (1,144 ballots cast), ahead of Democrat Jon Corzine with 23.3% (388 votes), Independent Chris Daggett with 5.7% (95 votes) and other candidates with 0.7% (11 votes), among the 1,663 ballots cast by the borough's 2,593 registered voters, yielding a 64.1% turnout.

United States Senate election results for Spring Lake1
Year	Republican		Democratic		Third party(ies)	
Year	No.	%	No.	%	No.	%
2024	1,231	59.96%	806	39.26%	16	0.78%
2018	1,092	67.74%	481	29.84%	39	2.42%
2012	1,196	69.90%	498	29.11%	17	0.99%
2006	992	73.86%	334	24.87%	17	1.27%

United States Senate election results for Spring Lake2
Year	Republican		Democratic		Third party(ies)	
Year	No.	%	No.	%	No.	%
2020	1,356	61.03%	846	38.07%	20	0.90%
2014	912	68.73%	390	29.39%	25	1.88%
2013	665	69.06%	288	29.91%	10	1.04%
2008	1,332	70.14%	545	28.70%	22	1.16%

== Education ==
The Spring Lake School District is a public school district that serves students in pre-kindergarten through eighth grade at H. W. Mountz School. As of the 2023–24 school year, the district, comprised of one school, had an enrollment of 142 students and 22.5 classroom teachers (on an FTE basis), for a student–teacher ratio of 6.3:1. In the 2016–17 school year, Spring Lake had the 43rd smallest enrollment of any school district in the state, with 197 students. In 2015, H.W. Mountz School was one of 15 schools in New Jersey, and one of nine public schools, recognized as a National Blue Ribbon School in the exemplary high performing category by the United States Department of Education. H.W. Mountz high performing academics that was recognized is reflected through the student's state testing. For instance, 92% of students tested as proficient on state reading tests and 77% of students test as proficient for the math section.

Students attending public high school for ninth through twelfth grades are assigned to Manasquan High School as part of a sending/receiving relationship with the Manasquan Public Schools. Manasquan High School also serves students from Avon-by-the-Sea, Belmar, Brielle, Lake Como, Sea Girt and Spring Lake Heights who attend Manasquan High School as part of sending/receiving relationships with their respective districts. As of the 2023–24 school year, the high school had an enrollment of 945 students and 81.2 classroom teachers (on an FTE basis), for a student–teacher ratio of 11.6:1.

Students may also attend one of the magnet schools in the Monmouth County Vocational School District—Marine Academy of Science and Technology, Academy of Allied Health & Science, High Technology High School, Biotechnology High School, and Communications High School.

Spring Lake students are also served by Saint Catharine School, a Catholic school that serves students in grades K–8 and operates under the supervision of the Roman Catholic Diocese of Trenton. In 2018, the school was one of 18 schools in New Jersey recognized by the National Blue Ribbon Schools Program.

== Transportation ==
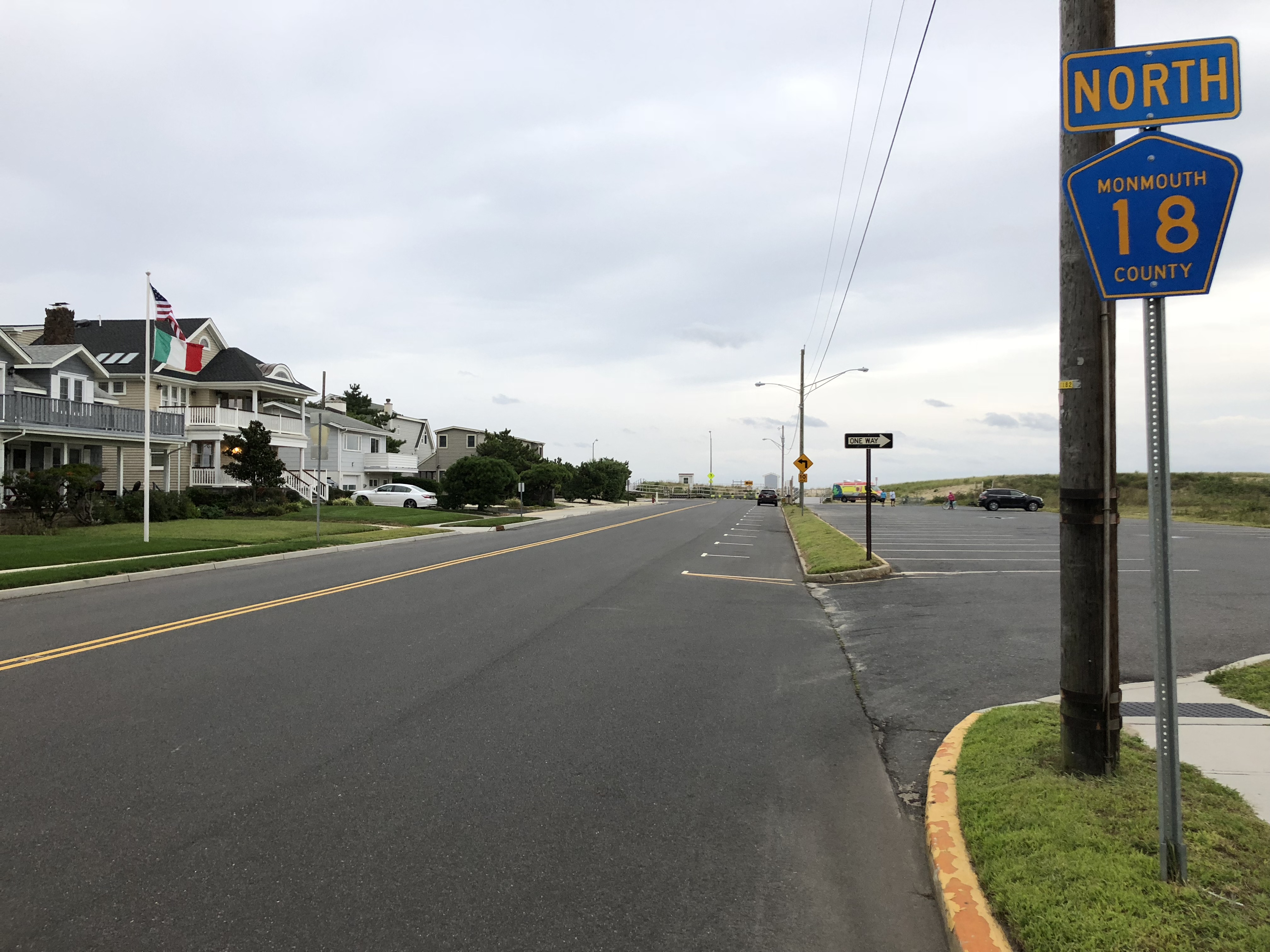
County Route 18 in Spring Lake

=== Roads and highways ===
As of May 2010, the borough had a total of 28.19 miles (45.37 km) of roadways, of which 26.06 miles (41.94 km) were maintained by the municipality and 2.13 miles (3.43 km) by Monmouth County.

No major roads pass through the borough, with the most significant routes being minor county roads such as County Route 18. Route 71 is accessible in bordering Spring Lake Heights. The Garden State Parkway and Interstate 195 are accessible in neighboring Wall Township.

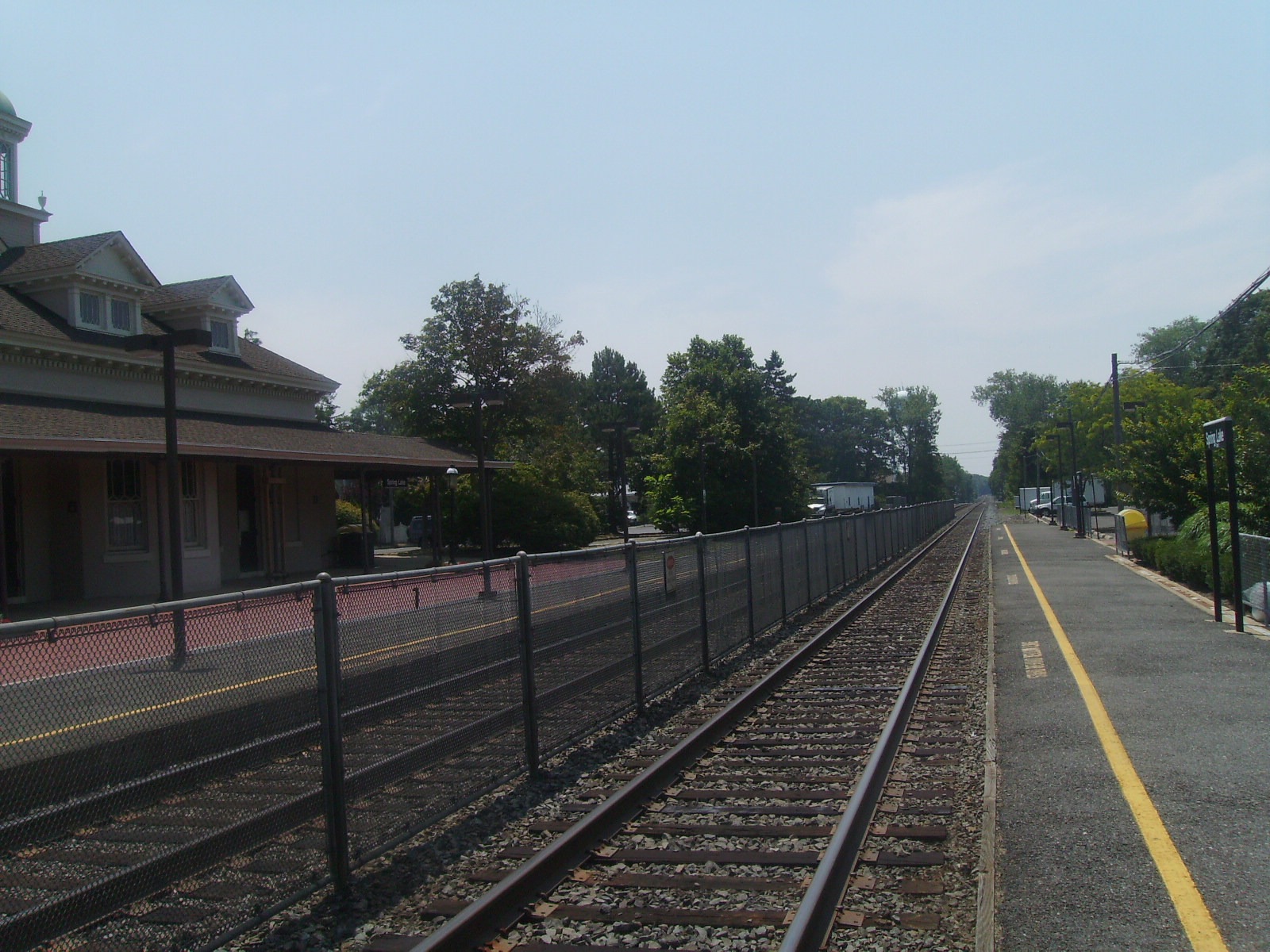
The Spring Lake station is served by the North Jersey Coast Line of NJ Transit Rail.

=== Public transportation ===
NJ Transit offers passenger train service at the Spring Lake station. Commuter service is provided on the North Jersey Coast Line, offering express and local service. Diesel service operates from Hoboken Terminal to Bay Head station. Electric service operates from New York Penn Station to Long Branch station, where the electrified portion of the line ends. Mid-line stations include Newark Penn Station, Newark Liberty International Airport Station, and Secaucus Junction.

NJ Transit bus service is available between the borough and Philadelphia on the 317 route, with local service offered on the 830 route.

== Climate ==
According to the Köppen climate classification system, Spring Lake has a humid subtropical climate (Cfa). Cfa climates are characterized by all months having an average mean temperature above 32.0 °F (0.0 °C), at least four months with an average mean temperature at or above 50.0 °F (10.0 °C), at least one month with an average mean temperature at or above 71.6 °F (22.0 °C) and no significant precipitation difference between seasons. During the summer months at Spring Lake, a cooling afternoon sea breeze is present on most days, but episodes of extreme heat and humidity can occur with heat index values at or above 95.0 °F (35.0 °C). On average, the wettest month of the year is July which corresponds with the annual peak in thunderstorm activity. During the winter months, episodes of extreme cold and wind can occur with wind chill values below 0.0 °F (−17.8 °C). The plant hardiness zone at Spring Lake Beach is 7a with an average annual extreme minimum air temperature of 3.8 °F (−15.7 °C). The average seasonal (November–April) snowfall total is 18 to 24 inches (46 to 61 cm) and the average snowiest month is February which corresponds with the annual peak in nor'easter activity.

Climate data for Spring Lake Beach, NJ (1991–2020 Averages)
Month	Jan	Feb	Mar	Apr	May	Jun	Jul	Aug	Sep	Oct	Nov	Dec	Year
Mean daily maximum °F (°C)	40.8 (4.9)	42.5 (5.8)	48.6 (9.2)	58.6 (14.8)	68.2 (20.1)	77.8 (25.4)	83.2 (28.4)	81.7 (27.6)	75.8 (24.3)	65.3 (18.5)	54.9 (12.7)	46.2 (7.9)	62.0 (16.7)
Daily mean °F (°C)	33.3 (0.7)	34.8 (1.6)	41.0 (5.0)	50.6 (10.3)	60.3 (15.7)	69.8 (21.0)	75.6 (24.2)	74.2 (23.4)	68.1 (20.1)	57.0 (13.9)	46.9 (8.3)	38.7 (3.7)	54.2 (12.3)
Mean daily minimum °F (°C)	25.8 (−3.4)	27.0 (−2.8)	33.4 (0.8)	42.7 (5.9)	52.3 (11.3)	61.9 (16.6)	67.9 (19.9)	66.7 (19.3)	60.4 (15.8)	48.6 (9.2)	38.8 (3.8)	31.2 (−0.4)	46.4 (8.0)
Average precipitation inches (mm)	3.79 (96)	3.14 (80)	4.32 (110)	3.77 (96)	3.67 (93)	4.16 (106)	4.19 (106)	4.50 (114)	3.80 (97)	4.24 (108)	3.50 (89)	4.60 (117)	47.69 (1,211)
Average relative humidity (%)	64.6	61.7	60.3	61.6	65.5	69.8	68.9	71.2	71.1	69.4	67.5	65.5	66.4
Average dew point °F (°C)	21.8 (−5.7)	22.9 (−5.1)	28.2 (−2.1)	37.7 (3.2)	48.4 (9.1)	59.2 (15.1)	64.2 (17.9)	64.0 (17.8)	57.6 (14.2)	46.4 (8.0)	36.9 (2.7)	27.0 (−2.8)	43.0 (6.1)
Source: PRISM

Climate data for Sandy Hook, NJ Ocean Water Temperature (22 N Spring Lake)
Month	Jan	Feb	Mar	Apr	May	Jun	Jul	Aug	Sep	Oct	Nov	Dec	Year
Daily mean °F (°C)	37 (3)	36 (2)	40 (4)	46 (8)	55 (13)	62 (17)	69 (21)	72 (22)	68 (20)	59 (15)	51 (11)	43 (6)	53 (12)
Source: NOAA

== Ecology ==
According to the A. W. Kuchler U.S. potential natural vegetation types, Spring Lake would have an Appalachian Oak (104) vegetation type with an Eastern Hardwood Forest (25) vegetation form.

== Notable people ==
People who were born in, residents of, or otherwise closely associated with Spring Lake include:

- Charles A. Agemian (1909–1996), banker who left Chase Manhattan Bank and became chairman and chief executive officer of Garden State National Bank
- George Ansbro (1915–2011), radio announcer for six decades on NBC and CBS
- Craig Biggio (born 1965), Houston Astros MLB hall of fame baseball player
- Abby Boyan (born 1999), professional women's soccer midfielder for the Utah Royals of the National Women's Soccer League
- Tom Brower (born 1965), member of the Hawaii House of Representatives
- Oliver Huff Brown (1852–1924), businessman and politician who was mayor of Spring Lake from 1894 until his death and served in both the New Jersey General Assembly and New Jersey Senate
- Chris Candido (1972–2005), professional wrestler
- Bill Carmody (born 1951), head basketball coach at Northwestern University
- Caroline Casagrande (born 1976), politician who represented the 12th and 11th Districts in the New Jersey General Assembly from 2008 to 2015
- Robert Chesebrough (1837–1933), inventor of Vaseline
- Katharine "Kerry" Close (born 1992), winner of the 79th annual Scripps National Spelling Bee in 2006
- John Francis Crosby (1889–1962), lawyer who served as the United States Attorney for the District of Connecticut
- Paul J. Curran (1933–2008), politician who served in the New York State Assembly and fought corruption as a federal prosecutor and as the state's commissioner of investigation
- Al DeRogatis (1927–1995), NY Giants football player and NBC television sportscaster
- Khigh Dhiegh (1910–1991), actor, starred in the original film version of The Manchurian Candidate
- Anne Evans Estabrook, real estate developer who was the frontrunner in the Republican primary for the 2008 United States Senate race in New Jersey before suffering a mini-stroke and withdrawing from the race
- Jack Ford, Court TV news anchor
- Mary Higgins Clark (1927–2020), writer whose 2001 book On the Street Where You Live was set in Spring Lake
- Kermit Love (1916–2008), creator of the Sesame Street characters Big Bird and Mr. Snuffleupagus
- Jim Manzi (born 1963), technology entrepreneur
- William Gibbs McAdoo (1863–1941), United States Secretary of the Treasury under President Wilson
- George T. McDonald (1944–2021), philanthropist and social worker who founded the homeless advocacy group The Doe Fund
- Gil McDougald (1928–2010), former New York Yankees infielder
- James P. Mitchell (1900–1964), United States Secretary of Labor from 1953 to 1961 during the Eisenhower Administration
- Vincent J. Murphy (1893–1976), Mayor of Newark, New Jersey, from 1941 to 1949
- Jack Nicholson (born 1937), actor
- Michael O'Hearn (born 2001) para-alpine skier who represented the United States at the 2026 Winter Paralympics in para-alpine skiing
- Wilbur Ross (born 1937), investor and banker who served as the 39th United States Secretary of Commerce from 2017 to 2021
- Lee Savold (1915–1972), heavyweight boxer who held the British and European version of the World Heavyweight championship between 1950 and 1951
- Sonny Senerchia (1931–2003), former Major League Baseball third baseman who played for the Pittsburgh Pirates in 1952
- John Wiggers (1917–2007), professional basketball player who played for the Akron Goodyear Wingfoots in the National Basketball League
- Charles D. Wrege (1924–2014), management historian and professor at Rutgers University

== Popular culture ==
Spring Lake is the setting for the Mary Higgins Clark novel On the Street Where You Live. Scenes of Ulu Grosbard's 1968 film The Subject Was Roses were filmed in Spring Lake. Indie rock band Vampire Weekend filmed a music video for their song "Cape Cod Kwassa Kwassa" in a home in Spring Lake, as well as on the beach. Spring Lake was used as a stand-in for turn-of-the-century Atlantic City, New Jersey, in the 1981 film Ragtime.

In John Frankenheimer's 1962 film The Manchurian Candidate, the character of Major Bennett Marco (played by Frank Sinatra) suffers from a nightmare set in Spring Lake. He imagines himself and his fellow soldiers sitting through a lecture by Mrs. Henry Whitaker of the Spring Lake Garden Club. A sign reveals the location of the lecture to be the fictional "Spring Lake Hotel". Eventually, the audience sees that the garden club meeting is merely an illusion and the platoon is actually at a meeting of Russian and Chinese officials in Manchuria. The Mrs. Whitaker character is actually a Chinese scientist named Dr. Yen Lo, portrayed by Spring Lake native Khigh Dhiegh.

Preceded by Belmar	Beaches of New Jersey	Succeeded by Sea Girt
