= Avon-by-the-Sea, New Jersey =

Borough in Monmouth County, New Jersey, US

- Borough
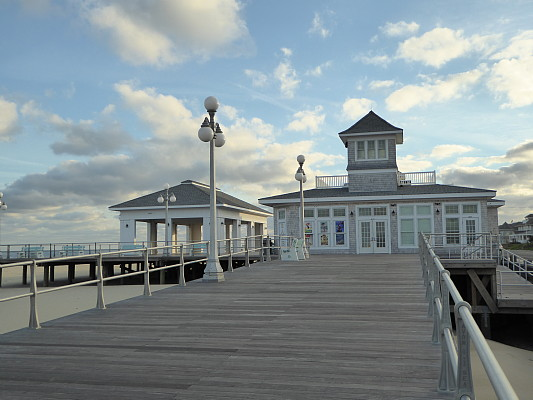
- New Pavilion in 2015

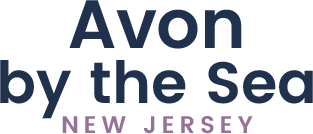
- wordmark

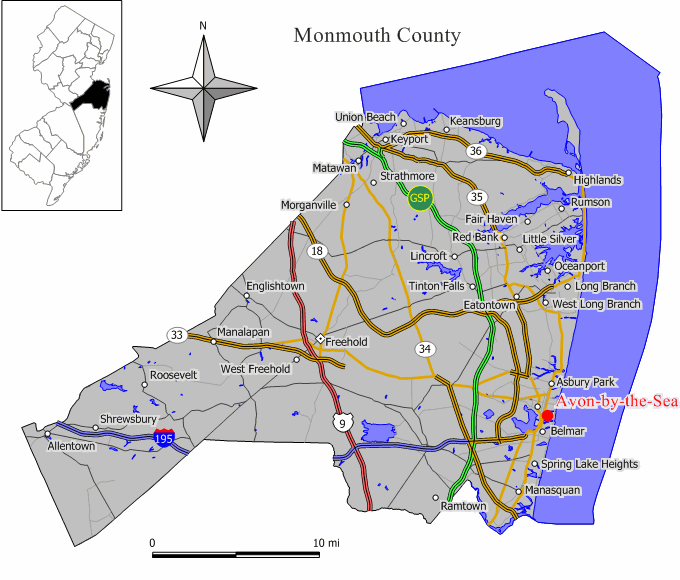
- Location of Avon-by-the-Sea in Monmouth County highlighted in red (right). Inset map: Location of Monmouth County in New Jersey highlighted in black (left).

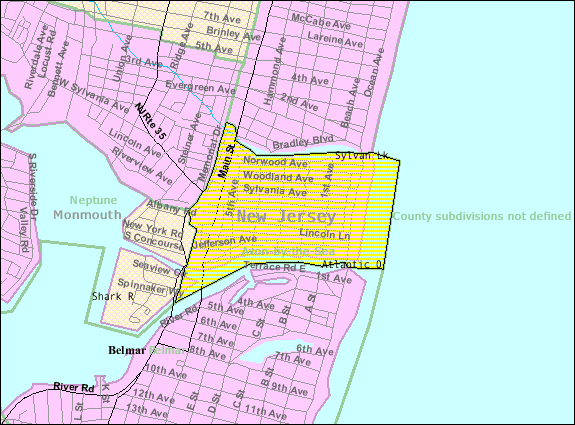
- Census Bureau map of Avon-by-the-Sea, New Jersey

- Location in Monmouth County Location in New Jersey Location in the United States
- Coordinates: 40.191418°N 74.015105°W
- Country: United States
- State: New Jersey
- County: Monmouth
- Incorporated: March 23, 1900
- Named for: Avon, England

Government
  - Type: Walsh Act
  - Body: Board of Commissioners
  - Mayor: Edward Bonanno (term ends December 31, 2027)
  - Administrator: Kerry McGuigan
  - Municipal clerk: Anna Bongiorno

Area
  - Total: 0.54 sq mi (1.40 km^{2})
  - Land: 0.42 sq mi (1.10 km^{2})
  - Water: 0.12 sq mi (0.30 km^{2}) 21.30%
  - Rank: 545th of 565 in state 47th of 53 in county
- Elevation: 10 ft (3.0 m)

Population (2020)
  - Total: 1,933
  - Estimate (2023): 1,933
  - Rank: 487th of 565 in state 42nd of 53 in county
  - Density: 4,542.3/sq mi (1,753.8/km^{2})
  - Rank: 128th of 565 in state 13th of 53 in county
- Time zone: UTC−05:00 (Eastern (EST))
  - Summer (DST): UTC−04:00 (Eastern (EDT))
- ZIP Code: 07717
- Area codes: 732
- FIPS code: 3402502440
- GNIS feature ID: 0885147
- Website: www.avonbytheseanj.com

Avon-by-the-Sea (often called simply Avon; pronunciation: /ævɒn/, AH-von) is a borough in Monmouth County, in the U.S. state of New Jersey. As of the 2020 United States census, the borough's population was 1,933, an increase of 32 (+1.7%) from the 2010 census count of 1,901, which in turn reflected a decline of 343 (−15.3%) from the 2,244 counted in the 2000 census.

Avon-by-the-Sea was incorporated as a borough by an act of the New Jersey Legislature on March 23, 1900, from portions of Neptune City. The borough was named for Avon, England, or for the Avon Inn, a hotel constructed in 1883.

In 2010, Forbes.com listed Avon-by-the-Sea as 232nd in its listing of "America's Most Expensive ZIP Codes", with a median home price of $989,212.

== Geography ==
According to the United States Census Bureau, the borough had a total area of 0.55 square miles (1.40 km^{2}) of which 0.43 square miles (1.10 km^{2}) are land and 0.12 square miles (0.30 km^{2}) are water (21.30%).

The borough borders the Monmouth County communities of Belmar, Bradley Beach, Neptune City and Neptune Township.

Avon-by-the-Sea is located on the Atlantic Ocean and is surrounded by two other bodies of water; the south side of Avon is located on the Shark River and the north end of Avon rests on Sylvan Lake.

== Demographics ==
Historical population
Census	Pop.	Note	%±
1910	426		—
1920	647		51.9%
1930	1,220		88.6%
1940	1,211		−0.7%
1950	1,650		36.3%
1960	1,707		3.5%
1970	2,163		26.7%
1980	2,337		8.0%
1990	2,165		−7.4%
2000	2,244		3.6%
2010	1,901		−15.3%
2020	1,933		1.7%
2023 (est.)	1,933	Steady	0.0%
Population sources: 1910–1920; 1910 1910–1930; 1940–2000; 2010 2020

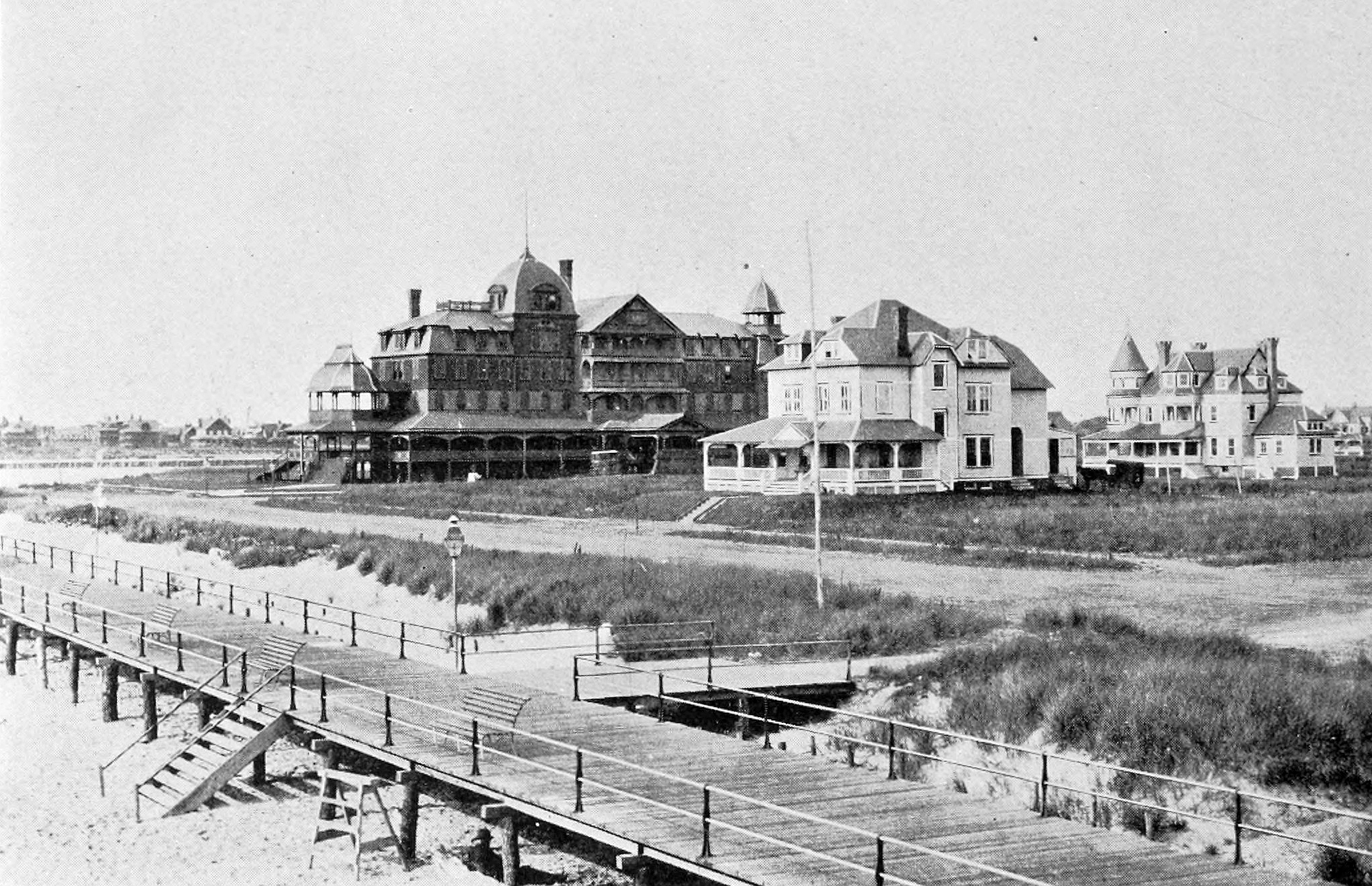
Avon-by-the-Sea, 1902

=== 2010 census ===
The 2010 United States census counted 1,901 people, 901 households, and 477 families in the borough. The population density was 4,459.1 per square mile (1,721.7/km^{2}). There were 1,321 housing units at an average density of 3,098.6 per square mile (1,196.4/km^{2}). The racial makeup was 96.95% (1,843) White, 0.32% (6) Black or African American, 0.00% (0) Native American, 0.63% (12) Asian, 0.00% (0) Pacific Islander, 1.26% (24) from other races, and 0.84% (16) from two or more races. Hispanic or Latino of any race were 3.73% (71) of the population.

Of the 901 households, 17.1% had children under the age of 18; 41.7% were married couples living together; 8.8% had a female householder with no husband present and 47.1% were non-families. Of all households, 40.8% were made up of individuals and 17.8% had someone living alone who was 65 years of age or older. The average household size was 2.11 and the average family size was 2.94.

16.8% of the population were under the age of 18, 6.9% from 18 to 24, 19.5% from 25 to 44, 32.8% from 45 to 64, and 23.9% who were 65 years of age or older. The median age was 49.1 years. For every 100 females, the population had 89.5 males. For every 100 females ages 18 and older there were 83.5 males.

The Census Bureau's 2006–2010 American Community Survey showed that (in 2010 inflation-adjusted dollars) median household income was $83,333 (with a margin of error of +/− $10,008) and the median family income was $113,750 (+/− $18,599). Males had a median income of $56,635 (+/− $32,033) versus $58,300 (+/− $5,223) for females. The per capita income for the borough was $58,063 (+/− $6,550). About 1.1% of families and 3.8% of the population were below the poverty line, including none of those under age 18 and 2.1% of those age 65 or over.

=== 2000 census ===
As of the 2000 United States census there were 2,244 people, 1,043 households, and 535 families residing in the borough. The population density was 5,262.9 inhabitants per square mile (2,032.0/km^{2}). There were 1,387 housing units at an average density of 3,253.0 per square mile (1,256.0/km^{2}). The racial makeup of the borough was 97.15% White, 0.53% African American, 0.45% Native American, 0.89% Asian, 0.62% from other races, and 0.36% from two or more races. Hispanic or Latino of any race were 2.41% of the population.

As of the 2000 Census, 36.5% of Avon-by-the-Sea residents were of Irish ancestry, the third-highest percentage of any municipality in the United States, and second-highest in New Jersey, among all places with more than 1,000 residents identifying their ancestry.

There were 1,043 households, out of which 18.6% had children under the age of 18 living with them, 42.8% were married couples living together, 6.4% had a female householder with no husband present, and 48.7% were non-families. 41.1% of all households were made up of individuals, and 18.5% had someone living alone who was 65 years of age or older. The average household size was 2.15 and the average family size was 3.04.

In the borough the population was spread out, with 18.4% under the age of 18, 4.8% from 18 to 24, 28.7% from 25 to 44, 25.8% from 45 to 64, and 22.3% who were 65 years of age or older. The median age was 44 years. For every 100 females, there were 93.4 males. For every 100 females age 18 and over, there were 87.4 males.

The median income for a household in the borough was $60,192, and the median income for a family was $80,605. Males had a median income of $53,125 versus $35,857 for females. The per capita income for the borough was $41,238. About 2.3% of families and 2.7% of the population were below the poverty line, including 3.0% of those under age 18 and 4.4% of those age 65 or over.

== Government ==
=== Local government ===
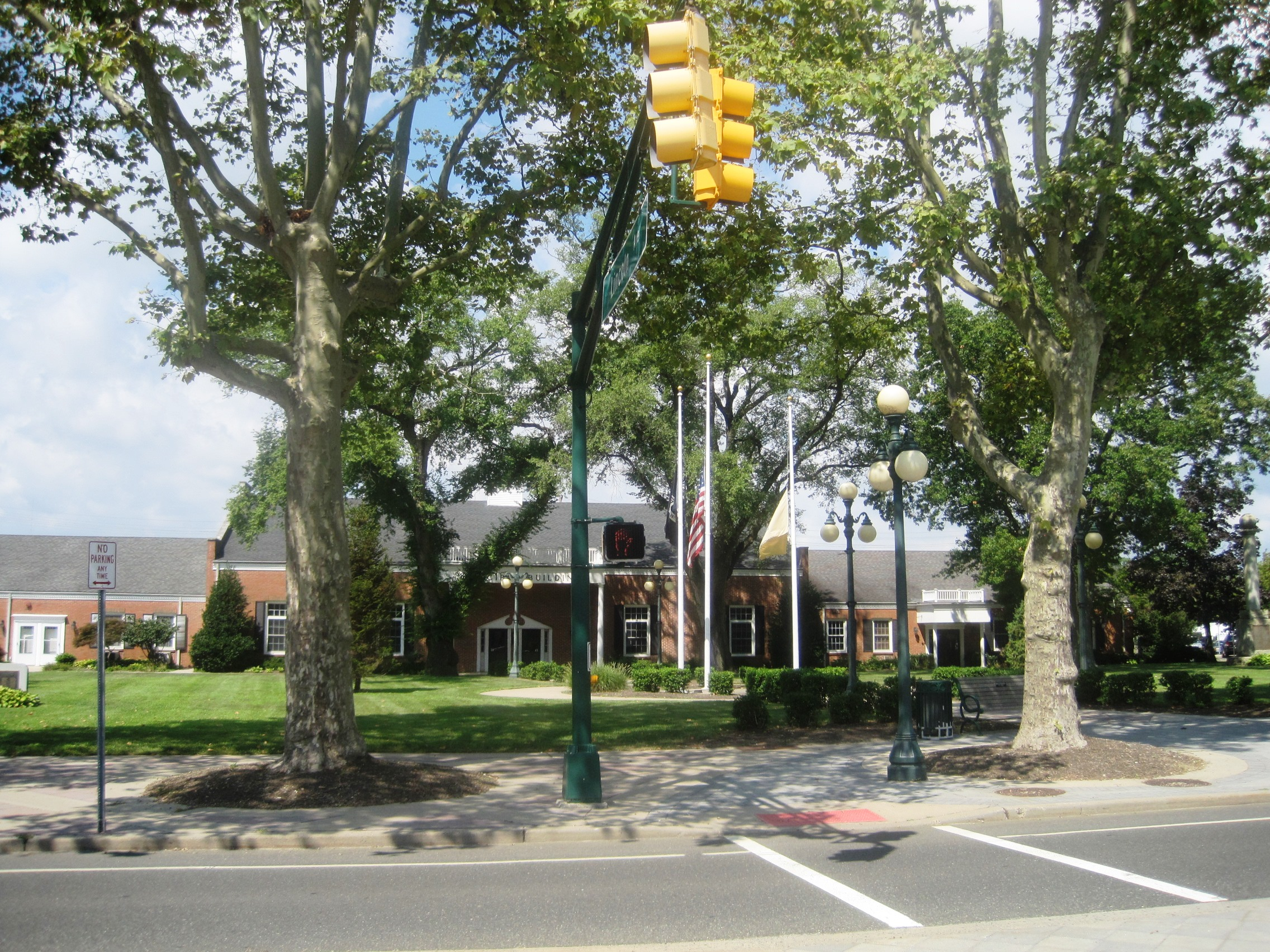
Municipal building

Avon-by-the-Sea has governed under the Walsh Act since 1919. The borough is one of 30 municipalities (of the 564) statewide that use the commission form of government. The governing body is comprised of three commissioners who are elected at-large on a non-partisan basis as part of the November general election to serve four-year terms of office on a concurrent basis. At a reorganization meeting after each election, each commissioner is assigned a department to administer and oversee; one of the commissioners is chosen to serve as mayor.

As of 2025, members of the Avon-by-the-Sea Board of Commissioners are Mayor Edward R. Bonanno (Commissioner of Public Affairs and Public Safety), Michelle Devoy (Commissioner of Public Works, Parks and Public Property) and John B. Magrini (Commissioner of Revenue and Finance), all serving concurrent terms of office that end December 31, 2027.

=== Federal, state and county representation ===
Avon-by-the-Sea is located in the 4th Congressional district and is part of New Jersey's 30th state legislative district.

For the 119th United States Congress, New Jersey's 4th congressional district is represented by Chris Smith (R, Manchester Township). New Jersey is represented in the United States Senate by Democrats Cory Booker (Newark, term ends 2027) and Andy Kim (Moorestown, term ends 2031).

For the 2026–2027 session, the 30th legislative district of the New Jersey Legislature is represented in the State Senate by Robert Singer (R, Lakewood Township) and in the General Assembly by Sean T. Kean (R, Wall Township) and Avi Schnall (D, Lakewood Township).

Monmouth County is governed by a Board of County Commissioners composed of five members who are elected at-large to serve three-year terms of office on a staggered basis, with either one or two seats up for election each year as part of the November general election. At an annual reorganization meeting held in the beginning of January, the board selects one of its members to serve as director and another as deputy director.

As of 2025, Monmouth County's Commissioners are Director Thomas A. Arnone (R, Neptune City, 2025), Susan M. Kiley (R, Hazlet Township, 2027), Erik Anderson (R, Shrewsbury, 2026), Nick DiRocco (R, Wall Township, 2025), and Deputy Director Ross F. Licitra (R, Marlboro Township, 2026).

Constitutional officers elected on a countywide basis are Clerk Christine Giordano Hanlon (R, 2025; Ocean Township), Sheriff Shaun Golden (R, 2025; Howell Township) and Surrogate Rosemarie D. Peters (R, 2026; Middletown Township).

=== Politics ===
United States presidential election results for Avon-By-The-Sea
Year	Republican		Democratic		Third party(ies)	
Year	No.	%	No.	%	No.	%
2024	694	54.86%	542	42.85%	29	2.29%
2020	664	50.11%	649	48.98%	12	0.91%
2016	625	64.30%	304	31.28%	43	4.42%
2012	662	63.29%	373	35.66%	11	1.05%
2008	680	58.17%	480	41.06%	9	0.77%
2004	759	62.16%	459	37.59%	3	0.25%
2000	672	56.85%	449	37.99%	61	5.16%
1996	559	50.96%	439	40.02%	99	9.02%
1992	648	54.41%	390	32.75%	153	12.85%

As of March 2011, there were a total of 1,465 registered voters in Avon-by-the-Sea, of which 379 (25.9%) were registered as Democrats, 415 (28.3%) were registered as Republicans and 670 (45.7%) were registered as Unaffiliated. There was one voter registered to another party.

Gubernatorial election results for Avon-by-the-Sea
Year	Republican		Democratic		Third party(ies)	
Year	No.	%	No.	%	No.	%
2025	626	58.23%	446	41.49%	3	0.28%
2021	568	61.08%	351	37.74%	11	1.18%
2017	493	60.57%	310	38.08%	11	1.35%
2013	600	75.38%	183	22.99%	13	1.63%
2009	583	64.63%	269	29.82%	50	5.54%
2005	522	58.92%	341	38.49%	23	2.60%

In the 2012 presidential election, Republican Mitt Romney received 63.3% of the vote (662 cast), ahead of Democrat Barack Obama with 35.7% (373 votes), and other candidates with 1.1% (11 votes), among the 1,053 ballots cast by the borough's 1,530 registered voters (7 ballots were spoiled), for a turnout of 68.8%. In the 2008 presidential election, Republican John McCain received 57.2% of the vote (680 cast), ahead of Democrat Barack Obama with 40.4% (480 votes) and other candidates with 0.8% (9 votes), among the 1,189 ballots cast by the borough's 1,520 registered voters, for a turnout of 78.2%. In the 2004 presidential election, Republican George W. Bush received 61.5% of the vote (759 ballots cast), outpolling Democrat John Kerry with 37.2% (459 votes) and other candidates with 0.2% (3 votes), among the 1,234 ballots cast by the borough's 1,605 registered voters, for a turnout percentage of 76.9.

In the 2013 gubernatorial election, Republican Chris Christie received 75.4% of the vote (600 cast), ahead of Democrat Barbara Buono with 23.0% (183 votes), and other candidates with 1.6% (13 votes), among the 812 ballots cast by the borough's 1,502 registered voters (16 ballots were spoiled), for a turnout of 54.1%. In the 2009 gubernatorial election, Republican Chris Christie received 64.1% of the vote (583 ballots cast), ahead of Democrat Jon Corzine with 29.6% (269 votes), Independent Chris Daggett with 5.1% (46 votes) and other candidates with 0.4% (4 votes), among the 909 ballots cast by the borough's 1,484 registered voters, yielding a 61.3% turnout.

United States Senate election results for Avon-by-the-Sea1
Year	Republican		Democratic		Third party(ies)	
Year	No.	%	No.	%	No.	%
2024	724	58.34%	506	40.77%	11	0.89%
2018	591	61.69%	337	35.18%	30	3.13%
2012	653	66.03%	331	33.47%	5	0.51%
2006	526	60.05%	339	38.70%	11	1.26%

United States Senate election results for Avon-by-the-Sea2
Year	Republican		Democratic		Third party(ies)	
Year	No.	%	No.	%	No.	%
2020	711	54.32%	581	44.39%	17	1.30%
2014	408	60.09%	258	38.00%	13	1.91%
2013	316	60.42%	204	39.01%	3	0.57%
2008	632	58.20%	435	40.06%	19	1.75%

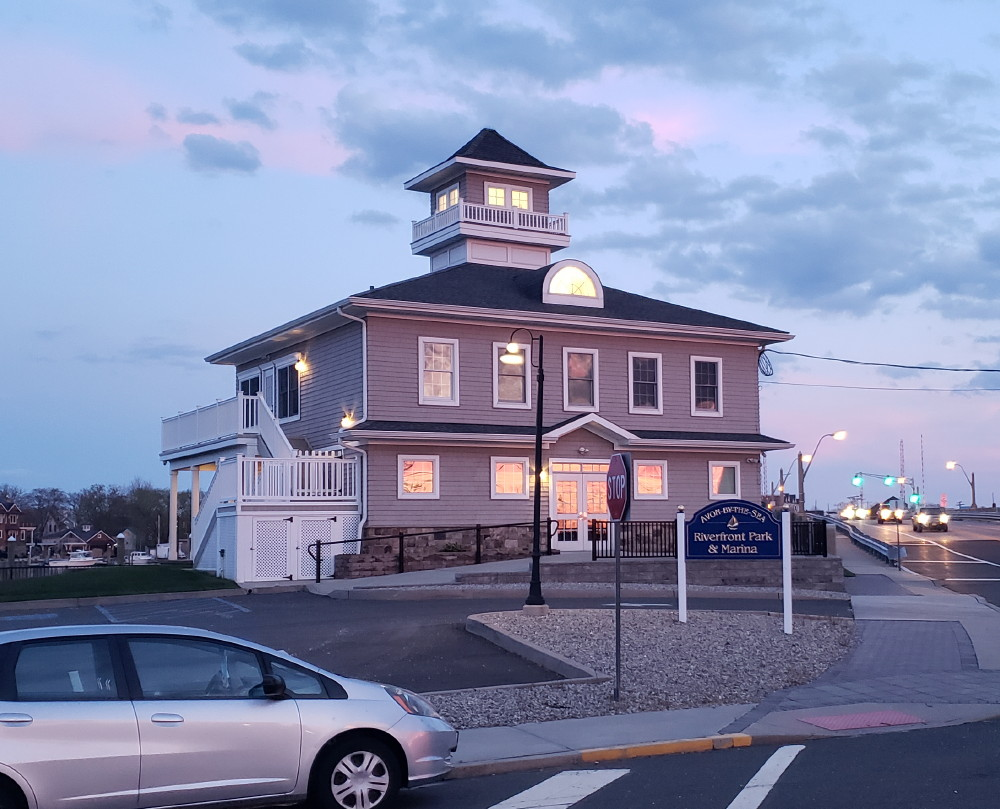
Avon by the Sea Municipal Marina, 2021

Boardwalk

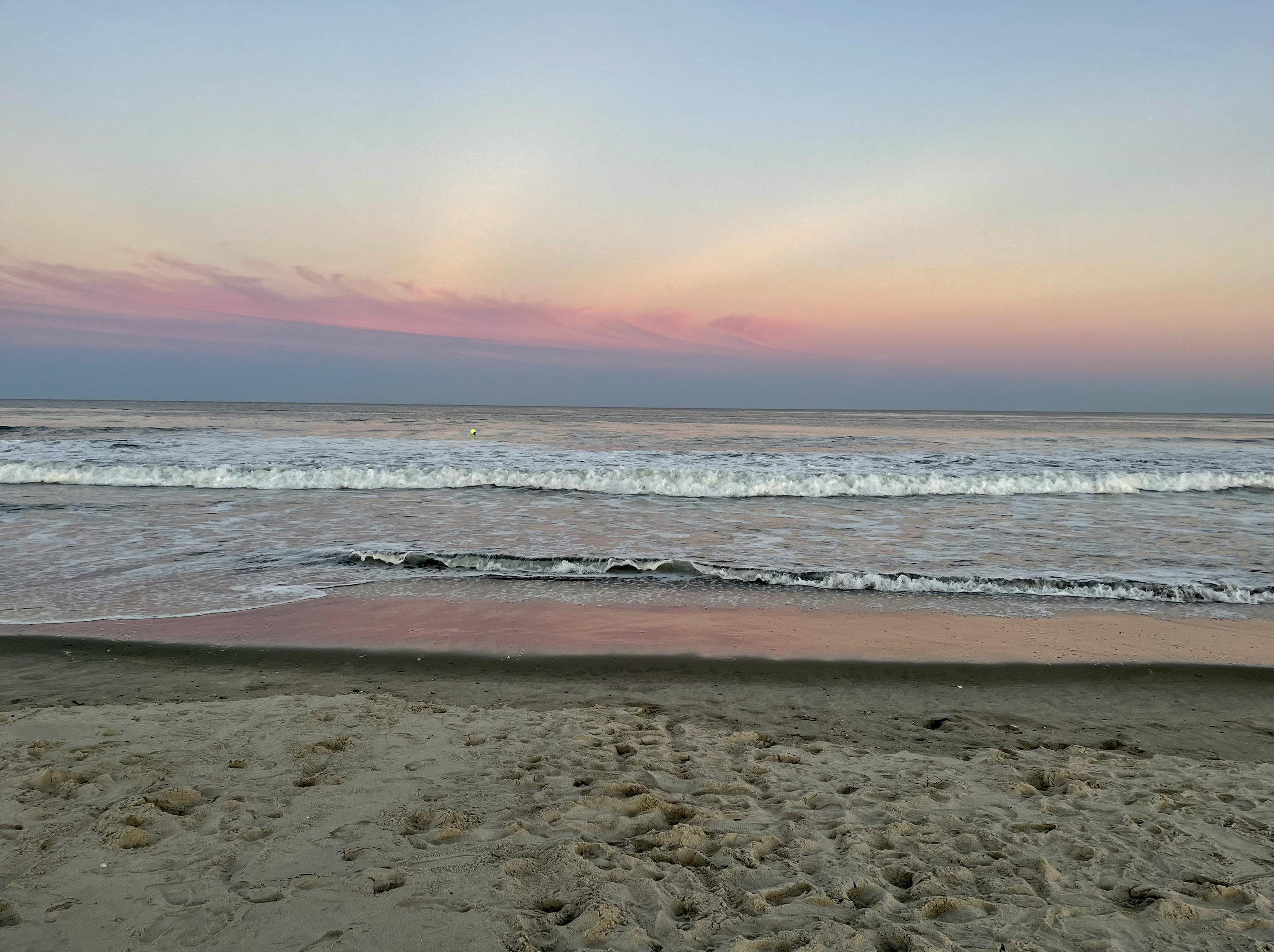
Sunset

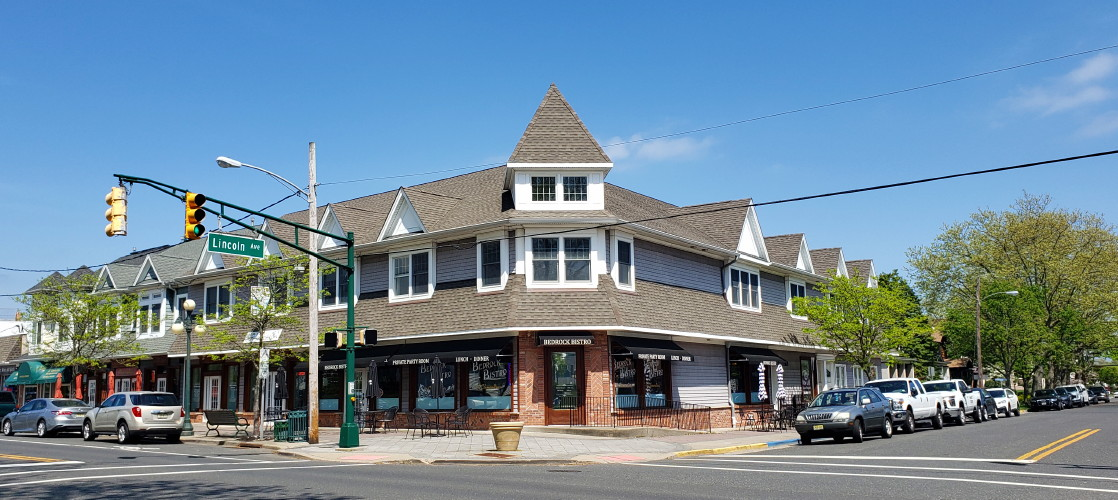
Main Street, Avon by the Sea, NJ

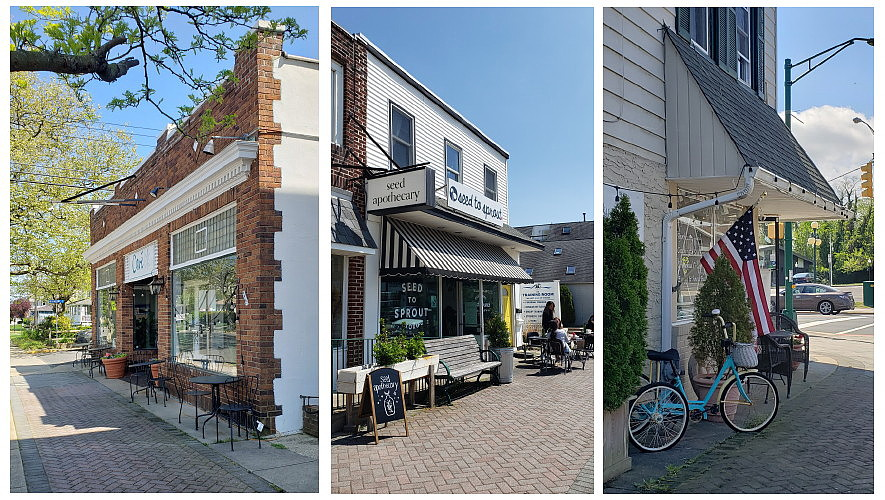
Businesses near Main St, Avon by the Sea, NJ.

== Education ==
The Avon School District serves public school students in pre-kindergarten through eighth grade at Avon Elementary School. As of the 2022–23 school year, the district, comprised of one school, had an enrollment of 121 students and 17.9 classroom teachers (on an FTE basis), for a student–teacher ratio of 6.8:1. During the 2016–17 school year, Avon was tied with the 23rd smallest enrollment of any school district in the state, with 158 students.

For ninth through twelfth grades, public school students attend either Asbury Park High School or Manasquan High School, as part of sending/receiving relationships with the respective districts, based on the results of a lottery under which 62.5% of students are sent to Manasquan and 37.5% to Asbury Park. As of the 2022–23 school year, Asbury Park High School had an enrollment of 607 students and 50.0 classroom teachers (on an FTE basis), for a student–teacher ratio of 12.1:1,

The Manasquan school also serves students from Belmar, Brielle, Lake Como, Sea Girt, Spring Lake, Spring Lake Heights who attend as part of sending/receiving relationships with their respective districts. As of the 2022–23 school year, Manasquan High School had an enrollment of 948 students and 82.8 classroom teachers (on an FTE basis), for a student–teacher ratio of 11.5:1.

Students may also apply to academy schools in the Monmouth County Vocational School District, which include the Academy of Allied Health & Science, Biotechnology High School, High Technology High School, Marine Academy of Science and Technology and Communications High School. Students also have the option to attend Academy Charter High School in Lake Como, which accepts students on a lottery basis from the communities of Allenhurst, Asbury Park, Avon-by-the-Sea, Belmar, Bradley Beach, Deal, Interlaken and Lake Como.

== Transportation ==
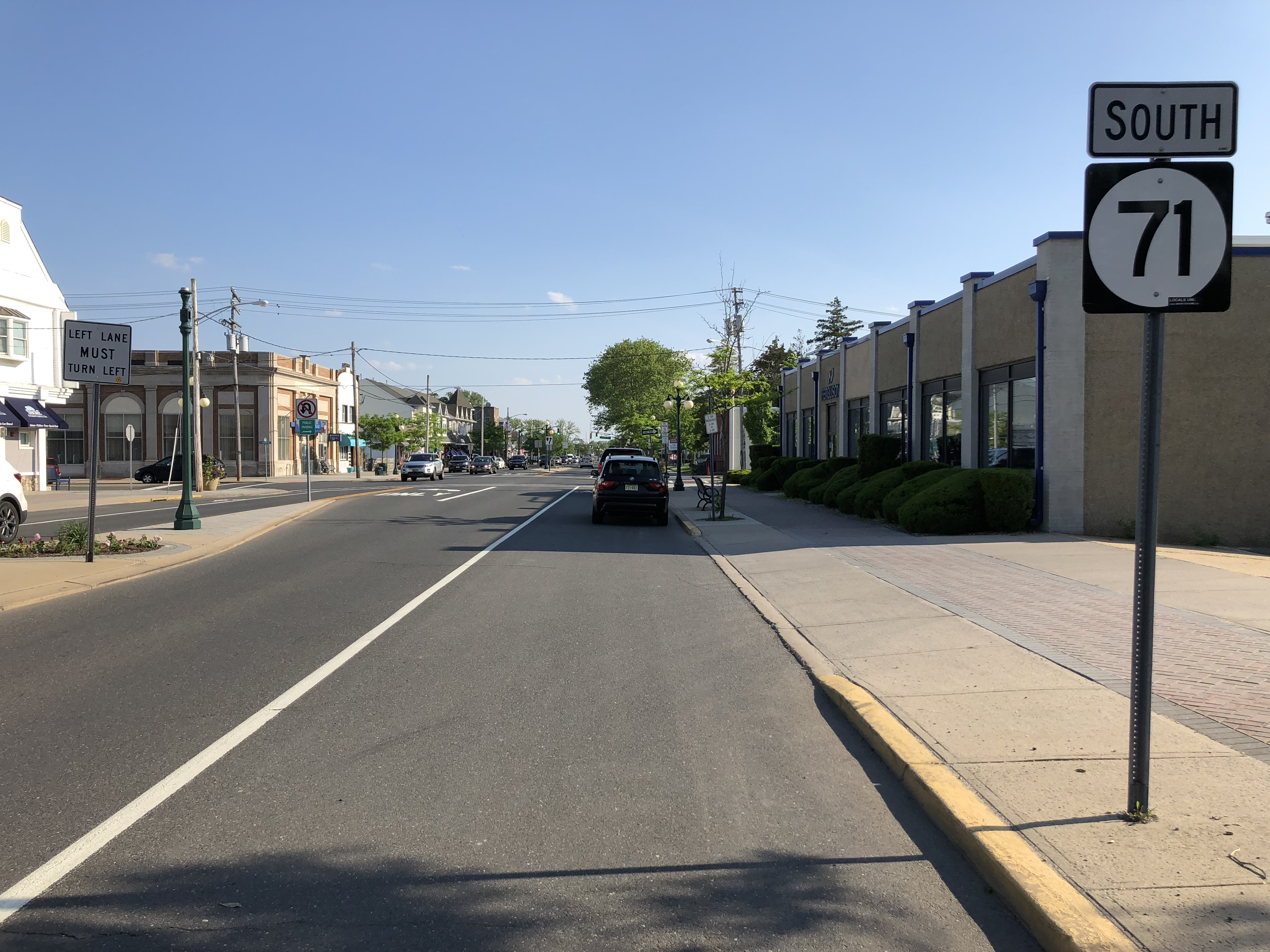
Route 71 in Avon-by-the-Sea

=== Roads and highways ===
As of May 2010, the borough had a total of 13.29 miles (21.39 km) of roadways, of which 11.07 miles (17.82 km) were maintained by the municipality, 1.48 miles (2.38 km) by Monmouth County and 0.74 miles (1.19 km) by the New Jersey Department of Transportation.

Route 71 is the main north–south road that passes through. Route 35 is immediately outside the borough, and provides access to Route 138/Interstate 195. The Garden State Parkway is also nearby.

=== Public transportation ===
NJ Transit provides bus transportation to Philadelphia on the 317 route and local service on the 830 route. The closest NJ transit train service is at the Belmar and Bradley Beach stations. on the North Jersey Coast Line.

== Climate ==
According to the Köppen climate classification system, Avon-by-the-Sea has a Humid subtropical climate (Cfa).

Climate data for Avon-by-the-Sea (40.1922, -74.0159), Elevation 7 ft (2 m), 1991–2020 normals, extremes 1981–2022
Month	Jan	Feb	Mar	Apr	May	Jun	Jul	Aug	Sep	Oct	Nov	Dec	Year
Record high °F (°C)	71.5 (21.9)	78.7 (25.9)	82.2 (27.9)	89.4 (31.9)	94.9 (34.9)	96.7 (35.9)	99.8 (37.7)	100.3 (37.9)	97.4 (36.3)	93.6 (34.2)	80.5 (26.9)	74.9 (23.8)	100.3 (37.9)
Mean daily maximum °F (°C)	40.9 (4.9)	42.6 (5.9)	48.6 (9.2)	58.7 (14.8)	68.2 (20.1)	77.7 (25.4)	83.2 (28.4)	81.6 (27.6)	75.9 (24.4)	65.4 (18.6)	54.9 (12.7)	46.2 (7.9)	62.1 (16.7)
Mean daily minimum °F (°C)	25.9 (−3.4)	27.1 (−2.7)	33.4 (0.8)	42.7 (5.9)	52.3 (11.3)	61.9 (16.6)	68.0 (20.0)	66.7 (19.3)	60.6 (15.9)	48.7 (9.3)	38.9 (3.8)	31.3 (−0.4)	46.6 (8.1)
Record low °F (°C)	−5.8 (−21.0)	0.9 (−17.3)	5.9 (−14.5)	18.3 (−7.6)	34.4 (1.3)	45.0 (7.2)	49.2 (9.6)	45.5 (7.5)	39.7 (4.3)	26.9 (−2.8)	14.8 (−9.6)	0.1 (−17.7)	−5.8 (−21.0)
Average precipitation inches (mm)	3.78 (96)	3.13 (80)	4.30 (109)	3.82 (97)	3.75 (95)	4.14 (105)	4.19 (106)	4.71 (120)	3.85 (98)	4.23 (107)	3.45 (88)	4.61 (117)	47.96 (1,218)
Average snowfall inches (cm)	8.9 (23)	7.4 (19)	4.1 (10)	0.1 (0.25)	0.0 (0.0)	0.0 (0.0)	0.0 (0.0)	0.0 (0.0)	0.0 (0.0)	0.0 (0.0)	0.3 (0.76)	3.4 (8.6)	24.2 (61)
Average dew point °F (°C)	22.4 (−5.3)	23.0 (−5.0)	28.1 (−2.2)	37.2 (2.9)	48.6 (9.2)	59.4 (15.2)	64.6 (18.1)	64.1 (17.8)	58.6 (14.8)	47.1 (8.4)	36.2 (2.3)	28.3 (−2.1)	43.2 (6.2)
Source 1: PRISM
Source 2: NOHRSC (Snow, 2008/2009 - 2022/2023 normals)

== Ecology ==
According to the A. W. Kuchler U.S. potential natural vegetation types, Avon-by-the-Sea would have a dominant vegetation type of Northern Cordgrass Spartina (73) with a dominant vegetation form of Coastal Prairie (20).

== Notable people ==
People who were born in, residents of, or otherwise closely associated with Avon-by-the-Sea include:

- Leo P. Carlin (1908–1999), Mayor of Newark, New Jersey from 1953 to 1962
- Pat Delany, basketball coach who has worked in various coaching positions in the NBA
- Bronson Howard (1842–1908), dramatist
- Mischa Levitzki (1898–1941), concert pianist
- Bob Scrabis (born 1936), former American football player who played with the New York Titans
- Bob Scrabis (born c. 1967), former college basketball player for the Princeton Tigers men's basketball team
- E. Donald Sterner (1894–1983), lumberman and politician who served in both houses of the New Jersey Legislature and as chairman of the New Jersey Republican State Committee

Preceded by Bradley Beach	Beaches of New Jersey	Succeeded by Belmar
