= Jersey Shore =

Coastal region of the U.S. state of New Jersey

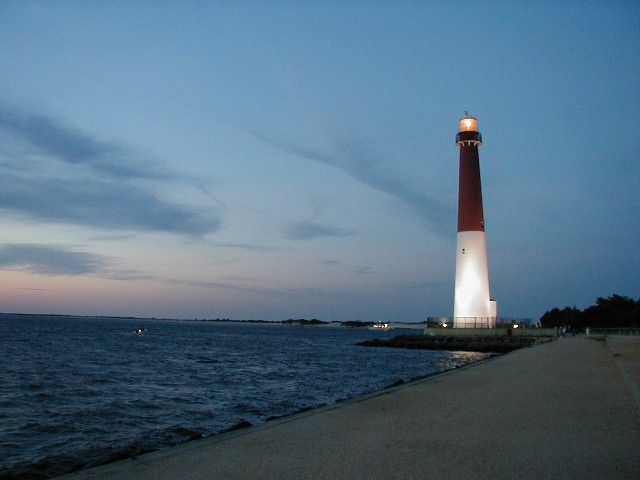
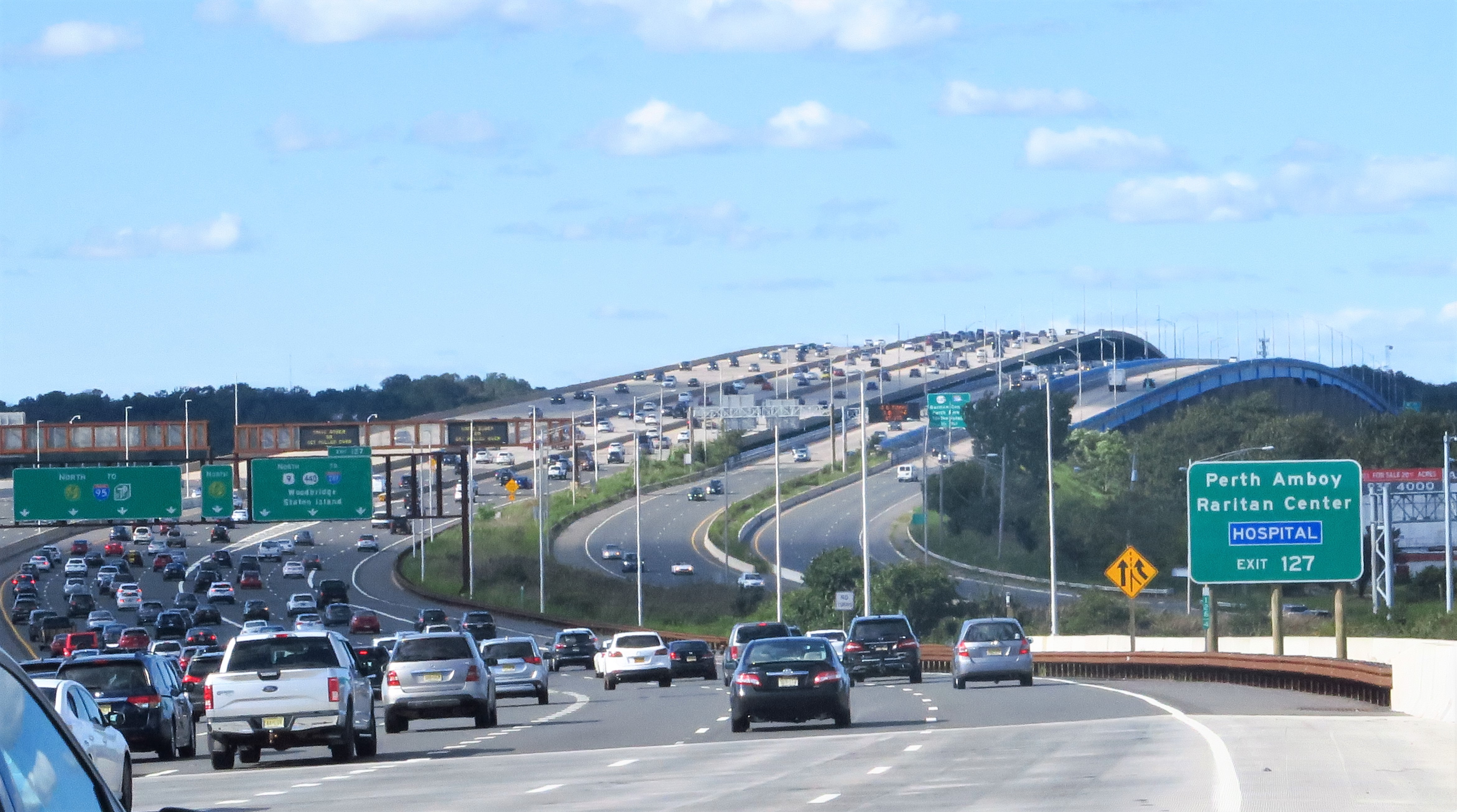
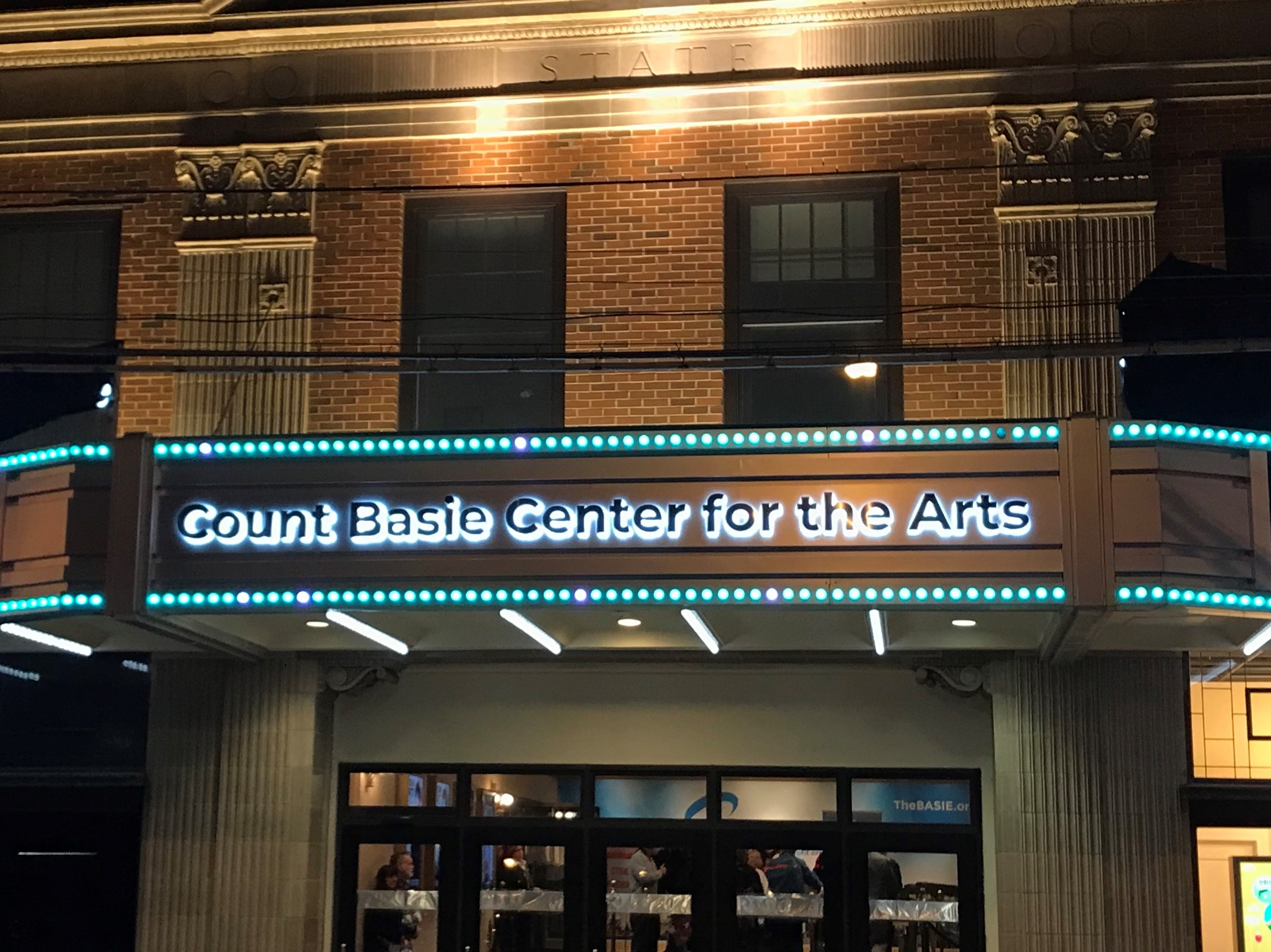
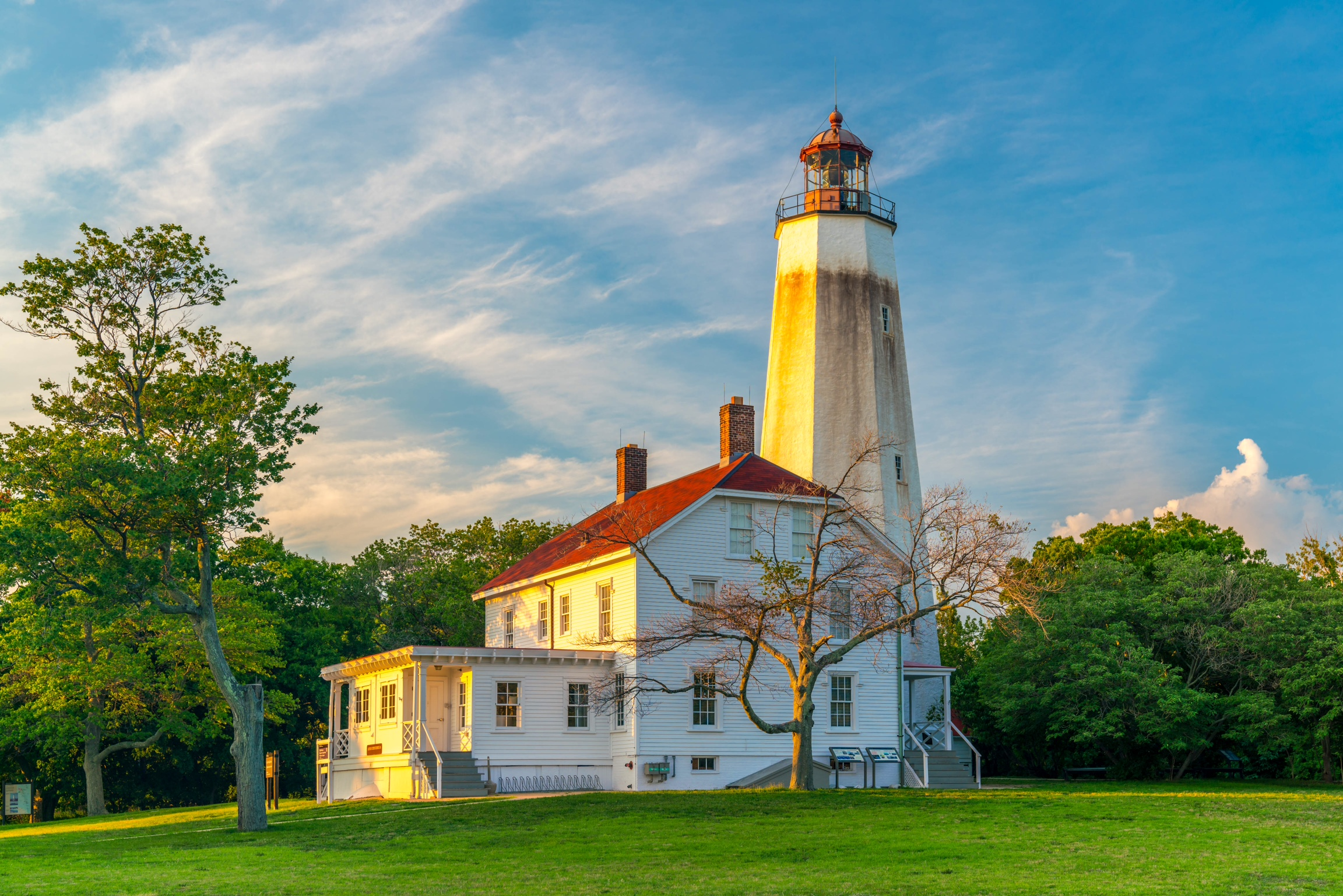
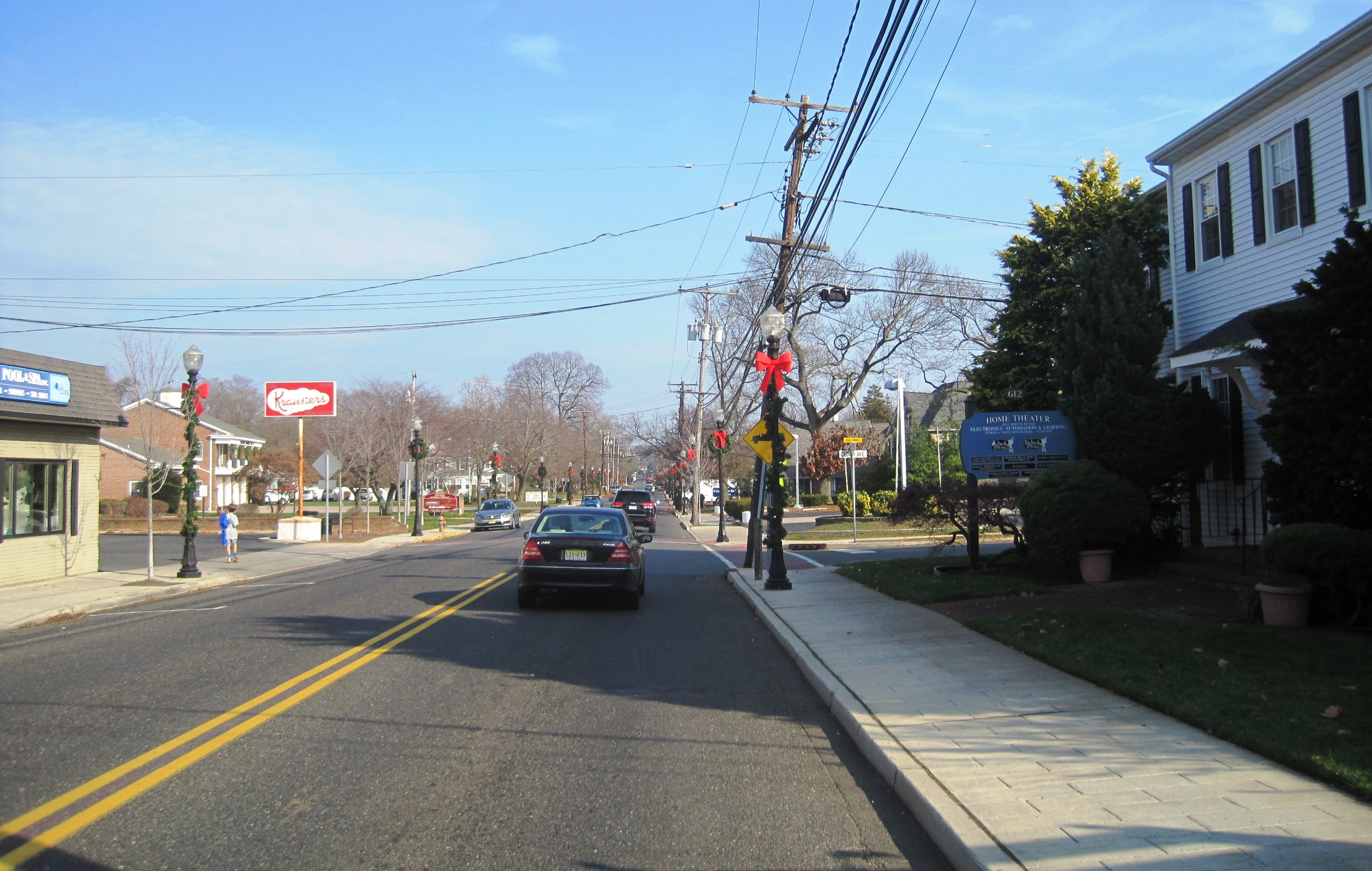
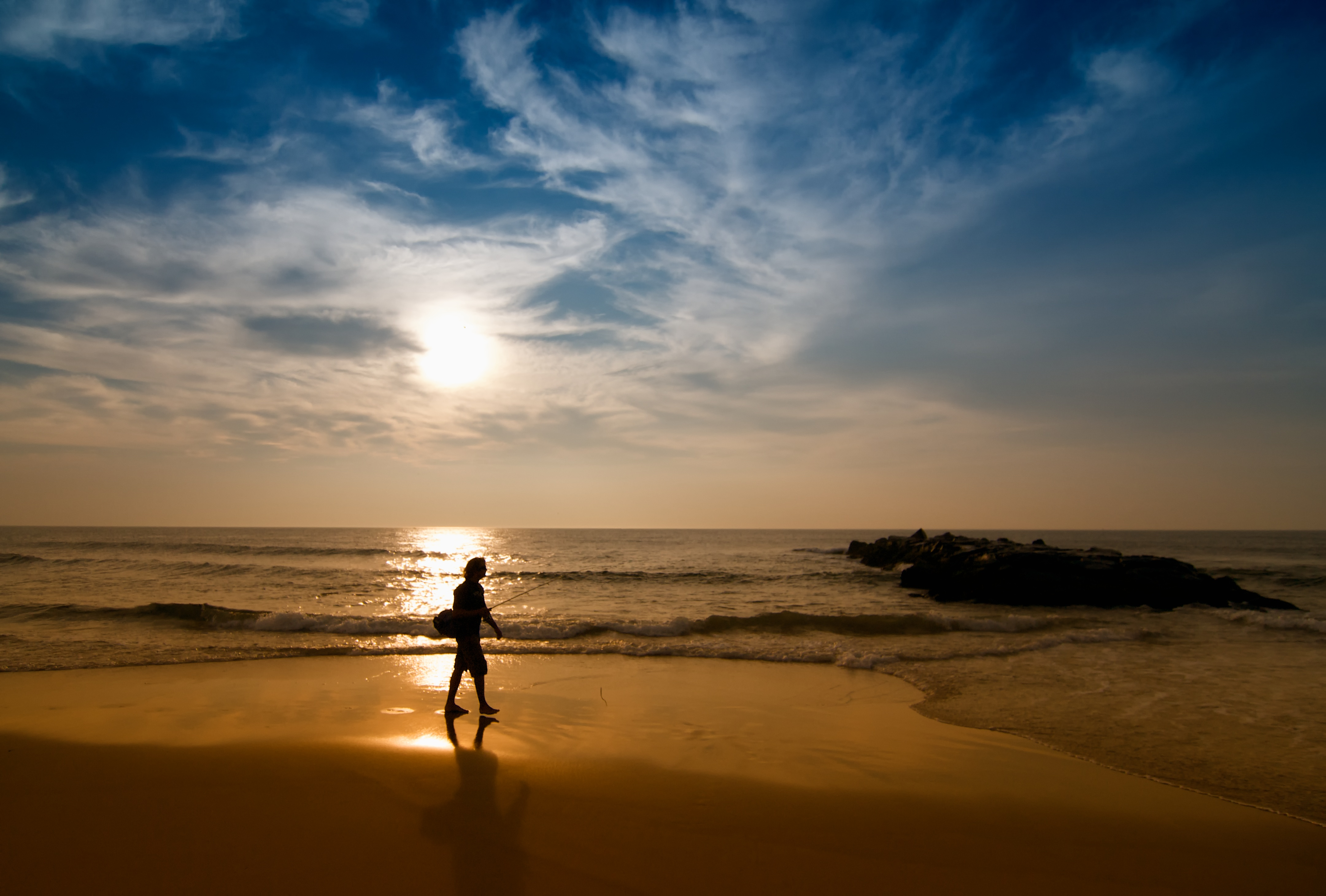
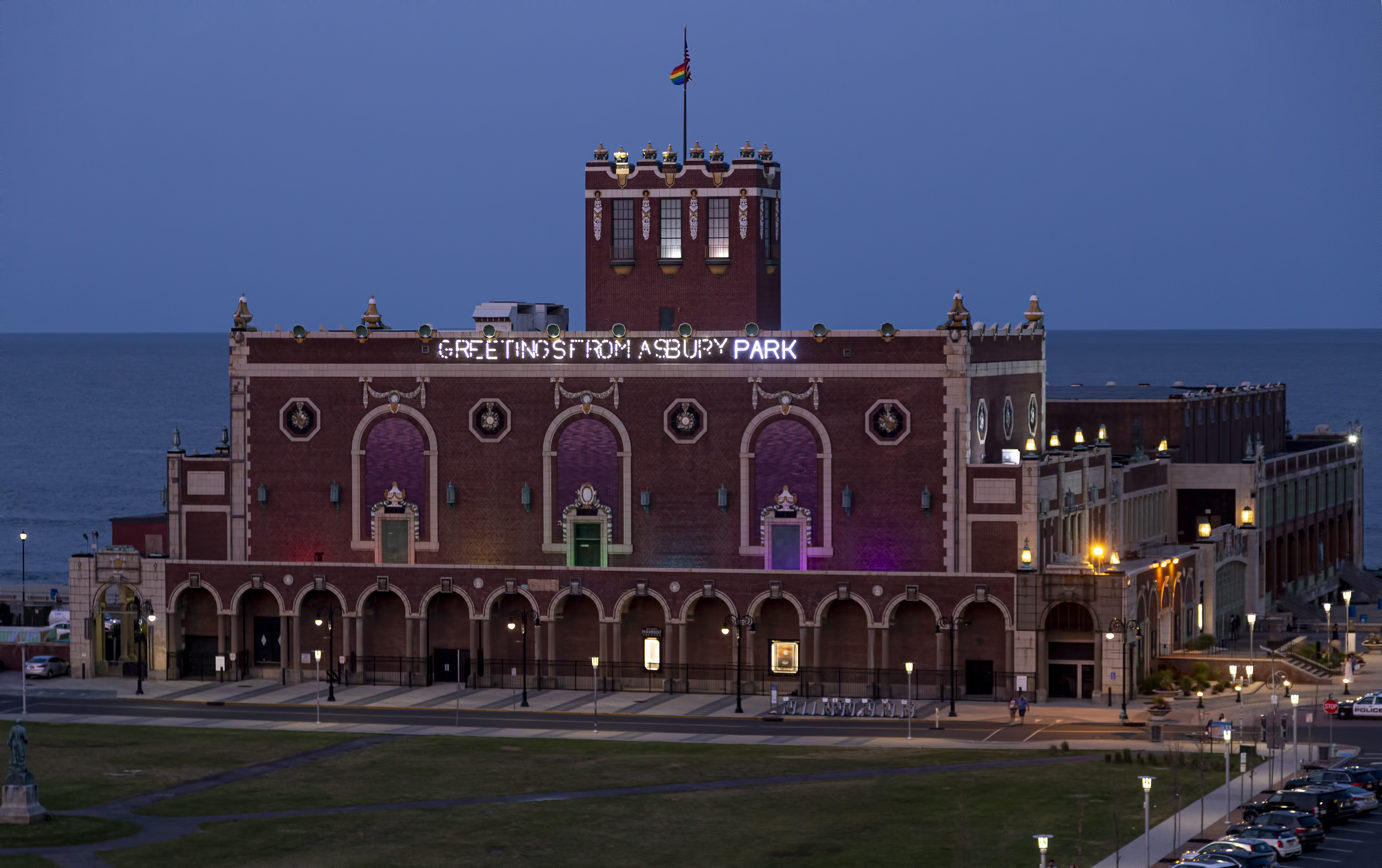
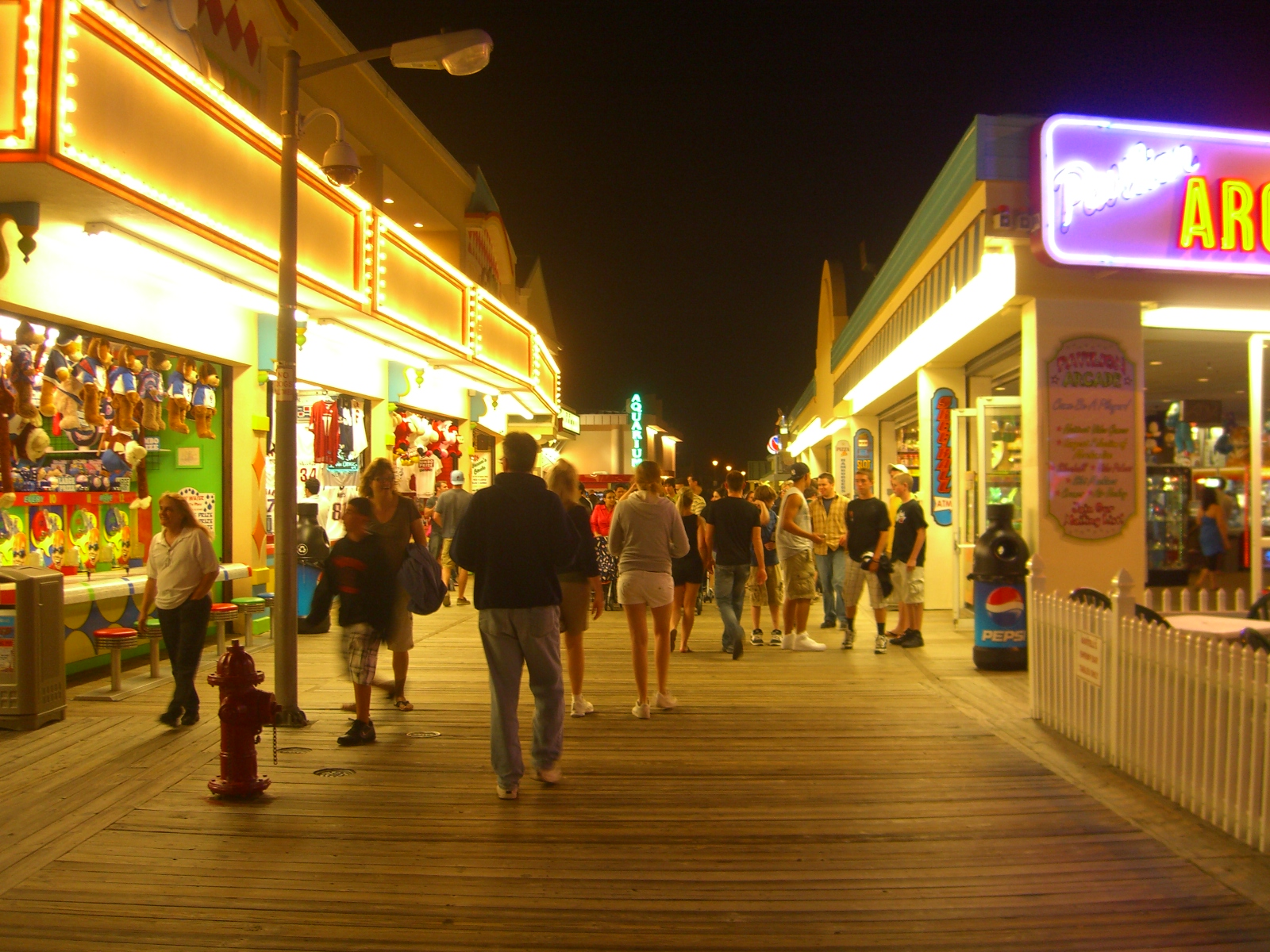
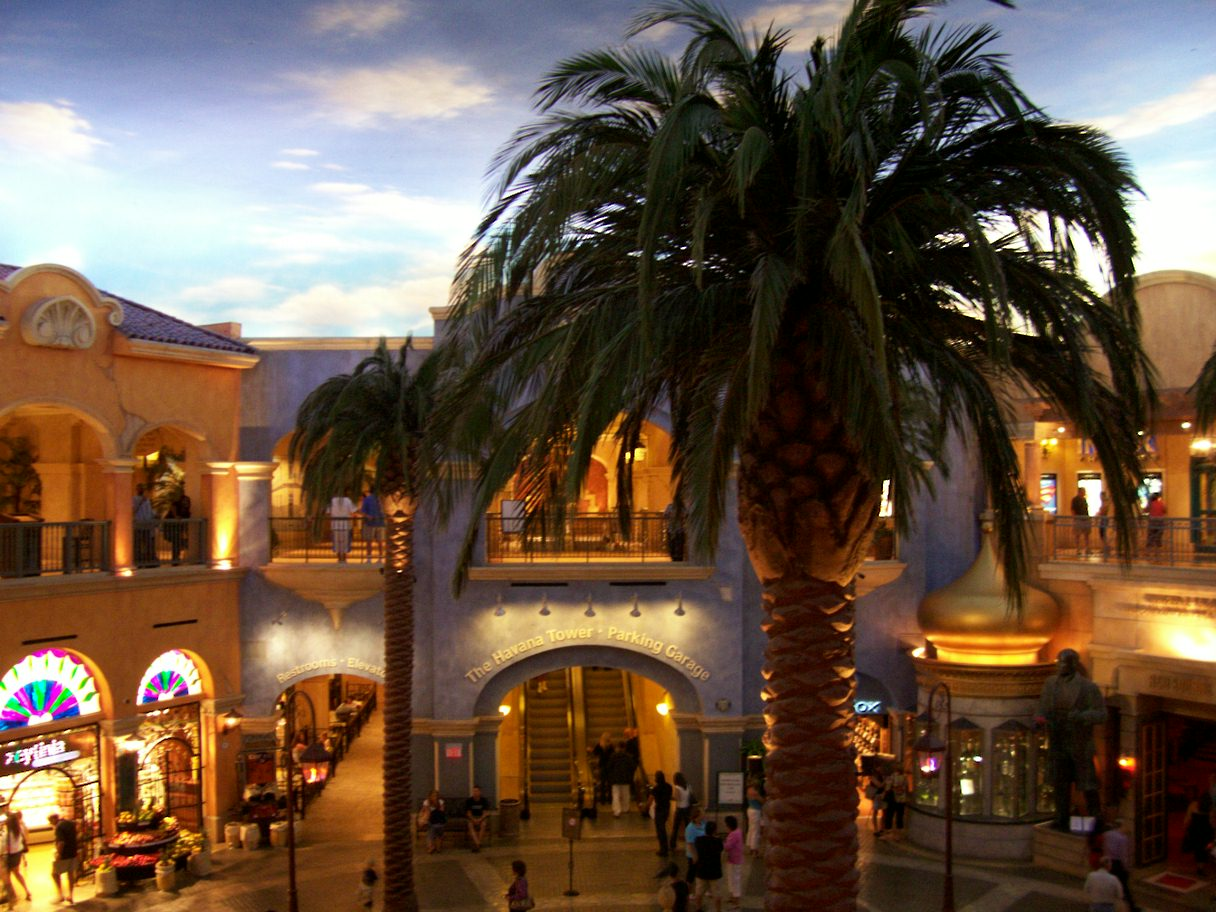
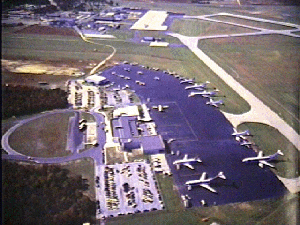
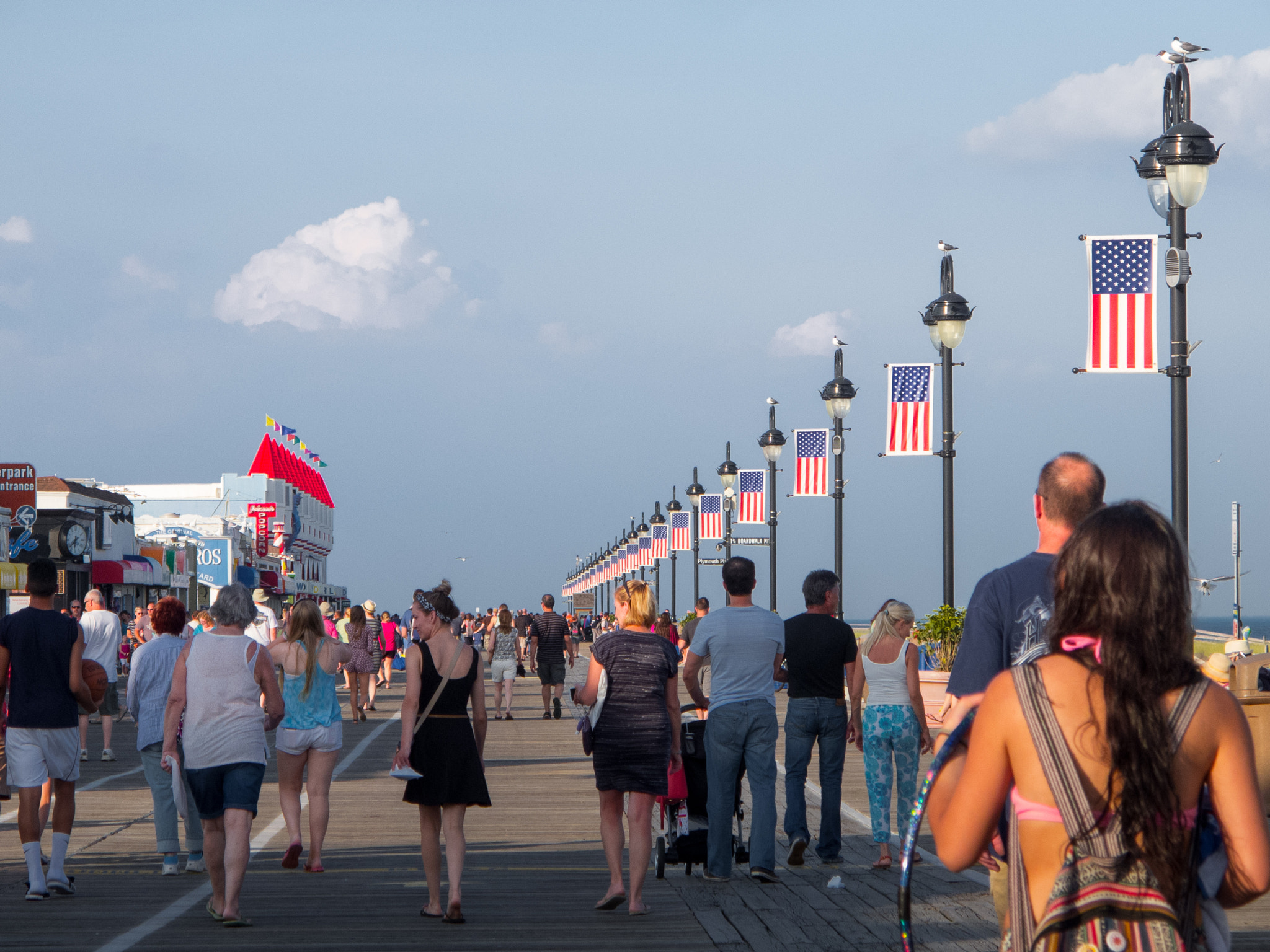
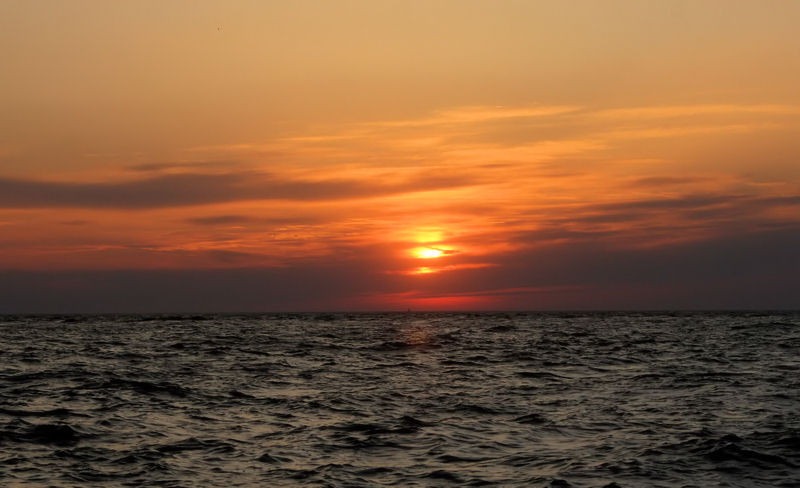
- Barnegat Lighthouse Driscoll Bridge Count Basie Center for the Arts Sandy Hook Light Main Street in Fair Haven Sunrise at Spring Lake Paramount Theatre and Asbury Park Convention Hall in Asbury Park Jenkinson's Boardwalk on Point Pleasant Beach Tropicana Casino & Resort in Atlantic City Atlantic City International Airport Ocean City Boardwalk Sunset from Sunset Beach at Cape May Point
- Continent: North America
- Region: Northeastern United States
- Coordinates: 39.7632°N 74.1064°W
- Coastline: 141 mi (227 km)
- Highest point: Mount Mitchill
- Lowest point: Atlantic Ocean
- Longest river: Raritan River
- Largest lake: Manasquan Reservoir
- Climate: Humid subtropical climate
- Terrain: Atlantic Coastal Plain
- Natural resources: Atlantic Ocean

The Jersey Shore, commonly called the Shore by locals, is the coastal region of the U.S. state of New Jersey. The term encompasses about 141 miles (227 km) of oceanfront bordering the Atlantic Ocean, from Perth Amboy in the north to Cape May Point in the south. The region includes Monmouth, Ocean, Atlantic, and Cape May counties, which are in the central and southern parts of the state. Located in the center of the Northeast Megalopolis, the northern half of the shore region is part of the New York metropolitan area, while the southern half of the shore region is part of the Philadelphia metropolitan area. The Jersey Shore hosts the highest concentration of oceanside boardwalks in the United States.

Famous for its wide beaches, and many boardwalks featuring arcades, amusement parks, and water parks, the Jersey Shore is a popular vacation spot for residents of North Jersey, New York, Maryland, Delaware, Connecticut, and Pennsylvania. Certain shore communities are also popular with visitors from the Canadian province of Quebec. Due to New Jersey's peninsular geography, both sunrise and sunset are visible over water from different points on the Jersey Shore. The coastal waters of the Jersey Shore constitute one of the fastest-warming urban ocean shorelines in the world.

In 2012, Hurricane Sandy devastated much of the northern part of the Jersey Shore, spawning the demolition and rebuilding of entire neighborhoods, with reinvention on a physically and financially elevated, and economically upscale level; this process of gentrification escalated property values and transformed communities on the Jersey Shore into a second home for the New York financial community, akin to the more established Gold Coast and Hamptons on Long Island.

== Notable shore towns ==
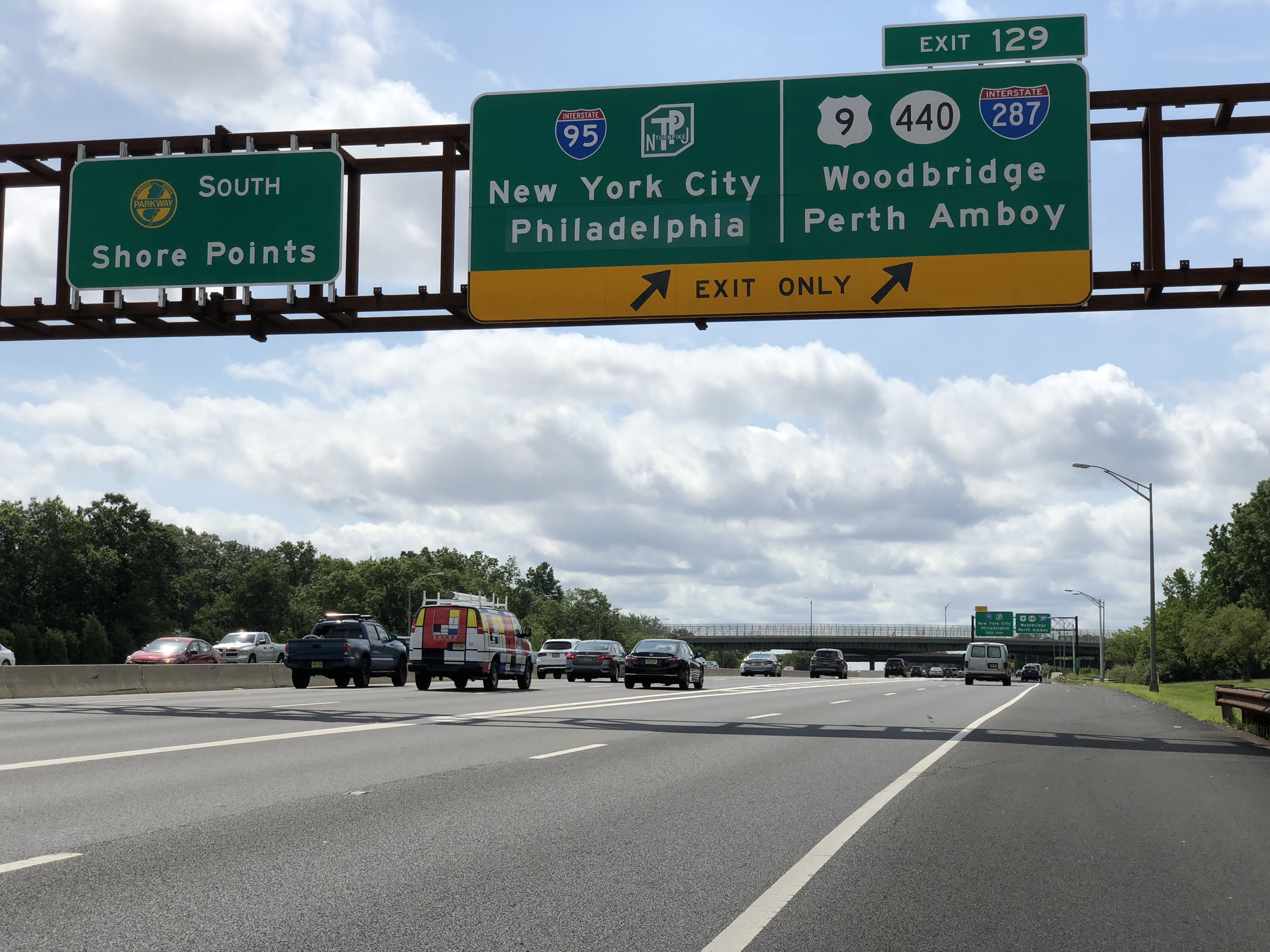
The Garden State Parkway southbound in Fords with "Shore Points" as the control city

The Jersey Shore is lined with over 40 different towns and communities, each with a different character and flavor. Many towns cater extensively to summer tourists, while others are increasingly or completely full-year residential communities. The towns listed below are ordered geographically from north to south.

=== Middlesex County ===
==== The Amboys ====
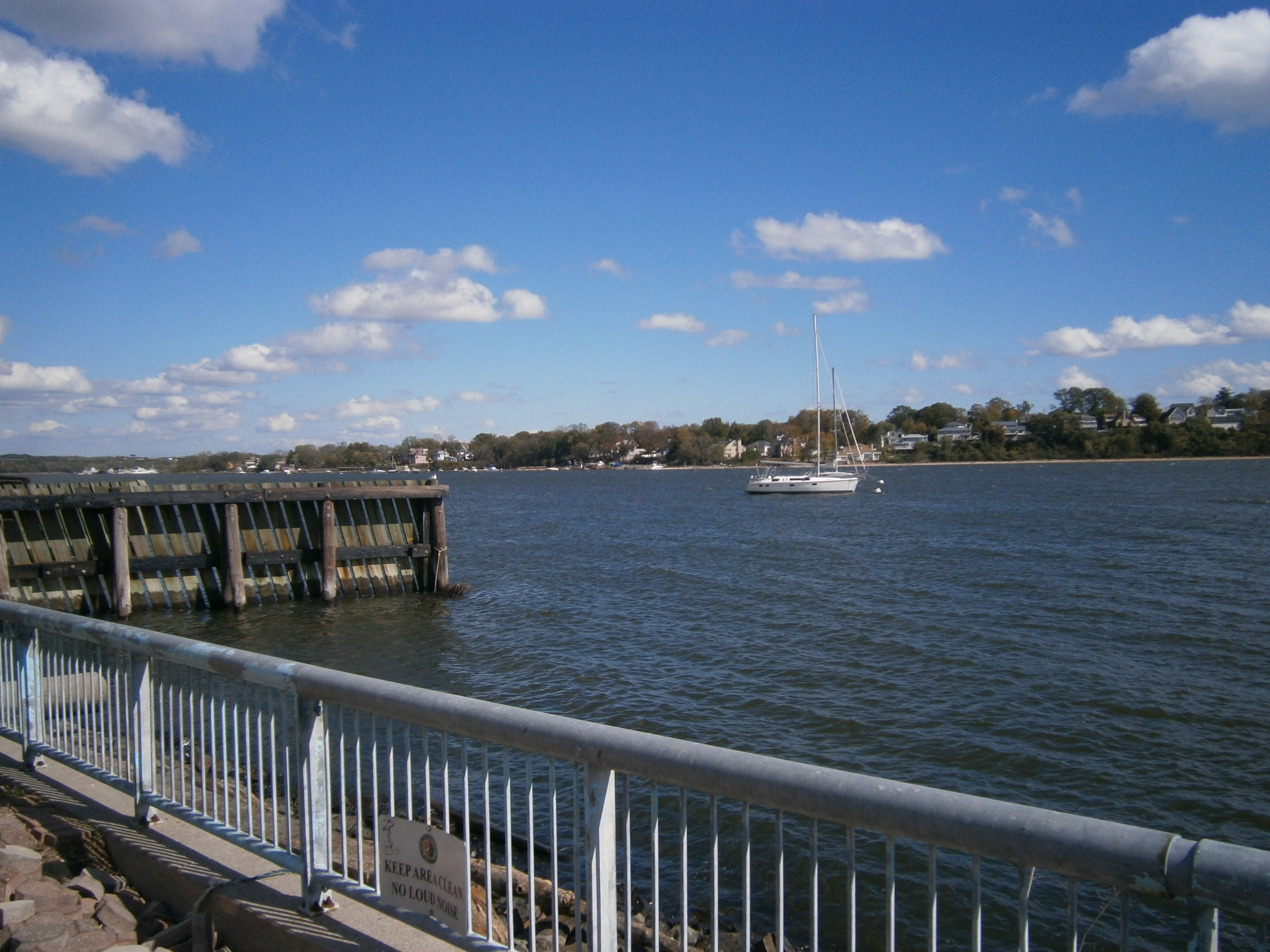
Arthur Kill, a tidal strait along the Perth Amboy waterfront area

Perth Amboy, along with neighboring South Amboy across the Raritan River, make up The Amboys. Perth Amboy was a resort town in the 19th century and early 20th century, located on the northern edge of the Raritan Bayshore. Since the early 1990s Perth Amboy has seen redevelopment. Small businesses have started to open up, helped by the city's designation as an urban enterprise zone. The waterfront has also seen a rebirth, with new parks, a new promenade and an expansion of the marina complementing the old Victorian homes along the bay. Local attractions include the Perth Amboy Ferry Slip and Kearny Cottage. The Raritan Yacht Club, it is one of the oldest yacht clubs in the United States. As of 2023, hundreds of millions of dollars were being invested in the redevelopment of Perth Amboy's waterfront area, in part related to its strategically located industrial area. On October 30, 2023, NY Waterway launched a new ferry service in South Amboy, which connects to Lower and Midtown Manhattan. Both towns are served by the North Jersey Coast Line.

==== Laurence Harbor (Old Bridge) ====
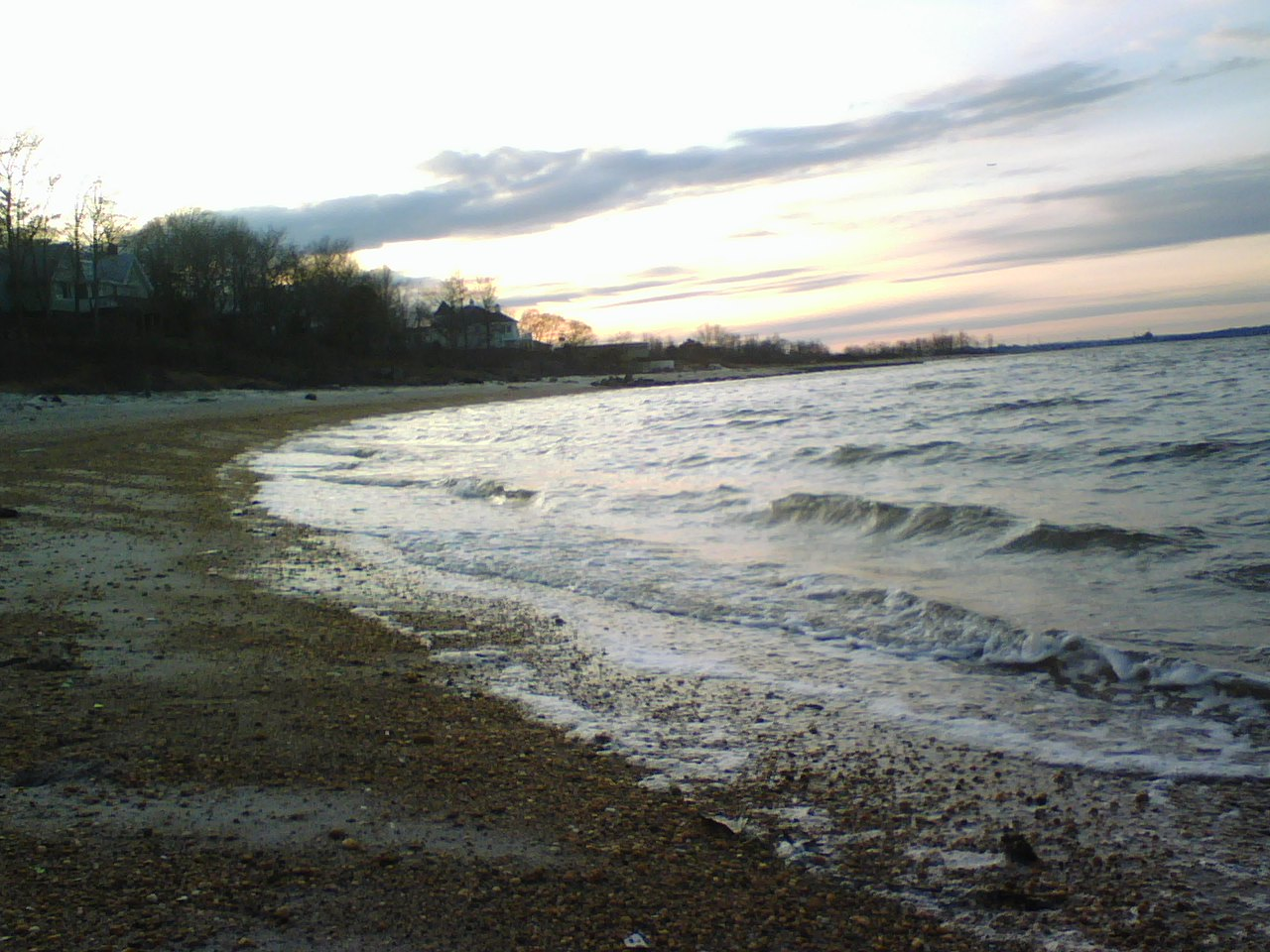
The rocky Raritan Bayshore of Cliffwood Beach, looking northwest towards South Amboy

Laurence Harbor is an unincorporated community located in Old Bridge Township. The waterfront neighborhood looks directly upon many points in New York City, including Staten Island's South Shore; the Verrazzano–Narrows Bridge; Lower Manhattan (and the Empire State Building in Midtown Manhattan on a clear night); and Brooklyn. The NJ Transit Railroad no longer has a station in Laurence Harbor. It had a Morgan station during most of the first half of the 20th century, located right across Cheesequake Creek, sometimes referred to locally as "The Front", from Laurence Harbor, dividing the community into eastern and western sections. Cliffwood Beach also borders Laurence Harbor when traveling south. Morgan is named after the 1703 family that had 645 acres (261 ha) here and were cousins of the infamous pirate captain Henry Morgan. Morgan is located one mile to the northwest, across the Cheesequake Creek and the Morgan Bridge on Route 35. The Morgan Draw carries the North Jersey Coast Line.

Laurence Harbor is home to Old Bridge Waterfront Park, which consists of a new boardwalk (the old boardwalk was destroyed in the 1940–1950s) that was completed in 2002. The beachfront was redone through a joint venture by Old Bridge, New Jersey, and Middlesex County Parks Department. It extends approximately 1 mile (1.6 km) from the Old Bridge Police substation south, to the neighborhood of Cliffwood Beach, running parallel with Route 35. This area is very popular for fishing as three jetties extend into Raritan Bay and are in excellent condition, have been consistent well-maintained. The park's boardwalk is also popular for jogging and dog walking. At the northern parking lot of the park, there is bay beach swimming access along with a bathroom and showers.

=== Monmouth County ===
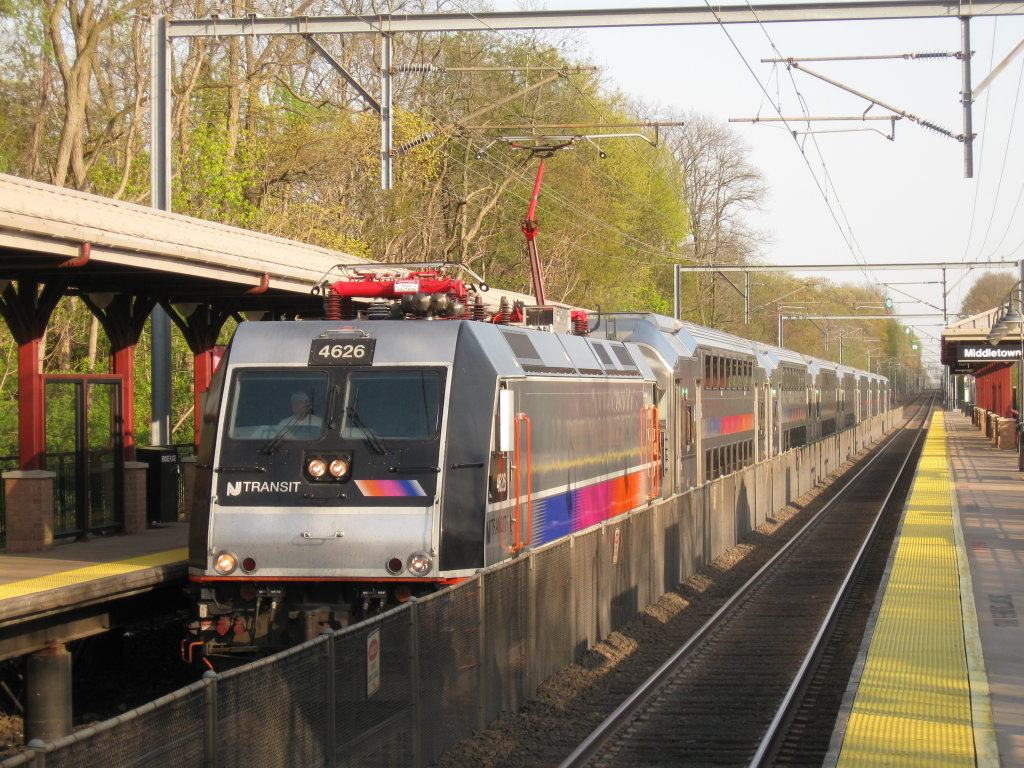
A train approaches Middletown station in Middletown

==== Union Beach ====
Union Beach is a borough situated on the North Shore of Monmouth County, on Raritan Bay. Union Beach is part of the Bayshore Regional Strategic Plan, an effort by nine municipalities in northern Monmouth County to reinvigorate the area's economy by emphasizing the traditional downtowns, dense residential neighborhoods, maritime history, and the natural beauty of the Raritan Bayshore coastline.

==== Keansburg ====
Keansburg was a popular early 20th century summertime destination for tourists from New York City, who would cross the Raritan Bay on steamboats to escape the city heat. Hurricane Donna wiped out much of the waterfront area in 1960, and a number of fires in the 1980s destroyed many of the town's main attractions, including the Dance Hall Auditorium, the Keansburg Bowling Alley, and the Casino Theater.

The Keansburg Amusement Park, founded in 1904, started a massive expansion project in 1995. Upgrades were made to the park and an adjacent water park, Runaway Rapids, was constructed.

==== Atlantic Highlands ====
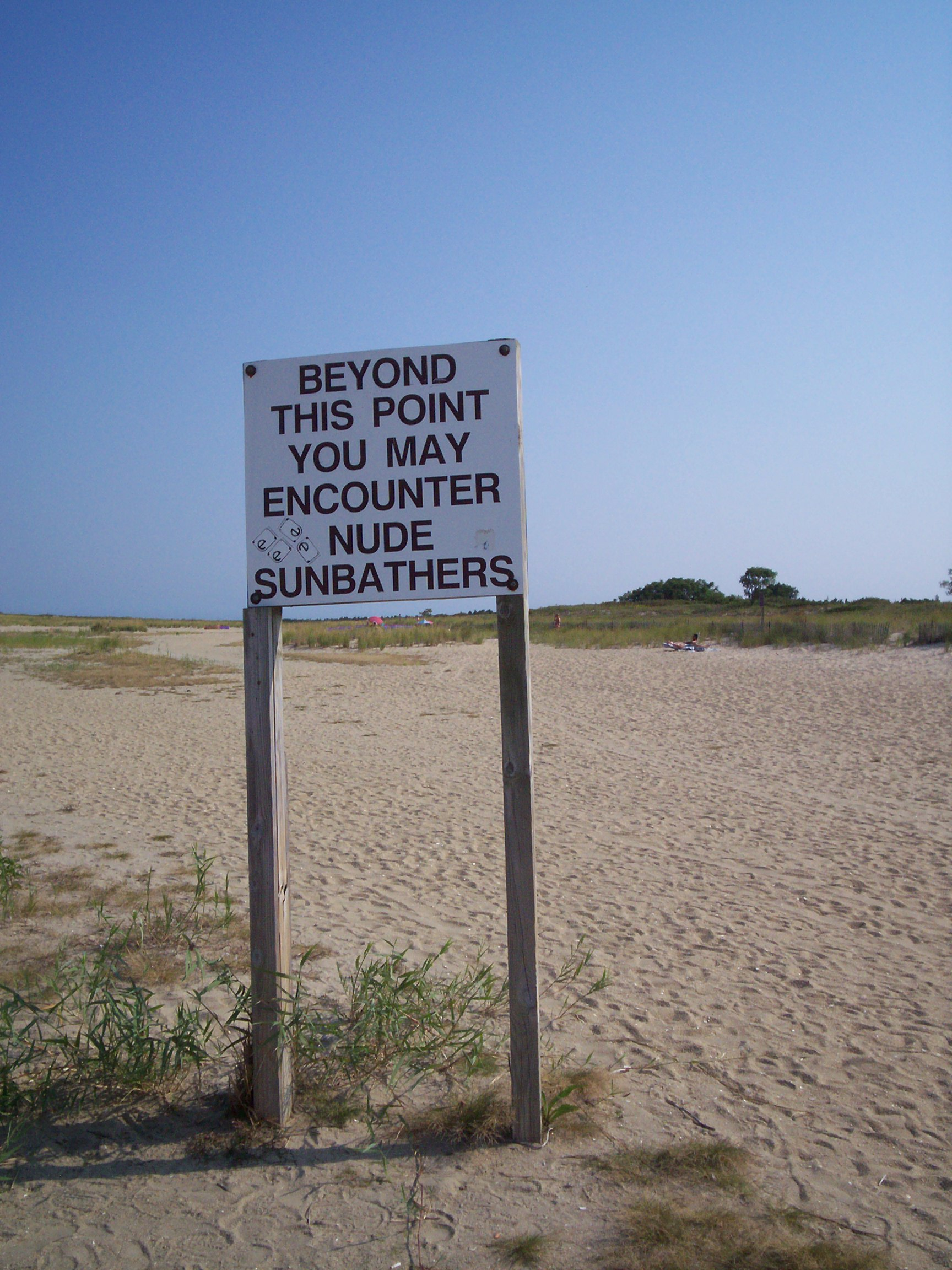
A nude beach sign for Gunnison Beach in Sandy Hook

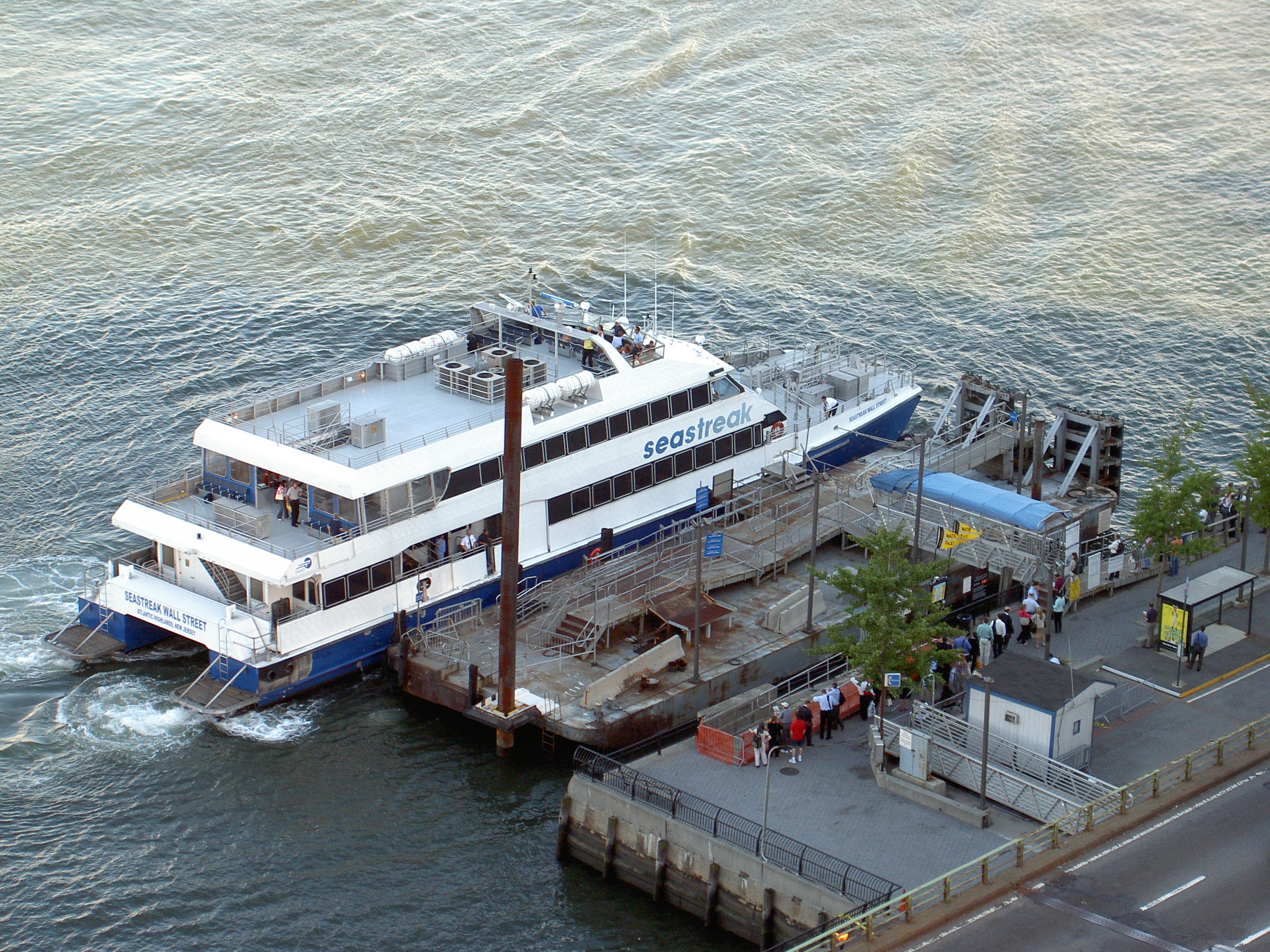
SeaStreak crosses Raritan Bay, connecting Atlantic Highlands with East 34th Street Ferry Landing in Midtown Manhattan

Atlantic Highlands, which overlooks where the Atlantic Ocean and Raritan Bay meet at Sandy Hook, contains Mount Mitchill, the highest point on the eastern seaboard south of Maine, rising 266 feet (81 m) above sea level.

The Manhattan skyline can be seen from the borough's ridges and its shoreline. Pleasure, fishing, and commuter boats sail from its municipal harbor, which was built from 1938 through 1940.

===== Seastreak ferry =====
Atlantic Highlands is home to the high-speed Seastreak ferry service to New York City, which was introduced in 1986. SeaStreak ferry provides high-speed commuter service for residents on the Raritan Bayshore in northern Monmouth County to Manhattan. The ferry also offers seasonal sightseeing excursions. Many Jersey Shore residents board the ferry to travel to different points across the Tri-State area and New England coastline. Many New York residents board the ferry to travel to Atlantic Highlands and Sandy Hook Beach, along with the rest of the Jersey Shore region at large.

==== Sandy Hook (Middletown) ====
Sandy Hook is a long, narrow largely undeveloped barrier spit, most of which is owned and managed by the National Park Service as a unit of the Gateway National Recreation Area. The eastern, ocean-facing shoreline consists of various public and fishing beaches and serves as a Shore gateway and popular destination for recreation in summer when seasonal SeaStreak ferries bring beachgoers. Sandy Hook's Gunnison Beach is one of the largest clothing-optional beaches on the East Coast. The northern end of the peninsula is home to the Sandy Hook Lighthouse, the Marine Academy of Science and Technology, and the restored buildings of Fort Hancock, a former United States Army base. Spread across Sandy Hook are former military installations, including four ammunition bunkers, two gun stations, and a Nike Missile Base.

==== Red Bank ====
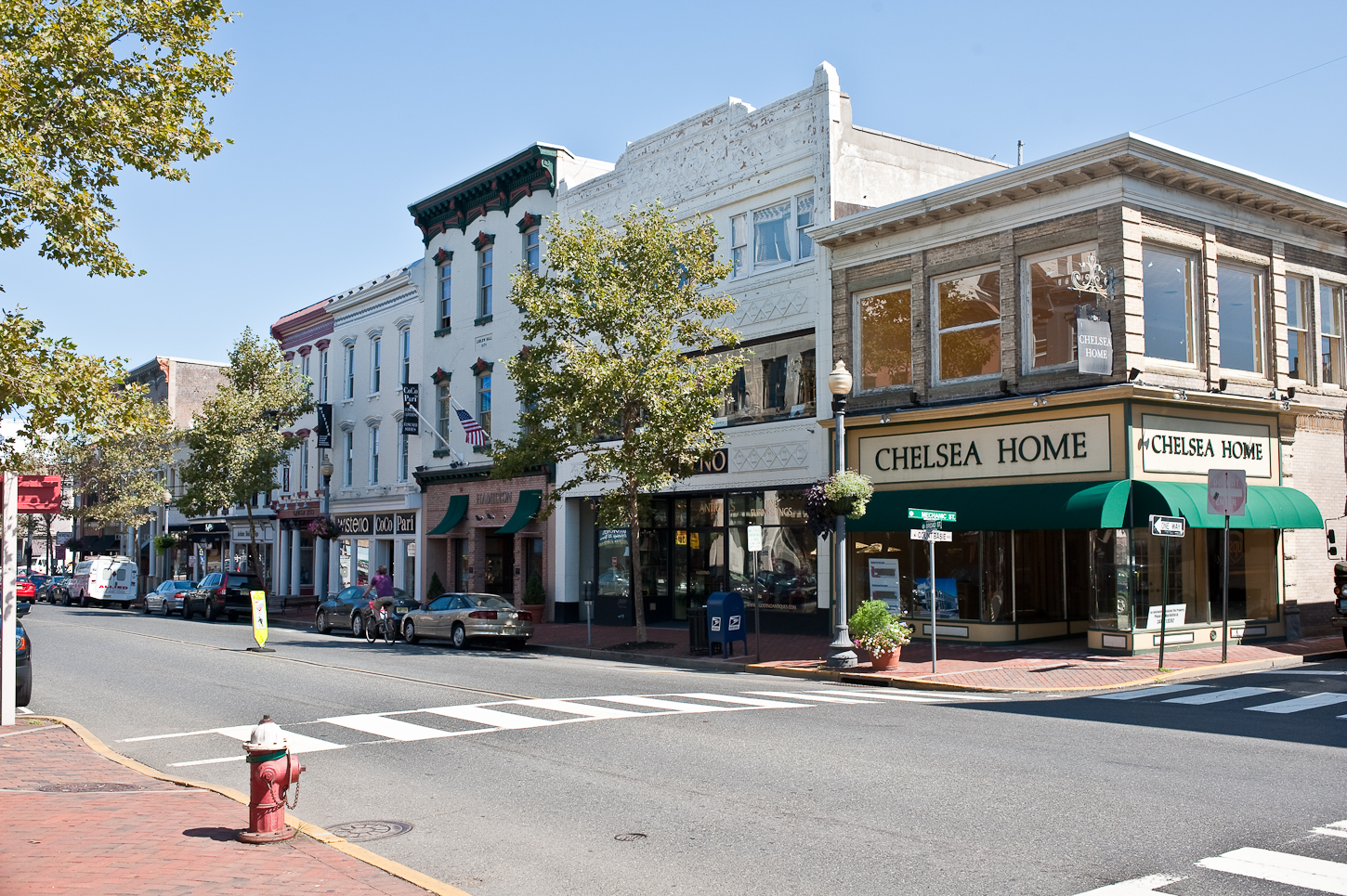
Downtown Red Bank

Red Bank, overlooking the Navesink River, is a noted social and commercial destination, filled with boutiques, designer clothing stores, parks, and restaurants. The town is also considered a center of artistic activity and is home to the Monmouth County Arts Council, as well as the Count Basie Theatre, Two River Theater, and several art galleries. Various festivals held by the town, including the Red Bank Jazz & Blues Festival, draw tourists throughout the year.

Boating, sculling, sailing, and fishing are popular outdoor activities in Red Bank; in the winter, ice boats sail on the Navesink when it freezes over. The Monmouth Boat Club, Marine Park, and the slips of the Molly Pitcher Inn provide access to the river and, from there, the Atlantic Ocean.

==== Oceanport ====
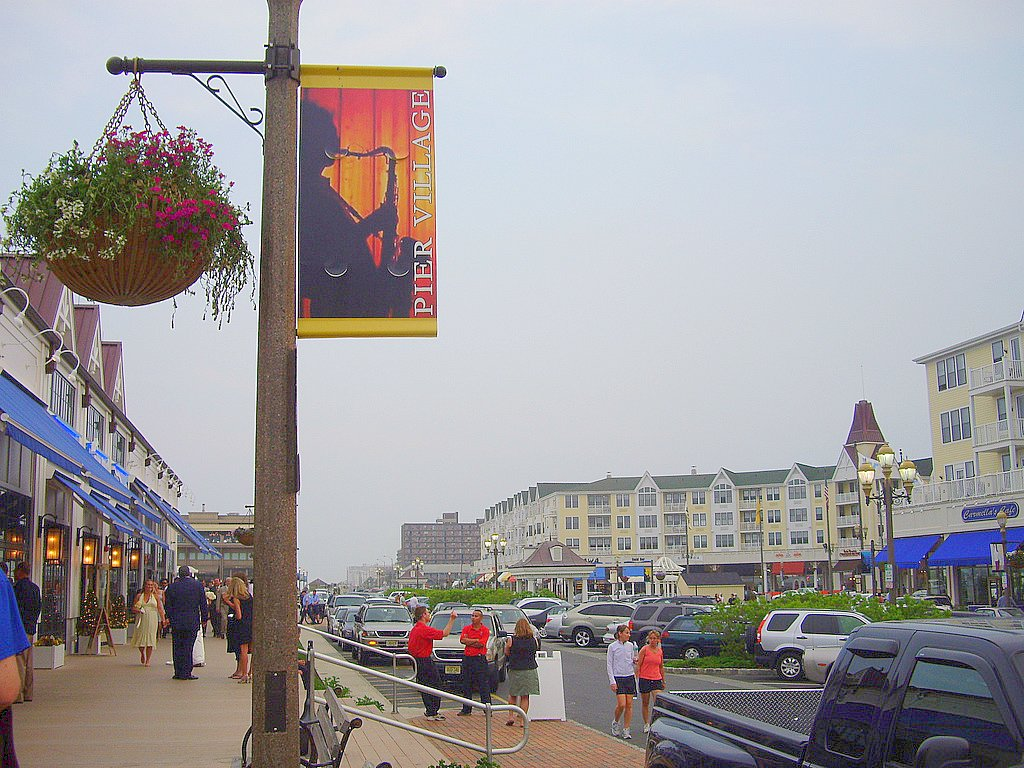
Pier Village along the Long Branch oceanfront

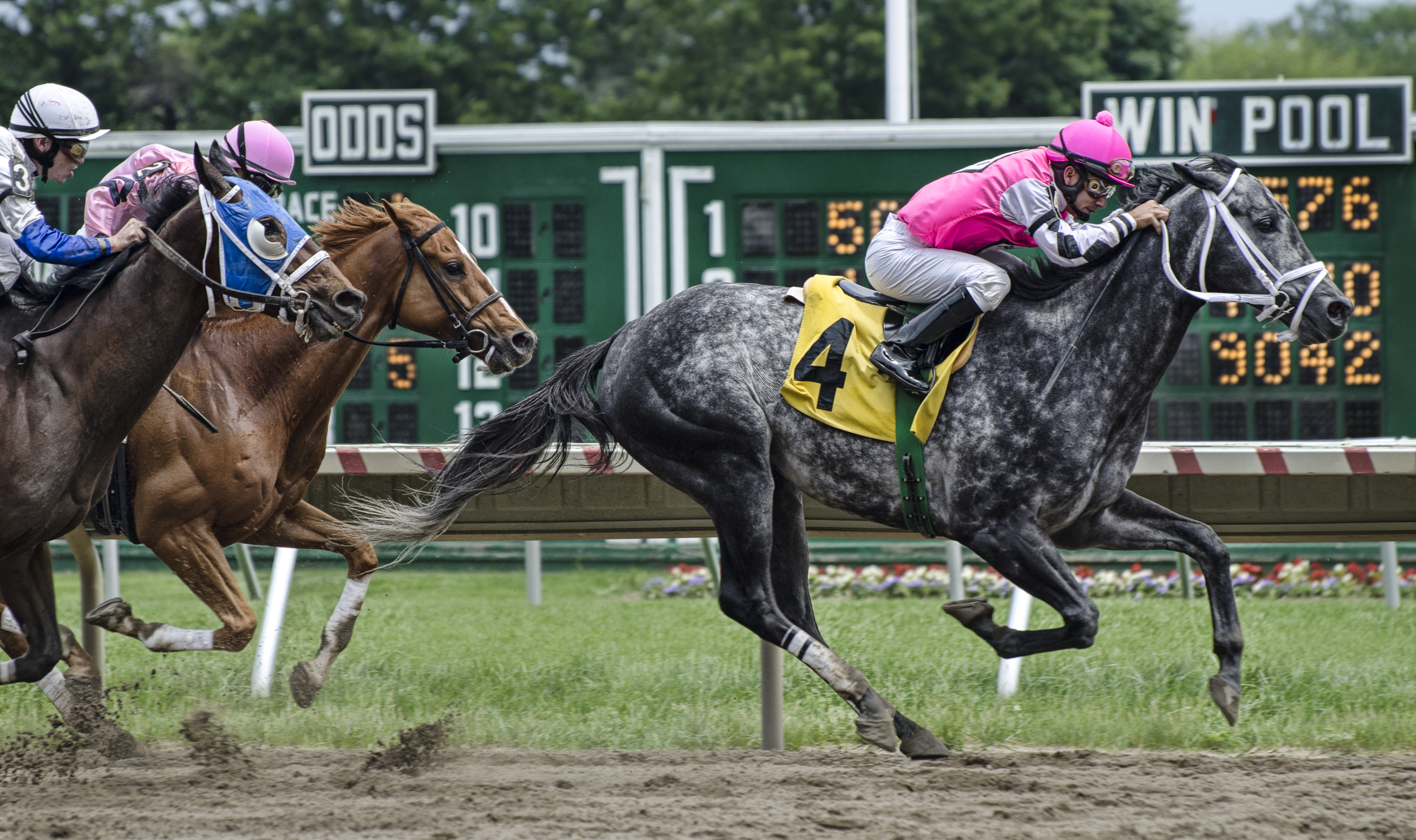
Monmouth Park Racetrack in Oceanport

Oceanport is an upper-middle-class bedroom community located on the Shrewsbury River, between Red Bank and Long Branch. It is the home of Monmouth Park Racetrack, one of the oldest thoroughbred racing tracks in the country.

The original racing track was opened by the Monmouth Park Association on July 30, 1870, in nearby Eatontown to increase summer tourism for communities along the Shore. Monmouth Park early on earned the nickname as the "Newmarket of America" due to the excellence of its racing. However, after three years of being open financial issues caused the track to close. In 1878, the track was bought by David D. Withers, George L. Lorillard, James Gordon Bennett, Jr., and George P. Wetmore. The men spent four years renovating the grounds and grandstand and reopened Monmouth Park in 1882. From 1882 to 1890, the track increased in popularity and as a result, a new racetrack was constructed next to the original. The new racetrack opened in 1890 becoming the second Monmouth Park. However, legislation proposed in 1891 and enacted in 1894 barred parimutuel betting in New Jersey, and the track closed its doors. It was not until 1946 when the New Jersey Legislature passed a bill providing for state regulation of horse racing that the current Monmouth Park opened.

Its location on the shore and as a stop on the North Jersey Coast Line makes it a popular shore destination for residents from New York and North Jersey to see thoroughbred racing. The Haskell Invitational Stakes take place annually in August.

==== Long Branch ====
Long Branch developed into a resort town in the late 18th century, with oceanside hotels, large estates, and grand theaters. It was visited by seven United States presidents, including Ulysses S. Grant, Chester A. Arthur, Rutherford B. Hayes, James A. Garfield, Benjamin Harrison, William McKinley, Donald Trump and Woodrow Wilson. All seven worshiped at the Church of the Presidents in the city, and beachside Seven Presidents Park is named for their visits. Long Branch's popularity waned in the years following World War II, with the opening of the Garden State Parkway in the mid-1950s allowing tourists to access points further south. The defining moment marking the end of this era occurred on June 8, 1987, when a large fire destroyed the town's pier and adjoining amusement park.

In 2005, Pier Village, a Victorian-inspired mixed-use community consisting of rental residences atop retail space, opened. A public grassy area called Festival Plaza is the site of regular events, including concerts, arts & crafts fairs, outdoor movies, and holiday events. Long Branch is also home to Max's Famous Hotdogs and its rival, the original WindMill Hot Dogs, located in a windmill-shaped building since 1963.

==== Allenhurst ====
The borough of Allenhurst is best known for its shoreline Residential Historic District, roughly bounded by the Atlantic Ocean, Main Street, Cedar Avenue, Hume Street, and Elberon Avenue. The district was added to the National Register of Historic Places on June 18, 2010, for its historical architectural significance. It includes 412 contributing buildings.

==== Asbury Park ====
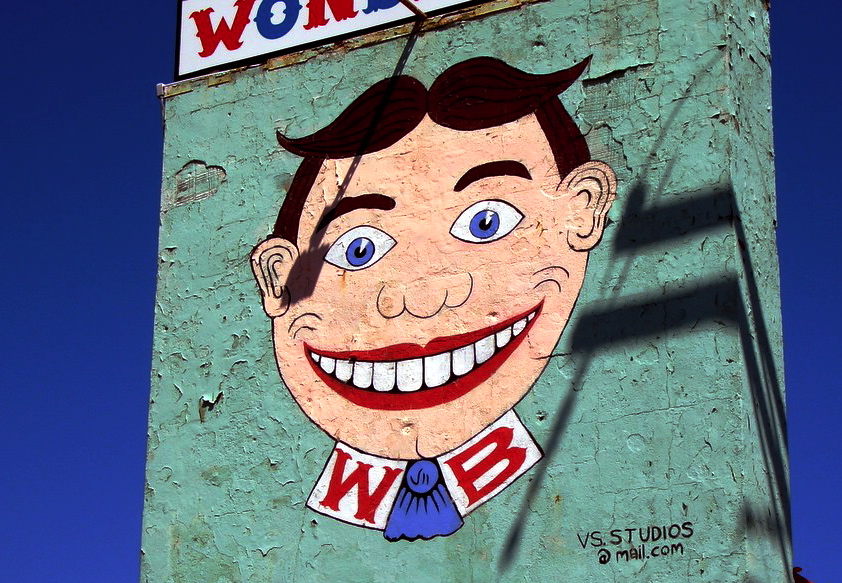
A Tillie replica on the Wonder Bar in Asbury Park

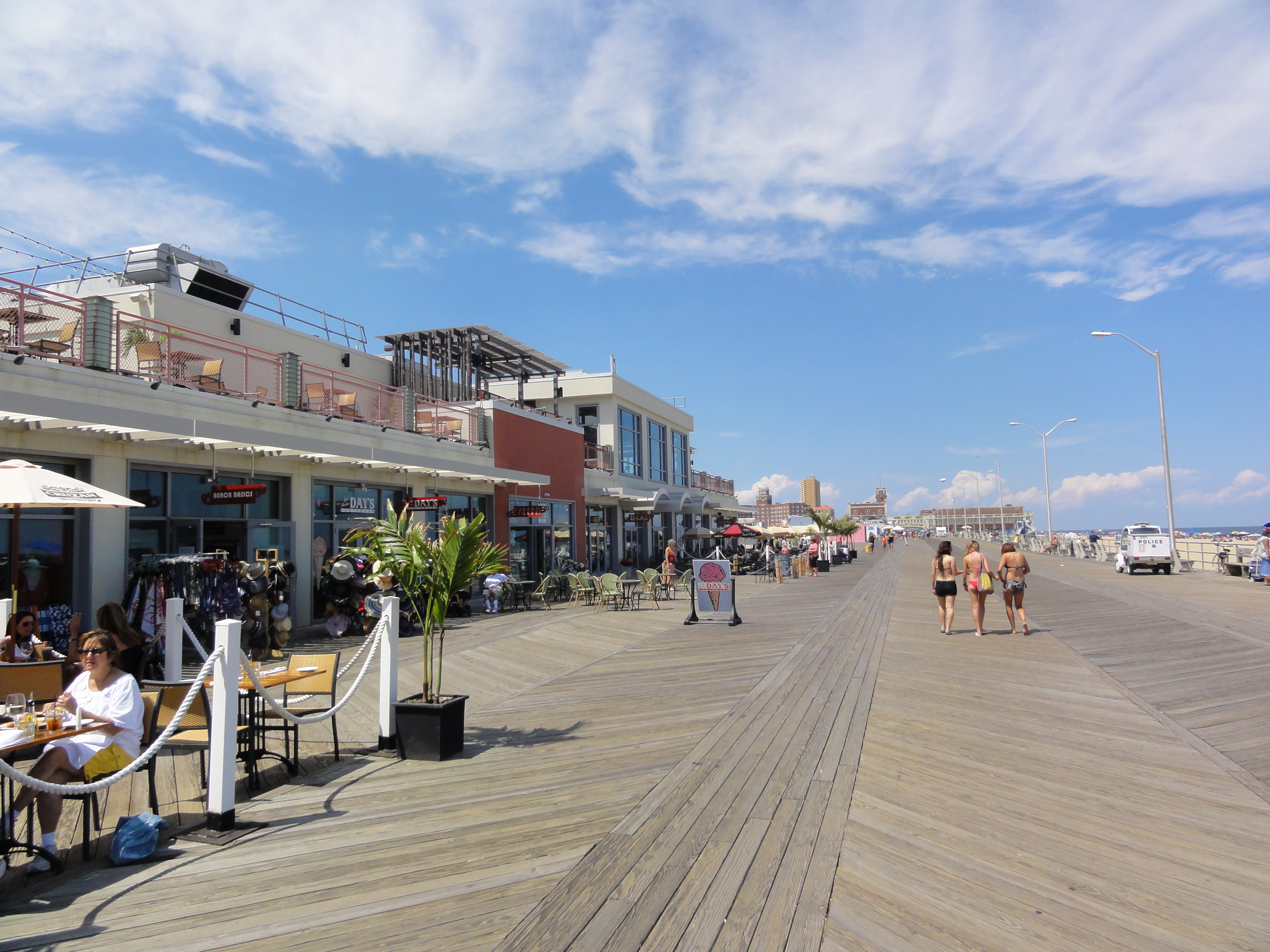
Asbury Park's boardwalk

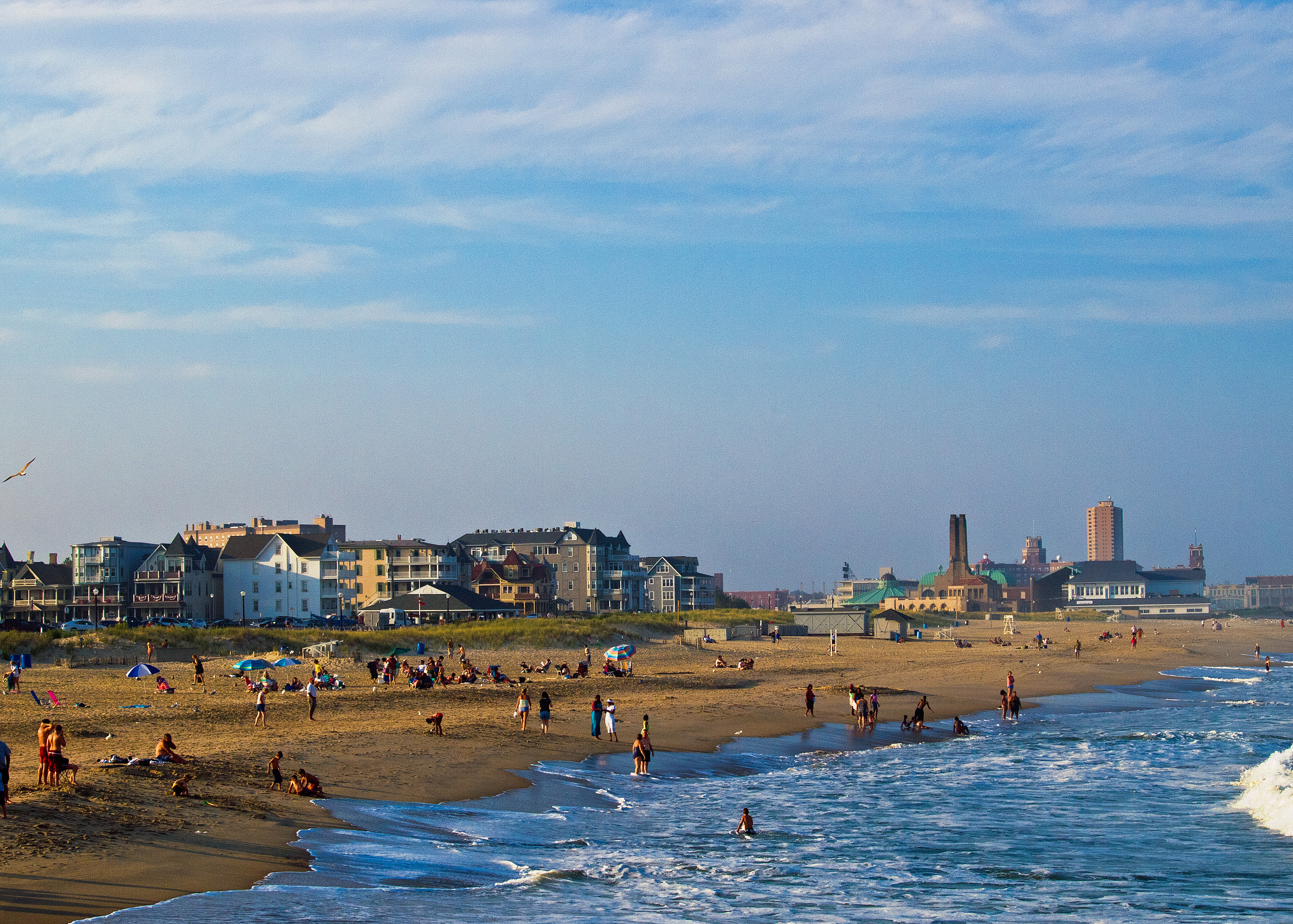
The Jersey Shore in Ocean Grove, with the Asbury Park skyline in the background

Asbury Park developed through the 1920s and 1930s as a resort destination for the New York metro area, and it remained that way through World War II. The Paramount Theatre and Asbury Park Convention Hall, both connected to the boardwalk via a grand arcade, drew considerable tourists. The post-war era of the 1950s and 1960s saw the construction of the Garden State Parkway and the Monmouth Mall, taking visitors away from Asbury Park and its shopping areas. At the same time, the city's music scene gained prominence with artists like Bruce Springsteen & the E Street Band and Southside Johnny and the Asbury Jukes getting their starts at venues like Asbury Lanes and The Stone Pony, the latter one of New Jersey's best-known music venues. These acts and others led to the development of a sub-genre of rock and roll known as the Jersey Shore sound.

Race riots on July 4, 1970, resulted in the destruction of various buildings across the city. A popular indoor amusement complex, Palace Amusements, was closed in 1988 and demolished in 2004, despite multiple attempts to save it. A pair of large murals on the building's side known collectively as "Tillie" became an icon of the Jersey Shore and was saved.

In the 1990s, Asbury Park emerged as a prime LGBT destination, with multiple gay bars and nightclubs, as well as the Empress Hotel, the state's first gay-oriented hotel, opening. Since the early 2000s, a burgeoning crowd of artists along with local political leaders have helped push the town through major redevelopment, which is still ongoing. Asbury Park still retains the lively music scene which made it famous. Events like the Asbury Music Awards and the Garden State Film Festival continue to draw tourists to the city.

==== Ocean Grove (Neptune) ====
Ocean Grove was originally developed in 1869 as a Methodist summer camp meeting site. Today, it is an unincorporated community located within Neptune Township and is listed on the National Register of Historic Places. Ocean Grove is noted for its abundant examples of Victorian architecture. It is home to The Great Auditorium, a 6,250-seat indoor arena constructed out of wood in 1894 on bridge-like iron trusses laid on stone foundations. The Auditorium contains a pipe organ that is one of the 20 largest in the world. Surrounding the Auditorium are 114 tents, which are occupied from May to September, just as they have been since the town's founding. The tents adjoin to rear sheds containing a kitchen and bathroom and are stored in the sheds during the winter. They are in such demand that there is a waiting list of ten years for summer rentals. Ocean Grove was named one of the top 15 best beaches by Fodor's in 2014.

==== Belmar ====
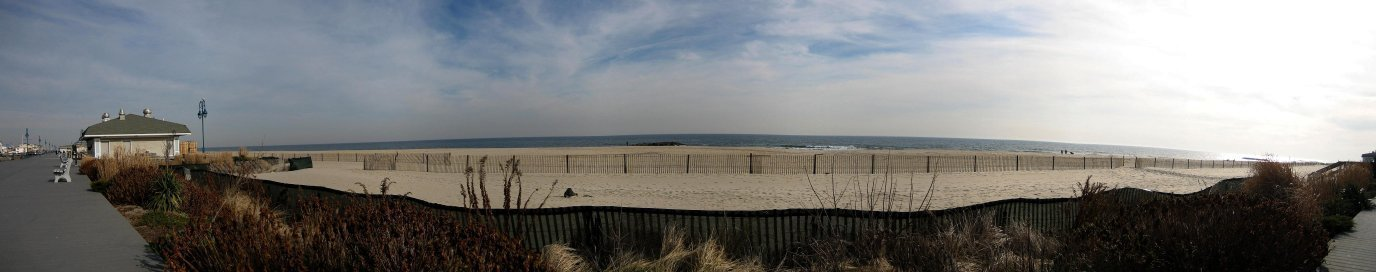
Panoramic view of Belmar beach and boardwalk

Belmar is a popular vacation destination due to its natural and recreational resources. Its boardwalk and town offer shops, restaurants, an active arts scene, sporting events, festivals, and a variety of family-oriented activities. Belmar is also a popular party town for young adults and college students. Belmar is among the most popular surf spots on the East Coast, frequently hosting surfing events and competitions.

==== Spring Lake ====
Spring Lake is easily recognized by its tree lined streets, stately mansions, and seasonal cottages (of which few remain). During the Gilded Age of the late 19th and early 20th centuries, prominent members of New York City and Philadelphia high society purchased a large tract of farmland with the vision of creating a resort and religious retreat area catering to the wealthy- similar in fashion to the communities of Newport, Rhode Island, and Bar Harbor, Maine. Grand hotels and guest cottages were constructed to accommodate an anticipated influx well-to-do seasonal visitors. Notably, in 1900 many of the largest hotels were destroyed by fire, leaving way for wealthy families to construct houses for year-round living. But to this day, few original structures remain; as it is now commonplace to raise lots and demolish structures in order to make way for the largest homes possible. Of those still in existence, the Martin Maloney Cottage and the Audenried Cottage serve as examples of what now remains.

==== Manasquan ====
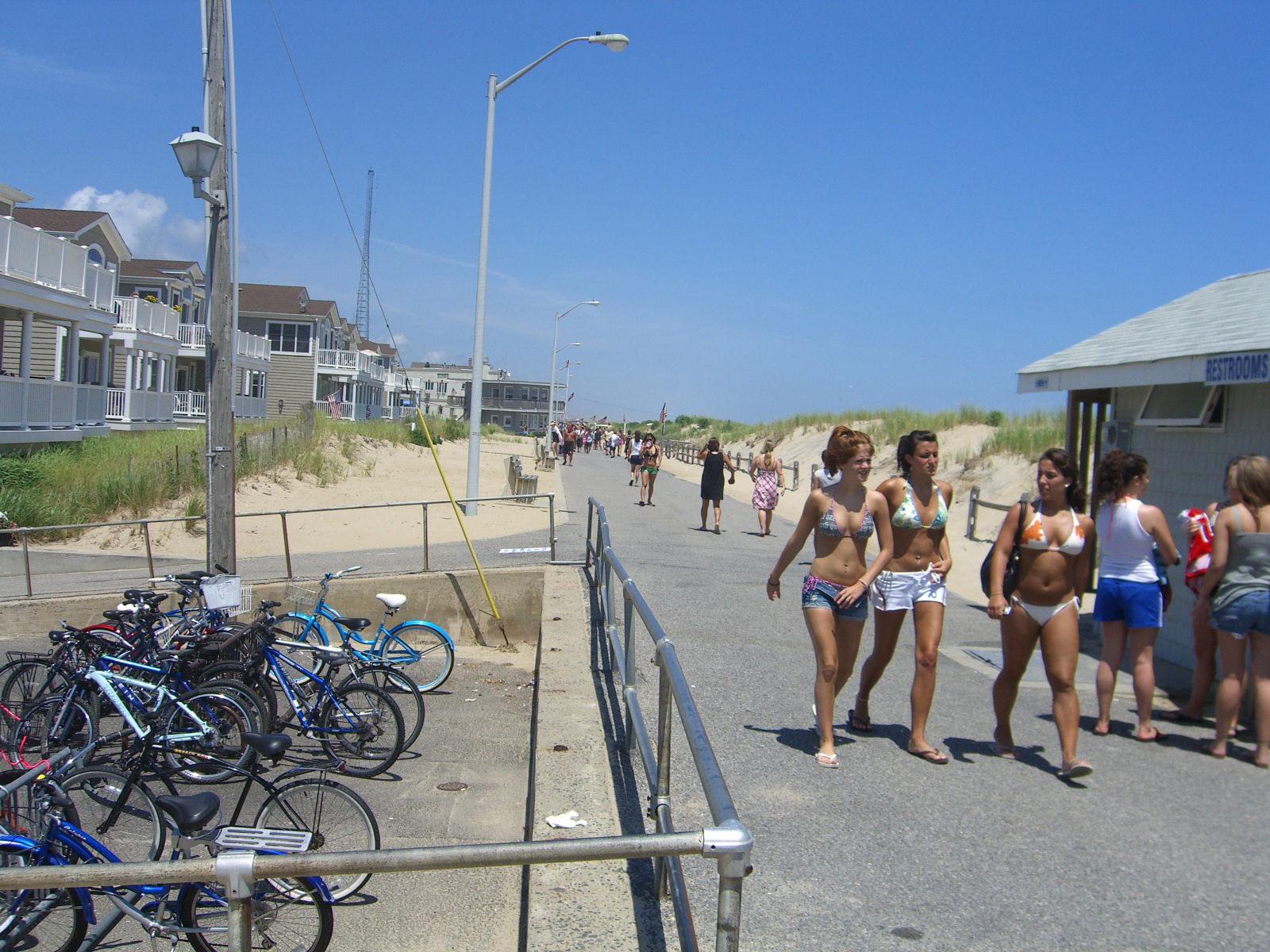
The boardwalk in Manasquan

Manasquan has an active downtown area defined by its Main Street, lined with small businesses and original Victorian houses. It is home to a historic 540-seat theatre, named after the Native American tribe that inhabited the land before European settlement. Built in 1938 as a movie house, it converted during May 1994 to a professional theatre. Over the course of the 20th century, much of the traditional neighborhood beach bungalows were demolished and replaced with dwellings to accommodate larger single families, helping turn Manasquan into a predominately year-round residential community, easing the focus on summer tourism.

The Manasquan Inlet is the northern terminus of the inland portion of the Intracoastal Waterway. It provides surfers with waves that are corralled, refracted, and enlarged by the jetty protruding out into the Atlantic Ocean.

=== Ocean County ===
==== Point Pleasant Beach ====
Point Pleasant Beach is situated on the Barnegat Peninsula, a long, narrow barrier peninsula that divides the Barnegat Bay from the Atlantic Ocean at the Manasquan Inlet, and the borough derives its name from this location. The town's boardwalk is approximately one mile long, and its central third is home to Jenkinsons' amusement park, aquarium, and arcades, as well as numerous pizza restaurants, ice cream parlors, games-of-chance, and miniature golf courses. Point Pleasant is home to the first Jersey Mike's sub shop, founded in the town in 1956.

==== Seaside Heights ====
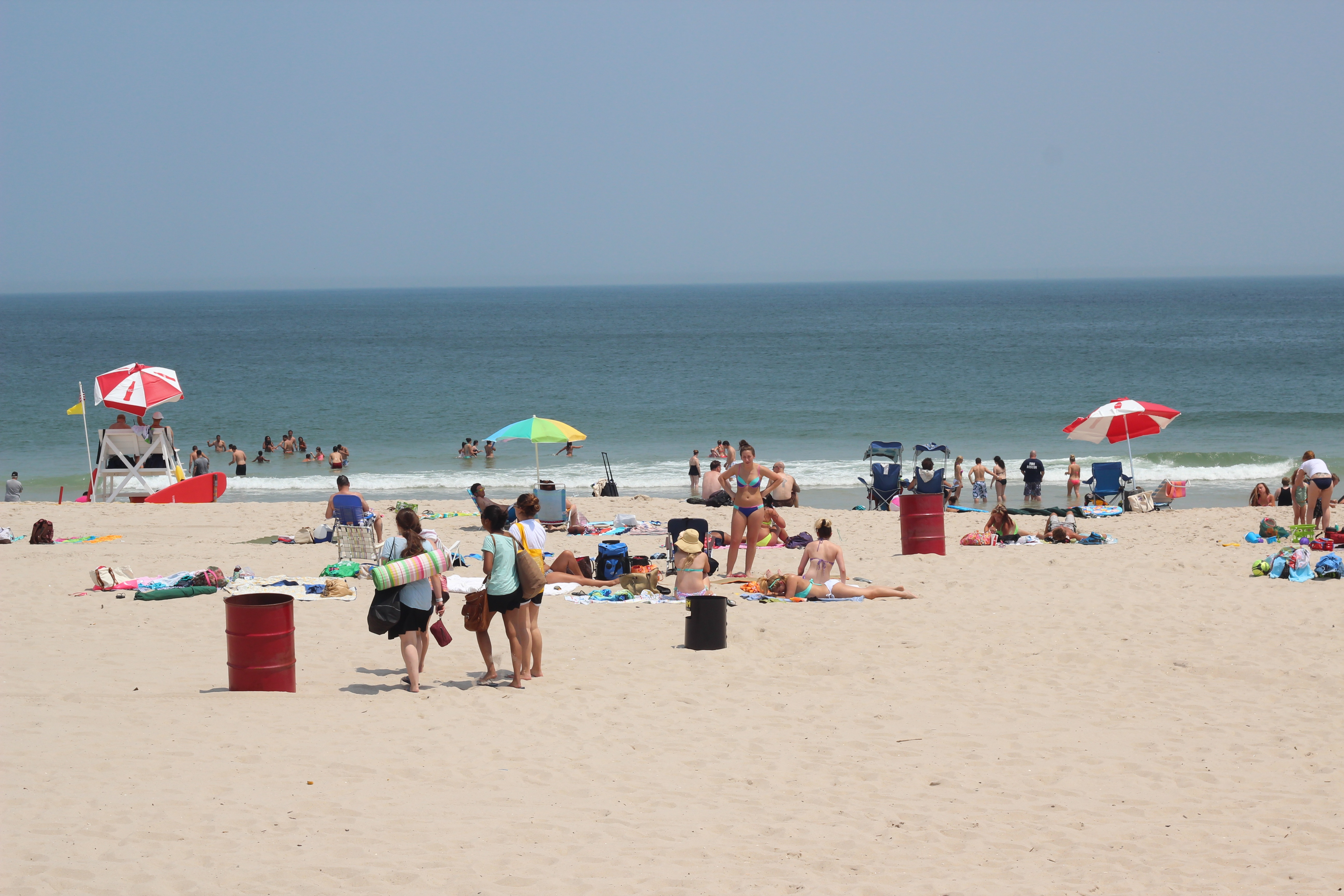
The beach in Seaside Heights

Seaside Heights is a resort community, with a beach, an amusement-oriented boardwalk, and numerous clubs and bars making it a popular destination. During the summer, the borough attracts a crowd largely over the age of 21, drawn to a community with boardwalk entertainment and one of the few shore communities with sizable numbers of apartments. In the peak months of July and August, the town's population explodes from around 3,000 residents to between 30,000 and 65,000 people on any given day. South of the town sits Island Beach State Park, the largest reserve of an undeveloped barrier island in New Jersey and one of the largest in the United States.

Casino Pier is an amusement park situated on a pier extending over the Atlantic Ocean. The pier offers many family-friendly attractions and roller coasters, as well as an arcade, games-of-chance, and a rooftop miniature golf course. Across the street, a go-kart track, a new miniature golf course, and a waterpark, Breakwater Beach, round out the attraction list. The rest of the 2-mile (3.2 km) long boardwalk offers various arcades, attractions, souvenir shops, restaurants and food stands.

On October 29, 2012, substantial portions of the boardwalk were damaged and much of the borough was flooded as a result of Hurricane Sandy. Both Casino Pier and Funtown Pier suffered major damage, with sections of both piers torn apart by a powerful storm surge that caused many rides to collapse into the ocean. One such ride, Casino Pier's Star Jet, became a symbol of the storm's destruction as it sat upright in the Atlantic Ocean after the pier washed out below it. A portion of the rebuilt boardwalk and all of Funtown Pier were destroyed in a 2013 fire.

The community is also known as the setting of the hit MTV show Jersey Shore, as well as various editions of MTV True Life and MTV Summer Beach House.

==== Long Beach Island ====
Long Beach Island, colloquially known as LBI, is a barrier island and summer colony approximately 18 miles (29 km) in length. The primary industries include tourism, fishing, and real estate. The only access point to the island by car is via the Manahawkin Bay Bridge, locally known as "The Causeway", which carries Route 72 over Manahawkin Bay. Long Beach Island is home to about 20,000 people on a year-round basis. However, the population swells significantly during the summer months and reaches about 100,000 people, including both part-time residents and tourists, who are often referred to as "shoobies". The island's close-knit communities are largely affluent and contain vacation homes for wealthy individuals who reside elsewhere in New Jersey, as well as New York, Pennsylvania, and Connecticut.

The low-density northern end of the Long Beach Island, including the communities of Barnegat Light, Loveladies, Harvey Cedars, and North Beach, are home to an assortment of high-end waterfront vacation homes. The southern end contains significantly more year-round residents and businesses, particularly in the larger boroughs of Beach Haven, Long Beach, and Surf City. Long Beach Island typically attracts a family-oriented crowd during the summertime; the island has not contained a boardwalk since the 1944 hurricane, and nightlife is limited to a few bars. Tourists generally take part in recreational activities like miniature golf, parasailing, jet skiing, and relaxing on the beaches. The island has a reputation as a base for long-range deep-sea fishing and charter boats.

Attractions include the Barnegat Lighthouse, a 165 feet (50 m) tall lighthouse overlooking the Barnegat Inlet, located in a state park at the island's northern tip. A small amusement park, Fantasy Island, serves the surrounding communities, and the original Ron Jon Surf Shop location sits at the foot of the Manahawkin Bay Bridge in Ship Bottom.

=== Atlantic County ===
==== Brigantine ====
Brigantine is an island community, the northernmost in Atlantic County. The Brigantine Lighthouse, constructed to attract tourists, is a central identifying symbol of the city. Brigantine is home to the Marine Mammal Stranding Center, the state's only rescue center for stranded marine mammals and sea turtles. It has rescued more than 3,900 whales, dolphins, seals and sea turtles since it was formed. Part of the Edwin B. Forsythe National Wildlife Refuge is located on the northern end of the island. The town is named after the numerous shipwrecks in the area, many of which were likely brigantines.

==== Atlantic City ====
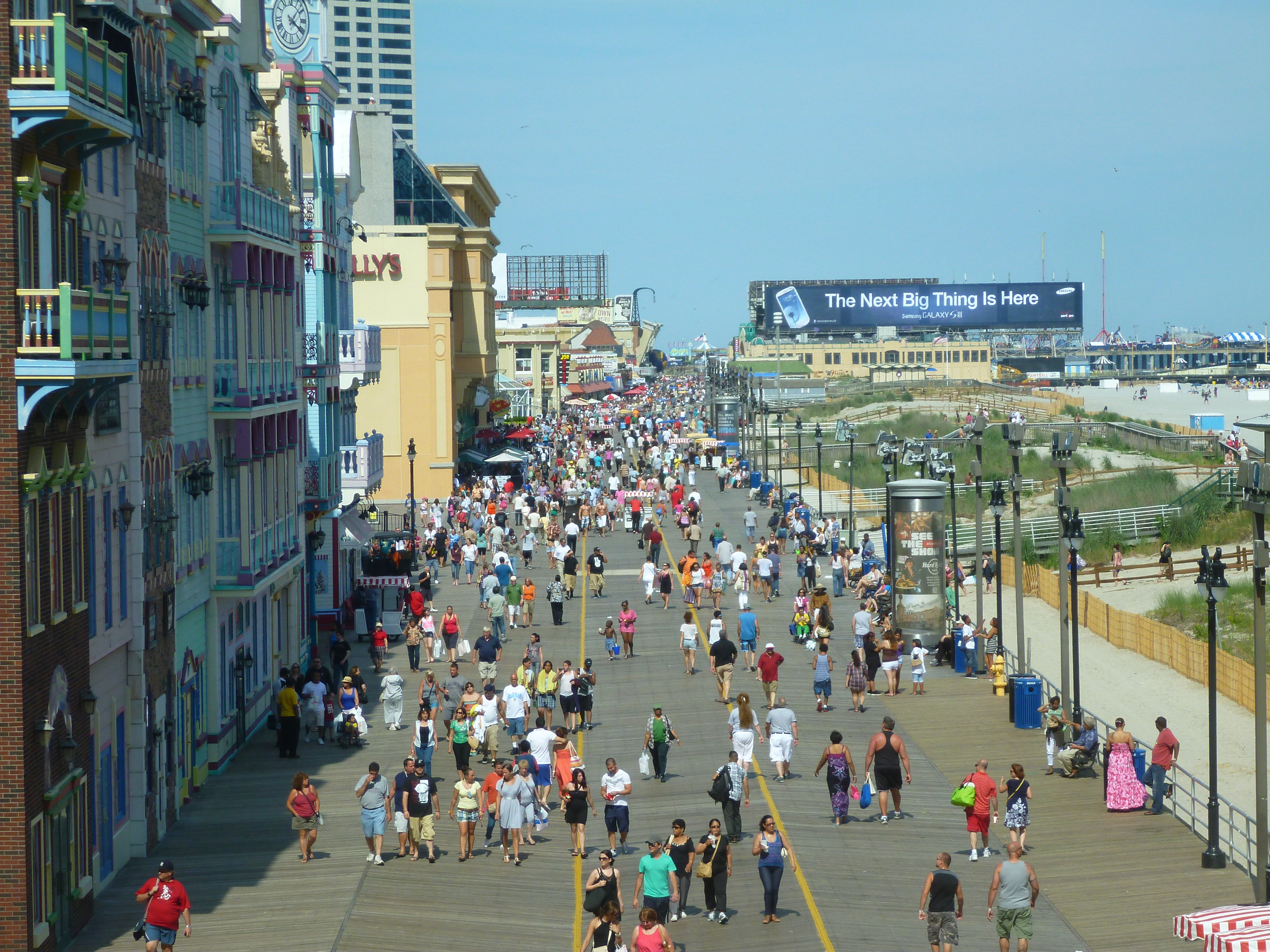
The boardwalk in Atlantic City, the nation's first boardwalk

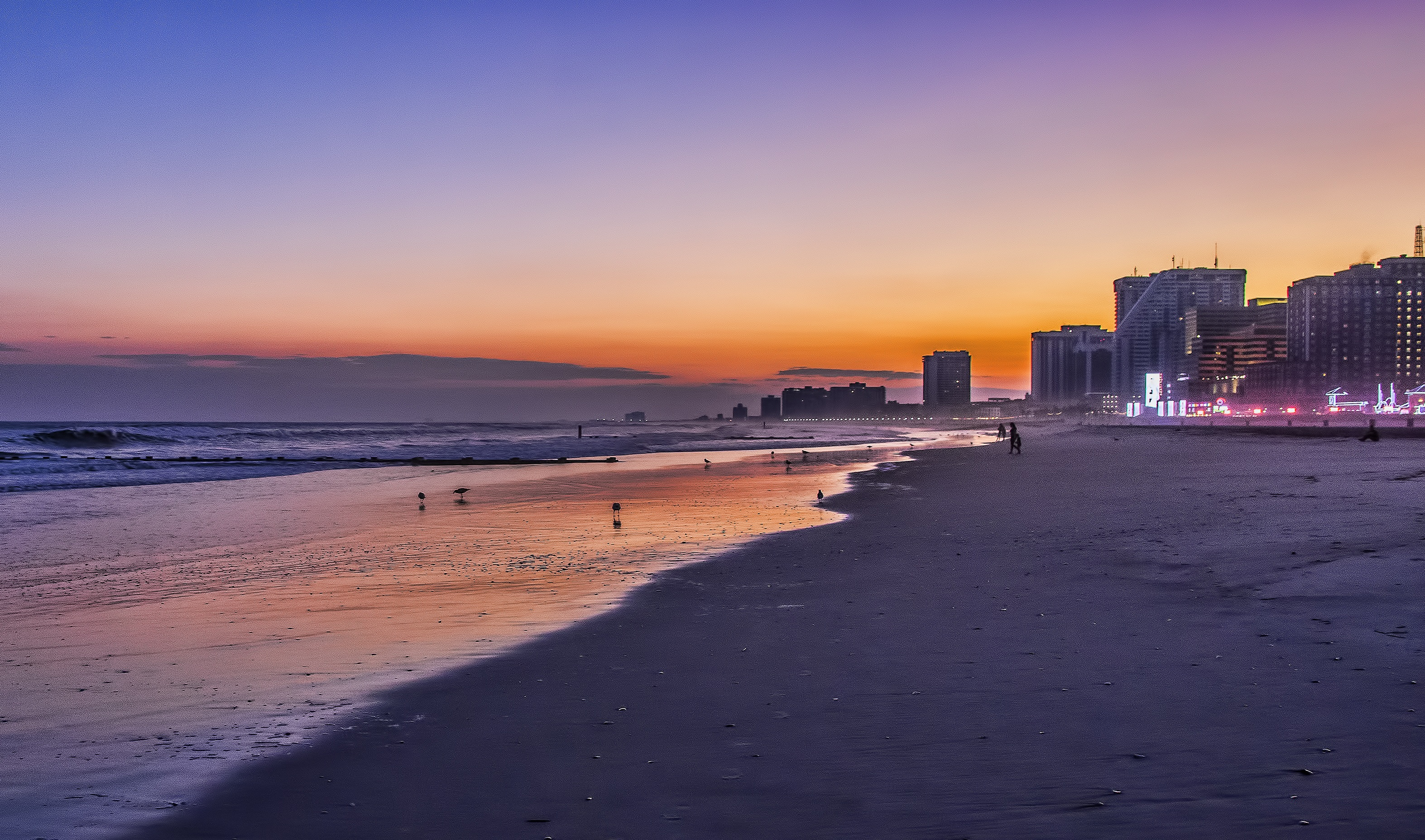
Sunset on the beach in Atlantic City

Atlantic City is a nationally renowned resort city for gambling, shopping and fine dining. In an effort at revitalizing the city, New Jersey voters in 1976 passed a referendum, approving casino gambling for Atlantic City. Today, the city is second to Las Vegas in number of casinos, yearly gaming revenue, and number of casino hotel rooms. Casinos like the Ocean Casino Resort, Borgata, Harrah's, Caesars, and Tropicana draw tourists from around the world.

The Atlantic City Boardwalk is the world's oldest boardwalk, opening on June 26, 1870. At 5 1/2 miles (8.9 km) long, it is also the world's longest and busiest boardwalk. The boardwalk starts at Absecon Inlet and runs along the beach for 4 miles (6 km) to the city limit. An additional 1 1/2 miles (2 km) of the boardwalk extend into neighboring Ventnor City. Casinos and hotels front the boardwalk, as well as stores, restaurants, games, and other attractions.

Events like Thunder over the Boardwalk, as well as more traditional attractions like the Absecon Lighthouse and Lucy the Elephant, bring in additional visitors. Shopping in the city include Playground Pier, Tanger Outlets The Walk, and The Quarter at Tropicana.

Notable landmarks include Boardwalk Hall, an arena and convention center opened in 1929, and Steel Pier, an amusement park on a 1,000 foot (300 m) long pier over the Atlantic Ocean. Home of the Miss America pageant, Atlantic City has been featured in numerous films and television series, most notably as the setting of the 1980 film Atlantic City and the 2011 HBO series Boardwalk Empire. The city also served as the inspiration for the board game Monopoly.

=== Cape May County ===
==== Ocean City ====
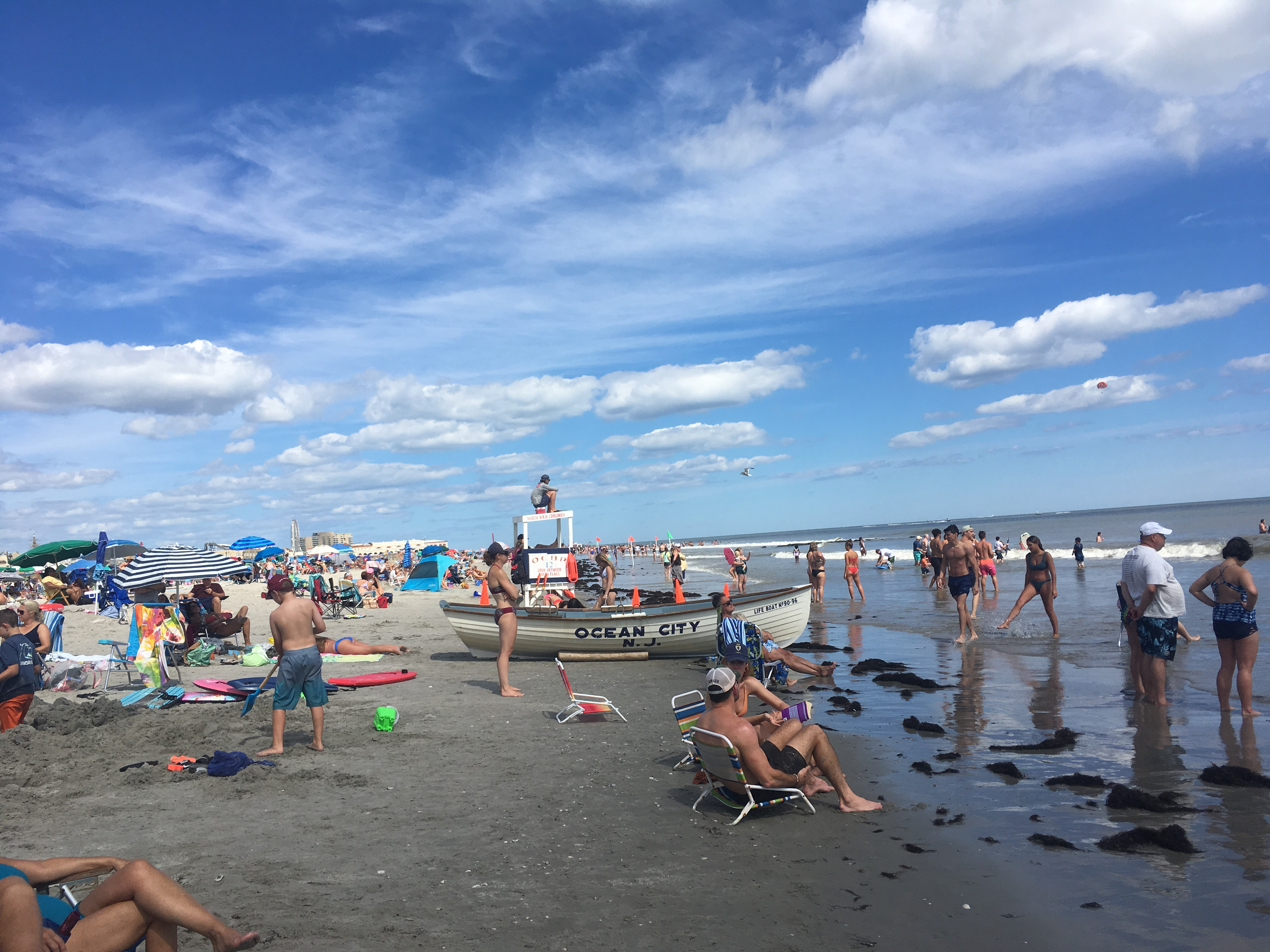
The beach in Ocean City

Ocean City is home to a boardwalk fronted by several shops and amusement areas. Known as a family-oriented seaside resort, the city has prohibited the sale of alcoholic beverages within its limits since its founding in 1879. Ocean City has miles of guarded beaches, a 2.5-mile boardwalk, and a downtown shopping and dining district. Gillian's Wonderland Pier and Playland's Castaway Cove are two large amusement parks located along the boardwalk, with both family and thrill rides. A water park, various arcades, miniature golf courses, and a historic entertainment hall, the Ocean City Music Pier, round out the boardwalk attractions. Corson's Inlet State Park was established by the New Jersey Legislature in 1969 to protect and preserve one of the last undeveloped tracts of land along the state's oceanfront.

==== The Wildwoods ====
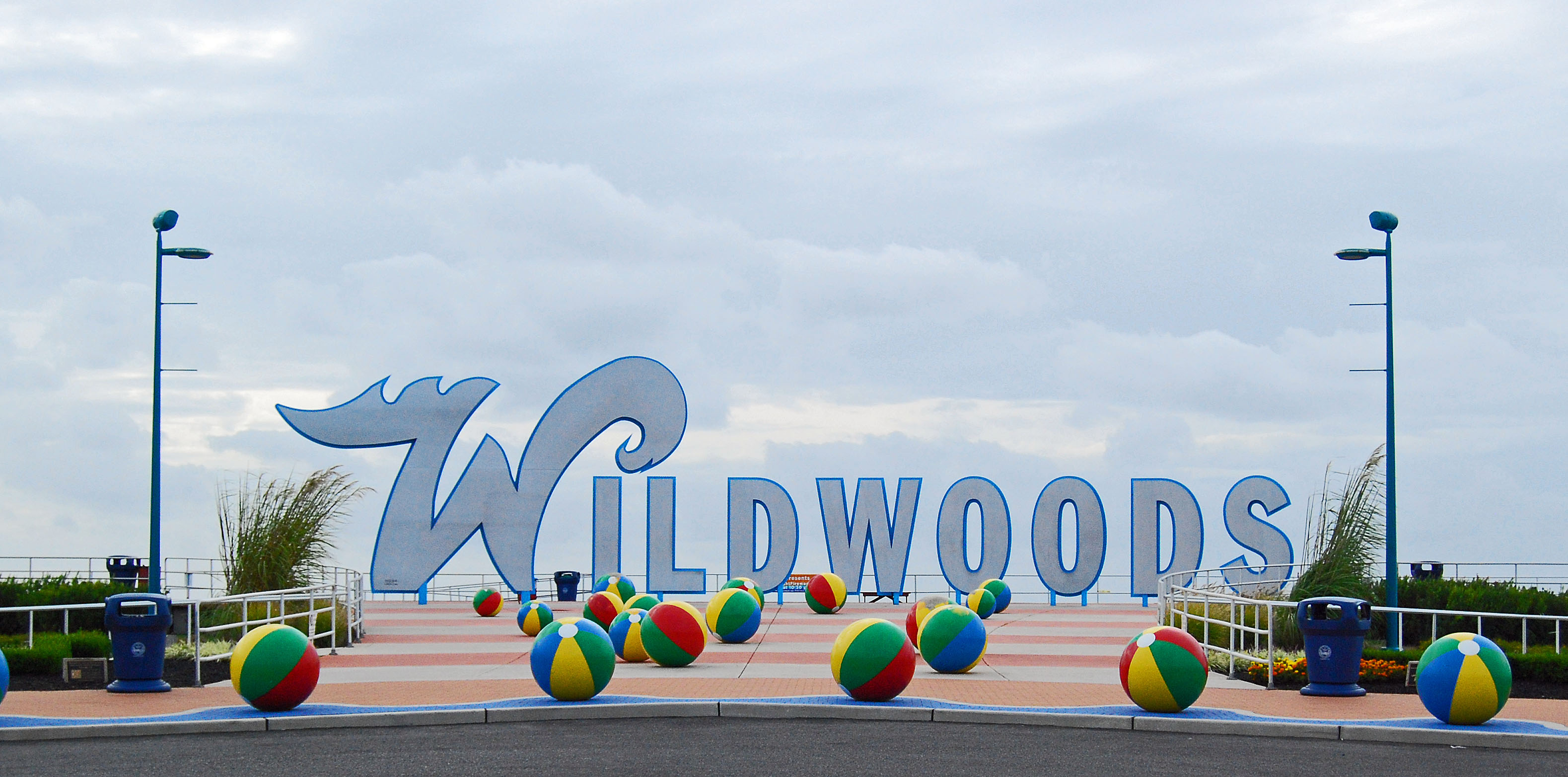
A sign for the Wildwoods on the Wildwood boardwalk

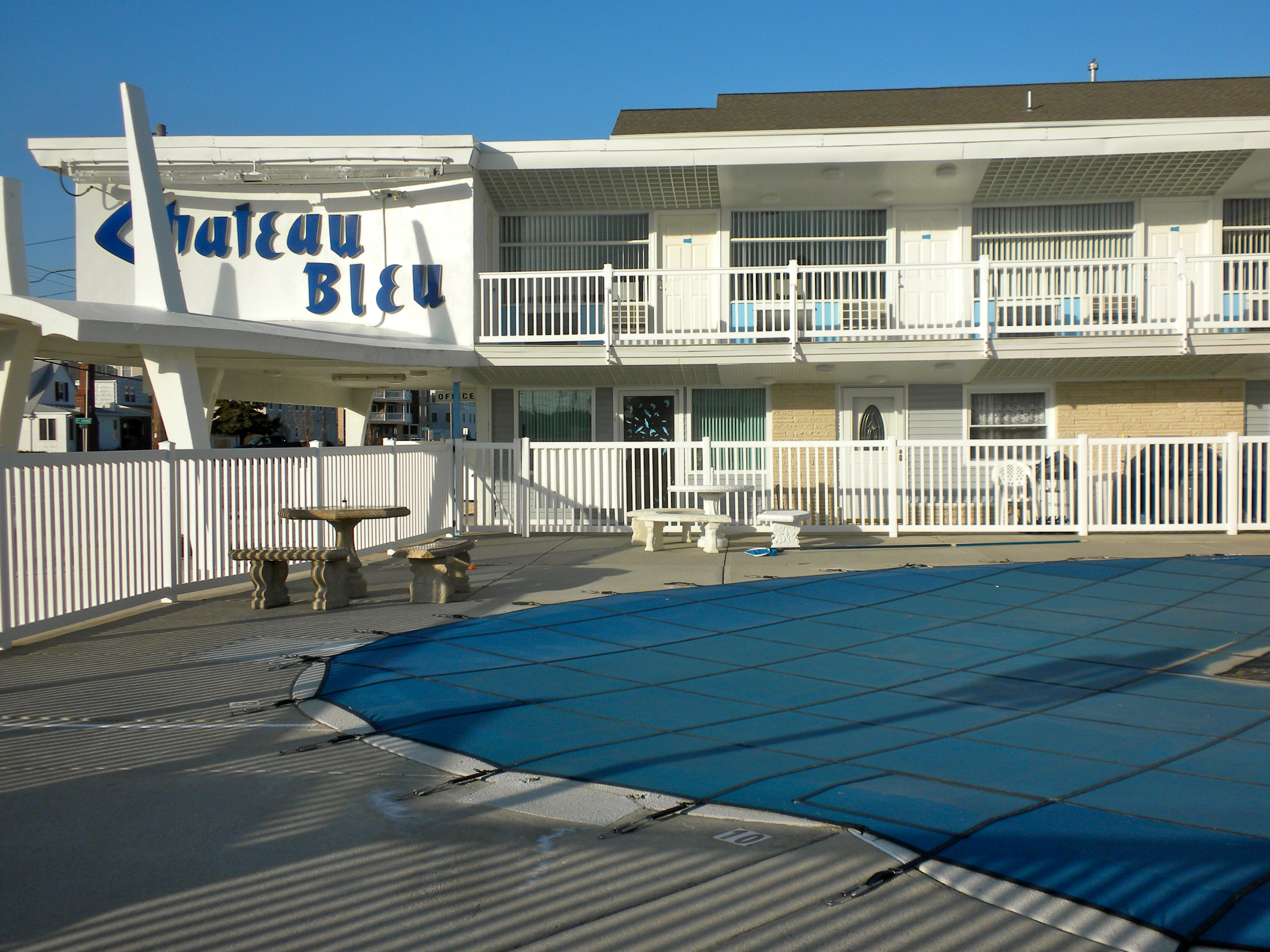
Chateau Bleu Motel, a typical doo-wop-style motel in Wildwood

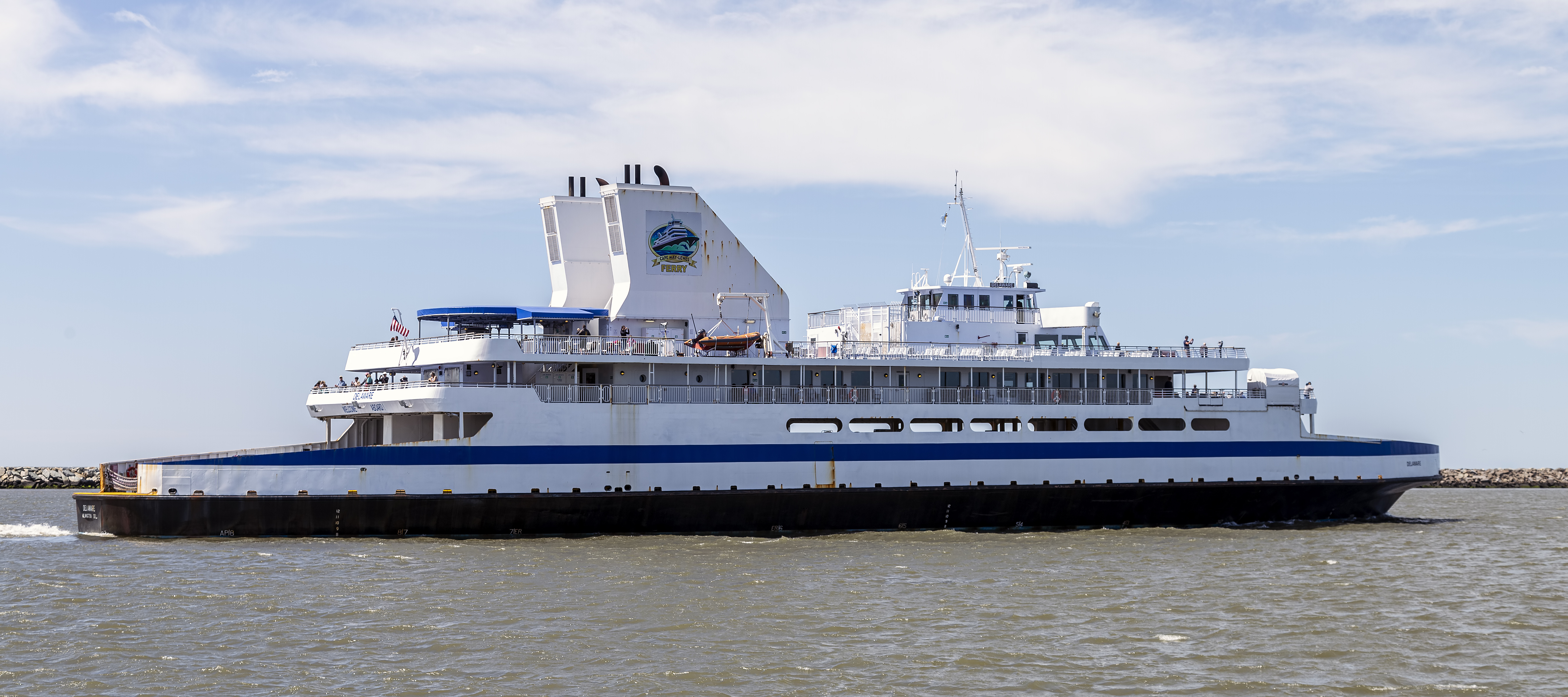
Cape May–Lewes Ferry crosses the Delaware Bay, connecting North Cape May with Lewes, Delaware.

The Wildwoods is used as a collective term for the four communities that have "Wildwood" as part of the municipality name — the Borough of Wildwood Crest, City of Wildwood, Borough of West Wildwood and the City of North Wildwood — together with Diamond Beach, a portion of Lower Township situated on the island. Its most notable features are its beach and 1.8 miles (2.9 km) boardwalk, home to the Morey's Piers amusement complex and Raging Waters and Ocean Oasis Waterparks owned by Morey's Piers. The boardwalk features a trolley called the "Tramcar", which runs from end to end.

The Wildwoods is home to over 200 motels, built during the Doo-Wop era of the 1950s and 1960s, in an area recognized by the state of New Jersey, known as the Wildwoods Shore Resort Historic District'

The term doo-wop was coined by Cape May's Mid-Atlantic Center For The Arts in the early 1990s to describe the unique, space-age architectural style, which is also referred to as the Googie or populuxe style. The motels are unique in appearance, with Vegas-like neon signs and fantastic architecture.

==== Cape May ====
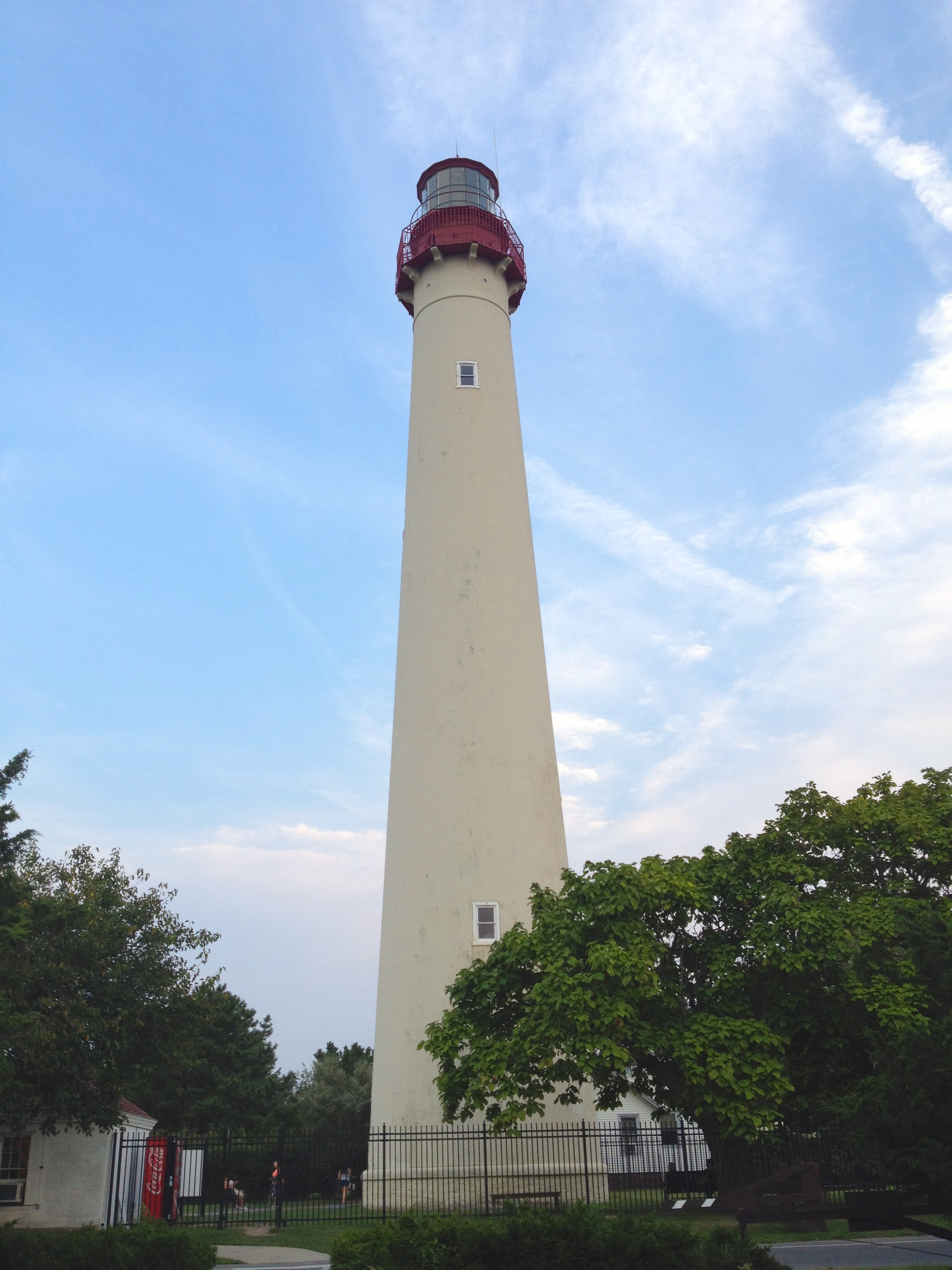
Cape May Lighthouse, located at the Jersey Shore's southernmost tip

Cape May is at the southern tip of Cape May Peninsula where the Delaware Bay meets the Atlantic Ocean and is one of the country's oldest vacation resort destinations. The Cape May – Lewes Ferry connects US 9 from Cape May to Lewes, Delaware.

== Beaches ==
The following is a list of all the towns within the state of New Jersey that have a beach either along the Raritan Bay or Atlantic Ocean, listed north to south:

Middlesex County

- Perth Amboy
- South Amboy
- Laurence Harbor (Old Bridge Township)

Monmouth County

- Cliffwood Beach (Aberdeen Township)
- Union Beach
- Keansburg
- Keyport
- Atlantic Highlands
- Highlands
- Sandy Hook (Middletown Township)
- Sea Bright
- Monmouth Beach
- Long Branch / Elberon
- Deal
- Allenhurst
- Loch Arbour
- Asbury Park
- Ocean Grove (Neptune Township)
- Bradley Beach
- Avon-by-the-Sea
- Belmar
- Spring Lake
- Sea Girt
- Manasquan

Ocean County

- Point Pleasant Beach
- Bay Head
- Mantoloking
- Normandy Beach (Brick Township)
- Chadwick Beach Island (Brick Township)
- Brick
- Dover Beaches North (Toms River)
- Ortley Beach (Toms River)
- Lavallette
- Dover Beaches South (Toms River)
- Seaside Heights
- Seaside Park
- Island Beach (Berkeley Township)
- Barnegat Light
- Loveladies (Long Beach Township)
- Harvey Cedars
- North Beach (Long Beach Township)
- Surf City
- Ship Bottom
- Beach Haven Crest (Long Beach Township)
- Beach Haven
- Brant Beach (Long Beach Township)

Atlantic County

- Brigantine
- Atlantic City
- Ventnor City
- Margate City
- Longport

Cape May County

- Ocean City
- Strathmere (Upper Township)
- Sea Isle City
- Avalon
- Stone Harbor
- North Wildwood
- Wildwood
- Wildwood Crest
- Diamond Beach (Lower Township)
- Cape May

Most ocean beaches in New Jersey charge admission to the beaches through the use of beach tags. Ocean beaches in New Jersey that do not use beach tags include Atlantic City, Strathmere (Upper Township), North Wildwood, Wildwood, and Wildwood Crest.

== Environmental issues ==
=== Climate change ===
The Jersey shore is expected to have increasing problems with the water supply in part due to saltwater intrusion, and also changes in weather patterns. Communities on the eastern shore are also expected to see significant change in the commercial fisheries along the coast, hurting communities dependent on fishing.

==== Sea level rise ====
The Jersey Shore is particularly vulnerable to sea level rise accelerated by climate change, and will be experiencing more sea level rise than the global average. This is in large part because of the slow down of the Atlantic meridional overturning circulation which will allow sea level rise 2 feet greater than average. The region already experiences frequent flooding during king tides and storm surge, because most infrastructure was built based on 20th century standards. Several academic studies have explore various responses to the sea level rise including managed retreat, improved coastal management practices to mitigate risk, and hard structures.

=== Hurricane Sandy ===
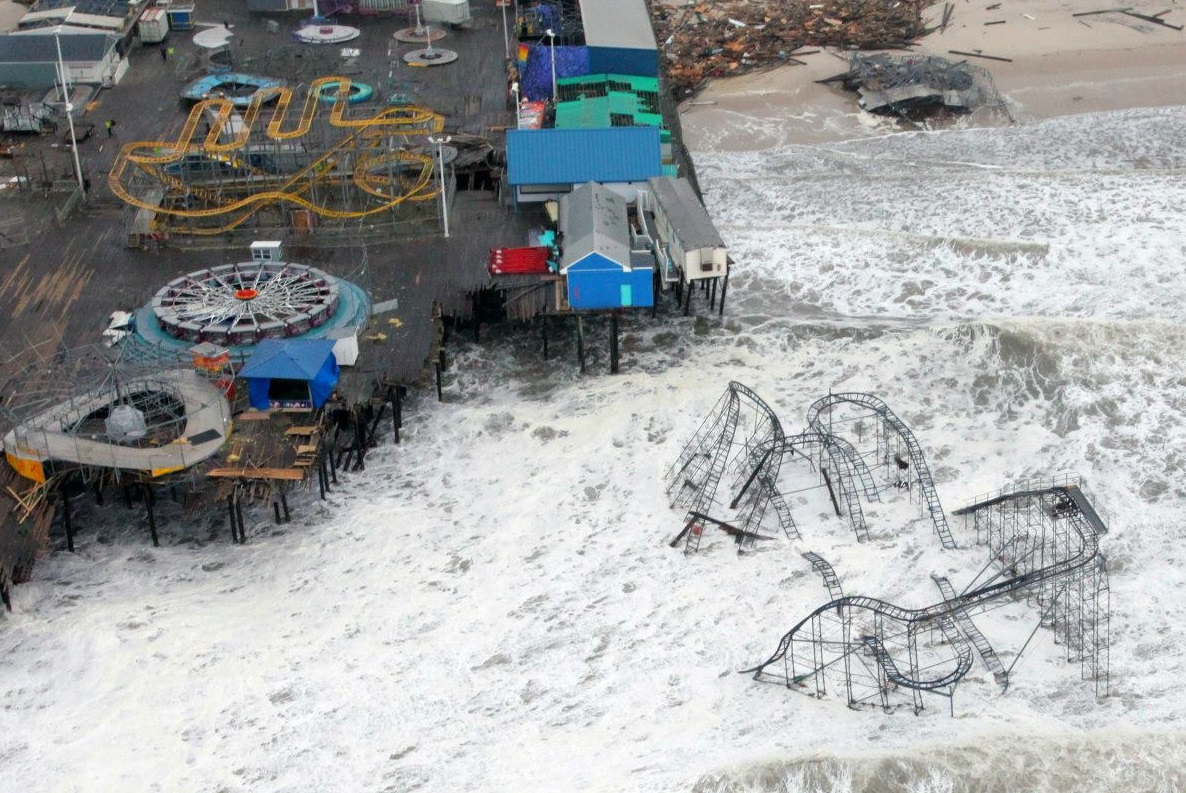
A Star Jet roller coaster at Casino Pier in Seaside Heights, which collapsed into the Atlantic Ocean after Hurricane Sandy in October 2012

The entirety of the Jersey Shore region was significantly damaged by Hurricane Sandy in October 2012. The devastating effect of the storm surge on property adjacent to the beach resulted in substantial cost to the reinsurance industry which has since advocated avoidance of rebuilding closely packed middle-class residences or flimsy commercial structures adjacent to the beach. The hurricane reached up to 74 mph. Hurricane Sandy's pure kinetic energy for storm surge and wave destruction potential reached a 5.8 out of 6 on the National Oceanic and Atmospheric Administration's scale. Storm surges reached 14 ft above average low tide. The Barrier Islands were especially damaged, leaving dozens of homes completely washed away. Many iconic places from "The Shore" were also damaged due to Hurricane Sandy, including the Belmar boardwalk, Casino Pier, and Funtown Pier.

== Retail businesses ==
Unlike areas in the interior of the state, which has many big box stores and malls, small businesses are a significant portion of the economy of barrier island Jersey Shore towns. This is because small businesses can more easily adapt to the seasonal nature of business in shore towns. Stores that are located at the shore are all unique ranging from psychics and accessories at Ocean City to home-made chocolates in Long Beach Island. In addition, many shore towns deliberately stymie the entry of big box stores because they want to reduce traffic.

== Property ownership ==
Every town along the Jersey Shore has properties owned by people who do not live in New Jersey. State resident ownership has dropped by 30% since 1989. People from out of state own about 37% of the properties in shore towns. In 10 towns, a majority of the property is owned by out of state residents. Summer tourism swells the population of towns along the shore. Some towns have fewer than 5,000 year-round residents, then explode to more than 30,000 residents during the summer. Monmouth County has the highest percentage of New Jersey resident ownership, at 88%, followed by Ocean County at 80%, 57% in Atlantic County, and only 27% in Cape May County. Avalon has the lowest percentage of state resident ownership at 27.5%, while Monmouth Beach has the highest at 92.7%.

Percent of residential property owned by NJ residents
Town	County	Percentage	Resident Population 2020
Allenhurst	Monmouth	67.1%	472
Asbury Park	Monmouth	88.4%	15,188
Atlantic City	Atlantic	74%	38,497
Atlantic Highlands	Monmouth	92.5%	4,414
Avalon	Cape May	27.5%	1,243
Avon-by-the-Sea	Monmouth	90%	1,933
Barnegat Light	Ocean	69%	640
Bay Head	Ocean	80.5%	930
Beach Haven	Ocean	66.9%	1,027
Belmar	Monmouth	90.3%	5,907
Bradley Beach	Monmouth	87.4%	4,282
Brigantine	Atlantic	38.8%	7,716
Cape May	Cape May	48.2%	2,768
Cape May Point	Cape May	39.5%	305
Deal	Monmouth	39.4%	900
Harvey Cedars	Ocean	66.9%	391
Highlands	Monmouth	88.4%	4,621
Lavallete	Ocean	87.2%	1,787
Loch Arbour	Monmouth	79.7%	224
Long Beach	Ocean	67.7%	3,153
Long Branch	Monmouth	89.8%	31,667
Longport	Atlantic	40.4%	893
Manasquan	Monmouth	92.6%	5,938
Mantoloking	Ocean	75.5%	331
Margate City	Atlantic	52.7%	5,317
Monmouth Beach	Monmouth	92.7%	3,174
North Wildwood	Cape May	45.2%	3,621
Ocean City	Cape May	43.9%	11,229
Point Pleasant Beach	Ocean	89.4%	4,766
Sea Bright	Monmouth	85.8%	1,449
Sea Girt	Monmouth	88.9%	1,866
Sea Isle City	Cape May	34.5%	2,104
Seaside Heights	Ocean	83.3%	2,440
Seaside Park	Ocean	80.9%	1,436
Ship Bottom	Ocean	72.9%	1,098
Spring Lake	Monmouth	83%	2,789
Stone Harbor	Cape May	29.6%	796
Surf City	Ocean	77.2%	1,243
Ventnor City	Atlantic	62.8%	9,210
Wildwood	Cape May	52.8%	5,157
Wildwood Crest	Cape May	55.4%	3,101

== In popular culture ==
=== Films ===
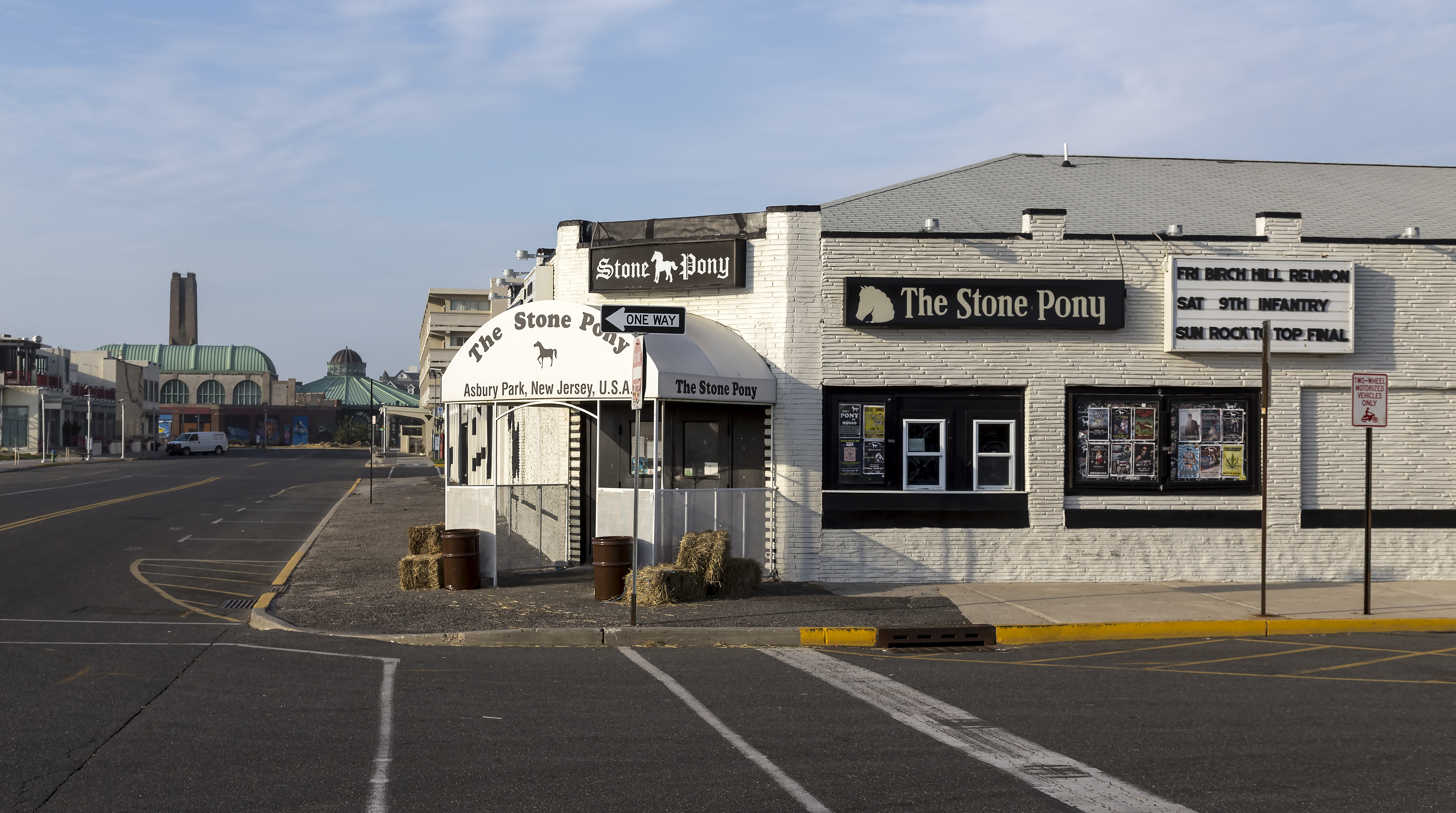
The Stone Pony in Asbury Park, where Bruce Springsteen, Bon Jovi, and Southside Johnny appeared regularly early in their careers

- 2023: Under the Boardwalk (2023 film), a romantic comedy and musical animation film, directed by David Soren (animator) starring Keke Palmer and Michael Cera. The film is about Hermit Crabs and is set in the fictional town of Shore Point, which is on the Jersey shore.
- 2011: Warrior, a sports action movie filmed partly in Atlantic City
- 2010: The Bounty Hunter, a romantic action movie starring Jennifer Aniston filmed partly in Atlantic City
- 2009: According to Greta, a drama film starring Hilary Duff based and filmed in Ocean Grove
- 2008: The Wrestler, an Academy Award-nominated film directed by Darren Aronofsky and starring Mickey Rourke, Marissa Tomei, and Evan Rachel Wood, includes several scenes in Asbury Park.
- 2007: Greetings From The Shore, a romantic comedy based and filmed in Lavallette
- 2001: Ocean's Eleven, the remake of the 1960 Rat Pack heist film of the same name, starring George Clooney and Bernie Mac, opens with scenes at Trump Plaza in Atlantic City.
- 1994: Clerks, a comedy based and filmed in Leonardo
- 1987: The Pick-up Artist, a romantic comedy starring Robert Downey Jr. and Molly Ringwald based and filmed partly in Atlantic City
- 1983: Eddie and the Cruisers, a musical drama filmed partly in Atlantic City and Wildwood.
- 1980: Atlantic City, starring Susan Sarandon as a casino waitress and Burt Lancaster as an aging former gangster, based and largely filmed in Atlantic City
- 1975: Ragtime, a drama starring James Cagney based and partly filmed in Atlantic City
- 1972: The King of Marvin Gardens, a drama starring Jack Nicholson based and largely filmed in Atlantic City

=== Music ===
The Jersey Shore is home to numerous rock music clubs, including The Stone Pony in Asbury Park, where Bruce Springsteen, Bon Jovi, and Southside Johnny appeared early in their careers.

Bill Haley & His Comets first performed "Rock Around the Clock" live at Hof Brau Hotel in Wildwood.

=== Television ===
- 2026: The Jersey Shore served as a central setting for the Netflix comedy-drama series The Four Seasons, co-created by Tina Fey and Tracey Wigfield. The third and fourth episodes of the show's second season follow the main characters on a beach vacation to the region, featuring iconic boardwalk elements, beach rides, and local mainstays. While narratively set in Point Pleasant Beach, the episodes were primarily filmed on location in Ocean Grove and Point Pleasant Beach in October 2025.
- 2017: MTV's revival of MTV Beach House is filmed in Loveladies and Long Beach Township on Long Beach Island.
- 2010 to 2014: The HBO series Boardwalk Empire is largely based on and set during the prohibition era in Atlantic City.
- 2012: Season Four of The Real Housewives of New Jersey takes place on the Jersey Shore; the families of cast members Teresa Giudice and Melissa Gorga own houses in Toms River.
- 2009 to 2012: Seasons one, three, five, and six of MTV's reality series Jersey Shore are based and filmed in Seaside Heights.
- 2012: Jersey Shore Shark Attack, a Syfy television film, is set on the Jersey Shore.
- 1998 to 2004: MTV Beach House, a one-hour MTV music video block, was based in Seaside Heights in 1998 and again in 2002, and for two episodes of True Life, in 2003 and 2004.
- 1999 to 2007: The HBO series The Sopranos features multiple episodes set at the Jersey Shore, including season four's acclaimed "Whitecaps", which was filmed in Sea Bright and Asbury Park, which appeared in both season two's "Funhouse" and season three's "...To Save Us All from Satan's Power". Other locations featured in the series include Monmouth Beach, Long Branch, and the Borgata in Atlantic City.
- 1992 The Fox TV series Down the Shore, starring Louis Mandylor and Anna Gunn, is set in Belmar.
