= Chadwick Beach Island, New Jersey =

Populated place in Ocean County, New Jersey, US

- Unincorporated community
- Chadwick Beach's location in Ocean County (Inset: Ocean County in New Jersey) Chadwick Beach Island, New Jersey (New Jersey) Chadwick Beach Island, New Jersey (the United States)
- Coordinates: 39°58′58″N 74°03′48″W
- Country: United States
- State: New Jersey
- County: Ocean
- Township: Toms River
- Elevation: 20 ft (6 m)
- ZIP Code: 08735
- GNIS feature ID: 0873814

Chadwick Beach Island is an unincorporated community along the Jersey Shore located in Toms River, in Ocean County, in the U.S. state of New Jersey, next to Barnegat Bay on a barrier island. It is an exclusive beach/island resort community about 70 miles (110 km) south of New York City, 60 miles (97 km) north-northeast of Philadelphia, and 150 miles (240 km) northeast of Washington, D.C.
