= Shrewsbury Township, New Jersey =

Township in Monmouth County, New Jersey, US

- Township
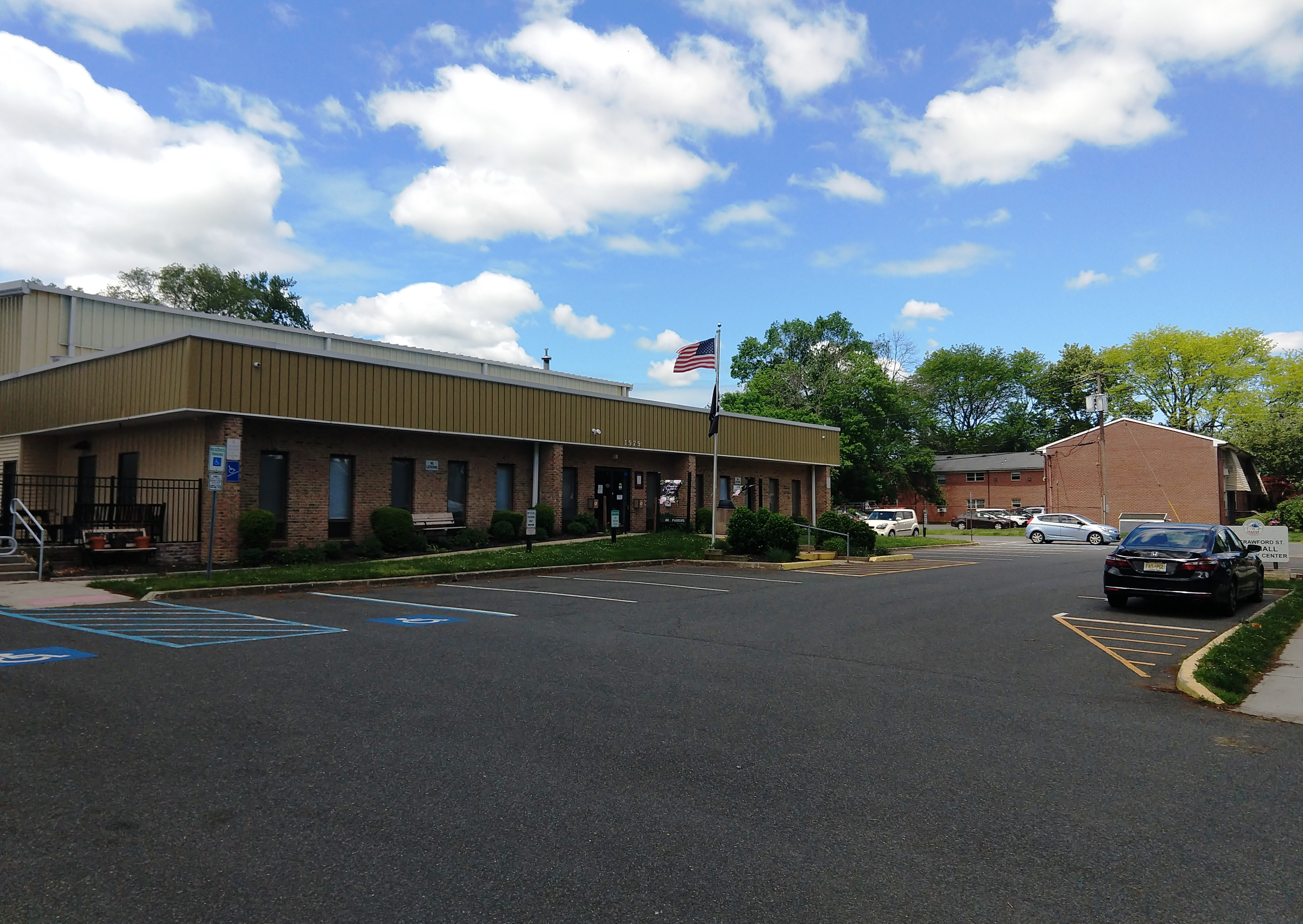
- Shrewsbury Township Hall

- Seal

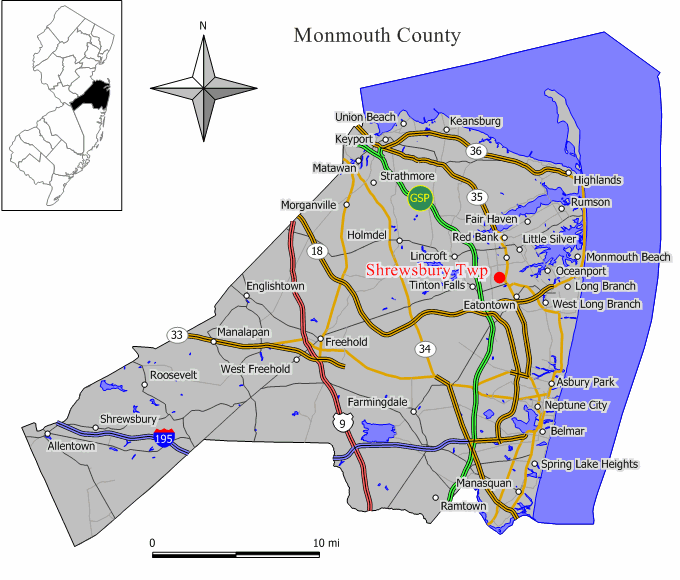
- Location of Shrewsbury Township in Monmouth County highlighted in red (right). Inset map: Location of Monmouth County in New Jersey highlighted in black (left).

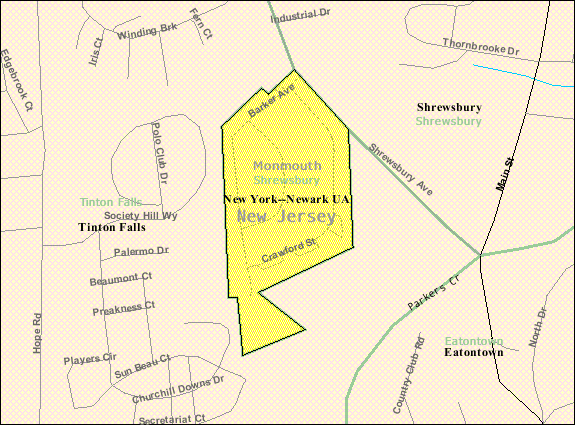
- Census Bureau map of Shrewsbury Township, New Jersey

- Location in Monmouth County Location in New Jersey Location in the United States
- Coordinates: 40.313233°N 74.071543°W
- Country: United States
- State: New Jersey
- County: Monmouth
- Formed: October 31, 1693
- Incorporated: February 21, 1798
- Named for: Shrewsbury, England

Government
  - Type: Township
  - Body: Township Committee
  - Mayor: Lester J. Jennings (D, term ends December 31, 2027)
  - Municipal clerk: Julie Martin

Area
  - Total: 0.10 sq mi (0.26 km^{2})
  - Land: 0.10 sq mi (0.26 km^{2})
  - Water: 0 sq mi (0.00 km^{2}) 0.00%
  - Rank: 565th of 565 in state 53rd of 53 in county
- Elevation: 39 ft (12 m)

Population (2020)
  - Total: 1,076
  - Estimate (2023): 1,071
  - Rank: 528th of 565 in state 48th of 53 in county
  - Density: 10,855.5/sq mi (4,191.3/km^{2})
  - Rank: 35th of 565 in state 1st of 53 in county
- Time zone: UTC−05:00 (Eastern (EST))
  - Summer (DST): UTC−04:00 (Eastern (EDT))
- ZIP Code: 07724
- Area code: 732
- FIPS code: 3402567365
- GNIS feature ID: 0882603
- Website: www.townshipofshrewsbury.com/index.html

Shrewsbury Township is a township situated in the Jersey Shore region, within Monmouth County, in the U.S. state of New Jersey. As of the 2020 United States census, the township's population was 1,076, a decrease of 65 (−5.7%) from the 2010 census count of 1,141, which in turn reflected an increase of 43 (+3.9%) from the 1,098 counted in the 2000 census.

Covering nearly 1,000 square miles (2,600 km^{2}) when it was first formed in 1693, the originally large Shrewsbury Township steadily diminished in size as 74 new municipalities were created from its former boundaries, leaving the township as it currently exists, covering 0.097 square miles (0.25 km^{2}), ranked as New Jersey's smallest municipality by area. The combined population of the municipalities that were previously part of old Shrewsbury Township was 935,232 in 2020, which would have made it the 13th largest city in the country, slightly more than that of Fort Worth, Texas.

== History ==
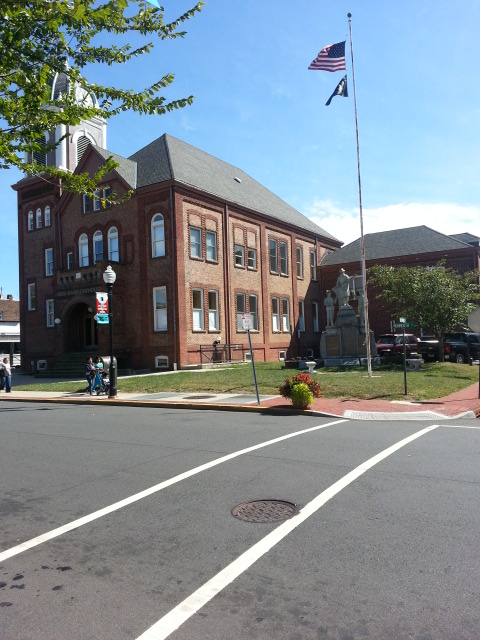
Original Shrewsbury Township Hall, later became the Red Bank Borough Hall, now in use by the Roman Catholic Diocese of Trenton

Shrewsbury was part of the Navesink Patent or Monmouth Tract granted soon after the creation of East Jersey in 1665.

When it was formed in 1693, Shrewsbury Township covered an area of almost 1,000 square miles (2,600 km^{2}), extending to the north to the Navesink River, south to include all of present-day Ocean County, east to the Atlantic Ocean and west to the present-day border of Monmouth County. It retained its size and scope until 1750, when Stafford Township was formed, taking away most of present-day Ocean County. The Parker Homestead, one of the oldest buildings in state, was built by early settlers to the region.

What is now Shrewsbury Township was originally formed on October 31, 1693, and was created as a township by the Township Act of 1798 of the New Jersey Legislature on February 21, 1798.

=== Creation of new municipalities ===
Over the centuries, portions of the township have been taken to form Stafford Township (March 3, 1750), Dover Township (March 1, 1768, now Toms River Township), Howell Township (February 23, 1801), Ocean Township (February 24, 1849), Atlantic Township (February 18, 1847, now Colts Neck), Red Bank (March 17, 1870), Eatontown (April 4, 1873), Rumson (May 15, 1907), Fair Haven (March 28, 1912), Little Silver (March 19, 1923), Shrewsbury borough (March 22, 1926) and New Shrewsbury (April 15, 1950, now Tinton Falls). The township was named for Shrewsbury, England.

The remaining land was formerly owned by the Government and called Camp Vail, a complex of 265 homes constructed for families of Fort Monmouth employees. After World War II the government planned to close the site but the established families, with nowhere else to go, purchased the land from the Army with the help of Ann Switek who arranged to maintain the Original Township Charter which had been abandoned. Ann Switek was then elected Town Clerk of Shrewsbury Township and maintained that post for close to 50 years. Camp Vail became Alfred Vail Mutual Association, one of New Jersey's first cooperative housing entities. Following the end of federal subsidies to Shrewsbury Township schools and services residents of the community outside the Vail Homes felt that the residents in the homes received undue benefits. They attempted to force the Vail Homes out of Shrewsbury Township but were unable to. They instead seceded from Shrewsbury to form New Shrewsbury which was later renamed Tinton Falls.

== Geography ==
According to the United States Census Bureau, the township had a total area of 0.1 square miles (0.26 km^{2}), all of which was land.

Covering about 1,000 square miles (2,600 km^{2}) when it was established in 1693, a total of 74 municipalities have been established from its original territory, leaving Shrewsbury Township as the state's smallest municipality.

The borough borders the Monmouth County municipalities of Shrewsbury and Tinton Falls.

== Demographics ==
Historical population
Census	Pop.	Note	%±
1790	4,673		—
1810	3,773	*	—
1820	4,824		27.9%
1830	4,700		−2.6%
1840	5,917		25.9%
1850	3,182	*	−46.2%
1860	4,132		29.9%
1870	3,354	*	−18.8%
1880	3,842	*	14.5%
1890	4,222		9.9%
1900	3,842	*	−9.0%
1910	3,238	*	−15.7%
1920	1,944		−40.0%
1930	1,052	*	−45.9%
1940	1,347		28.0%
1950	1,388		3.0%
1960	1,204	*	−13.3%
1970	1,164		−3.3%
1980	995		−14.5%
1990	1,098		10.4%
2000	1,098		0.0%
2010	1,141		3.9%
2020	1,076		−5.7%
2023 (est.)	1,071		−0.5%
Population sources: 1790–1920 1840 1850–1870; 1850 1870 1880–1890; 1890–1910 1910–1930 1940–2000; 2000 2010 2020 * = Lost territory in previous decade.

=== 2010 census ===
The 2010 United States census counted 1,141 people, 583 households, and 266 families in the township. The population density was 10,877.7 per square mile (4,199.9/km^{2}). There were 648 housing units at an average density of 6,177.7 per square mile (2,385.2/km^{2}). The racial makeup was 72.13% (823) White, 14.29% (163) Black or African American, 0.09% (1) Native American, 6.57% (75) Asian, 0.00% (0) Pacific Islander, 2.98% (34) from other races, and 3.94% (45) from two or more races. Hispanic or Latino of any race were 14.11% (161) of the population.

Of the 583 households, 22.1% had children under the age of 18; 25.4% were married couples living together; 15.6% had a female householder with no husband present and 54.4% were non-families. Of all households, 47.5% were made up of individuals and 22.5% had someone living alone who was 65 years of age or older. The average household size was 1.96 and the average family size was 2.79.

18.8% of the population were under the age of 18, 6.5% from 18 to 24, 30.0% from 25 to 44, 26.8% from 45 to 64, and 18.0% who were 65 years of age or older. The median age was 41.9 years. For every 100 females, the population had 82.6 males. For every 100 females ages 18 and older there were 76.2 males.

The Census Bureau's 2006–2010 American Community Survey showed that (in 2010 inflation-adjusted dollars) median household income was $51,548 (with a margin of error of +/− $8,211) and the median family income was $55,625 (+/− $11,553). Males had a median income of $44,844 (+/− $7,203) versus $36,136 (+/− $6,032) for females. The per capita income for the borough was $28,891 (+/− $3,658). About 3.1% of families and 7.8% of the population were below the poverty line, including 6.7% of those under age 18 and 11.0% of those age 65 or over.

=== 2000 census ===
As of the 2000 United States census there were 1,098 people, 521 households, and 254 families residing in the township. The population density was 11,624.7 inhabitants per square mile (4,488.3/km^{2}). There were 546 housing units at an average density of 5,780.6 per square mile (2,231.9/km^{2}). The racial makeup of the township was 66.76% White, 16.67% African American, 10.02% Asian, 2.82% from other races, and 3.73% from two or more races. Hispanic or Latino of any race were 6.65% of the population.

There were 521 households, out of which 24.6% had children under the age of 18 living with them, 28.6% were married couples living together, 16.3% had a female householder with no husband present, and 51.1% were non-families. 39.5% of all households were made up of individuals, and 11.7% had someone living alone who was 65 years of age or older. The average household size was 2.10 and the average family size was 2.89.

In the township the population was spread out, with 20.6% under the age of 18, 9.3% from 18 to 24, 37.8% from 25 to 44, 21.5% from 45 to 64, and 10.8% who were 65 years of age or older. The median age was 35 years. For every 100 females, there were 93.3 males. For every 100 females age 18 and over, there were 90.0 males.

The median income for a household in the township was $36,875, and the median income for a family was $42,500. Males had a median income of $32,813 versus $30,598 for females. The per capita income for the township was $23,574. About 6.9% of families and 8.8% of the population were below the poverty line, including 12.7% of those under age 18 and 11.8% of those age 65 or over.

== Government ==
=== Local government ===
Shrewsbury Township is governed under the Township form of New Jersey municipal government, one of 141 municipalities (of the 564) statewide that use this form, the second-most commonly used form of government in the state. The governing body is comprised of the three-member Township Committee, whose members are elected directly by the voters in partisan elections to serve three-year terms of office on a staggered basis, with one seat coming up for election each year as part of the November general election in a three-year cycle. At an annual reorganization meeting, the Township Committee selects one of its members to serve as Mayor.

As of 2025, members of the Shrewsbury Township Committee are Mayor Lester J. Jennings (D, term on committee ends December 31, 2026; term as mayor ends 2025); Deputy Mayor Lynda Lettice (D, term on committee ends 2027; term as deputy mayor ends 2025) and Glenwood J. Puhak (D, 2025).

With Maryellen McNama-Bailly taking office in January 2015, control of the council shifted to the Republican Party. Control of the Township Committee shifted back to the Democratic Party on January 1, 2017, with the election of Glen Puhak in the November 2016 General Election. With Lester J. Jennings defeating incumbent Republican Maryellen McNama-Bailly in the 2017 General Election, Democrats had full control of the council.

In 2018, the township had an average property tax bill of $4,169, the lowest in the county, compared to an average bill of $9,227 in Monmouth County and $8,767 statewide.

=== Federal, state and county representation ===
Shrewsbury Township is located in the 4th Congressional District and is part of New Jersey's 11th state legislative district.

For the 119th United States Congress, New Jersey's 4th congressional district is represented by Chris Smith (R, Manchester Township). New Jersey is represented in the United States Senate by Democrats Cory Booker (Newark, term ends 2027) and Andy Kim (Moorestown, term ends 2031).

For the 2026–2027 session, the 11th legislative district of the New Jersey Legislature is represented in the New Jersey Senate by Vin Gopal (D, Long Branch) and in the General Assembly by Margie Donlon (D, Ocean Township) and Luanne Peterpaul (D, Long Branch).

Monmouth County is governed by a Board of County Commissioners composed of five members who are elected at-large to serve three-year terms of office on a staggered basis, with either one or two seats up for election each year as part of the November general election. At an annual reorganization meeting held in the beginning of January, the board selects one of its members to serve as director and another as deputy director.

As of 2025, Monmouth County's Commissioners are Director Thomas A. Arnone (R, Neptune City, 2025), Susan M. Kiley (R, Hazlet Township, 2027), Erik Anderson (R, Shrewsbury, 2026), Nick DiRocco (R, Wall Township, 2025), and Deputy Director Ross F. Licitra (R, Marlboro Township, 2026).

Constitutional officers elected on a countywide basis are Clerk Christine Giordano Hanlon (R, 2025; Ocean Township), Sheriff Shaun Golden (R, 2025; Howell Township) and Surrogate Rosemarie D. Peters (R, 2026; Middletown Township).

=== Politics ===
United States presidential election results for Shrewsbury Township
Year	Republican		Democratic		Third party(ies)	
Year	No.	%	No.	%	No.	%
2024	189	37.65%	302	60.16%	11	2.19%
2020	192	35.29%	338	62.13%	14	2.57%
2016	169	35.73%	278	58.77%	26	5.50%
2012	129	29.79%	286	66.05%	18	4.16%
2008	168	35.00%	300	62.50%	12	2.50%
2004	185	40.84%	263	58.06%	5	1.10%
2000	115	31.59%	232	63.74%	17	4.67%
1996	106	31.45%	221	65.58%	10	2.97%
1992	132	30.14%	196	44.75%	110	25.11%

As of March 2011, there were a total of 638 registered voters in Shrewsbury Township, of which 229 (35.9%) were registered as Democrats, 114 (17.9%) were registered as Republicans and 294 (46.1%) were registered as Unaffiliated. One voter was registered to another party.

In the 2016 presidential election, Democrat Hillary Clinton received 57.9% of the vote (260 cast), ahead of Republican Donald Trump with 36.1% (162 votes) and other candidates with 6.0% (27 votes), among the 449 ballots cast by the township's 679 registered voters, for a turnout of 66.13%.In the 2012 presidential election, Democrat Barack Obama received 66.1% of the vote (286 cast), ahead of Republican Mitt Romney with 29.8% (129 votes), and other candidates with 4.2% (18 votes), among the 438 ballots cast by the township's 655 registered voters (5 ballots were spoiled), for a turnout of 66.9%. In the 2008 presidential election, Democrat Barack Obama received 62.1% of the vote (300 cast), ahead of Republican John McCain with 34.8% (168 votes) and other candidates with 2.5% (12 votes), among the 483 ballots cast by the township's 679 registered voters, for a turnout of 71.1%. In the 2004 presidential election, Democrat John Kerry received 57.8% of the vote (263 ballots cast), outpolling Republican George W. Bush with 40.7% (185 votes) and other candidates with 0.8% (5 votes), among the 455 ballots cast by the borough's 640 registered voters, for a turnout percentage of 71.1.

Gubernatorial election results for Shrewsbury Township
Year	Republican		Democratic		Third party(ies)	
Year	No.	%	No.	%	No.	%
2025	120	29.48%	283	69.53%	4	0.98%
2021	111	36.04%	189	61.36%	8	2.60%
2017	107	37.81%	166	58.66%	10	3.53%
2013	166	62.17%	94	35.21%	7	2.62%
2009	135	44.85%	135	44.85%	31	10.30%
2005	121	37.69%	179	55.76%	21	6.54%

In the 2013 gubernatorial election, Republican Chris Christie received 62.2% of the vote (166 cast), ahead of Democrat Barbara Buono with 35.2% (94 votes), and other candidates with 2.6% (7 votes), among the 271 ballots cast by the township's 651 registered voters (4 ballots were spoiled), for a turnout of 41.6%. In the 2009 gubernatorial election, Democrat Jon Corzine received 44.1% of the vote (135 ballots cast), ahead of Republican Chris Christie with 44.1% (135 votes), Independent Chris Daggett with 7.5% (23 votes) and other candidates with 2.6% (8 votes), among the 306 ballots cast by the township's 643 registered voters, yielding a 47.6% turnout.

United States Senate election results for Shrewsbury Township1
Year	Republican		Democratic		Third party(ies)	
Year	No.	%	No.	%	No.	%
2024	169	35.81%	289	61.23%	14	2.97%
2018	133	35.75%	216	58.06%	23	6.18%
2012	138	34.24%	252	62.53%	13	3.23%
2006	108	38.71%	161	57.71%	10	3.58%

United States Senate election results for Shrewsbury Township2
Year	Republican		Democratic		Third party(ies)	
Year	No.	%	No.	%	No.	%
2020	181	34.54%	327	62.40%	16	3.05%
2014	95	35.19%	170	62.96%	5	1.85%
2013	69	36.13%	122	63.87%	0	0.00%
2008	150	33.71%	279	62.70%	16	3.60%

== Education ==
Public school students in kindergarten through eighth grade attend the three schools in the Tinton Falls School District, a regional district that also serves students from the neighboring community of Tinton Falls and the dependent children of military families based at Naval Weapons Station Earle. All three of the district's schools are located in Tinton Falls. Shrewsbury Township is represented with one seat out of nine on the district's board of education. As of the 2020–21 school year, the district, comprised of three schools, had an enrollment of 1,331 students and 153.4 classroom teachers (on an FTE basis), for a student–teacher ratio of 8.7:1. Schools in the district (with 2020–21 enrollment data from the National Center for Education Statistics) are Mahala F. Atchison Elementary School with 438 students in grades K–3, Swimming River Elementary School with 440 students in grades 4–5 and Tinton Falls Middle School with 446 students in grades 6–8.

Students in public school for ninth through twelfth grades attend Monmouth Regional High School, located in Tinton Falls. The school also serves students from Eatontown, Tinton Falls and Naval Weapons Station Earle. As of the 2020–2021 school year, the high school had an enrollment of 953 students and 90.2 classroom teachers (on an FTE basis), for a student–teacher ratio of 10.6:1. Seats on the high school district's nine-member board of education are allocated based on the populations of the constituent municipalities, with one seat assigned to Shrewsbury Township.

Students may also apply to attend one of the magnet schools in the Monmouth County Vocational School District—Marine Academy of Science and Technology, Academy of Allied Health & Science, High Technology High School, Biotechnology High School, and Communications High School.

== Transportation ==
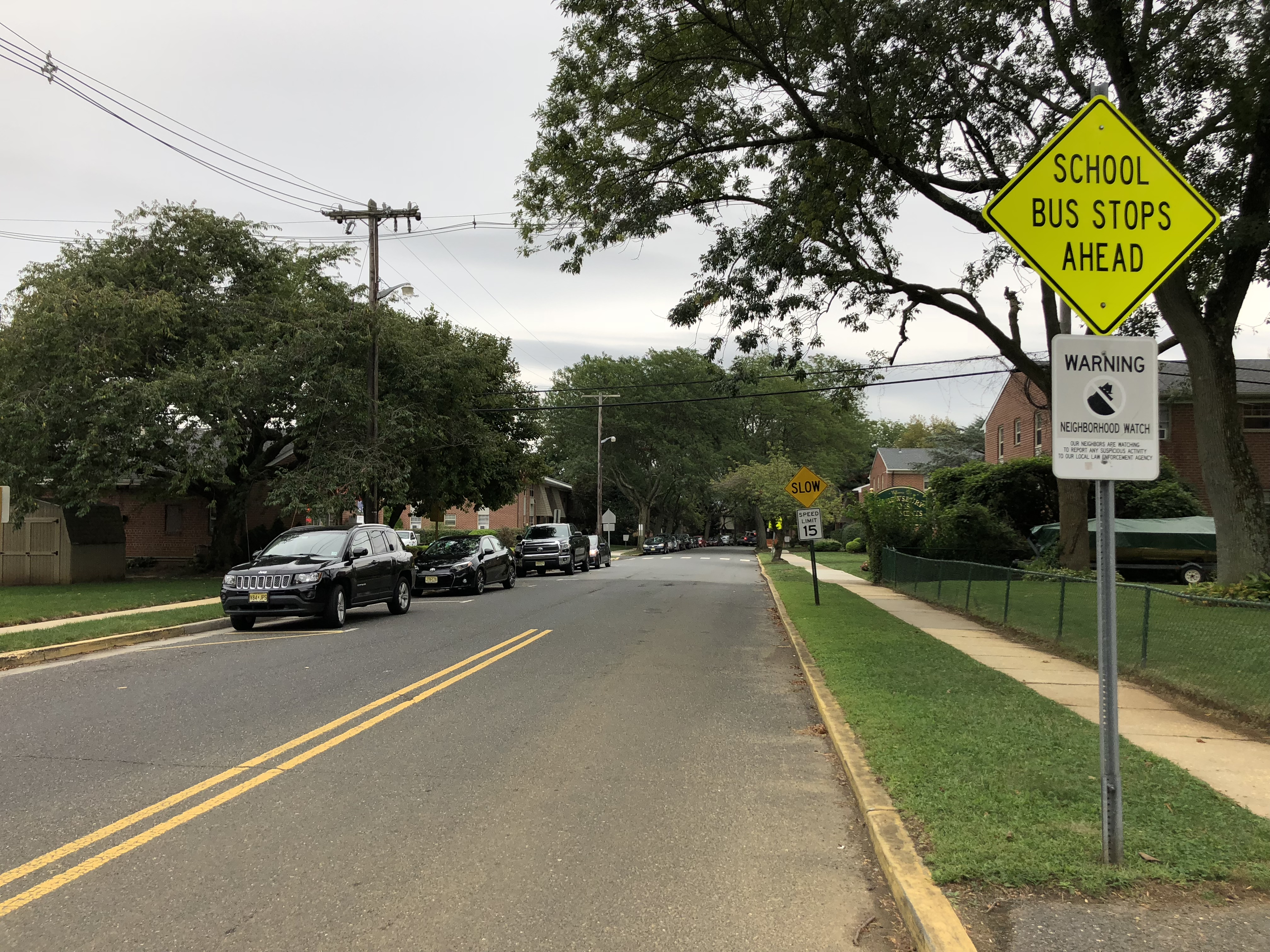
Crawford Street, the longest road within Shrewsbury Township

As of May 2010, the township had a total of 1.49 miles (2.40 km) of roadways all of which were maintained by the municipality.

No Interstate, U.S., state or county highways serve Shrewsbury Township directly. The only access to the township via vehicle is from Shrewsbury Avenue (County Route 13). Only municipally maintained streets cross the township, the longest of which is Crawford Street. Nearby major roads that are accessible in neighboring municipalities include CR 520, CR 537, Route 18, Route 35, Route 36, Route 71, and the Garden State Parkway.

== Notable people ==
People who were born in, residents of, or otherwise closely associated with Shrewsbury Township include:

- John M. Corlies (1868–1926), politician who served on the Monmouth County, New Jersey Board of Chosen Freeholders, the Shrewsbury Township Committee, and as mayor of Rumson
