= Bradley Beach, New Jersey =

Borough in Monmouth County, New Jersey, US

- Borough
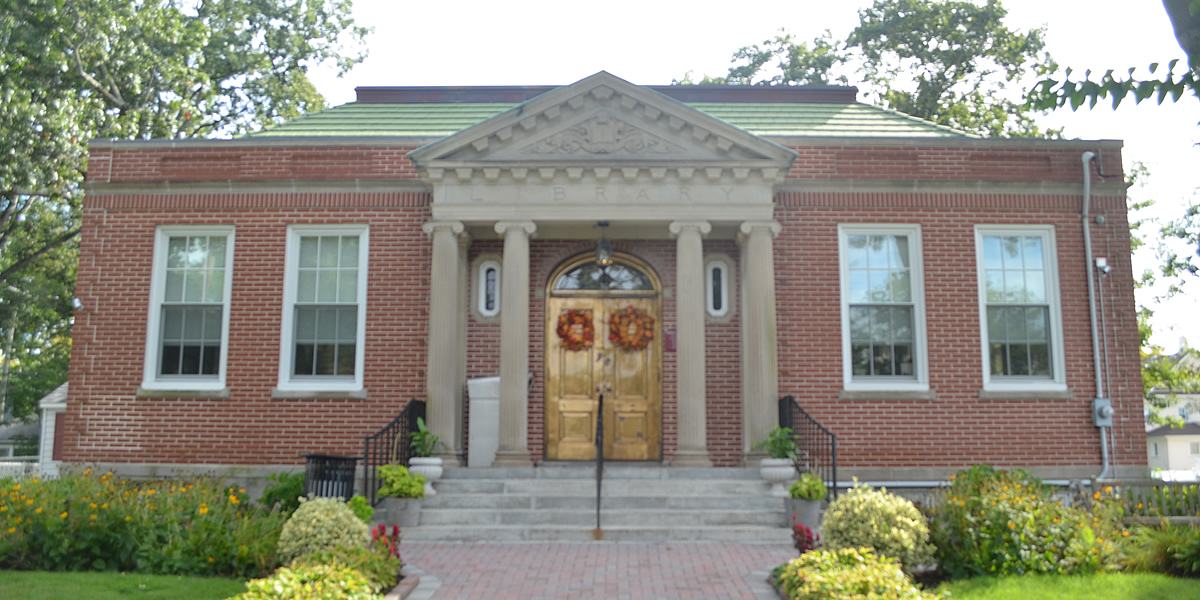
- The Bradley Beach Public Library

- logo
- Motto: "New Jersey's Family Resort"
- Location of Bradley Beach in Monmouth County highlighted in red (left). Inset map: Location of Monmouth County in New Jersey highlighted in orange (right).

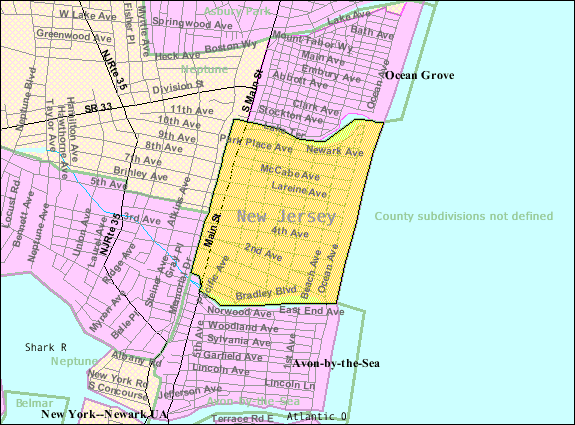
- Census Bureau map of Bradley Beach, New Jersey

- Location in Monmouth County Location in New Jersey Location in the United States
- Coordinates: 40.201604°N 74.012056°W
- Country: United States
- State: New Jersey
- County: Monmouth
- Incorporated: March 13, 1893
- Named for: James A. Bradley

Government
  - Type: Faulkner Act (small municipality)
  - Body: Borough Council
  - Mayor: Alan Gubitosi (term ends December 31, 2028)
  - Administrator: Matthew Doherty (acting)
  - Municipal clerk: Erica Kostyz

Area
  - Total: 0.63 sq mi (1.64 km^{2})
  - Land: 0.61 sq mi (1.58 km^{2})
  - Water: 0.019 sq mi (0.05 km^{2}) 3.33%
  - Rank: 535th of 565 in state 44th of 53 in county
- Elevation: 16 ft (4.9 m)

Population (2020)
  - Total: 4,282
  - Estimate (2023): 4,219
  - Rank: 404th of 565 in state 37th of 53 in county
  - Density: 7,014.4/sq mi (2,708.3/km^{2})
  - Rank: 66th of 565 in state 5th of 53 in county
- Time zone: UTC−05:00 (Eastern (EST))
  - Summer (DST): UTC−04:00 (Eastern (EDT))
- ZIP Code: 07720
- Area code: 732
- FIPS code: 3402506970
- GNIS feature ID: 0885167
- Website: www.bradleybeachnj.gov

Bradley Beach is a borough in Monmouth County, in the U.S. state of New Jersey. As of the 2020 United States census, the borough's population was 4,282, a decrease of 16 (−0.4%) from the 2010 census count of 4,298, which in turn had reflected a decrease of 495 (−10.3%) from the 4,793 counted at the 2000 census. The summer population can reach 30,000.

== History ==
Bradley Beach was named for James A. Bradley, the developer responsible for the creation of the Bradley Beach and Asbury Park. In 1871, William B. Bradner, with James A. Bradley as an investor, acquired 54 acres (22 ha) of land north of Avon-by-the-Sea, and south of Ocean Grove. At the time the area where they had purchased their land was known informally as Ocean Park and was part of Ocean Township and later became part of Neptune Township.

Citizens appealed to the New Jersey Legislature for a referendum to separate Bradley Beach from Neptune Township, and on March 13, 1893, Bradley Beach was incorporated, based on the results of a referendum held on March 6, 1893. The borough's incorporation was confirmed on March 13, 1925.

The borough was the first place in the United States to charge sea bathers for beach access when it began minting its own tin badges starting in 1929. In the mid-20th century, Bradley Beach became known as "Chinatown by the Sea", in reference to the significant number of Chinese people who migrated to the borough from Chinatown, Manhattan.

Sand dunes were constructed on the borough's beaches in 2000 at a cost of $10,000, using snow fences and discarded Christmas trees to build a base of wind-driven sand that rose 15 feet (4.6 m), atop which dune grass was planted. These dunes did little to provide protection from the havoc wreaked by Hurricane Sandy in October 2012. Damage in the borough to beach areas and homes near the shore was more than $3 million, while some neighboring communities that hadn't constructed such dunes also suffered similar damage.

The borough had gone into decline after World War II, with growth returning around 2000 as seasonal visitors and new residents purchased properties, which borough regulations require that they must be renovated on the same footprint as the original home.

== Geography ==
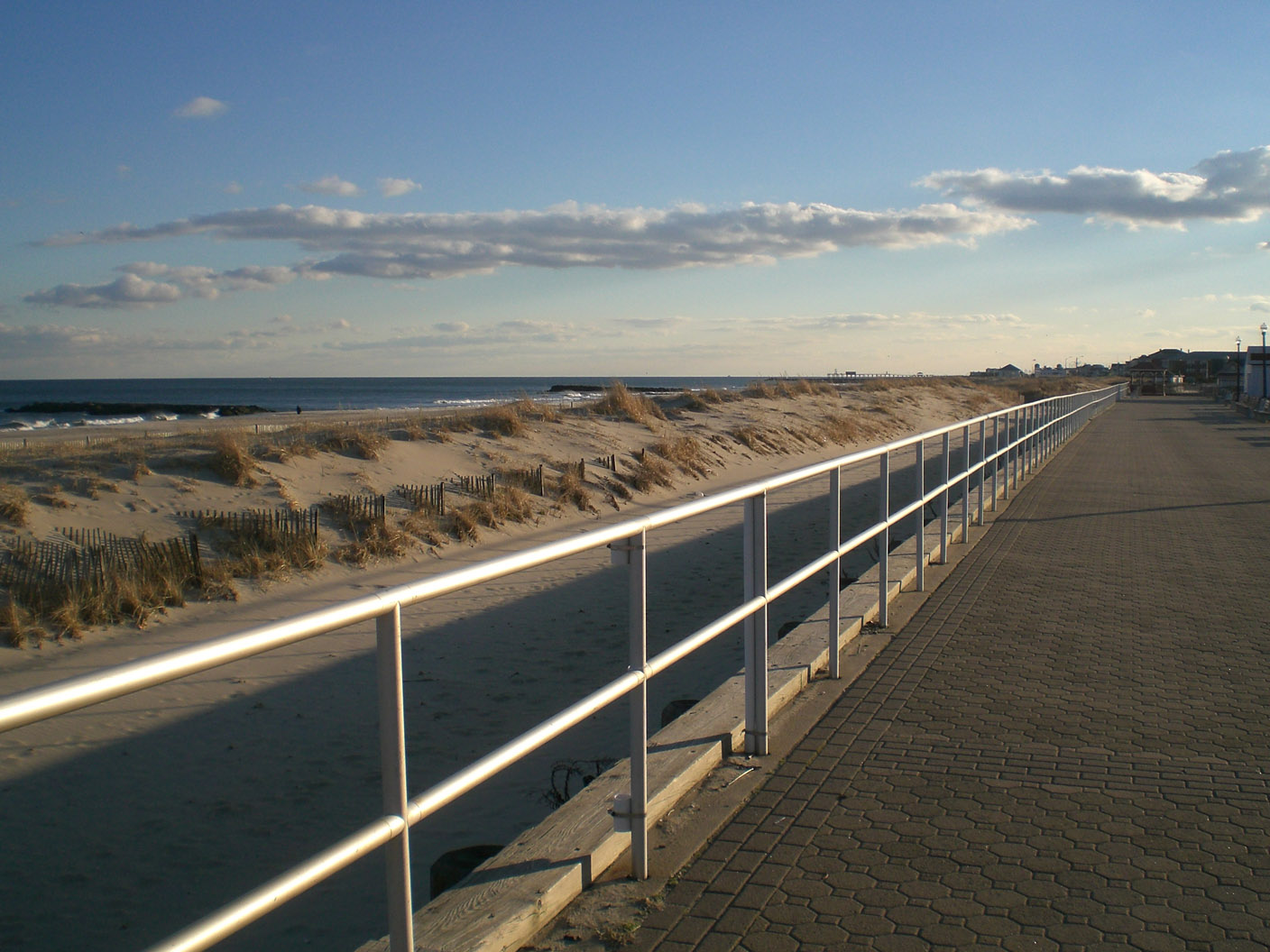
The beach and boardwalk of Bradley Beach

According to the U.S. Census Bureau, the borough had a total area of 0.63 square miles (1.64 km^{2}), including 0.61 square miles (1.58 km^{2}) of land and 0.02 square miles (0.05 km^{2}) of water (3.33%).

The borough borders the Monmouth County municipalities of Avon-by-the-Sea, Neptune City and Neptune Township.

== Demographics ==
Historical population
Census	Pop.	Note	%±
1900	982		—
1910	1,807		84.0%
1920	2,307		27.7%
1930	3,306		43.3%
1940	3,468		4.9%
1950	3,911		12.8%
1960	4,204		7.5%
1970	4,163		−1.0%
1980	4,772		14.6%
1990	4,475		−6.2%
2000	4,793		7.1%
2010	4,298		−10.3%
2020	4,282		−0.4%
2023 (est.)	4,219	▼	−1.5%
Population sources:1900–1920 1900–1910 1910–1930 1940–2000; 2000 2010 2020

=== 2020 census ===
As of the 2020 census, Bradley Beach had a population of 4,282. The median age was 47.7 years. 12.9% of residents were under the age of 18 and 22.1% of residents were 65 years of age or older. For every 100 females there were 92.6 males, and for every 100 females age 18 and over there were 91.0 males age 18 and over.

100.0% of residents lived in urban areas, while 0.0% lived in rural areas.

There were 2,157 households in Bradley Beach, of which 15.0% had children under the age of 18 living in them. Of all households, 32.0% were married-couple households, 26.9% were households with a male householder and no spouse or partner present, and 33.7% were households with a female householder and no spouse or partner present. About 44.8% of all households were made up of individuals and 14.1% had someone living alone who was 65 years of age or older.

There were 3,221 housing units, of which 33.0% were vacant. The homeowner vacancy rate was 0.6% and the rental vacancy rate was 7.5%.

Racial composition as of the 2020 census
Race	Number	Percent
White	3,235	75.5%
Black or African American	84	2.0%
American Indian and Alaska Native	39	0.9%
Asian	57	1.3%
Native Hawaiian and Other Pacific Islander	1	0.0%
Some other race	500	11.7%
Two or more races	366	8.5%
Hispanic or Latino (of any race)	880	20.6%

=== 2010 census ===
The 2010 United States census counted 4,298 people, 2,098 households, and 980 families in the borough. The population density was 7,023.6 per square mile (2,711.8/km^{2}). There were 3,180 housing units at an average density of 5,196.6 per square mile (2,006.4/km^{2}). The racial makeup was 85.06% (3,656) White, 4.96% (213) Black or African American, 0.42% (18) Native American, 1.81% (78) Asian, 0.02% (1) Pacific Islander, 5.21% (224) from other races, and 2.51% (108) from two or more races. Hispanic or Latino of any race were 19.54% (840) of the population.

Of the 2,098 households, 17.0% had children under the age of 18; 32.0% were married couples living together; 10.5% had a female householder with no husband present and 53.3% were non-families. Of all households, 42.2% were made up of individuals and 10.1% had someone living alone who was 65 years of age or older. The average household size was 2.05 and the average family size was 2.80.

14.8% of the population were under the age of 18, 7.2% from 18 to 24, 32.8% from 25 to 44, 31.3% from 45 to 64, and 14.0% who were 65 years of age or older. The median age was 41.5 years. For every 100 females, the population had 98.6 males. For every 100 females ages 18 and older there were 99.9 males.

The Census Bureau's 2006–2010 American Community Survey showed that (in 2010 inflation-adjusted dollars) median household income was $59,792 (with a margin of error of +/− $10,658) and the median family income was $75,575 (+/− $7,930). Males had a median income of $51,250 (+/− $12,410) versus $39,902 (+/− $12,133) for females. The per capita income for the borough was $35,446 (+/− $4,420). About 2.5% of families and 14.1% of the population were below the poverty line, including 5.7% of those under age 18 and 2.9% of those age 65 or over.

=== 2000 census ===
As of the 2000 United States census there were 4,793 people, 2,297 households, and 1,086 families residing in the borough. The population density was 8,097.6 inhabitants per square mile (3,126.5/km^{2}). There were 3,132 housing units at an average density of 5,291.4 per square mile (2,043.0/km^{2}). The racial makeup of the borough was 88.15% White, 3.86% African American, 0.17% Native American, 1.46% Asian, 0.02% Pacific Islander, 4.01% from other races, and 2.34% from two or more races. Hispanic or Latino of any race were 12.83% of the population.

There were 2,297 households, out of which 18.3% had children under the age of 18 living with them, 32.4% were married couples living together, 10.2% had a female householder with no husband present, and 52.7% were non-families. 42.5% of all households were made up of individuals, and 8.3% had someone living alone who was 65 years of age or older. The average household size was 2.09 and the average family size was 2.91.

In the borough the population was spread out, with 18.0% under the age of 18, 8.0% from 18 to 24, 38.6% from 25 to 44, 23.1% from 45 to 64, and 12.3% who were 65 years of age or older. The median age was 37 years. For every 100 females, there were 99.0 males. For every 100 females age 18 and over, there were 98.3 males.

The median income for a household in the borough was $40,878, and the median income for a family was $49,688. Males had a median income of $37,164 versus $31,276 for females. The per capita income for the borough was $25,438. About 5.7% of families and 9.2% of the population were below the poverty line, including 14.9% of those under age 18 and 6.3% of those age 65 or over.

=== Chinese community ===
In the 1920s, ethnic Chinese began to vacation in Bradley Beach. Circa 1941 a woman of Chinese ancestry bought a house in Bradley Beach, and others followed her. Bradley Beach became known as a vacation community for ethnic Chinese. They preferred eating non-Chinese foods while in Bradley Beach. This community became known as "Chinatown by the Sea", and a portion of it was formally recognized as such in 2023. They did not open Chinese businesses in the community as they instead had their businesses in New York City.

== Government ==
=== Local government ===
Bradley Beach has been governed within the Faulkner Act system of New Jersey municipal government under the Small Municipality plan 5, as implemented on July 1, 1992, based on the recommendations of a Charter Study Commission. The borough is one of 18 municipalities (of the 564) statewide that use this form of government, which is only available to municipalities with a population less than 12,000 at the time of adoption. The governing body is comprised of the mayor and the four-member borough council, whose members are elected at-large in nonpartisan elections. The mayor is elected to a four-year term of office and the four council members are chosen to serve three-year terms on a concurrent basis. As of 2010, the borough's nonpartisan elections were shifted from May to the November general election as part of an effort to reduce costs and increase voter participation. The borough had previously operated under the Walsh Act form of New Jersey municipal government starting in 1915, and used a five-member commission, with one member selected to serve as mayor.

As of 2025, the mayor of Bradley Beach is Alan N. Gubitosi, whose term of office ends on December 31, 2028. Members of the Borough Council are Council President Jane DeNoble, Shana Greenblatt (elected to serve an unexpired term), Paul Nowicki and John Weber, all serving concurrent terms ending December 31, 2025.

The five members of a Charter Study Commission began meetings in December 2024 to consider possible changes to the borough's form of government. The commission will report, having been allocated $50,000 for its work. A report will be produced by August and if a charter change is recommended, the voters will make the choice to accept the change as part of the November 2025 general election.

=== Federal, state, and county representation ===
Bradley Beach is located in the 6th Congressional District and is part of New Jersey's 11th state legislative district.

For the 119th United States Congress, New Jersey's 6th congressional district is represented by Frank Pallone (D, Long Branch). New Jersey is represented in the United States Senate by Democrats Cory Booker (Newark, term ends 2027) and Andy Kim (Moorestown, term ends 2031).

For the 2026–2027 session, the 11th legislative district of the New Jersey Legislature is represented in the New Jersey Senate by Vin Gopal (D, Long Branch) and in the General Assembly by Margie Donlon (D, Ocean Township) and Luanne Peterpaul (D, Long Branch).

Monmouth County is governed by a Board of County Commissioners composed of five members who are elected at-large to serve three-year terms of office on a staggered basis, with either one or two seats up for election each year as part of the November general election. At an annual reorganization meeting held in the beginning of January, the board selects one of its members to serve as director and another as deputy director.

As of 2026, Monmouth County's Commissioners are Director Thomas A. Arnone (R, Neptune City, 2028),Deputy Director Nick DiRocco (R, Wall Township, 2028), Susan M. Kiley (R, Hazlet Township, 2027), Erik Anderson (R, Shrewsbury, 2026), and Ross F. Licitra (R, Marlboro Township, 2026).

Constitutional officers elected on a countywide basis are Clerk Christine Giordano Hanlon (R, 2030; Ocean Township), Sheriff Shaun Golden (R, 2028; Howell Township) and Surrogate Maureen Raisch (R, 2026; Middletown Township).

=== Politics ===
United States presidential election results for Bradley Beach
Year	Republican		Democratic		Third party(ies)	
Year	No.	%	No.	%	No.	%
2024	1,004	42.91%	1,283	54.83%	53	2.26%
2020	918	39.59%	1,358	58.56%	43	1.85%
2016	835	43.15%	999	51.63%	101	5.22%
2012	783	42.69%	1,026	55.94%	25	1.36%
2008	814	40.52%	1,152	57.34%	43	2.14%
2004	912	44.08%	1,133	54.76%	24	1.16%
2000	712	36.55%	1,060	54.41%	176	9.03%
1996	561	32.58%	964	55.98%	197	11.44%
1992	763	38.59%	832	42.08%	382	19.32%

As of March 2011, there were a total of 2,514 registered voters in Bradley Beach, of which 763 (30.4%) were registered as Democrats, 468 (18.6%) were registered as Republicans and 1,279 (50.9%) were registered as Unaffiliated. There were 4 voters registered as Libertarians or Greens.

Gubernatorial election results for Bradley Beach
Year	Republican		Democratic		Third party(ies)	
Year	No.	%	No.	%	No.	%
2025	846	41.92%	1,155	57.23%	17	0.84%
2021	761	49.10%	777	50.13%	12	0.77%
2017	547	45.51%	630	52.41%	25	2.08%
2013	784	63.90%	423	34.47%	20	1.63%
2009	667	52.03%	515	40.17%	100	7.80%
2005	575	40.61%	767	54.17%	74	5.23%

In the 2012 presidential election, Democrat Barack Obama received 55.9% of the vote (1,026 cast), ahead of Republican Mitt Romney with 42.7% (783 votes), and other candidates with 1.4% (25 votes), among the 1,856 ballots cast by the borough's 2,681 registered voters (22 ballots were spoiled), for a turnout of 69.2%. In the 2008 presidential election, Democrat Barack Obama received 56.2% of the vote (1,152 cast), ahead of Republican John McCain with 39.7% (814 votes) and other candidates with 2.1% (43 votes), among the 2,050 ballots cast by the borough's 2,803 registered voters, for a turnout of 73.1%. In the 2004 presidential election, Democrat John Kerry received 54.5% of the vote (1,133 ballots cast), outpolling Republican George W. Bush with 43.9% (912 votes) and other candidates with 0.8% (24 votes), among the 2,078 ballots cast by the borough's 2,964 registered voters, for a turnout percentage of 70.1.

In the 2013 gubernatorial election, Republican Chris Christie received 63.9% of the vote (784 cast), ahead of Democrat Barbara Buono with 34.5% (423 votes), and other candidates with 1.6% (20 votes), among the 1,240 ballots cast by the borough's 2,721 registered voters (13 ballots were spoiled), for a turnout of 45.6%. In the 2009 gubernatorial election, Republican Chris Christie received 51.8% of the vote (667 ballots cast), ahead of Democrat Jon Corzine with 40.0% (515 votes), Independent Chris Daggett with 6.8% (87 votes) and other candidates with 1.0% (13 votes), among the 1,287 ballots cast by the borough's 2,641 registered voters, yielding a 48.7% turnout.

United States Senate election results for Bradley Beach1
Year	Republican		Democratic		Third party(ies)	
Year	No.	%	No.	%	No.	%
2024	916	40.16%	1,302	57.08%	63	2.76%
2018	714	43.56%	855	52.17%	70	4.27%
2012	754	44.56%	898	53.07%	40	2.36%
2006	460	39.62%	670	57.71%	31	2.67%

United States Senate election results for Bradley Beach2
Year	Republican		Democratic		Third party(ies)	
Year	No.	%	No.	%	No.	%
2020	931	40.60%	1,295	56.48%	67	2.92%
2014	398	42.12%	516	54.60%	31	3.28%
2013	349	45.62%	408	53.33%	8	1.05%
2008	711	39.77%	999	55.87%	78	4.36%

== Education ==
The Bradley Beach School District serves public school students in pre-kindergarten through eighth grade at Bradley Beach Elementary School. As of the 2020–21 school year, the district, comprised of one school, had an enrollment of 263 students and 37.8 classroom teachers (on an FTE basis), for a student–teacher ratio of 7.0:1.

For public school students in ninth through twelfth grades, the school district maintains sending/receiving relationships with the Asbury Park Public Schools and Neptune Township Schools under which 93% of Bradley Beach students are sent to Asbury Park High School and the other 7% are sent to Neptune High School. As of the 2020–21 school year, Asbury Park High school had an enrollment of 682 students and 54.5 classroom teachers (on an FTE basis), for a student–teacher ratio of 12.5:1 and Neptune High School had an enrollment of 1,270 students and 115.0 classroom teachers (on an FTE basis), for a student–teacher ratio of 11.0:1.

An application program with Red Bank Regional High School or the schools in the Monmouth County Vocational School District are alternatives available for students from the borough attending public high school.

Public school students also have the option to attend Academy Charter High School in Lake Como, which accepts students on a lottery basis from the communities of Allenhurst, Asbury Park, Avon-by-the-Sea, Belmar, Bradley Beach, Deal, Interlaken and Lake Como.

Public high school students may also apply to attend one of the magnet schools in the Monmouth County Vocational School District—Marine Academy of Science and Technology, Academy of Allied Health & Science, High Technology High School, Biotechnology High School, and Communications High School.

The Bradley Beach Public Library is located at 511 Fourth Avenue, on the corner of Fourth Avenue and Hammond Avenue. In early 2017, a building expansion was added to the south elevation of the circa 1927 built library building. The structural design was performed by the Structural Engineering department of French Parrello Associates (FPA). There are many activities at the library for people of all ages including various story times, a writing group and weekly Overeaters Anonymous meetings. In the spring of 2014 the library introduced a book bike which a librarian or volunteer rides around town and on the boardwalk to give books and to tell residents about the opportunities and activities coming up at the library and around the borough.

== Transportation ==
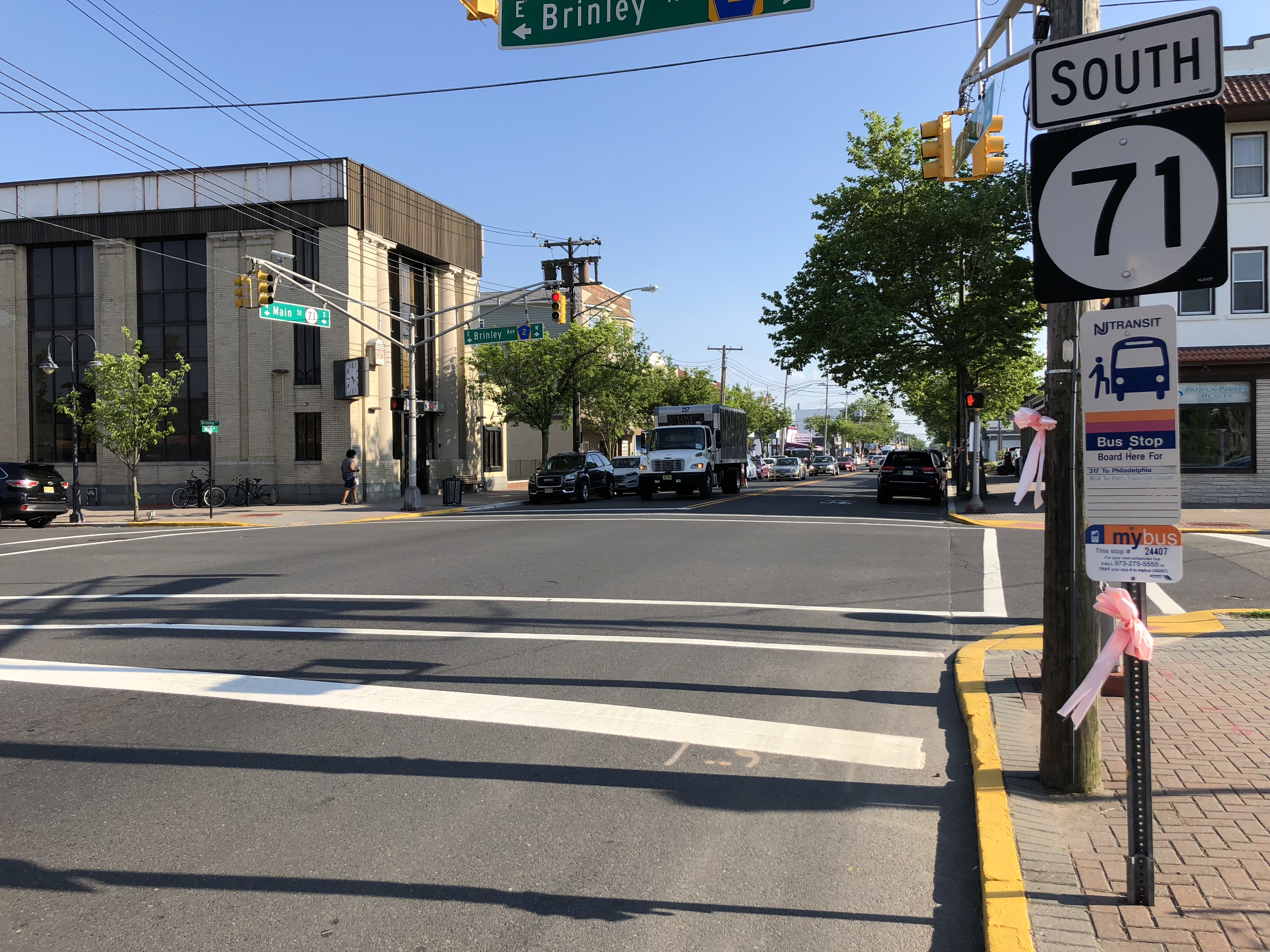
Route 71 (Main Street), the main highway in Bradley Beach

=== Roads and highways ===
As of May 2010, the borough had a total of 14.31 miles (23.03 km) of roadways, of which 10.90 miles (17.54 km) were maintained by the municipality, 2.56 miles (4.12 km) by Monmouth County and 0.85 miles (1.37 km) by the New Jersey Department of Transportation.

Route 71 (Main Street) is the main road that runs through the town. Route 18 is in neighboring Neptune Township, and both the Garden State Parkway and Interstate 195 are within a 10 to 15 minute drive.

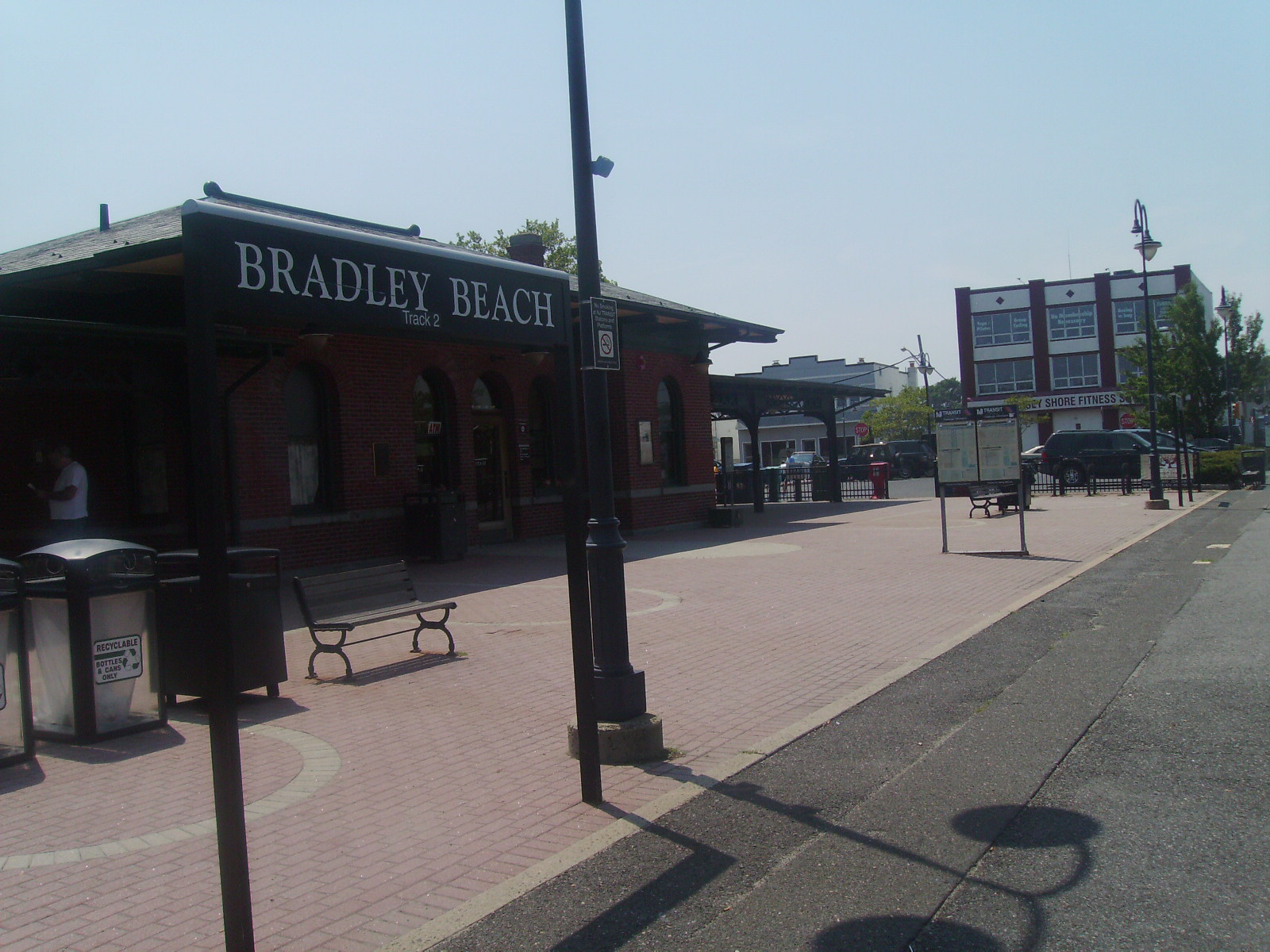
Bradley Beach station, which is served by NJ Transit's North Jersey Coast Line

=== Public transportation ===
NJ Transit provides rail service at the Bradley Beach station. Commuter service connects the borough to Hoboken Terminal, Newark Penn Station, Secaucus Junction and New York Penn Station on the North Jersey Coast Line.

NJ Transit bus service is available between the borough and Philadelphia on the 317 route, with local service offered on the 830 route.

== Climate ==
According to the Köppen climate classification system, Bradley Beach has a humid subtropical climate (Cfa). Cfa climates are characterized by all months having an average temperature above 32.0 °F (0.0 °C), at least four months with an average temperature greater than or equal 50.0 °F (10.0 °C), at least one month with an average temperature greater than or equal 71.6 °F (22.0 °C) and no significant precipitation difference between seasons. Although most summer days are slightly humid with a cooling afternoon sea breeze in Bradley Beach, episodes of heat and high humidity can occur with heat index values greater than 103 °F (39 °C). Since 1981, the highest air temperature was 100.3 °F (37.9 °C) on August 9, 2001, and the highest daily average mean dew point was 77.3 °F (25.2 °C) on August 13, 2016. The average wettest month is July which correlates with the peak in thunderstorm activity. Since 1981, the wettest calendar day was 5.60 inches (142 mm) on August 27, 2011. During the winter months, the average annual extreme minimum air temperature is 3.8 °F (−15.7 °C). Since 1981, the coldest air temperature was −5.7 °F (−20.9 °C) on January 22, 1984. Episodes of extreme cold and wind can occur with wind chill values below −6 °F (−21 °C). The average seasonal (November–April) snowfall total is 18 to 24 inches (46 to 61 cm) and the average snowiest month is February which corresponds with the annual peak in nor'easter activity.

Climate data for Bradley Beach, 1981–2010 normals, extremes 1981–2019
Month	Jan	Feb	Mar	Apr	May	Jun	Jul	Aug	Sep	Oct	Nov	Dec	Year
Record high °F (°C)	71.6 (22.0)	78.8 (26.0)	82.1 (27.8)	88.9 (31.6)	94.9 (34.9)	96.8 (36.0)	99.8 (37.7)	100.3 (37.9)	97.5 (36.4)	93.9 (34.4)	80.6 (27.0)	75.0 (23.9)	100.3 (37.9)
Mean daily maximum °F (°C)	40.1 (4.5)	42.7 (5.9)	49.2 (9.6)	58.7 (14.8)	68.2 (20.1)	77.5 (25.3)	82.8 (28.2)	81.7 (27.6)	75.5 (24.2)	65.1 (18.4)	55.3 (12.9)	45.2 (7.3)	61.9 (16.6)
Daily mean °F (°C)	32.4 (0.2)	34.8 (1.6)	40.9 (4.9)	50.3 (10.2)	59.9 (15.5)	69.4 (20.8)	74.9 (23.8)	73.9 (23.3)	67.3 (19.6)	56.4 (13.6)	47.3 (8.5)	37.7 (3.2)	53.9 (12.2)
Mean daily minimum °F (°C)	24.8 (−4.0)	26.8 (−2.9)	32.7 (0.4)	41.9 (5.5)	51.5 (10.8)	61.2 (16.2)	67.0 (19.4)	66.0 (18.9)	59.1 (15.1)	47.6 (8.7)	39.2 (4.0)	30.1 (−1.1)	45.7 (7.6)
Record low °F (°C)	−5.7 (−20.9)	1.0 (−17.2)	6.0 (−14.4)	18.3 (−7.6)	35.5 (1.9)	44.9 (7.2)	49.0 (9.4)	45.5 (7.5)	39.5 (4.2)	26.8 (−2.9)	15.1 (−9.4)	−0.1 (−17.8)	−5.7 (−20.9)
Average precipitation inches (mm)	3.62 (92)	3.07 (78)	3.97 (101)	4.12 (105)	3.75 (95)	3.61 (92)	4.70 (119)	4.66 (118)	3.59 (91)	3.90 (99)	3.88 (99)	4.02 (102)	46.89 (1,191)
Average relative humidity (%)	64.6	61.7	60.3	61.8	65.7	70.0	69.6	71.2	71.3	69.4	67.3	65.3	66.5
Average dew point °F (°C)	21.8 (−5.7)	23.0 (−5.0)	28.2 (−2.1)	37.7 (3.2)	48.4 (9.1)	59.2 (15.1)	64.3 (17.9)	64.0 (17.8)	57.7 (14.3)	46.5 (8.1)	37.0 (2.8)	27.1 (−2.7)	43.0 (6.1)
Source: PRISM

Climate data for Sandy Hook, NJ Ocean Water Temperature (18 N Bradley Beach)
Month	Jan	Feb	Mar	Apr	May	Jun	Jul	Aug	Sep	Oct	Nov	Dec	Year
Daily mean °F (°C)	37 (3)	36 (2)	40 (4)	46 (8)	55 (13)	62 (17)	69 (21)	72 (22)	68 (20)	59 (15)	51 (11)	43 (6)	53 (12)
Source: NOAA

== Ecology ==
According to the A. W. Kuchler U.S. potential natural vegetation types, Bradley Beach would have a dominant vegetation type of Appalachian Oak (104) with a dominant vegetation form of Eastern Hardwood Forest (25). The plant hardiness zone is 7a with an average annual extreme minimum air temperature of 3.8 °F (−15.7 °C). The average date of first spring leaf-out is March 24 and fall color typically peaks in early-November.

== Chess ==
In 1929, Bradley Beach hosted an international chess tournament at Hotel La Reine. Alexander Alekhine, the reigning world chess champion at the time, won the tournament with an impressive score of 8.5/9.

== Notable people ==
People who were born in, residents of, or otherwise closely associated with Bradley Beach include:

- James A. Bradley (1830–1921), New Jersey State Senator, philanthropist and real estate developer, who developed Asbury Park and was the namesake of Bradley Beach
- Linda Deutsch (1943–2024), journalist who worked for the Associated Press
- TJ Lubinsky (born 1972), radio host
- James D. Melville Jr. (born 1957), diplomat who served as the United States Ambassador to Estonia
- Jeannette Mirsky (1903–1987), author who was awarded a Guggenheim Fellowship in 1947 for her biographical writings on the history of exploration
- Pat Pacillo (born 1963), former Major League Baseball player who pitched for the Cincinnati Reds in 1987 and 1988
- Christine Quinn (born 1966), Speaker of the New York City Council
- Cesar Romero (1907–1994), actor
- Philip Roth (1933–2018), author of Goodbye, Columbus and Portnoy's Complaint
- Isaac Schlossbach (1891–1984), polar explorer, submariner and aviation pioneer
- Bruce Springsteen (born 1949), musician
- Thomas Vezzetti (1928–1988), 33rd Mayor of Hoboken, New Jersey
- Tommy West (1942–2021, born as Thomas Picardo), singer-songwriter and record producer
- Murray A. Wiener (born 1909), polar explorer

Preceded by Ocean Grove	Beaches of New Jersey	Succeeded by Avon-by-the-Sea
