= Neptune City, New Jersey =

Borough in Monmouth County, New Jersey, US

- Borough
- Borough of Neptune City
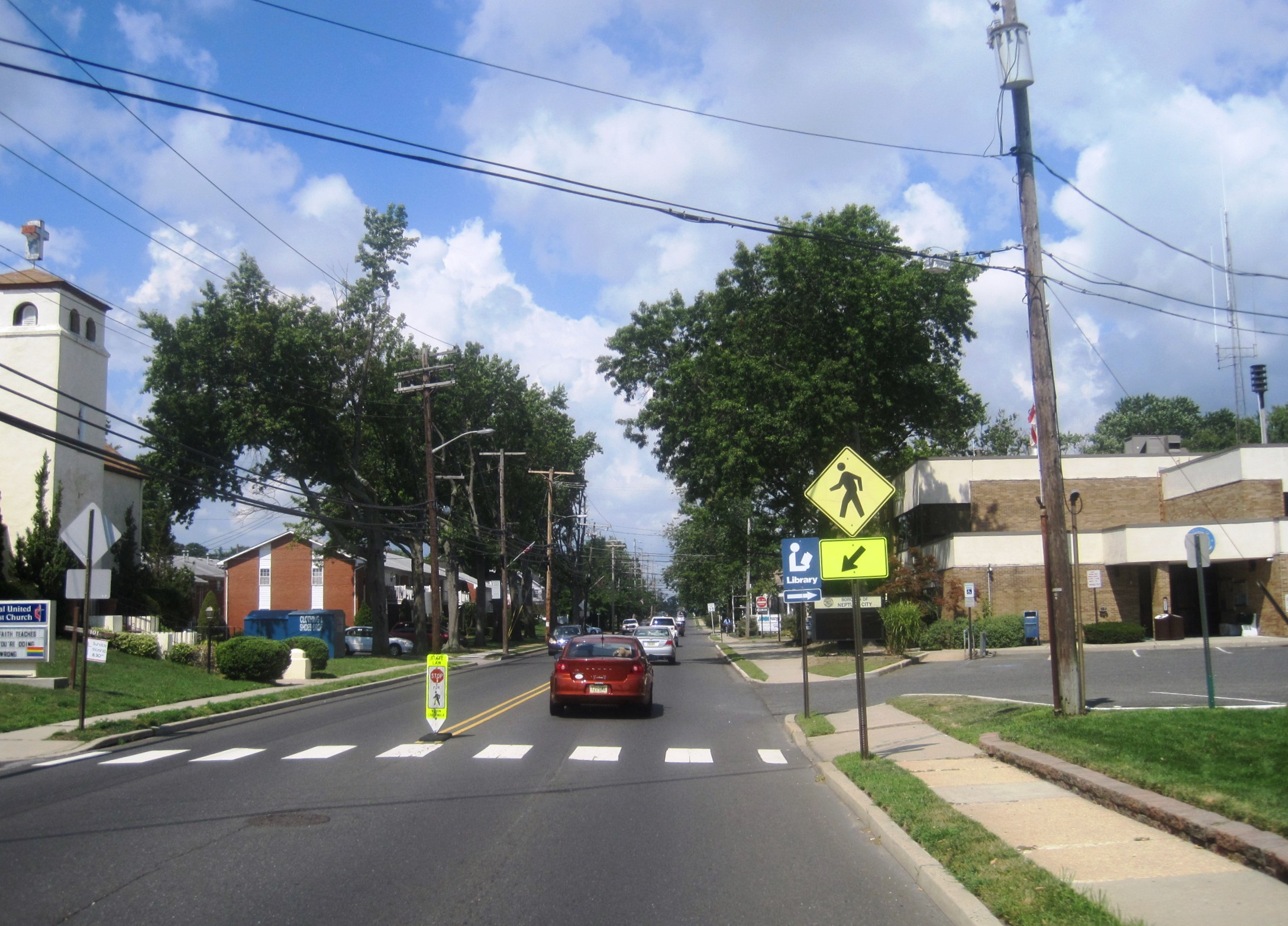
- Center of Neptune City along Sylvania Avenue

- Seal

- Location of Neptune City in Monmouth County highlighted in red (left). Inset map: Location of Monmouth County in New Jersey highlighted in orange (right)

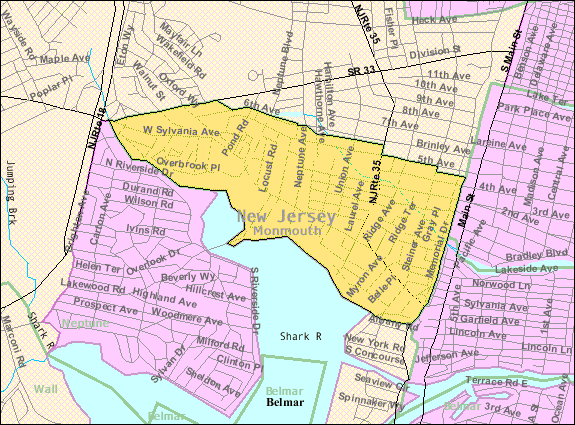
- Census Bureau map of Neptune City, New Jersey

- Location in Monmouth County Location in New Jersey Location in the United States
- Coordinates: 40.200539°N 74.032896°W
- Country: United States
- State: New Jersey
- County: Monmouth
- Incorporated: October 4, 1881
- Named for: Neptune, Roman water deity

Government
  - Type: Borough
  - Body: Borough Council
  - Mayor: Rachel McGreevy (D, term ends December 31, 2027)
  - Administrator: Al Jardine
  - Municipal clerk: Corinne Dicorcia Williams

Area
  - Total: 0.90 sq mi (2.32 km^{2})
  - Land: 0.90 sq mi (2.32 km^{2})
  - Water: 0 sq mi (0.00 km^{2}) 0.00%
  - Rank: 516th of 565 in state 43rd of 53 in county
- Elevation: 23 ft (7.0 m)

Population (2020)
  - Total: 4,626
  - Estimate (2023): 4,581
  - Rank: 391st of 565 in state 34th of 53 in county
  - Density: 5,162.1/sq mi (1,993.1/km^{2})
  - Rank: 111th of 565 in state 12th of 53 in county
- Time zone: UTC−05:00 (Eastern (EST))
  - Summer (DST): UTC−04:00 (Eastern (EDT))
- ZIP Code: 07753
- Area code: 732
- FIPS code: 3402549920
- GNIS feature ID: 0885315
- Website: www.neptunecitynj.com

Neptune City is a borough in Monmouth County, in the U.S. state of New Jersey. As of the 2020 United States census, the borough's population was 4,626, a decrease of 244 (−5.0%) from the 2010 census count of 4,869, which in turn reflected a decline of 349 (−6.7%) from the 5,218 counted in the 2000 census.

The Borough of Neptune City was incorporated on October 4, 1881, based on a referendum held on March 19, 1881. The boundaries included all of present-day Neptune City, along with what is now Avon-by-the-Sea and the southern portion of Bradley Beach. On March 23, 1900, a bill approved in the New Jersey Legislature created the Borough of Avon-by-the-Sea. On March 13, 1907, the eastern portion of Neptune City was annexed to the Borough of Bradley Beach. The borough was named for Neptune, the Roman water deity, and its location on the Atlantic Ocean.

The earliest borough hall was erected in 1902 at the northwest corner of Evergreen Avenue and Railroad Avenue (now Memorial Drive).

== Geography ==
According to the United States Census Bureau, the borough had a total area of 0.90 square miles (2.32 km^{2}), all of which was land.

Unincorporated communities, localities and place names located partially or completely within the township include Neptune Heights and Ocean Grove Heights.

The borough borders the Monmouth County municipalities of Avon-by-the-Sea, Bradley Beach and Neptune Township.

== Demographics ==
Historical population
Census	Pop.	Note	%±
1900	1,009	*	—
1910	488	*	−51.6%
1920	539		10.5%
1930	2,258		318.9%
1940	2,392		5.9%
1950	3,073		28.5%
1960	4,013		30.6%
1970	5,502		37.1%
1980	5,276		−4.1%
1990	4,997		−5.3%
2000	5,218		4.4%
2010	4,869		−6.7%
2020	4,626		−5.0%
2023 (est.)	4,581	▼	−1.0%
Population sources: 1900–1920; 1900–1910 1910–1930; 1940–2000 2000; 2010 2020 * = Lost territory in previous decade.

=== 2020 census ===
As of the 2020 census, Neptune City had a population of 4,626. The median age was 46.3 years. 14.8% of residents were under the age of 18 and 19.2% of residents were 65 years of age or older. For every 100 females there were 93.4 males, and for every 100 females age 18 and over there were 91.4 males age 18 and over.

100.0% of residents lived in urban areas, while 0.0% lived in rural areas.

There were 2,109 households in Neptune City, of which 19.4% had children under the age of 18 living in them. Of all households, 35.4% were married-couple households, 23.5% were households with a male householder and no spouse or partner present, and 33.0% were households with a female householder and no spouse or partner present. About 36.7% of all households were made up of individuals and 14.9% had someone living alone who was 65 years of age or older.

There were 2,251 housing units, of which 6.3% were vacant. The homeowner vacancy rate was 1.0% and the rental vacancy rate was 4.4%.

Racial composition as of the 2020 census
Race	Number	Percent
White	3,132	67.7%
Black or African American	657	14.2%
American Indian and Alaska Native	17	0.4%
Asian	95	2.1%
Native Hawaiian and Other Pacific Islander	0	0.0%
Some other race	319	6.9%
Two or more races	406	8.8%
Hispanic or Latino (of any race)	644	13.9%

=== 2010 census ===
The 2010 United States census counted 4,869 people, 2,133 households, and 1,220 families in the borough. The population density was 5,105.0 per square mile (1,971.1/km^{2}). There were 2,312 housing units at an average density of 2,424.0 per square mile (935.9/km^{2}). The racial makeup was 78.00% (3,798) White, 10.62% (517) Black or African American, 0.23% (11) Native American, 4.46% (217) Asian, 0.02% (1) Pacific Islander, 3.88% (189) from other races, and 2.79% (136) from two or more races. Hispanic or Latino of any race were 10.08% (491) of the population.

Of the 2,133 households, 22.4% had children under the age of 18; 38.8% were married couples living together; 13.2% had a female householder with no husband present and 42.8% were non-families. Of all households, 35.8% were made up of individuals and 11.1% had someone living alone who was 65 years of age or older. The average household size was 2.24 and the average family size was 2.95.

18.4% of the population were under the age of 18, 7.1% from 18 to 24, 27.4% from 25 to 44, 31.7% from 45 to 64, and 15.3% who were 65 years of age or older. The median age was 43.1 years. For every 100 females, the population had 89.5 males. For every 100 females ages 18 and older there were 86.9 males.

The Census Bureau's 2006–2010 American Community Survey showed that (in 2010 inflation-adjusted dollars) median household income was $50,154 (with a margin of error of +/− $14,050) and the median family income was $72,313 (+/− $16,796). Males had a median income of $48,257 (+/− $3,972) versus $43,365 (+/− $7,250) for females. The per capita income for the borough was $31,172 (+/− $2,830). About 3.0% of families and 5.9% of the population were below the poverty line, including 6.7% of those under age 18 and 5.5% of those age 65 or over.

=== 2000 census ===
As of the 2000 United States census there were 5,218 people, 2,221 households, and 1,330 families residing in the borough. The population density was 5,742.8 inhabitants per square mile (2,217.3/km^{2}). There were 2,342 housing units at an average density of 2,577.5 per square mile (995.2/km^{2}). The racial makeup of the borough was 83.38% White, 9.52% African American, 0.23% Native American, 2.72% Asian, 2.11% from other races, and 2.03% from two or more races. Hispanic or Latino of any race were 5.31% of the population.

There were 2,221 households, out of which 25.5% had children under the age of 18 living with them, 42.0% were married couples living together, 13.5% had a female householder with no husband present, and 40.1% were non-families. 33.5% of all households were made up of individuals, and 11.7% had someone living alone who was 65 years of age or older. The average household size was 2.29 and the average family size was 2.96.

In the borough the population was spread out, with 21.5% under the age of 18, 6.5% from 18 to 24, 31.7% from 25 to 44, 24.0% from 45 to 64, and 16.4% who were 65 years of age or older. The median age was 40 years. For every 100 females, there were 87.6 males. For every 100 females age 18 and over, there were 83.2 males.

The median income for a household in the borough was $43,451, and the median income for a family was $46,393. Males had a median income of $39,578 versus $34,044 for females. The per capita income for the borough was $22,191. About 5.0% of families and 5.5% of the population were below the poverty line, including 5.8% of those under age 18 and 8.3% of those age 65 or over.

== Parks and recreation ==
The Neptune City Community Center offers a recreation center with a gym, game room, exercise room, computer room, TV room and a special occasion room.

Neptune City has four parks: Memorial Park, located along the Shark River; Laird Avenue Park, the first playground built in Neptune City; Joe Freda Park, located on Third Avenue; and Adams Field, located on West Sylvania Avenue.

== Government ==
=== Local government ===
Neptune City is governed under the borough form of New Jersey municipal government, which is used in 218 municipalities (of the 564) statewide, making it the most common form of government in New Jersey. The governing body is comprised of the mayor and the borough council, with all positions elected at-large on a partisan basis as part of the November general election. A mayor is elected directly by the voters to a four-year term of office. The borough council includes six members elected to serve three-year terms on a staggered basis, with two seats coming up for election each year in a three-year cycle. The borough form of government used by Neptune City is a "weak mayor / strong council" government in which council members act as the legislative body with the mayor presiding at meetings and voting only in the event of a tie. The mayor can veto ordinances subject to an override by a two-thirds majority vote of the council. The mayor makes committee and liaison assignments for council members, and most appointments are made by the mayor with the advice and consent of the council.

As of 2025, the mayor of the Borough of Neptune City is Democrat Rachel McGreevy, whose term of office ends December 31, 2027. Members of the Neptune City Borough Council are Council President Glen Kocsis (D, 2026), Kimberly Karalovich (D, 2027), Gail L. Oliver (D, 2027), Danielle Pappas (R, 2025), Pamela Renee (D, 2026) and Brian J. Thomas (R, 2025).

With Republican Richard Pryor and Democrat Michael Skudera tied at 602 votes after the November 2015 general election for the second of two seats, the two candidates faced off in a March 2016 special election, won by Pryor by a 511–478 margin.

=== Federal, state, and county representation ===
Neptune City is located in the 6th Congressional District and is part of New Jersey's 11th state legislative district.

For the 119th United States Congress, New Jersey's 6th congressional district is represented by Frank Pallone (D, Long Branch). New Jersey is represented in the United States Senate by Democrats Cory Booker (Newark, term ends 2027) and Andy Kim (Moorestown, term ends 2031).

For the 2026–2027 session, the 11th legislative district of the New Jersey Legislature is represented in the New Jersey Senate by Vin Gopal (D, Long Branch) and in the General Assembly by Margie Donlon (D, Ocean Township) and Luanne Peterpaul (D, Long Branch).

Monmouth County is governed by a Board of County Commissioners composed of five members who are elected at-large to serve three-year terms of office on a staggered basis, with either one or two seats up for election each year as part of the November general election. At an annual reorganization meeting held in the beginning of January, the board selects one of its members to serve as director and another as deputy director.

As of 2025, Monmouth County's Commissioners are Director Thomas A. Arnone (R, Neptune City, 2025), Susan M. Kiley (R, Hazlet Township, 2027), Erik Anderson (R, Shrewsbury, 2026), Nick DiRocco (R, Wall Township, 2025), and Deputy Director Ross F. Licitra (R, Marlboro Township, 2026).

Constitutional officers elected on a countywide basis are Clerk Christine Giordano Hanlon (R, 2025; Ocean Township), Sheriff Shaun Golden (R, 2025; Howell Township) and Surrogate Rosemarie D. Peters (R, 2026; Middletown Township).

=== Politics ===
United States presidential election results for Neptune City
Year	Republican		Democratic		Third party(ies)	
Year	No.	%	No.	%	No.	%
2024	1,151	45.05%	1,356	53.07%	48	1.88%
2020	1,188	43.97%	1,481	54.81%	33	1.22%
2016	1,201	49.08%	1,159	47.36%	87	3.56%
2012	897	42.19%	1,183	55.64%	46	2.16%
2008	1,040	43.86%	1,212	51.12%	119	5.02%
2004	1,185	52.93%	1,031	46.05%	23	1.03%
2000	871	44.15%	1,009	51.14%	93	4.71%
1996	626	34.84%	955	53.14%	216	12.02%
1992	797	37.16%	906	42.24%	442	20.61%

As of March 2011, there were a total of 2,967 registered voters in Neptune City, of which 715 (24.1%) were registered as Democrats, 809 (27.3%) were registered as Republicans and 1,443 (48.6%) were registered as Unaffiliated. There were no voters registered to other parties.

Gubernatorial election results for Neptune City
Year	Republican		Democratic		Third party(ies)	
Year	No.	%	No.	%	No.	%
2025	895	42.95%	1,169	56.09%	20	0.96%
2021	858	49.85%	839	48.75%	24	1.39%
2017	738	47.52%	764	49.20%	51	3.28%
2013	898	66.57%	432	32.02%	19	1.41%
2009	841	56.18%	530	35.40%	126	8.42%
2005	644	45.87%	674	48.01%	86	6.13%

In the 2012 presidential election, Democrat Barack Obama received 55.6% of the vote (1,183 cast), ahead of Republican Mitt Romney with 42.2% (897 votes), and other candidates with 2.2% (46 votes), among the 2,147 ballots cast by the borough's 3,211 registered voters (21 ballots were spoiled), for a turnout of 66.9%. In the 2008 presidential election, Democrat Barack Obama received 49.4% of the vote (1,212 cast), ahead of Republican John McCain with 42.4% (1,040 votes) and other candidates with 4.9% (119 votes), among the 2,451 ballots cast by the borough's 3,195 registered voters, for a turnout of 76.7%. In the 2004 presidential election, Republican George W. Bush received 52.8% of the vote (1,185 ballots cast), outpolling Democrat John Kerry with 45.9% (1,031 votes) and other candidates with 0.7% (23 votes), among the 2,245 ballots cast by the borough's 3,106 registered voters, for a turnout percentage of 72.3.

In the 2013 gubernatorial election, Republican Chris Christie received 66.6% of the vote (898 cast), ahead of Democrat Barbara Buono with 32.0% (432 votes), and other candidates with 1.4% (19 votes), among the 1,373 ballots cast by the borough's 3,247 registered voters (24 ballots were spoiled), for a turnout of 42.3%. In the 2009 gubernatorial election, Republican Chris Christie received 56.0% of the vote (841 ballots cast), ahead of Democrat Jon Corzine with 35.3% (530 votes), Independent Chris Daggett with 7.1% (106 votes) and other candidates with 1.3% (20 votes), among the 1,501 ballots cast by the borough's 3,032 registered voters, yielding a 49.5% turnout.

United States Senate election results for Neptune City1
Year	Republican		Democratic		Third party(ies)	
Year	No.	%	No.	%	No.	%
2024	1,051	43.45%	1,306	53.99%	62	2.56%
2018	936	49.37%	874	46.10%	86	4.54%
2012	874	44.21%	1,061	53.67%	42	2.12%
2006	623	48.44%	623	48.44%	40	3.11%

United States Senate election results for Neptune City2
Year	Republican		Democratic		Third party(ies)	
Year	No.	%	No.	%	No.	%
2020	1,145	43.11%	1,446	54.44%	65	2.45%
2014	622	46.45%	688	51.38%	29	2.17%
2013	402	48.32%	417	50.12%	13	1.56%
2008	912	43.74%	1,107	53.09%	66	3.17%

== Education ==
The Neptune City School District serves students in kindergarten through eighth grade at Woodrow Wilson School. As of the 2021–22 school year, the district, comprised of one school, had an enrollment of 248 students and 29.0 classroom teachers (on an FTE basis), for a student–teacher ratio of 8.6:1. Before Woodrow Wilson School was constructed, students attended Roosevelt School on Third Avenue, which was demolished after being deemed beyond repair and became the site of Joe Freda Park.

Public school students in ninth through twelfth grades attend Neptune High School as part of a sending/receiving relationship with the Neptune Township Schools; in a study published in May 2015, the district looked at modifying its relationship with the Neptune Township district, considering leaving the agreement unchanged, adding students in grades 6–8 to the sending arrangement or a regionalization of the two districts. As of the 2021–22 school year, the high school had an enrollment of 1,212 students and 97.0 classroom teachers (on an FTE basis), for a student–teacher ratio of 12.5:1.

The district also provides students with the opportunities to attend other high schools, such as the schools of the Monmouth County Vocational School District Academies which include: the Marine Academy of Science and Technology (MAST) located on Sandy Hook, High Technology High School located on the campus of Brookdale Community College in Lincroft, the Academy of Allied Health & Science in Neptune Township and affiliated with the Jersey Shore University Medical Center, the Communications High School located on the property of Wall High School, and Biotechnology High School located in Freehold Township. Neptune City also provides the students with the opportunity to attend the Performing Arts Program at Red Bank Regional High School for Performing Arts in Little Silver or to the Academy of Information Technology and the Academy of Finance both located at the Red Bank Regional High School for Performing Arts.

== Landmarks ==
Steiner and Son's Pajama Factory was the first factory built in Neptune City, constructed in 1891 on land donated by James A. Bradley. Immanuel Steiner was a silk dealer in Austria when he emigrated to New York City in the late 1860s. He began manufacturing pajamas and nightgowns in New York City shortly thereafter. With his sons Edwin and Clarence, they sought to expand operations, opting to construct the flagship factory at the corner of Fourth and Railroad Avenue (now Memorial Drive.) The construction costs were $17,590 and the brickwork was carried out by A.A. Taylor of Asbury Park. Their flagship product, "The Universal Nightshirt" became enormously popular throughout the country. Within two years time, they constructed another nearly identical factory three blocks north (since the 1930s this has been the home of The SS Adams Novelty Company). Their first national slogan was "We Put the World To Sleep".

By 1918, Steiner and Sons had nearly 2,000 employees in factories in Neptune City, Neptune, Asbury Park, Long Branch, Keyport, Freehold, Manasquan and Toms River. They built a baseball park on the land between the two factories on Fourth and Seventh Avenues. In the spring of 1922, Babe Ruth and other members of the New York Yankees played an exhibition game there. Edwin Steiner assumed control at his father's death, and he expanded the original building considerably. The Steiner corporation had a reputation for spotlessly clean working conditions, and the quality of their products is attested to in countless period advertisements stretching all the way to California.

The first ever murder in Neptune City occurred in 1929, as part of a payroll robbery. George Danielson, a 65-year-old courier from the First National Bank in Bradley Beach was shot point-blank at the employee entrance on 4th Avenue. The bandits got away with the payroll of $7,280 and were later caught and tried.

In the late 1920s, the Steiner corporation purchased and merged with the Liberty Nightshirt Company, headquartered in Baltimore. The decline in demand for nightshirts was one of the reasons for the acquisition. The same circumstances forced the company to shutter most of their other area operations. Tax squabbles with the Borough of Neptune City led them to close their long-time headquarters in Neptune City in 1939 and move to Shrewsbury, Pennsylvania. They eventually went out of business.

Mario Mirabelli and his brother Michael were running a military clothing manufacturing outfit in Elizabeth at the time when they purchased the building in 1940. They expanded their operations and won considerable government contracts during the Second World War. They produced close to $11 million worth of military clothing during the war. The Mirabelli Company continued to win military contracts after the war. Mario Mirabelli was called to testify before Congress in the late 1950s when government suppliers were accused of forcing the company to manufacture items using second-rate materials that were deemed unusable by other government manufacturing outfits. The scandal hurt Mirabelli's business and reputation. They continued to win small government contracts until the early 1960s, but eventually sold the building and went out of business.

Flea markets were held on the first floor in the late 1960s and early 1970s. Outerama, a company founded by Zenek Lapinsky in the late 1960s, continued to manufacture suits and jackets in the building until 1975 on the second and third floors. The bankruptcy of many of Outerama's clients led to the company's demise. The building was shuttered in 1976 and remained so for the next 25 years.

For nearly 20 years, the Borough of Neptune City sought to have the property revamped. In the early 1990s plans were underway to convert the building to retail shops and apartments, but funding was short, and the borough foreclosed on the owners before they could realize their goal. In 2000, the building was razed and condominiums were constructed. A demolition crane was destroyed when it fell into the side of the building during the wrecking operations.

The one and only motel in the Borough of Neptune City was the Charline Motel, located on Steiner Avenue.

== Transportation ==
=== Roads and highways ===
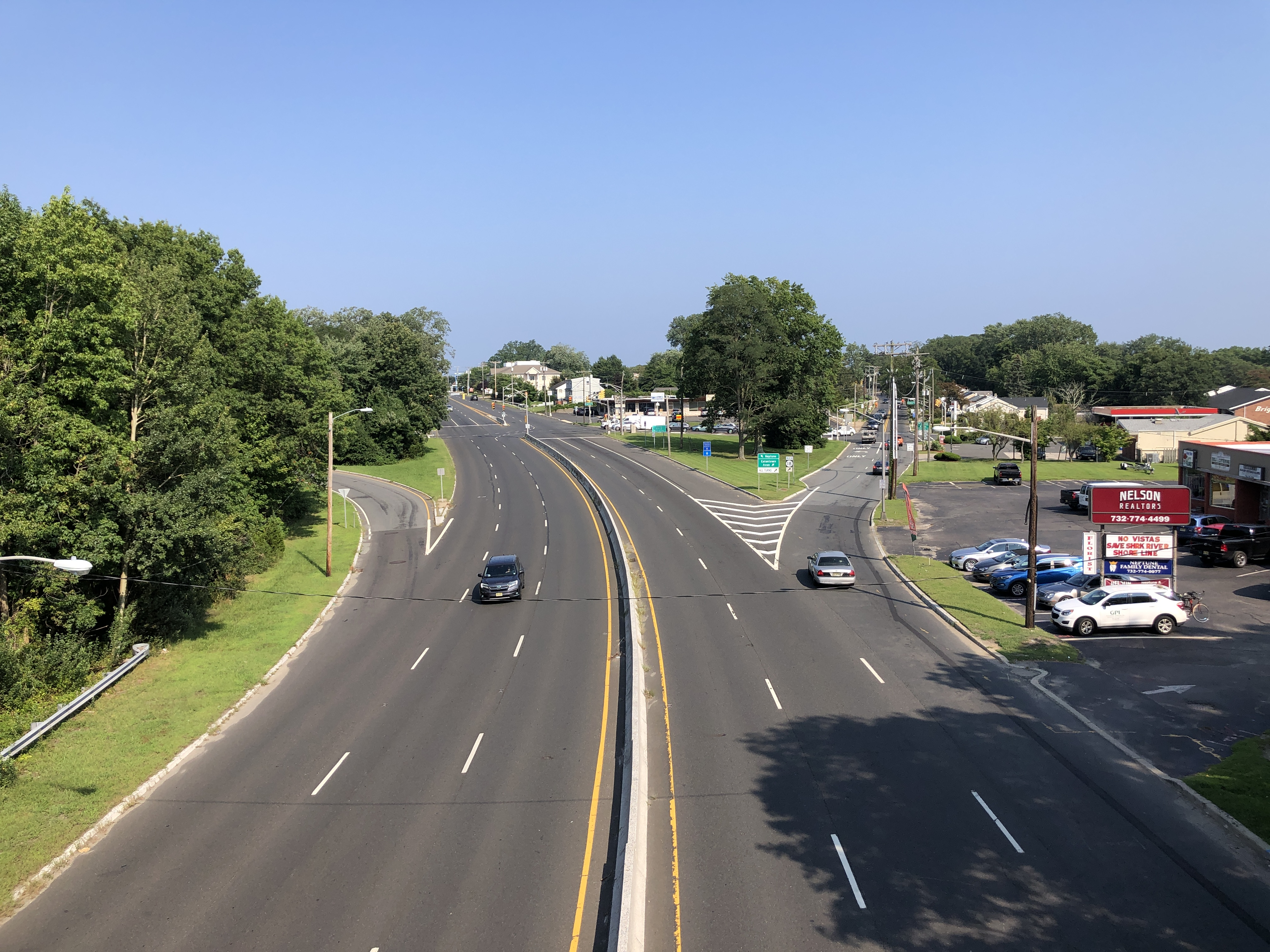
Route 33 eastbound along the northern border of Neptune City, viewed from Route 18

As of May 2010, the borough had a total of 18.76 miles (30.19 km) of roadways, of which 14.12 miles (22.72 km) were maintained by the municipality, 3.43 miles (5.52 km) by Monmouth County and 1.21 miles (1.95 km) by the New Jersey Department of Transportation.

Route 35 passes directly through Neptune City, while Route 33 runs along the northern border of the borough. The Route 18 freeway is immediately west of the city, and both Interstate 195 and the Garden State Parkway are close by.

=== Public transportation ===
NJ Transit offers local bus service on the 836 route. Train service is available at the Bradley Beach station. Commuter service runs between New York City's Pennsylvania Station and Bay Head on the North Jersey Coast Line.

== Climate change ==
Neptune City is projected to suffer substantial impacts from sea level rise caused by human-caused climate change, including a long-term loss of half its current population. Sea level rise has already resulted in flooding in Neptune City, with the period 2005–2014 experiencing 39 days of coastal flooding, over three times the average number of coastal flooding days for the decades between 1955 and 2004. In moderate sea level rise scenarios, Neptune City is projected to suffer a 68% chance risk of at least one major flood by 2050, and annual risk of flooding is projected to increase exponentially over the 21st century, with 100% risk of annual flooding for the years after 2100.

== Religion ==
Neptune City had one church, the Memorial United Methodist Church which closed down in 2019. The building is now occupied by the New Bethel Church.

== Notable people ==
People who were born in, residents of, or otherwise closely associated with Neptune City include:

- Kate Bornstein (born 1948), author, playwright, performance artist, actress and gender theorist
- Kurt Braunohler (born 1976), comedian
- Marie Castello (1915–2008), fortune teller known as Madam Marie who is mentioned in Bruce Springsteen's song "4th of July, Asbury Park (Sandy)"
- Les Dugan (1921–2002), American football coach who was the first head football coach at Buffalo State College, serving from 1981 to 1985
- Sam Mills (1959–2005), linebacker who played in the NFL for the New Orleans Saints and Carolina Panthers
- Jack Nicholson (born 1937), actor
- Dave Rowe (born 1945), former professional football player who played in the NFL for the Baltimore Colts, New England Patriots, Oakland Raiders and San Diego Chargers
- Alex Skuby (born 1972), actor best known for appearing on King of Queens
- Garry Tallent (born 1949), E Street Band bassist, singer-songwriter
- Ned Thomson, (born 1953), politician who has represented the 30th Legislative District in the New Jersey General Assembly since 2017
- Lando Vannata (born 1992), professional mixed martial artist
