= Shrewsbury, New Jersey (disambiguation) =

Shrewsbury, New Jersey is in eastern Monmouth County.

Shrewsbury, New Jersey may also refer to:

- Shrewsbury Township, New Jersey, in eastern Monmouth County
- Shrewsbury, Upper Freehold, New Jersey in southwestern Monmouth County
