= Communications High School =

Magnet high school in Monmouth County, New Jersey, US

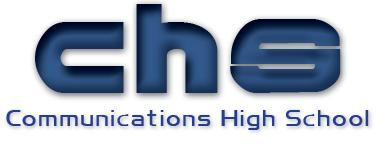

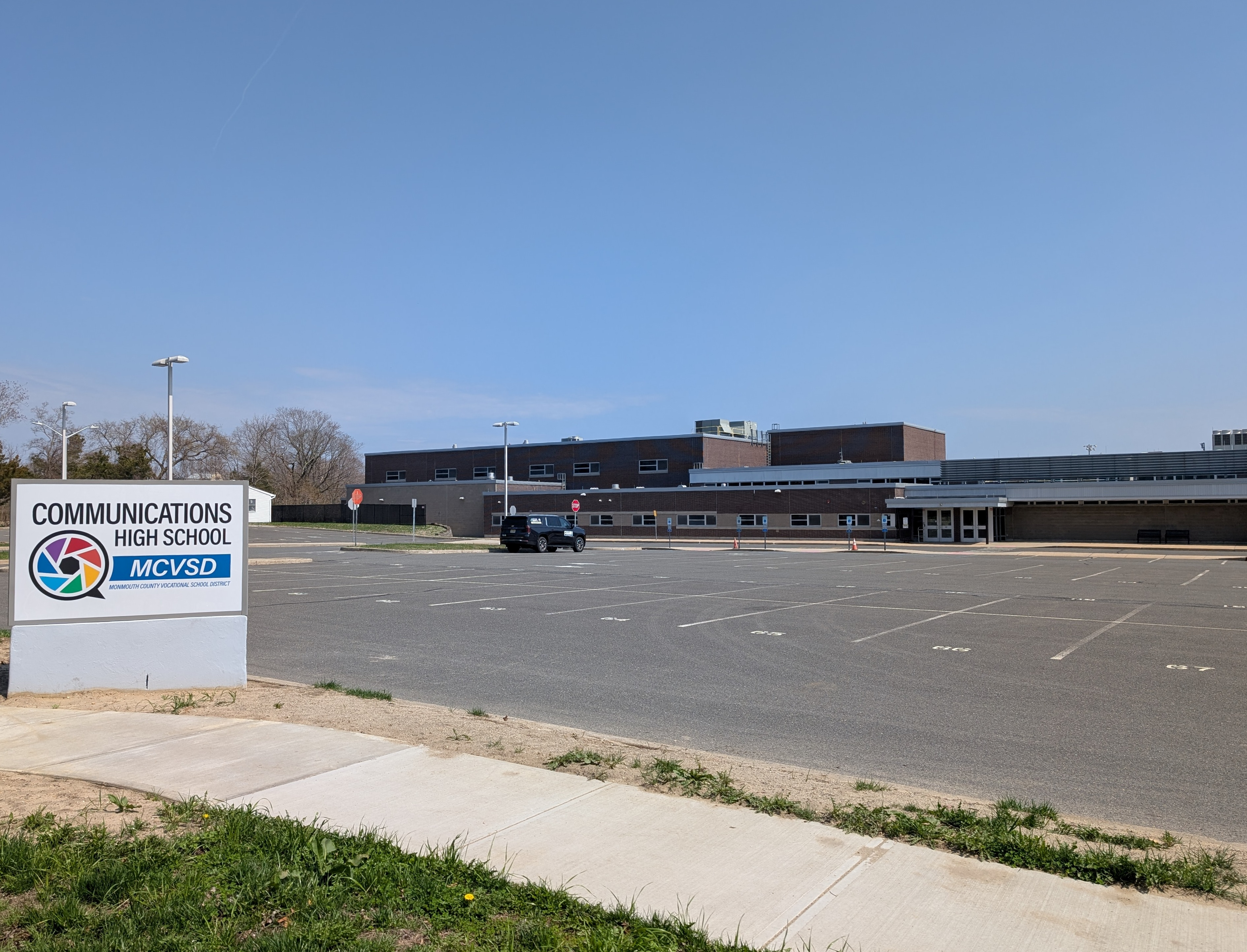

Location
- 1740 New Bedford Road; Wall Township, Monmouth County, New Jersey 07719; United States; 40.16951°N 74.062911°W

Information
- Type: Magnet public high school
- Established: 2000
- School district: Monmouth County Vocational School District
- NCES School ID: 341750000409
- Principal: Emily Bonilla
- Faculty: 30.0 FTEs
- Grades: 9-12
- Enrollment: 295 (as of 2024–25)
- Student to teacher ratio: 9.8:1
- Hours in school day: 6 Hours, 45 Minutes
- Colors: Navy blue and silver
- Accreditation: Middle States Association of Colleges and Schools
- Newspaper: The Inkblot
- Website: chs.mcvsd.org/o/chs

Communications High School (CHS) is a four-year magnet public high school and career academy serving students in ninth through twelfth grades as part of the Monmouth County Vocational School District in Monmouth County, in the U.S. state of New Jersey. CHS is located in Wall Township next to Wall High School. The school opened in 2000 with its first freshman class of 76 students and graduated its first class in 2004. The school has been accredited by the Middle States Association of Colleges and Schools Commission on Elementary and Secondary Schools since 2004.

As of the 2024–25 school year, the school had an enrollment of 295 students and 30.0 classroom teachers (on an FTE basis), for a student–teacher ratio of 9.8:1. There were 7 students (2.4% of enrollment) eligible for free lunch and none eligible for reduced-cost lunch.

== Awards, recognition and rankings ==
- In 2004, the school won its first national title, winning first in TV Graphics at the Student Television Network competition held in Los Angeles, CA.
- In 2005–06, the school averaged a 1888 combined SAT score, fifth highest of all public high schools statewide.
- Principal James Gleason was awarded a Milken Family Foundation National Educator Award in October 2007.
- In 2008, the school was awarded the silver medal for Broadcast News Production at the annual National Leadership and Skills Conference and SkillsUSA Championships.
- In 2011, CHS took home 12 statewide titles at the New Jersey SkillsUSA Championships, including Gold in Broadcast News Production, Audio Radio Production, Video Product Development, and Web Design.
- In 2012, CHS took home 8 statewide titles at the New Jersey SkillsUSA Championships, including Gold in Job Interview, Advertising Design, Crime Scene Investigation, Web Design, and Entrepreneurship.
- In 2011, CHS took home three national titles from the annual Student Television Network convention in Orlando, FL – second in Overall Broadcast, second Short Film, and first in Weather Reporting.
- In 2012, CHS took home three national titles from the annual Student Television Network convention in Dallas, TX – first in Stand-Up Reporting, honorable mention in Broadcast News Writing, and honorable mention in Weather Reporting.
- In 2012, CHS was awarded Blue Ribbon School status from the U.S. Department of Education.
- Schooldigger.com ranked the school as one of 16 schools tied for first out of 381 public high schools statewide in its 2011 rankings (unchanged from the 2010 rank) which were based on the combined percentage of students classified as proficient or above proficient on the language arts literacy (100.0%) and mathematics (100.0%) components of the High School Proficiency Assessment (HSPA).
- In its listing of "America's Best High Schools 2016", the school was ranked 27th out of 500 best high schools in the country; it was ranked 10th among all high schools in New Jersey.
- The school was honored by the National Blue Ribbon Schools Program in 2019, one of nine schools in the state recognized as Exemplary High Performing Schools.

== Mission statement ==
"Communications High School, a personalized academy with a career focus, provides a rigorous theme-based curriculum in conjunction with community, industry and higher education partnerships. Monmouth County students acquire knowledge, skills and professional ethics while utilizing the latest technology related to their communication field."

== Admissions ==
All admissions are through the Monmouth County Vocational School District administration offices. They accept 85 applicants via a highly competitive points system. The total number of points possible is 100 and the minimum to be considered is 75. The point scoring is as follows:

- 7th Grade Academic Scores (All four marking periods): 15 points
- 8th Grade Academic Scores (Only first marking period): 15 points
- Math Portion on Admissions Exam: 35 points
- LA Portion on Admissions Exam: 35 Points.

CHS accepts the top ranking student from each school district. After the first round, all left over positions go to the highest scoring applicants from every school district. There are, generally, no more acceptances after this, as there is over-enrollment in anticipation that some students will not accept the invitation.

== Academics ==
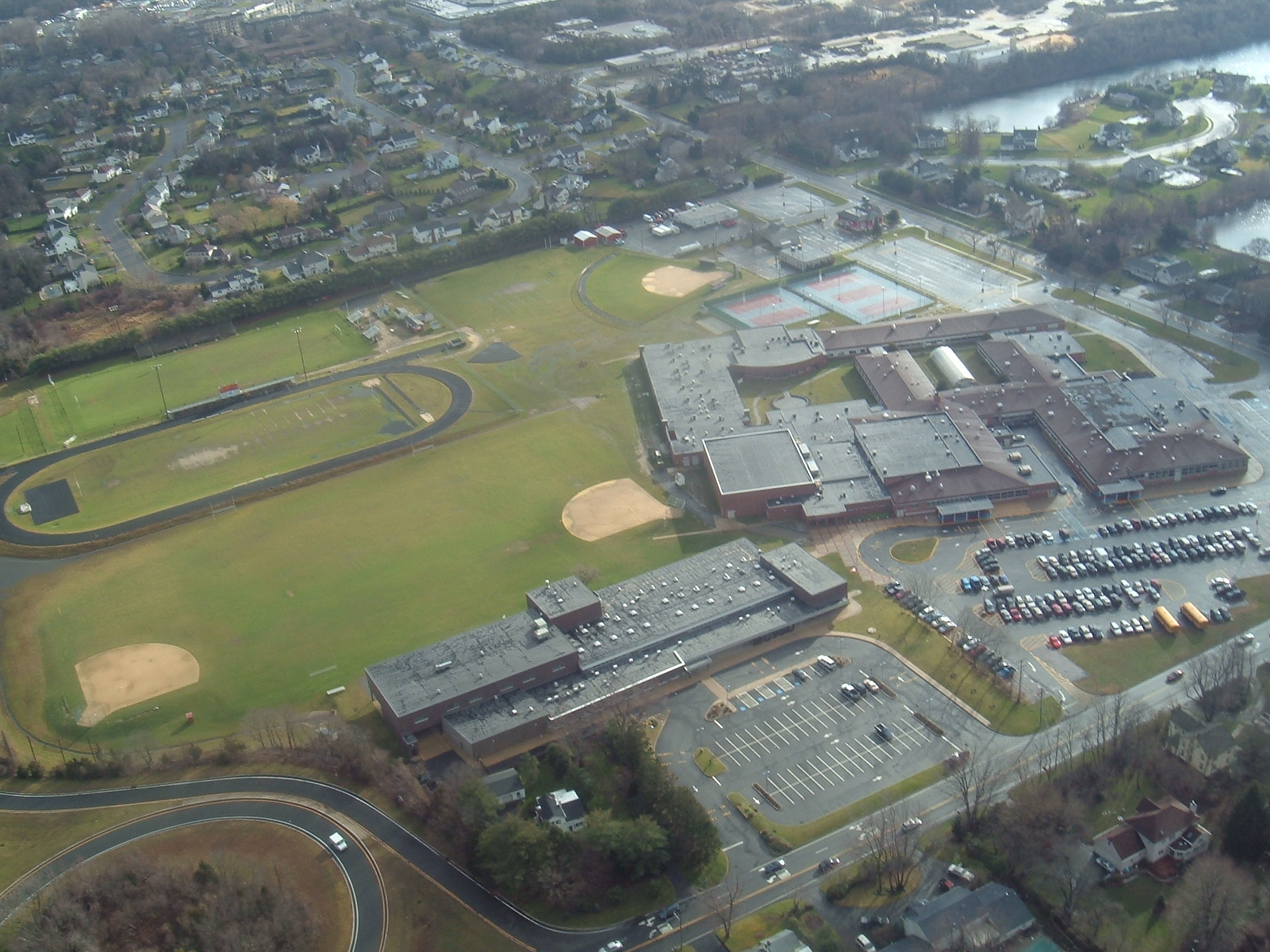
CHS is the building in the lower part of the image.

Classes operate on block scheduling. Each day is divided into four class periods and a lunch/activity period. The classes run for 85 minutes each. The lunch/activity period is placed between the second and third periods, and lasts for approximately 1 hour. Students eat lunch and participate in school clubs during that time period.

The school year is divided into two semesters. Students will attend a 5-credit class five times a week for one semester. Classes worth 2.5 credits will be attended every day for half the semester and then swapped with another class halfway through the semester; classes worth 2.5 credits are rarely given every other day. Each course is taught at an honors level even if the course name is not denoted with that designation. Students who pass every class will acquire 40 credits each school year. Students must have 160 credits in order to graduate, though the state of New Jersey only requires 120 credits to graduate from high school.

CHS requires that students explore many options during their first two years at the school. The only language offered at CHS is Spanish, and students must take at least three courses of the language. Students are required to take four years of Math, English and Science. Gym and Health classes are required every year, but seniors must fulfill class requirements outside of the school setting.

Seniors are also required to fulfill a mentorship. For one-quarter of the school year, students spend periods 3 and 4 at the mentorship site of their choice. Mentorship sites in the past have included the Asbury Park Press, Lab Volt, Brookdale Television, architectural firms, graphic design firms, radio stations, and schools. Students have freedom choosing where they are mentored.

== Student activities ==
Student activities include Student Government Association, Drama Club, National Honor Society, Radio Club, Digital Video Club, Photography Club, Broadcast Club, Skills USA/National Technical Honor Society, Yearbook, Music Club, National Art Honor Society, and the Newspaper Club, which produces the school newspaper, The Inkblot.

== Other career academies ==
There are five other full-time career academies / sister schools in the Monmouth County Vocational School District. The other schools (with 2024–25 enrollment data from the National Center for Education Statistics) are:

- Academy of Allied Health & Science (AAHS) in Neptune Township (with 300 students; in grades 9–12)
- Academy of Law and Public Safety (ALPS) in Long Branch (73; 9–12)
- Biotechnology High School (BTHS) in Freehold Township (315; 9–12)
- High Technology High School (HTHS) in the Lincroft section of Middletown Township (284; 9–12)
- Marine Academy of Science and Technology (MAST) in Sandy Hook in Middletown Township (276; 9–12)
