= Academy of Allied Health & Science =

Magnet school in Monmouth County, New Jersey, US

Academy of Allied Health and Science

Location
- 2325 Heck Avenue; Neptune Township, Monmouth County, New Jersey 07753; United States; 40.2147°N 74.0378°W

Information
- Type: Magnet public high school
- Established: 1996
- School district: Monmouth County Vocational School District
- NCES School ID: 341750000163
- Principal: Paul Mucciarone
- Faculty: 21.0 FTEs
- Grades: 9th-12th
- Enrollment: 300 (as of 2024–25)
- Student to teacher ratio: 14.3:1
- Colors: Blue, Gray
- Website: www.aahs.mcvsd.org

The Academy of Allied Health and Science (AAHS), established in 1996, is a small magnet public high school located in Neptune Township, in Monmouth County, in the U.S. state of New Jersey. The school is one of five career academies offered by the Monmouth County Vocational School District. The school focuses on medical education for teenagers who want to pursue medical careers. Proximity to Jersey Shore University Medical Center provides students with hands-on training in a hospital setting. The school has been accredited by the Middle States Association of Colleges and Schools Commission on Elementary and Secondary Schools since 1999.

The school selectively admits students from Monmouth County, accepting about 70-75 per year. All classes taken by students within the school are accelerated, honors-level classes. Students who attend this school tend to score in high percentiles on most standardized tests and the SAT, and nearly always attend four-year colleges (usually 98-100%).

As of the 2024–25 school year, the school had an enrollment of 300 students and 21.0 classroom teachers (on an FTE basis), for a student–teacher ratio of 14.3:1. There were 6 students (2.0% of enrollment) eligible for free lunch and none eligible for reduced-cost lunch.

The school has been recognized by the United States Department of Education with Blue Ribbon School award three times; 2002, 2007 and 2018.

== History ==
The school opened in 1996. The school's early development, including construction and curriculum creation, was overseen by Timothy M. McCorkell, who was the school's first principal until the end of the 2001–02 school year, when he was promoted to Assistant Superintendent at Monmouth County Vocational School District. He was later Superintendent in 2009. Following McCorkell was Scott Taylor. Taylor resigned after the 2004–05 school year to take a position at the Little Silver School District. Robert V. Cancro took the position after Scott Taylor left.

Following Robert Cancro's retirement at the end of the 2010–11 school year, Paul Mucciarone became principal.

== Awards and recognition ==
The Academy of Allied Health & Science has been recognized for many awards, including:

- In its listing of "America's Best High Schools 2016", the school was ranked 12th out of 500 best high schools in the country; it was ranked fifth among all high schools in New Jersey.
- Ranked the 4th best high school in the country for STEM in 2013.
- Newsweek named the school 9th overall among the nearly 30,000 public high schools in the U.S. in their rankings of "America's Top High Schools 2015" released in August 2015; The school was ranked 6th in New Jersey.
- Blue Ribbon School, awarded by the United States Department of Education in 2001–02, 2007, and again for a third time in 2018 - the highest honor an American school can achieve.
- For the 1999–2000 school year, it was named a "Star School" by the New Jersey Department of Education, the highest honor that a New Jersey school can achieve.
- The school was recognized by Governor Jim McGreevey in 2003 as one of 25 schools selected statewide for the First Annual Governor's School of Excellence award.
- National Service Learning Leader School 1998–1999, 2005
- Intel / Scholastic School of Distinction 2005
- Ranked 74th best high school in the country in 2009 by U.S. News & World Report.
- Ranked one of 16 schools tied for first out of 381 public high schools statewide in 2011 (unchanged from the 2010) by Schooldigger.com, based on the combined percentage of students classified as proficient or above proficient on the language arts literacy (100.0%) and mathematics (100.0%) components of the High School Proficiency Assessment (HSPA).
- The Asbury Park Press wrote an article following the students of the Academy of Allied Health and Science for a day.

== Notable alumni ==
- Ajee' Wilson (born 1994), middle-distance runner.

== Other career academies ==
There are five other full-time career academies / sister schools in the Monmouth County Vocational School District. The other schools (with 2024–25 enrollment data from the National Center for Education Statistics) are:

- Academy of Law and Public Safety (ALPS) in Long Branch (with 73 students; in grades 9–12)
- Biotechnology High School (BTHS) in Freehold Township (315; 9–12)
- Communications High School (CHS) in Wall Township (295; 9–12)
- High Technology High School (HTHS) in the Lincroft section of Middletown Township (284; 9–12)
- Marine Academy of Science and Technology (MAST) in Sandy Hook in Middletown Township (276; 9–12)
