= Marine Academy of Science and Technology =

Magnet high school in Monmouth County, New Jersey, US

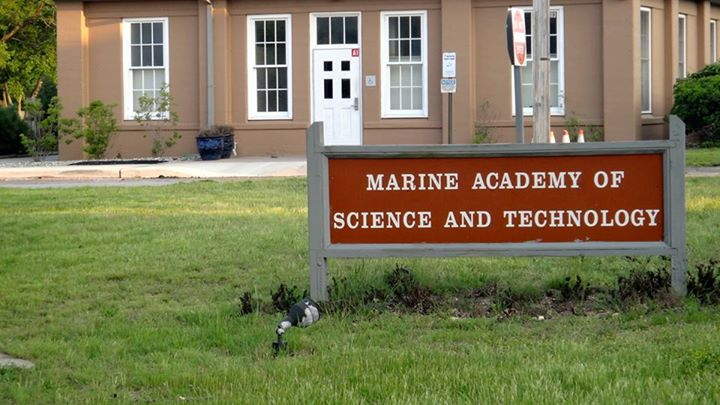

Location
- 305 MAST Way; Middletown Township, Monmouth County, New Jersey 07732; United States; 40.45995°N 74.00055°W

Information
- Type: Magnet public high school
- Established: 1981
- School district: Monmouth County Vocational School District
- NCES School ID: 341750005989
- Principal: Earl Moore
- Faculty: 27.0 FTEs
- Grades: 9-12
- Enrollment: 276 (as of 2024–25)
- Student to teacher ratio: 10.2:1
- Colors: Blue and gold
- Accreditation: Middle States Association of Colleges and Schools
- Affiliation: Sea-grant
- Website: www.mast.mcvsd.org

The Marine Academy of Science and Technology (MAST) is a coeducational four-year magnet public high school located in the Sandy Hook section of Middletown Township, in Monmouth County, in the U.S. state of New Jersey, serving students in ninth through twelfth grade. The school offers learning in all subjects, specializing in marine science and technology. It is one of five career academies administered by the Monmouth County Vocational School District (MCVSD). MAST requires each student to participate in the Naval Junior Reserve Officers' Training Corps (NJROTC) every year as well as an Annual Military Inspection (AMI) in the spring or fall. The school's curriculum focuses on marine sciences and marine technology/engineering. The school offers small classes with close personal attention.

As of the 2024–25 school year, the school had an enrollment of 276 students and 27.0 classroom teachers (on an FTE basis), for a student–teacher ratio of 10.2:1. There were 3 students (1.1% of enrollment) eligible for free lunch and none eligible for reduced-cost lunch.

The school is accredited by the Middle States Association of Colleges and Schools Commission on Elementary and Secondary Schools. The Marine Academy is a member of the National Consortium for Specialized Secondary Schools of Mathematics, Science and Technology. For the 1997–98 and 2013 school years, the Marine Academy was designated a Blue Ribbon School by the United States Department of Education. MAST was selected by the Department of Education as a New American High School for the 1998–99 school year; among the many honors and awards the innovative program has received throughout its years. On April 15, 2007, in honor of the Marine Academy's 25th Anniversary, a proclamation by the Monmouth County Board of Chosen Freeholders declared April 15 as "Marine Academy of Science and Technology Day" in Monmouth County.

== History ==
Marine Academy was founded in 1981 as a part-time program which served an inaugural class of 53 students who attended their home high school in the mornings and took 2 1/2 hours of classes at MAST in the afternoon. The school has since become a full-time diploma-granting program.

== Location and campus ==
MAST campus is located in the Fort Hancock Historic Area, as part of the Sandy Hook Unit of the Gateway National Recreation Area. The school is adjacent to the Sandy Hook Lighthouse, the oldest operating lighthouse in the country, and is within walking distance of several beaches. The campus includes 13 newly renovated buildings and various laboratories devoted to marine biology, marine chemistry, oceanography, C.A.D., and multi-media. The buildings were previously mess halls and latrines for the "Tent City" that was set up at Fort Hancock for a time during World War II. A Technology Workshop, a Media Center containing a Computer Classroom, a Naval Science Building, a state of the art wet lab in the James J. Howard Marine Science laboratory, and other classrooms round out the facilities. There is also hands-on instruction on the school research vessel, the R/V Blue Sea for underclassmen and some seniors. The "R/V Blue Sea" is currently berthed at the Coast Guard Station on Sandy Hook. This vessel is extensively used throughout many core classes in the curriculum including marine biology, marine chemistry, marine physics, and oceanography.

In the wake of significant damage to the Sandy Hook campus following Hurricane Sandy in October 2012, the MAST campus was temporarily relocated to St. Joseph's School in Keyport, in addition to the use of lab space at Brookdale Community College. As of September 9, 2013, MAST relocated back to its Sandy Hook campus.

== NJROTC ==
All students at the Marine Academy participate in the Navy Junior Reserve Officers Training Corps (NJROTC). The unit is designated as an Area 2 school and participates in many inter-unit competitions, the most prominent of which is the Drill Team. Cadets can participate in several disciplines including Freshmen, Color Guard, Armed Platoon, Unarmed Platoon, Unarmed Exhibition, and Armed Exhibition. In the past, MAST has been successful at several area competitions, including Neptune, Linden, and Areas. Exceptional performance in the Area 4 Drill Competition (placing first in 2008, 2010, 2011 and 2012) has qualified the school for national competition in Pensacola, Florida for those years. In 2016, the MAST Drill Team attended Navy Nationals once again in Pensacola, Florida, their first time back since 2012.

Each year, cadets take a physical fitness test (PFT). The standards for this exam are based upon Navy guidelines. Grades range from "unsatisfactory" to "outstanding", and the result forms a part of the Naval Science grade for credit. Satisfactory PFT performance is a criterion for advancement and promotion.

At the end of each year, qualified cadets are promoted to a rank and billet commensurate with academic performance, ability, and PFT results. The MAST unit is organized into a battalion with four companies and a headquarters section. The highest rank a cadet can achieve is Cadet Commander.

== Awards ==
- For the 1997-1998 and 2013 school years, Marine Academy of Science and Technology received the Blue Ribbon Award from the United States Department of Education, the highest honor that an American school can achieve.
- MAST was one of two high schools recognized by the New Jersey "Star School" program in its inaugural year of 1993–94. MAST has been honored twice since with the New Jersey Department of Education's highest recognition for a New Jersey school, in both 1997-98 and 2003–04.
- For the 1998–1999 school year, MAST received additional national recognition as the New American High School.
- Best Practice Award (1994, 1995, 1997, 1999, 2001 and 2003)
- New Jersey Governor's School of Excellence Award, October 2005
- Intel Scholastic 21st Century Schools of Distinction, 2004 finalist
- Toyota Tapestry Award, 2002
- Designation as NJROTC Honor Unit/CNET Unit or Distinguished Unit with Honors: every year since 1990
- In 2005–06, the school averaged a 1875 combined SAT score, sixth highest of all public high schools statewide.
- In April 2010, the MAST Ocean Bowl team competed at the National Ocean Sciences Bowl and placed 2nd in the nation.
- Schooldigger.com ranked the school as one of 16 schools tied for first out of 381 public high schools statewide in its 2011 rankings (unchanged from the 2010 ranking) which were based on the combined percentage of students classified as proficient or above proficient on the language arts literacy (100.0%) and mathematics (100.0%) components of the High School Proficiency Assessment (HSPA).
- In its 2013 report on "America's Best High Schools", The Daily Beast ranked the school 364th in the nation among participating public high schools and 33rd among schools in New Jersey.
- In September 2013, the academy was one of 15 in New Jersey to be recognized by the United States Department of Education as part of the National Blue Ribbon Schools Program, an award called the "most prestigious honor in the United States' education system" and which Education Secretary Arne Duncan described as schools that "represent examples of educational excellence".
- In April 2015 MAST was one of nine schools in the nation recognized by the National Association of State Directors of Career Technical Education Consortium (NASDCTEc) with the Excellence in Action Award. MAST won for its Marine Biology and Biological Oceanography program. NASDCTEc Executive Director, Kimberly Green, said of the winning programs, "Incredibly successful graduating their students at above average rates, building strong industry and community partnerships, and increasing students chances to obtain postsecondary credit and degrees and industry-recognized credentials,"

In its listing of "America's Best High Schools 2016", the school was ranked 181st out of 500 best high schools in the country; it was ranked 28th among all high schools in New Jersey.

== Other career academies ==
There are five other full-time career academies / sister schools in the Monmouth County Vocational School District. The other schools (with 2024–25 enrollment data from the National Center for Education Statistics) are:

- Academy of Allied Health & Science (AAHS) in Neptune Township (with 300 students; in grades 9–12)
- Academy of Law and Public Safety (ALPS) in Long Branch (73; 9–12)
- Biotechnology High School (BTHS) in Freehold Township (315; 9–12)
- Communications High School (CHS) in Wall Township (295; 9–12)
- High Technology High School (HTHS) in the Lincroft section of Middletown Township (284; 9–12)

== See also ==
- Marine Academy of Technology and Environmental Science in Ocean County, NJ
