= High Technology High School =

Magnet high school in Monmouth County, New Jersey, US

Location
- 765 Newman Springs Road; Middletown Township, Monmouth County, New Jersey 07738; United States; 40.32479°N 74.12867°W

Information
- Type: Magnet public high school
- Established: 1991
- Sister school: Marine Academy of Science and Technology (MAST); Academy of Allied Health & Science (AAHS); Communications High School (CHS); Biotechnology High School (BTHS)
- School district: Monmouth County Vocational School District
- NCES School ID: 341750006095
- Principal: Teresa Hough
- Faculty: 20.5 FTEs
- Grades: 9-12
- Enrollment: 284 (as of 2024–25)
- Student to teacher ratio: 13.9:1
- Colors: Maroon and Gray
- Accreditation: Middle States Association of Colleges and Schools
- USNWR ranking: 1 (2011)
- Communities served: Monmouth County
- Website: www.hths.mcvsd.org/o/hths

High Technology High School (Abbreviated HTHS, also known as High Tech), founded in 1991, is a four-year magnet public high school for students in ninth through twelfth grades, located in the Lincroft section of Middletown Township, in Monmouth County, in the U.S. state of New Jersey, operated as a cooperative effort between the Monmouth County Vocational School District (MCVSD) and Brookdale Community College. It is a pre-engineering academy, offering courses such as Introduction to Engineering and Design, Exploring Engineering, and Principles of Engineering. It is a member of the National Consortium for Specialized Secondary Schools of Mathematics, Science and Technology. The school has been accredited by the Middle States Association of Colleges and Schools Commission on Elementary and Secondary Schools since 1995.

In its listing of "America's Best High Schools 2016", the school was ranked 20th out of 500 best high schools in the country; it was ranked seventh among all high schools in New Jersey. In its 2013 report on "America's Best High Schools", The Daily Beast ranked the school 16th in the nation among participating public high schools and first among schools in New Jersey. According to 2011 Newsweek statistics, High Technology High School students registered an average SAT score of 2145, the highest of any U.S. high school; overall, Newsweek ranked HTHS 18th nationally and the top high school in New Jersey. In 2011, HTHS was ranked Number 1 for Best High Schools for Math & Science in U.S. News & World Report, and in 2013, the school was ranked the twelfth best high school overall in the United States by U.S. News. In its 2015 rankings, Niche.com, Inc. ranked High Technology High School the best public high school in America.

As of the 2024–25 school year, the school had an enrollment of 284 students and 20.5 classroom teachers (on an FTE basis), for a student–teacher ratio of 13.9:1. There were 6 students (2.1% of enrollment) eligible for free lunch and 1 (0.4% of students) eligible for reduced-cost lunch.

== History ==
The school opened its doors in 1991 with a sophomore class of 62 students in facilities on the campus of Brookdale Community College, with plans to add a new grade each year to accommodate grades 10–12.

The school building on the Brookdale campus was completed in 1992 and an expansion two years later allowed the school to double enrollment. A freshman class was added in fall 1995. The student population is kept relatively small, with typically 65-80 students per class year, allowing the school to maintain a low student–teacher ratio.

== Awards and recognition ==
In 1996 Founding Principal William J. Pollock EdD was awarded NJ State Principal of the Year by NASSP MetLife. In 1998 High Technology High School (HTHS) in Lincroft, NJ, was officially recognized as a. It was recognized for excellence in education, frequently described as a "benchmark school" following this inaugural award. William J. Pollock EdD was the Founding Principal at that time.

- In 2023, the school was one of nine schools in New Jersey that was recognized as a National Blue Ribbon School by the United States Department of Education.
- Business Insider ranked High Technology High School at the top of its 2014 list of the "25 best public high school in the United States".
- For the 2003–04 school year, High Technology High School received the National Blue Ribbon Award for the second time, the highest honor that an American school can achieve.
- High Technology High School was twice named a "Star School" by the New Jersey Department of Education, the highest form of recognition for a New Jersey school, in both 1994-95 and 2001–02.
- High Technology High School was recognized by Newsweek magazine in its May 28, 2007 issue covering America's Best High Schools, as one of its 21 Public Elites, a group of consistent high performers excluded from its rankings because of the number of students with SAT (or ACT) scores well above the national average.
- HTHS was cited as a "Public Elite", one of 22 such schools recognized nationwide in Newsweek magazine's listing of "America's Best High Schools" in the May 8, 2006 issue. Newsweek described the school as "A pre-engineering academy with topnotch humanities"
- HTHS was ranked as Number 2 in U.S. News & World Report's listing of "America's Best High Schools" in 2008.

== Academics ==
High Technology offers a full high school education, with emphasis on math, science, and technology. Students take college courses during their junior and senior years, and seniors are required to take a mentorship course for one semester.

Class scheduling works around block scheduling. All classes are 67 minutes long, and there are 5 periods in a day. All students eat lunch at the same time, between 11:00 and 12:00 PM. Most classes are held three times a week. Physical Education is held two periods per week. AP science classes have "double labs" which are two periods (138 minutes) long, while AP Calculus classes meet one extra period per week. The foreign languages taught at High Technology High School are Latin, French, and Spanish. Junior technology electives - Project Lead the Way courses (Digital Electronics, Civil Engineering and Architecture, Biomedical Engineering, and Computer Science & Software Engineering) - are held 3 times a week for one period, and one time a week for 2 periods (335 minutes total). Seniors have the opportunity to participate in a semester-long internship, and Engineering Design and Development the other semester.

== Extracurricular activities ==
High Technology High School offers a variety of clubs including:

- Academic Team
- Book Club
- Chess Club
- Creative Arts Club
- Debate Club
- Dance Club
- Experimental Research Group
- Finance Club
  - MIT Launch
  - Fed Challenge Team
  - Euro Challenge Team
- French Club
- Genders and Sexualities Alliance
- Key Club
- Math League
- Multicultural Club
- National Honor Society
- Newspaper Club
- Performing Arts Club
  - Drama
  - Jazz Band
- Robotics and Coding Club
  - cypHER
  - VEX Robotics
- Science Bowl
- Science Leagues
- Steminist Club
- Student Government Association
- Technology Student Association
- Various religious interest groups
- Wellness Club
- Yearbook

== Notable alumni ==
- Brian Christian (born 1984, class of 2002), author of The Alignment Problem
- Akash Modi (born 1995, class of 2013), artistic gymnast who represented the United States at the 2018 World Artistic Gymnastics Championships
- Julie Shah (born 1982, class of 2000), MIT professor named one of the world's top 35 innovators under 35
- Neel Shah (born 1982, class of 2000), physician who is Chief Medical Officer of Maven Clinic

== Other career academies ==
There are five other full-time career academies / sister schools in the Monmouth County Vocational School District. The other schools (with 2024–25 enrollment data from the National Center for Education Statistics) are:

- Academy of Allied Health & Science (AAHS) in Neptune Township (with 300 students; in grades 9–12)
- Academy of Law and Public Safety (ALPS) in Long Branch (73; 9–12)
- Biotechnology High School (BTHS) in Freehold Township (315; 9–12)
- Communications High School (CHS) in Wall Township (295; 9–12)
- Marine Academy of Science and Technology (MAST) in Sandy Hook in Middletown Township (276; 9–12)
