= Biotechnology High School =

High school in Monmouth County, New Jersey, US

Location
- 5000 Kozloski Road; Freehold Township, Monmouth County, New Jersey 07728; United States; 40.26618°N 74.245059°W

Information
- Type: Public, magnet, vocational
- Established: 2005
- School district: Monmouth County Vocational School District
- NCES School ID: 341750006121
- Principal: Sharon Bryant
- Faculty: 27.0 FTEs
- Grades: 9th-12th
- Enrollment: 315 (as of 2024–25)
- Student to teacher ratio: 11.7:1
- Accreditation: Blue Ribbon 2014
- Website: www.bths.mcvsd.org

Biotechnology High School (BTHS), or commonly referred to as Biotech, is a four-year comprehensive vocational public high school serving students in ninth through twelfth grades in Freehold Township, Monmouth County, in the U.S. state of New Jersey, as part of the Monmouth County Vocational School District (MCVSD). Its curriculum includes a science program, consisting of eight different science classes spread over four years, designed to prepare students to pursue further education in biotechnology and the natural sciences. Emphasis is placed on research, laboratory skills, critical thinking, problem solving, technology, and teamwork. Over 90% of the 2009 graduates selected college majors in the life sciences. The school has been accredited by the Middle States Association of Colleges and Schools Commission on Elementary and Secondary Schools since 2005.

Since the graduation of its first class in 2009, it has consistently been ranked one of the best high schools on the East Coast and in the United States by national media outlets. According to the national high school rankings report published annually by U.S. News & World Report, the school was ranked fifth in New Jersey and 72nd in the nation in 2023.

As of April 2007, it became an official International Baccalaureate Organization school, offering the IB Diploma Programme to all students. BTHS is the only high school in New Jersey in which 100% of students are IB Diploma Candidates. Most of the courses taken in the junior and senior years are IB courses, which are comparable to Advanced Placement (AP) courses. Courses taken during freshman and sophomore years prepare students for IB. At the beginning of their junior year, students declare either an IB Chemistry or IB Physics concentration, which requires two full years of study accumulated in an exam session. Depending on the course and plan of study, IB exams for other courses are administered in the spring of their junior or senior year. Students also complete a full-time senior mentorship under an employer of their choice during their last month before graduation.

As of the 2024–25 school year, the school had an enrollment of 315 students and 27.0 classroom teachers (on an FTE basis), for a student–teacher ratio of 11.7:1. There were 4 students (1.3% of enrollment) eligible for free lunch and none eligible for reduced-cost lunch. The average graduating class size is around 75-85 students.

== Awards, recognition, and rankings ==
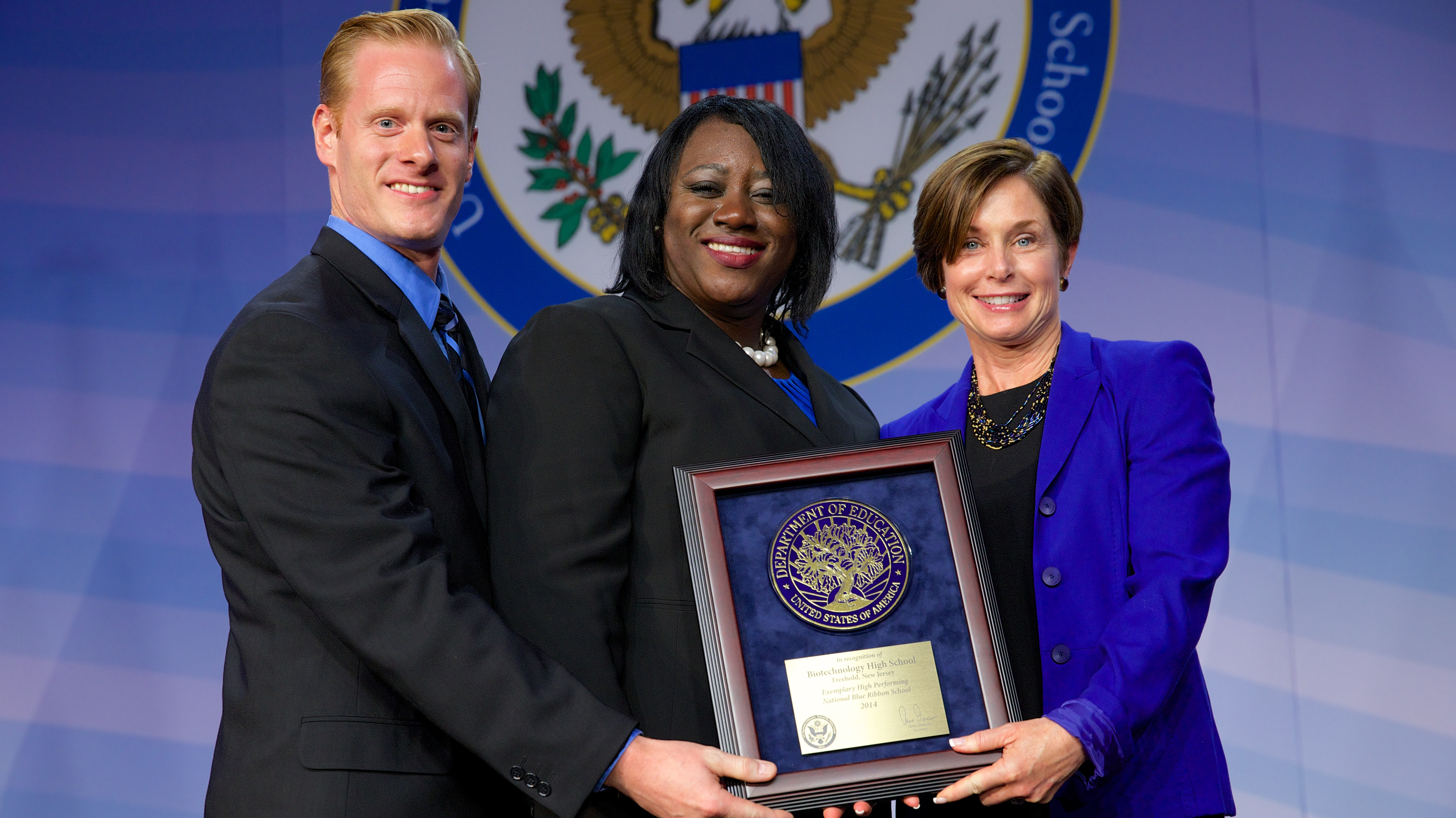
2014 National Blue Ribbon Schools Winners

In 2014, the school was recognized by the National Blue Ribbon Schools Program as one of 11 schools to be honored in the state that year, and received the National Blue Ribbon Award from the United States Department of Education, the highest honor that an American school can achieve.

In 2013, the school achieved its highest standing to date as the eighth best high school in the United States and first in New Jersey by U.S. News & World Report.

In its listing of "America's Best High Schools 2016", the school was ranked 15th out of 500 best high schools in the country; it was ranked sixth among all high schools in New Jersey. In its 2013 report on "America's Best High Schools", The Daily Beast ranked the school 24th in the nation among participating public high schools and 2nd among schools in New Jersey. The school was ranked 20th in the nation and first in New Jersey on the list of "America's Best High Schools 2012" prepared by The Daily Beast / Newsweek, with rankings based 25% each on graduation rate, matriculation rate for college and number of Advanced Placement / International Baccalaureate courses taken per student, with 10% based on average scores on the SAT / ACT, 10% on AP/IB scores and an additional 5% based on the number of AP/IB courses available to students.

In 2011, Biotech was ranked 25th out of more than 27,000 U.S. high schools by Newsweek, using a six component rating system: graduation rate (25%), college matriculation rate (25%), AP/IB tests taken per graduate (25%), average SAT/ACT scores (10%), average AP/IB scores (10%), and AP courses offered per graduate (5%). It was ranked 18th for average SAT scores (2008–2010) and 26th for number of AP/IB tests given per graduate in 2010.

In 2010, Biotechnology High School was categorized as a "Public Elite" by Newsweek. In September 2010, Biotechnology High School entered into a partnership with Monmouth University, which allows graduates to enter into the University's bachelor of science program, in addition to allowing students to participate in research projects with MU faculty.

2012-2013 average SAT scores were 662 reading, 694 math, and 678 writing.

Schooldigger.com ranked the school as one of 16 schools tied for first out of 381 public high schools statewide in its 2011 rankings (unchanged from the 2010 rank) which were based on the combined percentage of students classified as proficient or above proficient on the language arts literacy (100.0%) and mathematics (100.0%) components of the High School Proficiency Assessment (HSPA).

== Administration ==
The school's principal is Sharon Bryant.

Linda Eno, a former pre-medical teacher at the AAHS, served as the founding principal, from the school's opening in January 2006 until 2014. Sean Meehan, a former history teacher at Biotechnology High School, was principal from 2014 to 2020.

== Faculty ==
Biotech's faculty includes four teachers holding doctorates in their fields from graduate schools such as UNC Chapel Hill and Princeton University. Other staff members hold bachelor's and master's degrees, many from nearby Rutgers-New Brunswick and Monmouth University.

== Architecture ==
The Biotechnology High School facility was completed in December 2005 and cost approximately $16.9 million to construct. Designed by The Thomas Group, the building consists of 76,000 square feet (7,100 m^{2}) of space on two floors and can accommodate a student population of at least 320. It meets all requirements for LEED certification and features:

- Two dedicated biotech labs
- General-purpose labs for biology, chemistry and physics
- Tissue Culture Lab
- Hookups for alternative fuel vehicles
- An Energy Star compliant EPDM roof

== Admission criteria ==
As with all of the career academies in the Monmouth County Vocational School District, a student wishing to attend Biotechnology High School must apply in a competitive admissions process. Only those who possess high seventh grade final scores and eighth grade first semester scores (based on the core subjects, mathematics, English, science, and history), and achieve high scores in an admission exam that encompasses language arts literacy and mathematics, as compared to others applying, will be offered admission. One student with the highest scores and grades from each sending district will be admitted to the school, and the remaining openings will be filled with the next strongest applications regardless of hometown. Monmouth County students may only apply to one of the five MCVSD schools, so they must consider their application choice carefully.

Paperwork must also be submitted in the admissions process, including an application that is received upon visiting the school during a designated open-house day. The application includes a short writing task that is not considered in the admissions process.

== Curriculum ==
All students at Biotechnology High School study under a curriculum that includes eight mandatory science classes, each of which includes a laboratory component. The Biotech curriculum includes block scheduling so students may take different classes on each day of the week as well as different classes between first and second semester. All students enter the International Baccalaureate Diploma Programme at the start of their junior year, at which point they choose between an IB Physics or an IB Chemistry concentration. Students must take a biology course for all four years, in addition to physics in their sophomore year, and either chemistry or physics in their junior and senior years. Four years of humanities are also offered, as well as a multitude of STEM and humanity-based electives. Spanish is the only foreign language offered, and as such, students are introduced to the language in their first two years, and move on to complete IB Spanish in either their junior or senior year. AP Spanish is offered as an optional elective to students who complete IB Spanish in their junior year. The IB Program at Biotech includes three High Level IB classes and three Standard Level IB classes. Chemistry/Physics, Biology, and English are the high level courses and Mathematics, Spanish, and History are the standard level courses. As with all career academies in the Monmouth County Vocational School District, 160 credit-hours are required to graduate. Successful completion of Theory of Knowledge, an extended essay, Creativity, Action, Service hours, and an Individual Oral Commentary in both English and Spanish, along with receiving passing marks on all internal and external assessments, are required components for the IB Diploma. Upon graduation, eligible students receive both a high school diploma and an IB Diploma, with the latter ceremonially distributed the following academic year.

== Student life ==
Students at Biotechnology can join a variety of different organizations and clubs to enrich their academic experience. These range from competing in science competitions to participating in volunteer service projects. Many of the club meetings occur during the long lunch period that students have after their morning classes. There is a Student Government Association that helps organize events and run monthly Town Hall meetings for the entire school. Each grade also has an acting government, so students are slightly involved in the school community outside the classroom. Students have the opportunity to compete on the sports teams, band, and other activities at the high school from their sending district.

Each year, there is a Spirit Week where the four grade levels compete against each other to be the champion of the classes. Activities during this week include decorating a wall, themed school days, outdoor activities, and a talent show performance.

== Notable alumni ==
- Vincent Accettola (born 1994, class of 2012), producer and arts administrator, currently serving as Managing Director of the National Youth Orchestra of China.

== Other career academies ==
There are five other full-time career academies / sister schools in the Monmouth County Vocational School District. The other schools (with 2024–25 enrollment data from the National Center for Education Statistics) are:

- Academy of Allied Health & Science (AAHS) in Neptune Township (with 300 students; in grades 9–12)
- Academy of Law and Public Safety (ALPS) in Long Branch (73; 9–12)
- Communications High School (CHS) in Wall Township (295; 9–12)
- High Technology High School (HTHS) in the Lincroft section of Middletown Township (284; 9–12)
- Marine Academy of Science and Technology (MAST) in Sandy Hook in Middletown Township (276; 9–12)
