= Monmouth County Vocational School District =

Vocational school district in Monmouth County, New Jersey, US

Address
- 4000 Kozloski Road Freehold Township, Monmouth County, New Jersey, 07728
- Coordinates: 40.269626°N 74.244806°W

District information
- Grades: Vocational
- Superintendent: Charles R. Ford Jr.
- Business administrator: Kelly A. Brazelton
- Schools: 8

Students and staff
- Enrollment: 1,564 (as of 2023–24)
- Faculty: 207.5 FTEs
- Student–teacher ratio: 7.5:1

Other information
- Website: www.mcvsd.org
Ind.	Per pupil	District spending	Rank (*)	Vocational average	%± vs. average
1A	Total Spending	$23,960	15	$18,891	26.8%
1	Budgetary Cost	16,304	10	17,296	−5.7%
2	Classroom Instruction	9,761	16	9,045	7.9%
6	Support Services	1,528	5	2,269	−32.7%
8	Administrative Cost	2,099	9	2,353	−10.8%
10	Operations & Maintenance	2,823	10	3,014	−6.3%
16	Median Teacher Salary	63,660	14	65,035
Data from NJDoE 2014 Taxpayers' Guide to Education Spending. *Of Vocational districts with any number of students. Lowest spending=1; Highest=21

The Monmouth County Vocational School District (MCVSD) is a vocational and technical public school district in Monmouth County, in the U.S. state of New Jersey, providing vocational education to students across the county. The district has 15 learning environments. The shared time programs located in Aberdeen Township, Freehold Township, Hazlet Township, Keyport, Long Branch, Middletown Township and Wall Township provide students with field experience in various trades and professions.

As of the 2023–24 school year, the district, comprised of eight schools, had an enrollment of 1,564 students and 207.5 classroom teachers (on an FTE basis), for a student–teacher ratio of 7.5:1.

Many of the academies provide students with academic and professional field experience. In addition, MCVSD manages three specialty schools for students at risk as well as the MCVSD Law Enforcement Program for students interested in a career in Law Enforcement.

== Schools ==
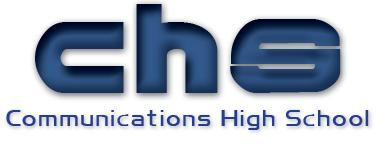
Communications High School

Schools in the district (with 2023–24 enrollment data from the National Center for Education Statistics) are:

Full-time specialized schools

- Academy of Allied Health & Science (AAHS) in Neptune Township (304 students; in grades 9–12)
- Academy of Law and Public Safety in Long Branch (70; 9–12)
- Biotechnology High School (BTHS) in Freehold Township (320; 9–12)
- Communications High School (CHS) in Wall Township (299; 9–12)
- High Technology High School (HTHS) in the Lincroft section of Middletown Township (284; 9-12)
- Marine Academy of Science and Technology (MAST) in Sandy Hook in Middletown Township (273; 9–12)

Other / shared-time programs

- Monmouth County Career Center in Freehold (6; 9–12)
- Monmouth County Vocational Technical High School in Hazlet (4; 11–12)

== Awards and recognition ==
Academy of Allied Health & Science

- For the 2001-02 school year, the Academy of Allied Health & Science received the National Blue Ribbon Award of Excellence from the United States Department of Education, the highest honor that an American school can achieve.
- For the 1999-2000 school year, the school was named a "Star School" by the New Jersey Department of Education, the highest honor that a New Jersey school can achieve.
- The school was recognized by Governor Jim McGreevey in 2003 as one of 25 schools selected statewide for the First Annual Governor's School of Excellence award.
- For the 2006-07 school year, the Academy of Allied Health & Science received a second National Blue Ribbon Award of Excellence from the United States Department of Education, (the first school in the entire Northeast region to receive the ribbon a second time) the highest honor that an American school can achieve.

High Technology High School

- In 2023, the school was one of nine schools in New Jersey that was recognized as a National Blue Ribbon School by the United States Department of Education.
- For the 2003-04 school year, High Technology High School received the National Blue Ribbon Award.
- High Technology High School was twice named a "Star School" by the New Jersey Department of Education, the highest form of recognition for a New Jersey school, in both 1994-95.
- High Technology High School was twice named within the top five high schools in the nation by U.S. News magazine, in both 2007 and 2008. In 2007, it received the 5th place rank, and in 2008, it received the 4th best high school ranking.
- In 2007, 2008, and 2010, High Technology High School was recognized by Newsweek magazine as a Public Elite school, due to its exceptional quality and its high average scores on standardized testing like the SAT and ACT.

Biotechnology High School

- In 2010, Biotech was recognized by Newsweek magazine as a Public Elite school, due to its exceptional quality and its high average scores on standardized testing like the SAT and ACT.
- In 2013 and 2014 Biotechnology High School was ranked the number one high school in New Jersey by U.S. News magazine.
- The school was one of 11 in the state to be recognized in 2014 by the United States Department of Education's National Blue Ribbon Schools Program.

Marine Academy of Science and Technology

- Marine Academy was named a "Star School" by the New Jersey Department of Education, the highest honor that a New Jersey school can achieve, in the 1993-94 school year.
- For the 1997-98 school year, the Marine Academy was designated a Blue Ribbon School by the United States Department of Education.

Communications High School

- For the 2012-13 school year, Communications High School received the Blue Ribbon Award from the United States Department of Education, the highest honor that an American school can achieve.
- The school was honored by the National Blue Ribbon Schools Program in 2019, one of nine schools in the state recognized as Exemplary High Performing Schools.

== Administration ==
Core members of the district's administration are:

- Charles R. Ford Jr., superintendent
- Kelly A. Brazelton, business administrator and board secretary

== Board of education ==
The district's board of education is comprised of five members. The county executive superintendent of schools serves on an ex officio basis. The other four members are appointed by the Monmouth County Board of County Commissioners to four-year terms of office. The board appoints a superintendent to oversee the district's day-to-day operations and a business administrator to supervise the business functions of the district.
