= List of shipwrecks in 1878 =

The list of shipwrecks in 1878 includes ships sunk, foundered, grounded, or otherwise lost during 1878.

table of contents
← 1877 / 1878 / 1879 →
Jan	Feb	Mar	Apr
May	Jun	Jul	Aug
Sep	Oct	Nov	Dec
Unknown date

== Unknown date ==
List of shipwrecks: Unknown date in 1878
Ship	State	Description
Advocate	United Kingdom	The barque capsized in the Atlantic Ocean between 13 May and 17 June. Her crew were rescued by N. B. Palmer (Norway). Advocate was on a voyage from New York, United States to "Dunkirk, Scotland".
Agnes	New South Wales	The schooner was wrecked on a reef in the Capricorn Islands, Queensland. She was on a voyage from Sydney to Townsville, Queensland.
Ane Kjerstine	Denmark	The schooner capsized between 15 February and 23 June. She was on a voyage from Galipoli, Ottoman Empire to Antwerp, Belgium. She was towed in to Le Tréport, Seine-Inférieure, France in a capsized condition on 23 June.
Antonia Cane	(United Kingdom of Great Britain and Ireland) Gibraltar	The vessel was lost sometime in 1878. Wreckage from her – three pieces of board bearing the words "Antonia Cane" and "Gibraltar" – were collected by the Custom House Officer at Newquay, Cornwall, on 28 October.
Cambria	Flag unknown	The quarter board of Cambria was washed up on the beach at Sennen.
Clara	United Kingdom	The brig foundered at sea between 19 March and 28 May. Her crew were rescued. She was on a voyage from London to Port Natal, Natal Colony.
Confederate	United States	The ship collided with another vessel and sank off Brier Island, Nova Scotia, Canada. She was on a voyage from Philadelphia, Pennsylvania to Saint John, New Brunswick, Canada. She was refloated on 29 June.
Cordelia	United Kingdom	The barque departed from the River Tyne for Cartagena, Spain in late September or early October. No further trace, presumed foundered with the loss of all fifteen crew. A ship seen on fire in the Bay of Biscay in late October or early November may have been the Cordelia.
Cunard	United States	The schooner was lost off the Grand Banks of Newfoundland in November or December, 1878 or in early 1879 with the loss of all fourteen crew.
Cypress	United Kingdom	The steamship was wrecked at Palavas-les-Flots, Hérault, France between 18 February and 29 March. She was on a voyage from Cortes to Cette, Hérault.
D. C. Bradley	Flag unknown	The schooner was lost in the vicinity of "Squan," a term used at the time for the coast of New Jersey near Manasquan and sometimes for the 7-nautical-mile (13 km) stretch of coast between Manasquan Inlet and Cranberry Inlet or for the entire coast of New Jersey between Sea Girt and Barnegat Inlet.
Don José	Spain	The barque was destroyed by fire after 13 November. She was on a voyage from Antwerp to Havana, Cuba.
Dove	United Kingdom	The crew abandoned ship when they sighted Launcelot (United Kingdom) and were taken to Yokohama Japan. Dove had been attacked at Threshold Bay and when the crew abandoned they were within 40 nautical miles (74 km) of Ambino, New Guinea, and the ship had 2 feet (0.61 m) of water in the hold.
Egremont Castle	United Kingdom	The barque departed from San Francisco, California for a British port late in 1878. No further trace, presumed foundered with the loss of all hands.
Eliza Walker	Flag unknown	The ship collided with the clipper ship Red Jacket (United Kingdom) and sank. Her crew were rescued.
Esther Smeed	United Kingdom	Off course, Esther Smeed ran ashore on the Swedish island of Gotska Sandön in calm weather. While trying to refloat, a storm brewed and the ship went ashore a second time, filling with water and was abandoned.
Eureka	United States	The ship was abandoned in the South Atlantic between 25 March and 16 May. She was on a voyage from New York to Yokohama.
Fire Queen	United Kingdom	The barque was wrecked in Sendai Bay between 4 January and 6 April. Her crew were rescued.
Fusō	Imperial Japanese Navy	The ironclad ran aground in the Suez Canal, damaging her propellers. She was refloated and taken in to Suez, Egypt for repairs.
Kathline	United Kingdom	The ship disappeared during 1878. The body of her captain was identified at Campbeltown, Argyllshire, by three captains from Newquay.
Langley	United States	The schooner struck a rock in Chatham Strait in the Alexander Archipelago, Department of Alaska, and became a total loss.
Maggie McDonald	Flag unknown	The schooner was lost at Wreck Pond Inlet on the coast of New Jersey, United States.
Maria Louis	Flag unknown	The ship collided with the steamship Juan (United Kingdom) before 17 September. She was abandoned and set afire. Her crew were rescued by Juan.
Mary	United States	The schooner went ashore approximately 24 nautical miles (44 km) south of Detroit, Michigan, following a storm, during which she became waterlogged, losing four of her six crew. She was carrying cordwood from Chicago, Illinois.
Marchman	United Kingdom	The ship foundered in the Grand Banks of Newfoundland. Her seventeen crew took to boats; they were rescued 22 days later by Brittain (United Kingdom).
Massimo d'Azeglio	Italy	The ship was abandoned in the Atlantic Ocean after 20 September. Her crew were rescued by a schooner. She was on a voyage from Bristol, Gloucestershire, United Kingdom to New York.
New Jersey	Flag unknown	The barque was lost in the vicinity of "Squan," a term used at the time for the coast of New Jersey near Manasquan and sometimes for the 7-mile (11 km) stretch of coast between Manasquan Inlet and Cranberry Inlet or for the entire coast of New Jersey between Sea Girt and Barnegat Inlet.
Onward	Flag unknown	The ship was wrecked on the Australian coast. One able-seaman and four Kanakas survived.
Primavera	Italy	The barque was destroyed by fire at sea between 17 July and 27 September. Some of her crew were rescued by the barque John Shephard (United States). Primavera was on a voyage from Hull, Yorkshire, United Kingdom to Montevideo, Uruguay.
R. E. Miles	United Kingdom	The ketch foundered off the coast of Cornwall with the loss of all hands between 26 March and 5 April. She was on a voyage from Truro, Cornwall to Carmarthen.
Riverdale	United States	The schooner was run into and sunk off Thacher Island, Massachusetts. Her crew were rescued.
San Carlos	United Kingdom	The ship collided with the steamship Blenheim (United Kingdom) and san between 30 August and 31 October. Her crew were rescued. San Carlos was on a voyage from the Clyde to Demerara, British Guiana.
Vermont	United Kingdom	The ship was abandoned in the Atlantic Ocean between 23 March and 6 April. She was on a voyage from Cardiff, Glamorgan to Rio de Janeiro, Brazil.
