= Sea Girt School District =

School district in Monmouth County, New Jersey, US

Address
- 451 Bell Place Sea Girt, Monmouth County, New Jersey, 08750; United States
- Coordinates: 40.134895°N 74.041534°W

District information
- Grades: PreK-8
- Superintendent: Richard Papera
- Business administrator: Frank Gripp
- Schools: 1

Students and staff
- Enrollment: 148 (as of 2024–25)
- Faculty: 24.6 FTEs
- Student–teacher ratio: 6.0:1

Other information
- District Factor Group: I
- Website: www.seagirt.k12.nj.us
Ind.	Per pupil	District spending	Rank (*)	K-8 average	%± vs. average
1A	Total Spending	$22,571	55	$18,891	19.5%
1	Budgetary Cost	19,398	59	14,159	37.0%
2	Classroom Instruction	10,523	56	8,659	21.5%
6	Support Services	3,984	63	2,167	83.8%
8	Administrative Cost	1,848	60	1,547	19.5%
10	Operations & Maintenance	2,249	55	1,612	39.5%
13	Extracurricular Activities	533	68	104	412.5%
16	Median Teacher Salary	62,704	59	61,136
Data from NJDoE 2014 Taxpayers' Guide to Education Spending. *Of K-8 districts with up to 400 students. Lowest spending=1; Highest=71

Sea Girt School District is a community public school district that serves students in pre-kindergarten through eighth grade from Sea Girt, in Monmouth County, in the U.S. state of New Jersey.

As of the 2024–25 school year, the district, comprised of one school, had an enrollment of 148 students and 24.6 classroom teachers (on an FTE basis), for a student–teacher ratio of 6.0:1.

For ninth through twelfth grades, Sea Girt's public school students attend Manasquan High School, as part of a sending/receiving relationship with the Manasquan Public Schools. Manasquan High School also serves students from Avon-by-the-Sea, Belmar, Brielle, Lake Como, Spring Lake, Spring Lake Heights who attend Manasquan High School as part of sending/receiving relationships with their respective districts. As of the 2024–25 school year, the high school had an enrollment of 917 students and 79.2 classroom teachers (on an FTE basis), for a student–teacher ratio of 11.6:1.

== History ==
In the 2016–17 school year, Sea Girt had the 21st smallest enrollment of any school district in the state, with 145 students.

The district had been classified by the New Jersey Department of Education as being in District Factor Group "I", the second-highest of eight groupings. District Factor Groups organize districts statewide to allow comparison by common socioeconomic characteristics of the local districts. From lowest socioeconomic status to highest, the categories are A, B, CD, DE, FG, GH, I and J.

== Awards and recognition ==
For the 2005–06 and 2017-18 school years, Sea Girt Elementary School was one of the select schools in New Jersey recognized by the United States Department of Education as a recipient of the National Blue Ribbon Schools Program, the highest official level of recognition that an American school can receive. The school was one of nine public schools recognized as Blue Ribbon schools in 2017.

== School ==
Sea Girt Elementary School had an enrollment of 148 students in grades PreK–8 in the 2024–25 school year.

- Richard Papera, principal

== Administration ==
Core members of the district's administration include:

- Richard Papera, superintendent
- Frank Gripp, business administrator and board secretary

== Board of education ==
The district's board of education, comprised of five members, sets policy and oversees the fiscal and educational operation of the district through its administration. As a Type II school district, the board's trustees are elected directly by voters to serve three-year terms of office on a staggered basis, with either one or two seats up for election each year held (since 2012) as part of the November general election. The board appoints a superintendent to oversee the district's day-to-day operations and a business administrator to supervise the business functions of the district.
