= Spring Lake Heights School District =

School district in Monmouth County, New Jersey, US

Address
- 1110 Route 71 Spring Lake Heights, Monmouth County, New Jersey, 07762; United States
- Coordinates: 40.15506°N 74.035214°W

District information
- Grades: PreK-8
- Superintendent: John W. Spalthoff
- Business administrator: Matthew K. Varley
- Schools: 1

Students and staff
- Enrollment: 266 (as of 2023–24)
- Faculty: 40.3 FTEs
- Student–teacher ratio: 6.6:1

Other information
- District Factor Group: FG
- Website: www.slheights.org
Ind.	Per pupil	District spending	Rank (*)	K-8 average	%± vs. average
1A	Total Spending	$16,833	19	$18,891	−10.9%
1	Budgetary Cost	13,415	15	14,159	−5.3%
2	Classroom Instruction	7,403	10	8,659	−14.5%
6	Support Services	2,663	46	2,167	22.9%
8	Administrative Cost	1,665	38	1,547	7.6%
10	Operations & Maintenance	1,449	20	1,612	−10.1%
13	Extracurricular Activities	236	51	104	126.9%
16	Median Teacher Salary	56,744	28	61,136
Data from NJDoE 2014 Taxpayers' Guide to Education Spending. *Of K-8 districts with up to 400 students. Lowest spending=1; Highest=71

The Spring Lake Heights School District is a community public school district that serves students in pre-kindergarten through eighth grade from Spring Lake Heights, in Monmouth County, in the U.S. state of New Jersey.

As of the 2023–24 school year, the district, comprised of one school, had an enrollment of 266 students and 40.3 classroom teachers (on an FTE basis), for a student–teacher ratio of 6.6:1.

The district had been classified by the New Jersey Department of Education as being in District Factor Group "FG", the fourth-highest of eight groupings. District Factor Groups organize districts statewide to allow comparison by common socioeconomic characteristics of the local districts. From lowest socioeconomic status to highest, the categories are A, B, CD, DE, FG, GH, I and J.

Public school students in ninth through twelfth grades attend Manasquan High School in Manasquan, as part of a sending/receiving relationship with the Manasquan Public Schools. Manasquan High School also serves students from Avon-by-the-Sea, Belmar, Brielle, Lake Como, Sea Girt and Spring Lake, who attend Manasquan High School as part of sending/receiving relationships with their respective districts. As of the 2023–24 school year, the high school had an enrollment of 945 students and 81.2 classroom teachers (on an FTE basis), for a student–teacher ratio of 11.6:1.

== Awards and recognition ==
Spring Lake Heights School was recognized by Governor Jim McGreevey in 2003 as one of 25 schools selected statewide for the First Annual Governor's School of Excellence award.

== School ==
Spring Lake Heights School had an enrollment of 262 students in grades PreK–8 as of the 2023–24 school year. The school was built in 1938.

- John W. Spalthoff, principal

== Administration ==
Core members of the district's administration are:

- John W. Spalthoff, superintendent
- Matthew K. Varley, business administrator and board secretary

== Board of education ==
The district's board of education, comprised of five members, sets policy and oversees the fiscal and educational operation of the district through its administration. As a Type II school district, the board's trustees are elected directly by voters to serve three-year terms of office on a staggered basis, with either one or two seats up for election each year held (since 2012) as part of the November general election. The board appoints a superintendent to oversee the district's day-to-day operations and a business administrator to supervise the business functions of the district.
