= Villa Park, New Jersey =

Villa Park, New Jersey may refer to:

- Villa Park, Trenton, New Jersey in Mercer County
- Villa Park, Monmouth County, New Jersey in Spring Lake Heights
