= List of shipwrecks in 1880 =

The list of shipwrecks in 1880 includes ships sunk, foundered, grounded, or otherwise lost during 1880.

table of contents
← 1879 / 1880 / 1881 →
| Jan | Feb | Mar | Apr |
| May | Jun | Jul | Aug |
| Sep | Oct | Nov | Dec |
Unknown date

== Unknown date ==
List of shipwrecks: Unknown date in 1880
| Ship | State | Description |
|---|---|---|
| Alpha | Norway | The barque was lost at sea between 30 January and 12 March. Her crew were rescued. She was on a voyage from Philadelphia, Pennsylvania, United States to Aarhus, Denmark. |
| Beatrice | United Kingdom | The schooner sank in St George's Bay, Newfoundland Colony. Her crew survived. She was on a voyage from Gaspé, Quebec, Canada to Rio de Janeiro, Brazil. |
| Belgravia | United Kingdom | The ship was abandoned in the Atlantic Ocean between 13 November and 8 December. She was on a voyage from Quebec City, Canada to the Clyde. |
| Bossuet | France | The full-rigged ship was wrecked on Tahiti. Her crew were rescued. |
| Captain Madsen | Norway | The barque was abandoned in the Atlantic Ocean. Her crew were rescued. She was on a voyage from Pensacola, Florida, United States to Leith, Lothian, United Kingdom. She was subsequently wrecked at the mouth of the St. Johns River in a hurricane The wreck was subsequently towed in to Jacksonville, Florida. |
| Cavaliere Squardelli | United Kingdom | The brig foundered in the West Indies. Her crew survived. She was on a voyage from Greenock, Renfrewshire to Demerara, British Guiana. |
| Cometen | Netherlands | The ship ran aground on a reef before 29 September. She was on a voyage from Java, Netherlands East Indies to Amsterdam, North Holland. She was refloated and resumed her voyage. |
| David Law | United Kingdom | The ship caught fire and exploded. She was beached on the Elephant Keys and burnt out. Her 22 crew survived. David Law was on a voyage from Leith to San Francisco, California, United States. Her crew were landed at Plymouth on 3 December by HMS Raleigh (Royal Navy). |
| Emma | United Kingdom | The barque was driven ashore at Morant Bay, Jamaica. She was refloated in September. |
| Georgia | Flag unknown | The steamship departed from Fuzhou, China for Adelaide, South Australia in late August or early September. Subsequently foundered. Wreckage washed ashore at Edithburgh, South Australia. |
| Lord of the Isles | United Kingdom | The barque was wrecked on the coast of Sakhalin, Russia. Her crew survived. |
| Marie | France | The fishing vessel was wrecked on the coast of Iceland. Her 20 crew survived. |
| Nagay | United States | The schooner was lost at Popof Island in the Shumagin Islands off the south coast of the Department of Alaska during the summer of 1880. Her crew survived. |
| Nenuphar | United Kingdom | The barque was wrecked. She was on a voyage from Bahia, Brazil to New York, United States. |
| Norden | United Kingdom | The ship foundered in the Atlantic Ocean between 14 October and 1 December. Her crew were rescued by the steamship City of London (United Kingdom). Norden was on a voyage from Quebec City to London, United Kingdom. |
| Oleander | United Kingdom | The barque foundered at sea. Her crew took to a boat; they were rescued four weeks later by the barque Offerton (United Kingdom). Oleander was on a voyage from Valparaíso, Chile to Liverpool. |
| Rathmore | United Kingdom | The steamship foundered in the Mediterranean Sea between 3 January and 8 February with the loss of all hands. She was on a voyage from Cardiff, Glamorgan to Bombay, India. |
| Rock Light | United Kingdom | The barque was presumed to have foundered in the Atlantic Ocean with the loss of all 35 crew. She was on a voyage from New York to Bristol, Gloucestershire. A lifebuoy from the ship washed up on Faial Island, Azores in mid-April. |
| Sea Nymph | (United Kingdom of Great Britain and Ireland) Jersey | The ship departed from Saint-Malo, Ille-et-Vilaine, France for Gibraltar. No further trace, presumed foundered with the loss of all hands. |
| Sea Shell | Tasmania | The ship was wrecked on a reef off Noumea, New Caledonia. Her crew were rescued. |
