= The Frog and the Peach =

The Frog and The Peach
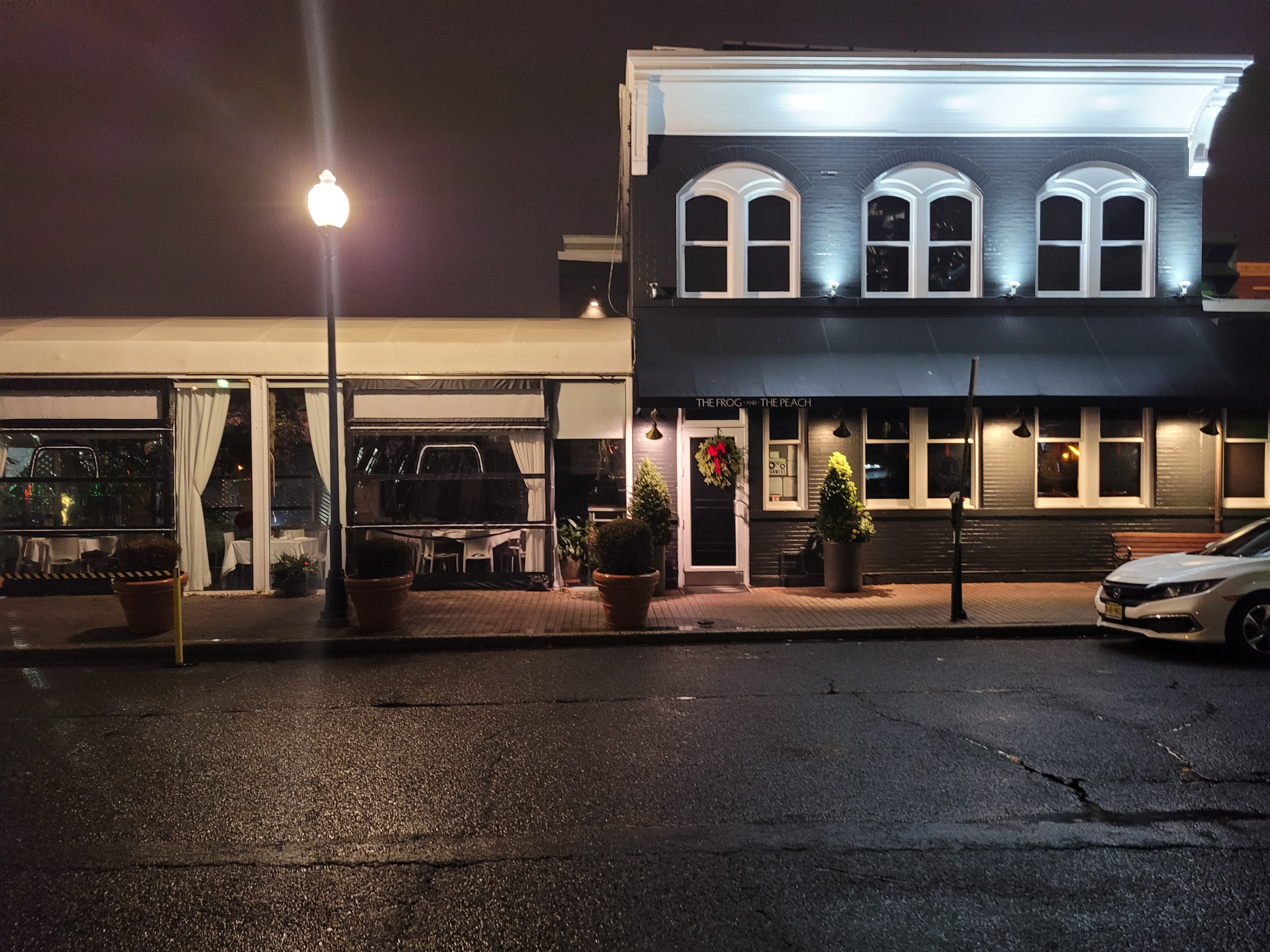

- Location within New Jersey

Restaurant information
- Established: 1983
- Owner: Bruce Lefebvre
- Head chef: Joe Weenis
- Location: 29 Dennis Street, New Brunswick, New Jersey, 08901
- Coordinates: 40.49496°N 74.44094°W
- Website: http://www.frogandpeach.com

The Frog and The Peach is a restaurant in New Brunswick, New Jersey, United States with Bruce Lefebvre as owner and executive chef.

== History ==
The restaurant was founded in 1983 by the married couple Betsy Alger and Jim Black. The name of the restaurant comes from a comedy sketch by Peter Cook and Dudley Moore.

== Reviews ==
It was AOL's City Guide's "Best All-Around Restaurant in North Jersey" in 2005–2006. The restaurant was rated the fourth most popular restaurant in New Jersey by Zagat. The Star-Ledger awarded four stars to the restaurant in January 2007.

== Resident chef and owner ==
In May 2012, Lefebvre purchased the restaurant. Lefebvre had been the executive chef at the restaurant since 2001. He was born in 1969 in Edison, New Jersey and was raised in Sea Girt, New Jersey. Lefebvre graduated from Wake Forest University and then applied to The Culinary Institute of America. After graduating, he worked briefly at The Frog and the Peach, but then left to work at Aureole, Lespinasse, and Dan's on Main Street in Metuchen, New Jersey before returning to Frog and Peach in 2000 as sous chef.
