= List of shipwrecks in 1881 =

The list of shipwrecks in 1881 includes ships sunk, foundered, grounded, or otherwise lost during 1881.

table of contents
1881
| Jan | Feb | Mar | Apr |
| May | Jun | Jul | Aug |
| Sep | Oct | Nov | Dec |
Unknown date

== Unknown date ==
List of shipwrecks: Unknown date in 1881
| Ship | State | Description |
|---|---|---|
| Arctic | Flag unknown | The brigantine was lost in the vicinity of "Squan", a term used at the time for the coast of New Jersey near Manasquan and sometimes for the 7-mile (11 km) stretch of coast between Manasquan Inlet and Cranberry Inlet or for the entire coast of New Jersey between Sea Girt and Barnegat Inlet. |
| Cornelia and Maria | Netherlands | The brigantine ran aground at Benin City, Kingdom of Benin and was abandoned by her crew between 4 June and 2 September. She subsequently broke up. |
| Edwin Webster | United States | The whaler was wrecked near Point Barrow, Department of Alaska in the summer. There were at least three survivors. |
| Ellengowan | United Kingdom | The steamship struck a sandbar in the Daly River, South Australia (now in the Northern Territory), and sank. She was refloated in 1885, repaired, and returned to service. |
| Elliot Ritchie | United States | The schooner was abandoned at sea after a fire broke out in one of her cargo holds. |
| Frederick Hasselman | Sweden | The clipper was lost near Quebec City, Canada. |
| Glendorgal | United Kingdom | The schooner became a total wreck near Ilfracombe, Devon. |
| Guacolda | Chilean Navy | War of the Pacific: The torpedo boat was wrecked on the coast of Chile. |
| Hattie M | United Kingdom | The barque was abandoned in the Atlantic Ocean. Her crew were rescued. |
| Henrietta | United Kingdom | The schooner foundered off the coast of New Caledonia with the loss of all but two of her crew. |
| Jubinal | United Kingdom | The ship was abandoned in the Atlantic Ocean after 21 October. She was on a voyage from Bathurst, New Brunswick, Canada to Whitehaven, Cumberland. |
| Kirstina | Norway | The ship was abandoned in the North Sea between 28 September and 7 October. She was on a voyage from South Shields, County Durham, United Kingdom to Helsingør, Denmark. |
| Kismet | United Kingdom | The barque went missing and probably foundered in the Atlantic Ocean. She was on a voyage from Bahia, Brazil to New York, United States. |
| Lammerlaw | United Kingdom | The ship sank in Shoalwater Bay after 2 August. She was on a voyage from Newcastle, New South Wales to Portland, Oregon, United States. |
| Los Angeles | United States | The vessel sank in Peril Strait in the Alexander Archipelago in the Department of Alaska. |
| Maritime Union | United Kingdom | The ship was destroyed by fire at sea. Two of her crew were rescued by Mary F. Cowell (Flag unknown). Maritime Union was on a voyage from Hull, Yorkshire to San Francisco, California, United States. |
| Oakhurst | United Kingdom | The ship caught fire at sea between 13 June and 24 October. She was on a voyage from Hull to San Francisco. |
| O.K. | United States | The paddle steamer was lost in either 1867 or 1881. |
| Sarco | United Kingdom | The ship was lost whilst on a voyage from Newcastle upon Tyne, Northumberland to Valparaíso, Chile. |
| Severn | United Kingdom | The barque collided with Mayumba (United Kingdom) and sank off Madeira, Portugal. |
| Vigilance | United States | The whaler was wrecked near "Serdze Kemen", Russia in the Spring with loss of life. |
| Wandering Minstrel | United Kingdom | The ship was wrecked in a cyclone at Mauritius before 4 March. She was on a voyage from Table Bay to Calcutta, India. |
