= List of shipwrecks in 1879 =

The list of shipwrecks in 1879 includes ships sunk, foundered, grounded, or otherwise lost during 1879.

table of contents
← 1878 / 1879 / 1880 →
Jan	Feb	Mar	Apr
May	Jun	Jul	Aug
Sep	Oct	Nov	Dec
Unknown date

== Unknown date ==
List of shipwrecks: Unknown date 1879
Ship	State	Description
Active	United Kingdom	The steam whaler ran aground "on the New Upernavik Rock" or "near Uppernivik", off the east coast of Greenland in May or June. With assistance from the steam whaler Arctic (United Kingdom), she was refloated two weeks later with no apparent damage.
Covadonga	Chilean Navy	The steam schooner was stranded in the roadstead at Antofagasta, Chile. She was refloated and returned to service.
Conflict	United Kingdom	The East Indiaman was sighted by Carlisle (United Kingdom) whilst on a voyage from Calcutta, India to Hull, Yorkshire. Conflict had apparently been in collision with another vessel. No further trace, presumed foundered with the loss of all 30 crew.
Cunard	United States	The schooner was lost off the Grand Banks in November/December, 1878 or early Winter 1879. lost with all 14 hands.
Gem	United Kingdom	The auxiliary iron schooner was sunk by her crew around March after they had murdered her owner, Francis Cadell. Gem was on a voyage from Ambon Island, Netherlands East Indies to the Kei Islands.
Glencoe	United Kingdom	Refloated after running aground in the Shanghai River, which detained her for a week along with her cargo of the new-season's tea.
Gurtubay	Spain	The steamship was abandoned between 14 October and 12 November. Her crew and four passengers were rescued by the steamship Nederland (Belgium). Gurtubay was on a voyage from Bilbao to New York with ore.
India	Portugal	The ship was abandoned in the Atlantic Ocean after 15 January. She was on a voyage from Rio de Janeiro, Brazil to New York.
Llanedare	United Kingdom	The steamship departed from Gibraltar for an English port in November or December. No further trace, presumed foundered in the Bay of Biscay with the loss of all 30 crew.
Pallas	Sweden	The brig was driven ashore at Galveston, Texas, United States after 5 October. She was later refloated and taken in to Galveston.
Petrel	Flag unknown	The whaling schooner capsized in mid-ocean with the loss of all fourteen crew.
Rookwood	United Kingdom	The ship foundered in the Atlantic Ocean in February or March with the loss of all twenty crew. She was on a voyage from New York to London.
Sarah	United States	The 142-ton two-masted fishing schooner became a total loss in the North Pacific Ocean.
Uncle Sam	United Kingdom	The barque was abandoned between 10 July and 21 August. Her crew were rescued by Queen of Nations (United Kingdom). Uncle Sam was on a voyage from North Sydney, Nova Scotia, Canada to a British port.
William	United Kingdom	The smack was wrecked on the Scroby Sands, Norfolk. Her twelve crew were rescued by the Caister Lifeboat.
