= Sea Girt Light =

Sea Girt Lighthouse
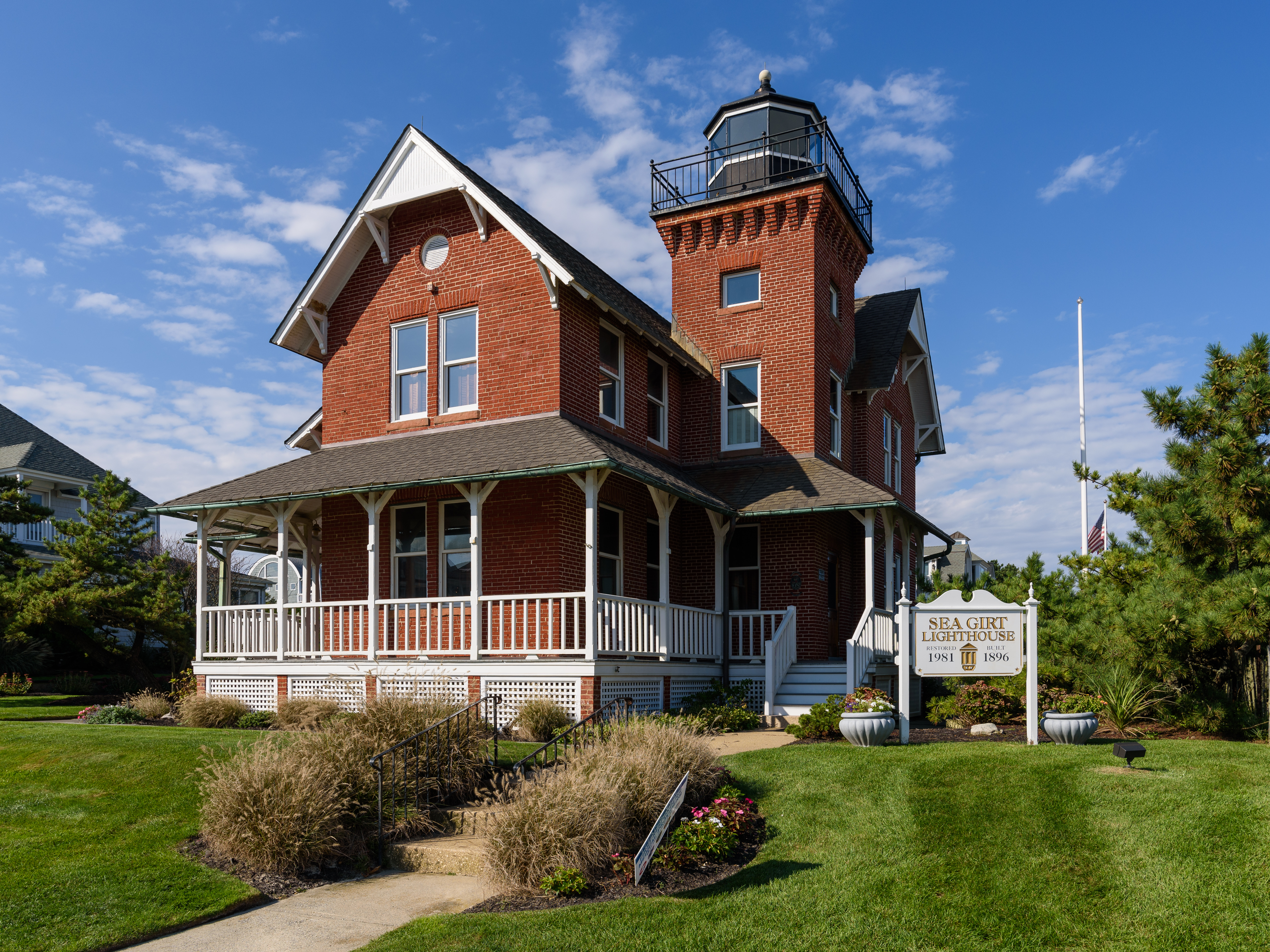
- Location: Sea Girt, New Jersey, U.S.
- Coordinates: 40.1367°N 74.0275°W

Tower
- Constructed: 1896
- Foundation: Brick
- Construction: Brick
- Automated: 1945
- Height: 44 feet (13 m)
- Shape: house with integral tower and lantern

Light
- Deactivated: 1977
- Focal height: 60 feet (18 m)
- Lens: Fourth order Fresnel lens (original), Decorative light (current)

The Sea Girt Light is a decommissioned lighthouse marking the inlet leading to the Wreck Pond in Sea Girt, New Jersey, United States. It is located on a stretch of the New Jersey shore between the Barnegat and Navesink lighthouses. It hosted the first radio beacon mounted in a shore installation in the United States.

== History ==
The New Jersey shore between the Barnegat and Navesink lighthouses, a distance of nearly 40 miles (64 km), was unlit in the 1800s. In 1888 the Lighthouse Board requested funds to establish a light in this area, with an amount of $20,000 being approved the following year (equivalent to $700,000 in 2024). The original site was to be at Manasquan Inlet, just to the south of Sea Girt; however, the site was found to be unsuitable and the present lot was obtained on the beach at Sea Girt, near Wreck Pond. An L-shaped brick house with an integral tower was constructed, and the light was first exhibited on December 10, 1896. This was the last shore lighthouse with an integral keeper's residence built on the east coast of the United States. Moving sand and erosion were problems from early on, but fencing in 1900 and steel pilings in the 1920s arrested the threat.

In 1921 Sea Girt Light was equipped with a radio beacon for use in fog, the first such installation on a shore-based light. It was installed in conjunction with transmitters on the Ambrose and Fire Island lightships; with a radio direction finder, a ship could fix its position accurately through triangulation from the three sites.

At the outset of World War II, the light was deactivated and the lens removed; the house was remodeled to serve as a dormitory for a Coast Guard observation post. At the end of the war, an aerobeacon was mounted atop the tower, with the original lighthouse being decommissioned. In 1955, a new beacon was erected away from the building on a steel tower on the lawn. The lighthouse building was offered to the state, but when they declined, the borough of Sea Girt purchased the lighthouse instead, for $11,000 (equivalent to $129,000 in 2024). It was used for the town library and for meeting space for many years, while the beacon itself remained operational until 1977. In 1980 the care of the building was taken over by the Sea Girt Lighthouse Citizens Committee, an independent non-profit dedicated to restoring and maintaining the lighthouse. This restoration was accomplished, and the building is now available both for tours and for a variety of meetings; the beacon was removed from the external tower and placed in the old lantern, now operated as a private aid to navigation. In 2002 the committee purchased the fourth order Fresnel lens originally used in the Crowdy Head Light in New South Wales, Australia, for $20,000 (equivalent to $35,000 in 2024), a sum nominally equal to that originally appropriated for construction of the light station.
