= G. Michael Brown =

American lawyer (1942–2025)

Gerald Michael Brown (November 3, 1942 – October 6, 2025) was an American gaming regulator in New Jersey who became a lawyer for the gaming industry, and was the chief executive officer of Foxwoods Resort Casino.

== Early life and education ==
Born on November 3, 1942, in Orange, New Jersey, Brown graduated from St. Benedict's Preparatory School, before earning degrees at Franciscan University of Steubenville and the Seton Hall University School of Law, later serving in the United States Army during the Vietnam War.

== Career ==
He began his legal career in 1970 as an assistant prosecutor in Essex County, New Jersey. As assistant state attorney general in a 1980 case, Brown was the lead prosecutor and obtained the convictions of four members of the Genovese crime family on charges including extortion, loan-sharking and robbery, saying that the verdict demonstrated that the Mafia is not merely "a figment of Hollywood's imagination." One of the defendants gave him credit for his legal skills, telling Brown to reach out 'If you ever decide to come over to the other side."

At a 1979 hearing of the New Jersey Casino Control Commission, where Resorts International was seeking approval of the first permanent casino license in Atlantic City, New Jersey, he was asked by a commissioner if the casino operator or its management had any connection to organized crime, to which Brown responded "not at the present time, no".

He served from 1980 to 1982 as director of the New Jersey Division of Gaming Enforcement, which oversees the integrity of the state's casinos and gambling operations, after which he operated a law practice in Atlantic City that focused on gambling regulation.

In 1993, he was hired by the Mashantucket Pequot Tribe to develop and expand what was then known as Foxwoods High Stakes Bingo & Casino on their reservation in Ledyard, Connecticut, expanding it into the Foxwoods Resort Casino. With the state of Connecticut facing financial challenges, he was able to make a deal through the offices of governor Lowell P. Weicker under which the casino would gain authorization to install slot machines at its casino in exchange for the state given 25% of the take, with $100 million a year in revenue guaranteed on an annual basis. The addition of slot machines helped fund a major expansion announced in 1993, that would add a combination 3,000-seat bingo hall / boxing arena / concert hall covering 55,000 square feet (5,100 m^{2}) that would make Foxwoods the largest casino in the country. A resident of Sea Girt, New Jersey, he earned $1.5 million a year while he ran what was considered one of the country's most profitable casinos, before leaving in 1997 in a dispute with the casino's owners related to a perceived conflict of interest that arose after he bought stock in one of the casino's vendors.

As president and part owner of Manhattan Cruises in 1998, his short-lived company offered overnight casino cruises to nowhere from New York City aboard the Edinburgh Castle.

== Death ==
Brown died in Fort Lauderdale, Florida, on October 6, 2025, at the age of 82.
