= Wreck Pond =

Lake of the United States of America

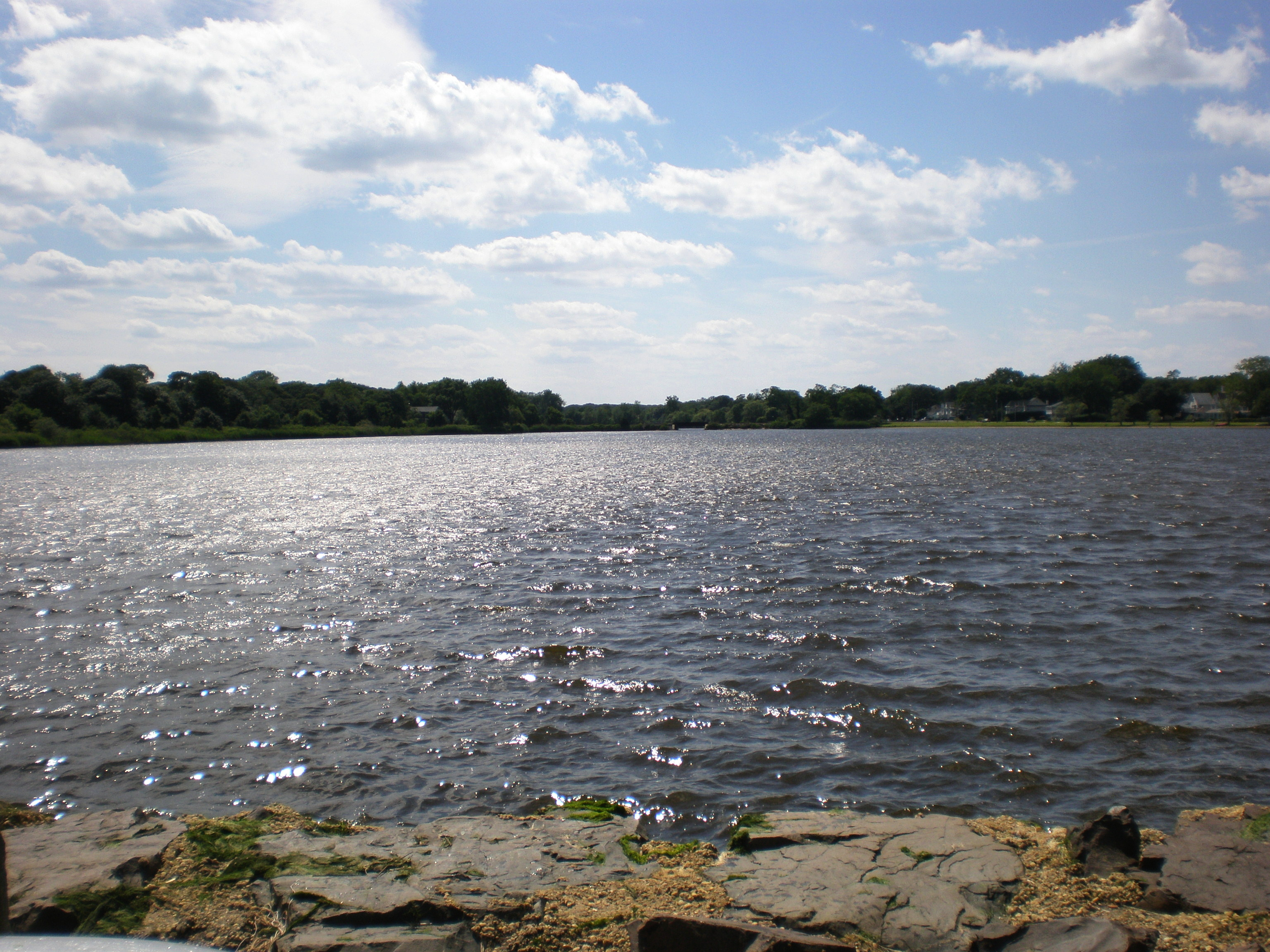
- Wreck Pond in Spring Lake, New Jersey

- Location within New Jersey Location within the United States
- Location: Monmouth County, New Jersey
- Coordinates: 40°08′24″N 74°02′06″W
- Type: Coastal lake
- Primary inflows: Wreck Pond Brook, Hurleys Pond Brook, Hannabrand Brook
- Basin countries: United States
- Surface area: 73 acres (30 ha)

Wreck Pond is a coastal freshwater tidal pond located on the coast of the Atlantic Ocean in Monmouth County, New Jersey, United States. It is surrounded by Wall Township and the boroughs of Spring Lake, Spring Lake Heights, and Sea Girt. The pond was originally connected to the sea by a small inlet and got its name because sailors would mistake it, in the dark, for the Manasquan Inlet, which is further south. This was alleviated by the building of the Sea Girt Lighthouse and stopped by the eventual filling in of the inlet.

The pond is the center of the Wreck Pond Watershed, which covers about 12 square miles (31 km^{2}) in eastern Monmouth County. Its primary feeder streams are Wreck Pond Brook, Hurleys Pond Brook and Hannabrand Brook. Other bodies of water in the watershed include: Hurleys Pond, Osbornes Pond, Albert Pond and Old Mill Pond. It emptied into the Atlantic Ocean through an outfall pipe which regulates the tidal flow in and out of the pond. After Hurricane Sandy, it was discovered that the ocean had restored a natural inlet. An expanded and gated culvert was completed in 2016.

The lower reaches of the pond remain an important spawning ground for anadromous fish species including alewife herrings.

Some of the acres of land surrounding Wreck Pond are under public ownership and are protected from development. Other lands are considered freshwater wetlands and are protected from development by federal and New Jersey laws and regulations. The watershed is part of the South Coast Subwatershed Management Region.

The pond depth has decreased substantially over several years as sediments carried by feeder creeks and increased storm water runoff have settled into it. This has also caused the pond to become choked with fecal coliform bacteria. Much water flowing into the pond from storms causes the pond to flush into the Atlantic Ocean. This, in turn, often causes the closure of ocean beaches in Sea Girt and Spring Lake.

The source of coliform contamination is debated. A recent study conducted by Prof. John Tiedemann of Monmouth University tracked the source of bacterial contaminants in the Wreck Pond Watershed. Tiedemann's group set up and monitored 12 stations throughout the watershed for approximately two years. During this time, they determined that the major source of bacterial coliform contaminants is human waste. These contaminants may be introduced into the waterways via aging sewers, improperly capped septic systems, and illegal sewer connections. Recommendations are being prepared for distribution to municipalities throughout the watershed to assist the governing bodies in remediating problems within their jurisdictions.

The New Jersey Department of Environmental Protection funded a partial dredging of Wreck Pond and the extension of the stormwater runoff pipe about 100 yards (91 m) farther into the ocean. While it was hoped this would prevent pollution from affecting beaches in neighboring towns, it has been determined that the effluvium from the pipe still washes up on local beaches. Additionally, Monmouth County has mandated that after a rainfall of 1/4" or more, the beaches are automatically closed.

The Wreck Pond Watershed Preservation Association, a group of residents, environmental activists and government officials interested in preserving Wreck Pond, meets frequently to discuss issues with preserving the area.

== Sources ==
- Watershed Features In Wall Township
- "Wall Township Master Plan, Environmental Resources" (PDF). (79.9 KB)
