= Spring Lake Heights, New Jersey =

Borough in Monmouth County, New Jersey, US

- Borough
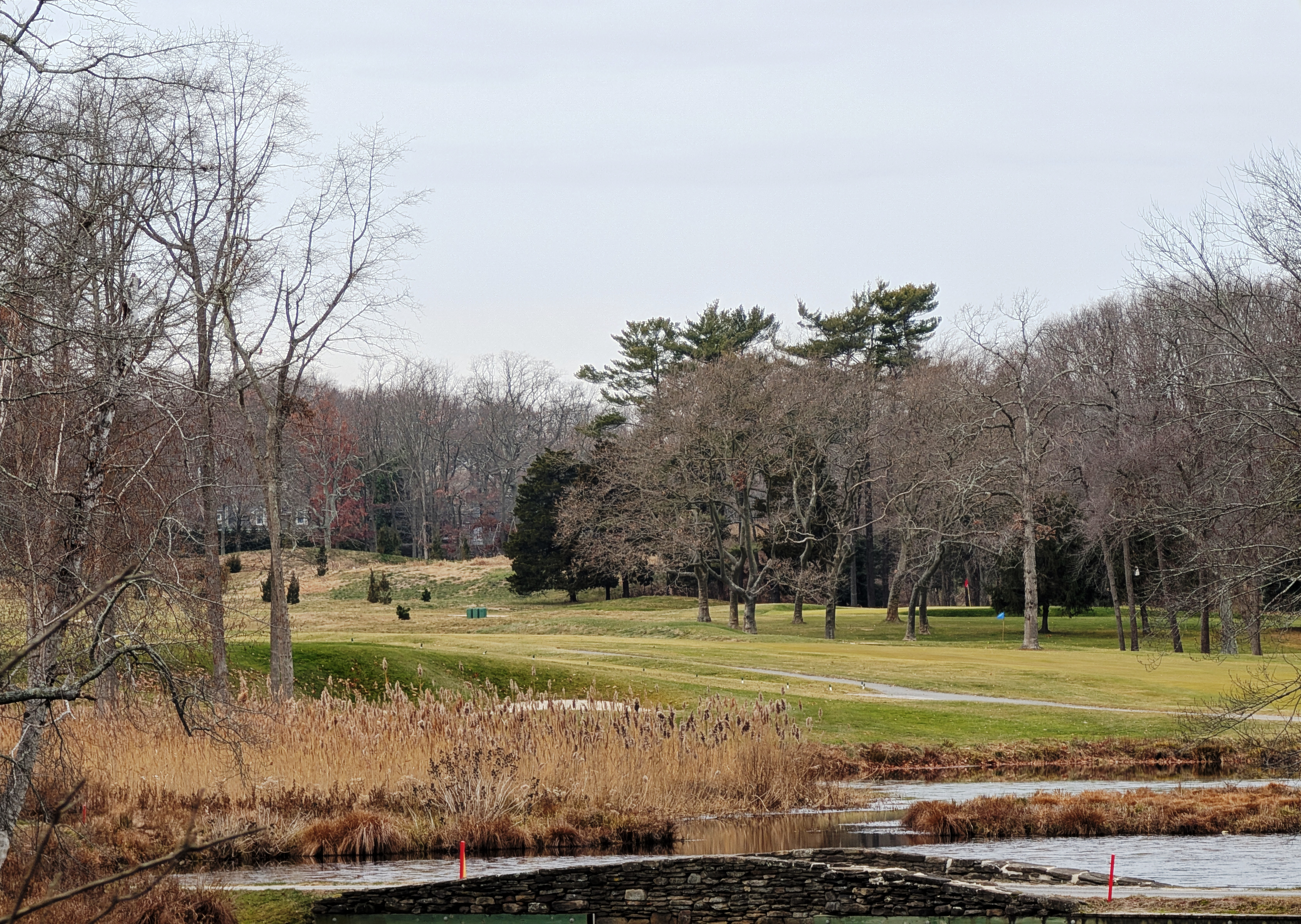
- Spring Lake Golf Club in the borough

- Seal

- Map of Spring Lake Heights in Monmouth County. Inset: Location of Monmouth County highlighted in the State of New Jersey.

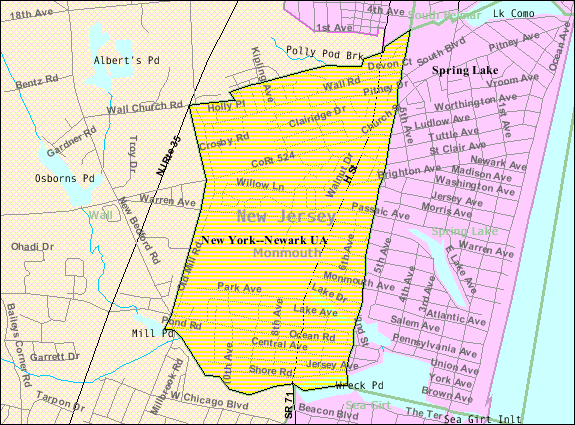
- Census Bureau map of Spring Lake Heights, New Jersey

- Location in Monmouth County Location in New Jersey Location in the United States
- Coordinates: 40.149483°N 74.046169°W
- Country: United States
- State: New Jersey
- County: Monmouth
- Incorporated: March 19, 1927

Government
  - Type: Borough
  - Body: Borough Council
  - Mayor: Christopher M. Campion Jr. (R, term ends December 31, 2027)
  - Administrator: John E. Barrett
  - Municipal clerk: Janine Gillis

Area
  - Total: 1.32 sq mi (3.43 km^{2})
  - Land: 1.29 sq mi (3.35 km^{2})
  - Water: 0.031 sq mi (0.08 km^{2}) 2.26%
  - Rank: 468th of 565 in state 40th of 53 in county
- Elevation: 23 ft (7.0 m)

Population (2020)
  - Total: 4,890
  - Estimate (2023): 4,834
  - Rank: 380th of 565 in state 33rd of 53 in county
  - Density: 3,776.8/sq mi (1,458.2/km^{2})
  - Rank: 173rd of 565 in state 18th of 53 in county
- Time zone: UTC−05:00 (Eastern (EST))
  - Summer (DST): UTC−04:00 (Eastern (EDT))
- ZIP Code: 07762
- Area code: 732 exchanges: 282, 449, 974
- FIPS code: 3402570140
- GNIS feature ID: 0885407
- Website: www.springlakehts.com

Spring Lake Heights is a borough located in the southern coastal portion of Monmouth County, New Jersey, United States. As of the 2020 United States census, the borough's population was 4,890, an increase of 177 (+3.8%) from the 2010 census count of 4,713, which in turn reflected a decline of 514 (−9.8%) from the 5,227 counted in the 2000 census.

The borough of Spring Lake Heights was formed by an act of the New Jersey Legislature on March 19, 1927, from portions of Wall Township, based on the results of a referendum held on May 3, 1927. The borough was named for Spring Lake, which was named for a clear spring-fed lake.

== Geography ==
According to the United States Census Bureau, the borough had a total area of 1.5 square miles (3.43 km^{2}), including 1.30 square miles (3.35 km^{2}) of land and 0.03 square miles (0.08 km^{2}) of water (2.26%).

Wreck Pond is a tidal pond located on the coast of the Atlantic Ocean, surrounded by Wall Township and the boroughs of Spring Lake, Spring Lake Heights, and Sea Girt. The Wreck Pond watershed covers about 12.8 square miles (33 km^{2}) in eastern Monmouth County.

The borough borders the Monmouth County municipalities of Lake Como, Sea Girt, Spring Lake and Wall Township.

Unincorporated communities, localities and place names located partially or completely within the borough include Villa Park.

== Demographics ==
Historical population
Census	Pop.	Note	%±
1930	1,221		—
1940	1,076		−11.9%
1950	1,798		67.1%
1960	3,309		84.0%
1970	4,602		39.1%
1980	5,424		17.9%
1990	5,341		−1.5%
2000	5,227		−2.1%
2010	4,713		−9.8%
2020	4,890		3.8%
2023 (est.)	4,834	▼	−1.1%
Population sources:1930 1940–2000 2000; 2010 2020

=== 2020 census ===
As of the 2020 census, Spring Lake Heights had a population of 4,890. The median age was 53.0 years. 14.7% of residents were under the age of 18 and 29.8% of residents were 65 years of age or older. For every 100 females there were 81.6 males, and for every 100 females age 18 and over there were 78.7 males age 18 and over.

100.0% of residents lived in urban areas, while 0.0% lived in rural areas.

There were 2,428 households in Spring Lake Heights, of which 16.4% had children under the age of 18 living in them. Of all households, 38.8% were married-couple households, 18.3% were households with a male householder and no spouse or partner present, and 37.7% were households with a female householder and no spouse or partner present. About 42.9% of all households were made up of individuals and 23.7% had someone living alone who was 65 years of age or older.

There were 2,998 housing units, of which 19.0% were vacant. The homeowner vacancy rate was 1.6% and the rental vacancy rate was 4.7%.

Racial composition as of the 2020 census
Race	Number	Percent
White	4,537	92.8%
Black or African American	23	0.5%
American Indian and Alaska Native	10	0.2%
Asian	54	1.1%
Native Hawaiian and Other Pacific Islander	2	0.0%
Some other race	59	1.2%
Two or more races	205	4.2%
Hispanic or Latino (of any race)	221	4.5%

=== 2010 census ===
The 2010 United States census counted 4,713 people, 2,316 households, and 1,202 families in the borough. The population density was 3,671.3 per square mile (1,417.5/km^{2}). There were 2,972 housing units at an average density of 2,315.1 per square mile (893.9/km^{2}). The racial makeup was 96.61% (4,553) White, 0.64% (30) Black or African American, 0.15% (7) Native American, 1.08% (51) Asian, 0.02% (1) Pacific Islander, 0.47% (22) from other races, and 1.04% (49) from two or more races. Hispanic or Latino of any race were 3.29% (155) of the population.

Of the 2,316 households, 17.1% had children under the age of 18; 40.3% were married couples living together; 9.5% had a female householder with no husband present and 48.1% were non-families. Of all households, 41.7% were made up of individuals and 21.4% had someone living alone who was 65 years of age or older. The average household size was 2.03 and the average family size was 2.82.

16.5% of the population were under the age of 18, 5.4% from 18 to 24, 20.2% from 25 to 44, 32.0% from 45 to 64, and 25.8% who were 65 years of age or older. The median age was 49.6 years. For every 100 females, the population had 83.9 males. For every 100 females ages 18 and older there were 81.2 males.

The Census Bureau's 2006–2010 American Community Survey showed that (in 2010 inflation-adjusted dollars) median household income was $72,083 (with a margin of error of +/− $10,741) and the median family income was $102,173 (+/− $13,664). Males had a median income of $80,819 (+/− $9,463) versus $56,615 (+/− $7,658) for females. The per capita income for the borough was $43,370 (+/− $4,154). About 1.1% of families and 6.4% of the population were below the poverty line, including 3.0% of those under age 18 and 5.7% of those age 65 or over.

=== 2000 census ===
As of the 2000 United States census, there were 5,227 people, 2,511 households, and 1,358 families residing in the borough. The population density was 3,947.7 inhabitants per square mile (1,524.2/km^{2}). There were 2,950 housing units at an average density of 2,228.0 per square mile (860.2/km^{2}). The racial makeup of the borough was 97.28% White, 1.11% African American, 0.02% Native American, 0.36% Asian, 0.02% Pacific Islander, 0.67% from other races, and 0.54% from two or more races. Hispanic or Latino of any race were 2.12% of the population.

As of the 2000 Census, 32.7% of Spring Lake Heights residents were of Irish ancestry, the 16th-highest percentage of any municipality in the United States, and fifth-highest in New Jersey, among all places with more than 1,000 residents identifying their ancestry.

There were 2,511 households, out of which 17.5% had children under the age of 18 living with them, 42.6% were married couples living together, 9.2% had a female householder with no husband present, and 45.9% were non-families. 41.7% of all households were made up of individuals, and 22.7% had someone living alone who was 65 years of age or older. The average household size was 2.04 and the average family size was 2.82.

In the borough the population was spread out, with 16.8% under the age of 18, 4.4% from 18 to 24, 23.7% from 25 to 44, 25.4% from 45 to 64, and 29.6% who were 65 years of age or older. The median age was 48 years. For every 100 females, there were 81.4 males. For every 100 females age 18 and over, there were 76.6 males.

The median income for a household in the borough was $51,330, and the median income for a family was $64,345. Males had a median income of $48,640 versus $40,363 for females. The per capita income for the borough was $35,093. About 4.2% of families and 7.5% of the population were below the poverty line, including 11.9% of those under age 18 and 7.1% of those age 65 or over.

== Government ==
=== Local government ===
Spring Lake Heights is governed under the borough form of New Jersey municipal government, which is used in 218 municipalities (of the 564) statewide, making it the most common form of government in New Jersey. The governing body is comprised of the mayor and the borough council, with all positions elected at-large on a partisan basis as part of the November general election. The mayor is elected directly by the voters to a four-year term of office. The borough council includes six members elected to serve three-year terms on a staggered basis, with two seats coming up for election each year in a three-year cycle. The borough form of government used by Spring Lake Heights is a "weak mayor / strong council" government in which council members act as the legislative body with the mayor presiding at meetings and voting only in the event of a tie. The mayor can veto ordinances subject to an override by a two-thirds majority vote of the council. Most appointments are made by the mayor with the advice and consent of the council.

As of 2023, the mayor of Spring Lake Heights is Republican Christopher M. Campion Jr., whose term of office ends December 31, 2027. Members of the borough council are Council President William K. Graetz (R, 2025), Leonard Capristo (R, 2027), John C. Casagrande (R, 2026), Michele Degnan-Spang (R, 2026), Sara King (R, 2027) and Christopher C. Willms (R, 2025).

In October 2022, the borough council appointed Michele Degnan-Spang to fill the seat expiring in December 2023 that had been held by Peter A. Gallo Jr.

In January 2016, the borough council selected Arthur Herner from three candidates nominated by the Democratic municipal committee to fill the seat expiring in December 2016 that had been held by Thomas O'Brien until he took office as mayor.

In January 2020, the borough council selected John Casagrande from three candidates nominated by the Republican municipal committee to fill the seat expiring in December 2020 that had been held by Christopher Campion until he took office as mayor.

=== Federal, state and county representation ===
Spring Lake Heights is located in the 4th Congressional District and is part of New Jersey's 10th state legislative district.

For the 119th United States Congress, New Jersey's 4th congressional district is represented by Chris Smith (R, Manchester Township). New Jersey is represented in the United States Senate by Democrats Cory Booker (Newark, term ends 2027) and Andy Kim (Moorestown, term ends 2031).

For the 2026–2027 session, the 10th legislative district of the New Jersey Legislature is represented in the State Senate by James W. Holzapfel (R, Toms River) and in the General Assembly by Paul Kanitra (R, Point Pleasant Beach) and Gregory P. McGuckin (R, Toms River).

Monmouth County is governed by a Board of County Commissioners composed of five members who are elected at-large to serve three-year terms of office on a staggered basis, with either one or two seats up for election each year as part of the November general election. At an annual reorganization meeting held in the beginning of January, the board selects one of its members to serve as director and another as deputy director.

As of 2025, Monmouth County's Commissioners are Director Thomas A. Arnone (R, Neptune City, 2025), Susan M. Kiley (R, Hazlet Township, 2027), Erik Anderson (R, Shrewsbury, 2026), Nick DiRocco (R, Wall Township, 2025), and Deputy Director Ross F. Licitra (R, Marlboro Township, 2026).

Constitutional officers elected on a countywide basis are Clerk Christine Giordano Hanlon (R, 2025; Ocean Township), Sheriff Shaun Golden (R, 2025; Howell Township) and Surrogate Rosemarie D. Peters (R, 2026; Middletown Township).

=== Politics ===
United States presidential election results for Spring Lake Heights
Year	Republican		Democratic		Third party(ies)	
Year	No.	%	No.	%	No.	%
2024	1,689	52.67%	1,453	45.31%	65	2.03%
2020	1,714	52.08%	1,548	47.04%	29	0.88%
2016	1,639	56.85%	1,150	39.89%	94	3.26%
2012	1,481	73.64%	514	25.56%	16	0.80%
2008	1,602	69.71%	676	29.42%	20	0.87%
2004	1,777	58.74%	1,223	40.43%	25	0.83%
2000	1,626	54.82%	1,204	40.59%	136	4.59%
1996	1,300	48.36%	1,134	42.19%	254	9.45%
1992	1,516	51.48%	964	32.73%	465	15.79%

As of March 2011, there were a total of 3,635 registered voters in Spring Lake Heights, of which 976 (26.9%) were registered as Democrats, 1,106 (30.4%) were registered as Republicans and 1,549 (42.6%) were registered as Unaffiliated. There were 4 voters registered as Libertarians or Greens.

In the 2012 presidential election, Republican Mitt Romney received 56.3% of the vote (1,481 cast), ahead of Democrat Barack Obama with 42.6% (1,122 votes), and other candidates with 1.1% (28 votes), among the 2,654 ballots cast by the borough's 3,811 registered voters (23 ballots were spoiled), for a turnout of 69.6%. In the 2008 presidential election, Republican John McCain received 64.4% of the vote (1,326 cast), ahead of Democrat Barack Obama with 32.8% (676 votes) and other candidates with 1.0% (20 votes), among the 2,059 ballots cast by the borough's 2,692 registered voters, for a turnout of 76.5%. In the 2004 presidential election, Republican George W. Bush received 64.0% of the vote (1,427 ballots cast), outpolling Democrat John Kerry with 30.1% (670 votes) and other candidates with 1.0% (30 votes), among the 2,229 ballots cast by the borough's 2,873 registered voters, for a turnout percentage of 77.6.

Gubernatorial election results for Spring Lake Heights
Year	Republican		Democratic		Third party(ies)	
Year	No.	%	No.	%	No.	%
2025	1,476	53.54%	1,275	46.25%	6	0.22%
2021	1,383	58.90%	956	40.72%	9	0.38%
2017	1,106	56.95%	795	40.94%	41	2.11%
2013	1,365	71.54%	491	25.73%	52	2.73%
2009	1,344	63.88%	609	28.94%	151	7.18%
2005	1,242	55.20%	923	41.02%	85	3.78%

In the 2013 gubernatorial election, Republican Chris Christie received 71.5% of the vote (1,365 cast), ahead of Democrat Barbara Buono with 25.7% (491 votes), and other candidates with 2.7% (52 votes), among the 1,942 ballots cast by the borough's 3,831 registered voters (34 ballots were spoiled), for a turnout of 50.7%.

United States Senate election results for Spring Lake Heights1
Year	Republican		Democratic		Third party(ies)	
Year	No.	%	No.	%	No.	%
2024	1,676	53.80%	1,385	44.46%	54	1.73%
2018	1,444	58.18%	939	37.83%	99	3.99%
2012	1,427	56.72%	1,057	42.01%	32	1.27%
2006	1,261	58.82%	827	38.57%	56	2.61%

United States Senate election results for Spring Lake Heights2
Year	Republican		Democratic		Third party(ies)	
Year	No.	%	No.	%	No.	%
2020	1,762	53.46%	1,484	45.02%	50	1.52%
2014	954	56.35%	696	41.11%	43	2.54%
2013	761	59.36%	510	39.78%	11	0.86%
2008	1,565	58.03%	1,074	39.82%	58	2.15%

== Education ==
The Spring Lake Heights School District, located on a 12-acre (49,000 m^{2}) campus, serves public school students in pre-kindergarten through eighth grade at Spring Lake Heights Elementary School. As of the 2023–24 school year, the district, comprised of one school, had an enrollment of 266 students and 40.3 classroom teachers (on an FTE basis), for a student–teacher ratio of 6.6:1.

Public school students in ninth through twelfth grades attend Manasquan High School in Manasquan, as part of a sending/receiving relationship with the Manasquan Public Schools. Manasquan High School also serves students from Avon-by-the-Sea, Belmar, Brielle, Lake Como, Sea Girt and Spring Lake, who attend Manasquan High School as part of sending/receiving relationships with their respective districts. As of the 2023–24 school year, the high school had an enrollment of 945 students and 81.2 classroom teachers (on an FTE basis), for a student–teacher ratio of 11.6:1.

Students from the borough, and all of Monmouth County, are eligible to attend one of the magnet schools in the Monmouth County Vocational School District—Marine Academy of Science and Technology, Academy of Allied Health & Science, High Technology High School, Biotechnology High School, and Communications High School.

Spring Lake Heights students are also served by Saint Catharine School (grades K–8) in Spring Lake and St. Rose High School (9–12) in Belmar, which operate under the auspices of the Roman Catholic Diocese of Trenton.

== Transportation ==
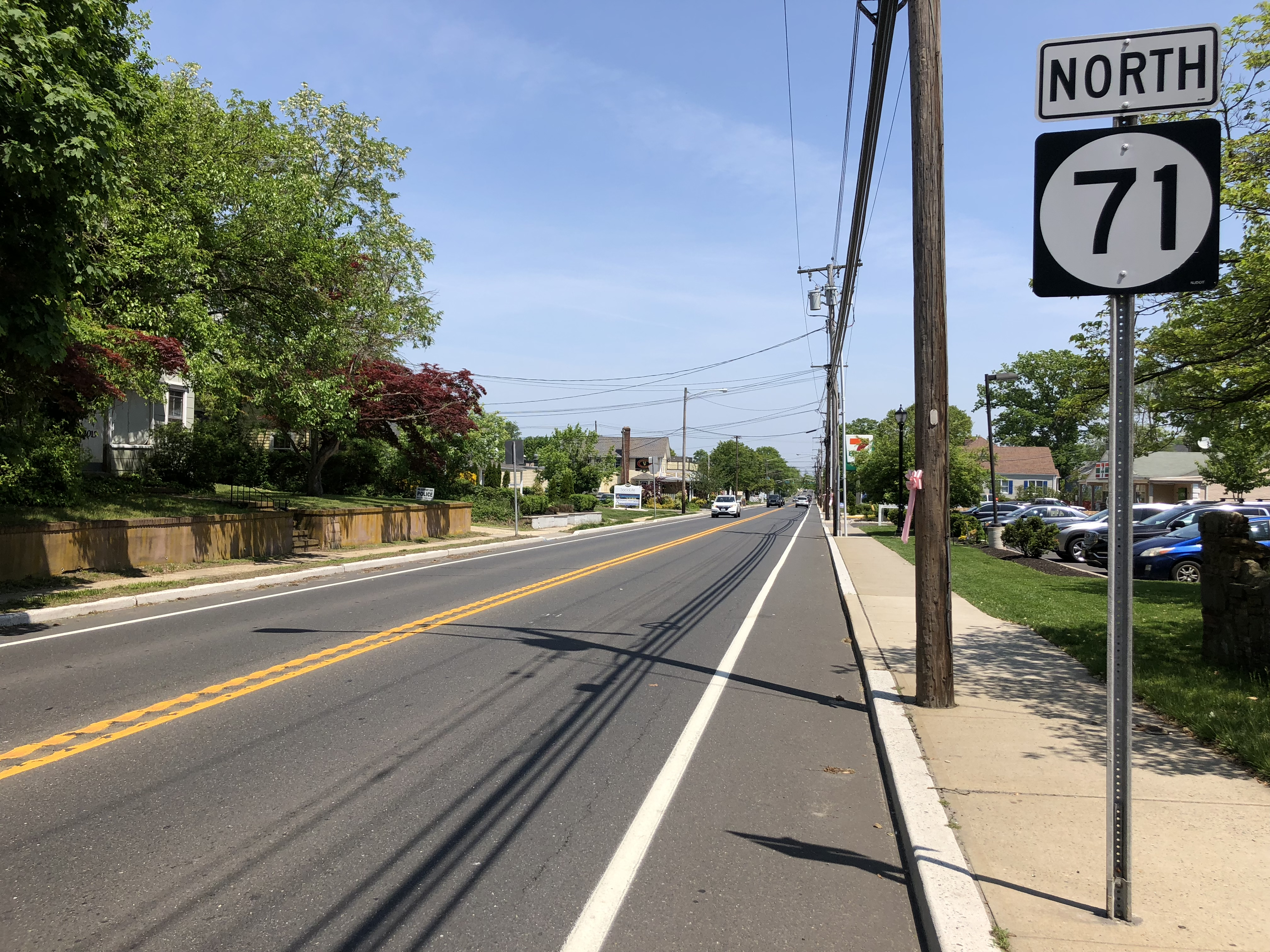
Route 71 in Spring Lake Heights

=== Roads and highways ===
As of May 2010, the borough had a total of 18.78 miles (30.22 km) of roadways, of which 15.63 miles (25.15 km) were maintained by the municipality, 1.48 miles (2.38 km) by Monmouth County and 1.67 miles (2.69 km) by the New Jersey Department of Transportation.

Route 71 is the only state highway which traverses the borough. It follows Seventh Avenue from Sea Girt in the south to Wall Township in the north. County Route 524 (Allaire Road) heads across Spring Lake Heights from Wall Township in the west to its eastern terminus where it meets Route 71 in the eastern portion of the borough. Route 35 just misses the northwest corner of the borough.

=== Public transportation ===
NJ Transit offers passenger train service at the Spring Lake station. Commuter service is provided on the North Jersey Coast Line, offering express and local service. Diesel service operates from Hoboken Terminal to Bay Head station. Electric service operates from New York Penn Station to Long Branch station, where the electrified portion of the line ends. Mid-line stations include Newark Penn Station, Newark Liberty International Airport Station, and Secaucus Junction.

NJ Transit bus service is available between the borough and Philadelphia on the 317 route, with local service offered on the 830 route.

== Notable people ==
People who were born in, residents of, or otherwise closely associated with Spring Lake Heights include:

- John Amabile (1939–2012), football coach and scout
- Anthony T. Augelli (1902–1985), United States federal judge
- Thomas B. Considine (born 1964) Commissioner of the New Jersey Department of Banking and Insurance from 2010 to 2012
- Barbara Friedrich (born 1949), gold medalist in javelin at 1967 Pan American Games who set the US record at 198 feet 8 1/2 inches (60.566 m)
- James J. Howard (1927–1988), represented New Jersey's 3rd congressional district in the United States House of Representatives from 1965 to 1988
- Joseph P. Lordi (1919–1983), Essex County prosecutor and first chairman of the New Jersey Casino Control Commission
- Balls Mahoney (1972–2016), professional wrestler
- Thomas McLernon (c. 1906–1986), general manager of the New York City Transit Authority and the Massachusetts Bay Transportation Authority
- Valentina Sánchez (born 1995), model, television producer and beauty pageant titleholder
