= Manasquan Public Schools =

School district in Monmouth County, New Jersey, US

Address
- 169 Broad Street Manasquan, Monmouth County, New Jersey, 08736; United States
- Coordinates: 40.128524°N 74.047992°W

District information
- Grades: K-12
- Superintendent: Robert Goodall
- Business administrator: Peter Crawley
- Schools: 2

Students and staff
- Enrollment: 1,470 (as of 2022–23)
- Faculty: 146.4 FTEs
- Student–teacher ratio: 10.0:1

Other information
- District Factor Group: GH
- Website: www.manasquanschools.org
Ind.	Per pupil	District spending	Rank (*)	K-12 average	%± vs. average
1A	Total Spending	$17,678	24	$18,891	−6.4%
1	Budgetary Cost	13,529	21	14,783	−8.5%
2	Classroom Instruction	7,646	17	8,763	−12.7%
6	Support Services	2,206	32	2,392	−7.8%
8	Administrative Cost	1,677	25	1,485	12.9%
10	Operations & Maintenance	1,465	17	1,783	−17.8%
13	Extracurricular Activities	535	35	268	99.6%
16	Median Teacher Salary	56,400	14	64,043
Data from NJDoE 2014 Taxpayers' Guide to Education Spending. *Of K-12 districts with up to 1,800 students. Lowest spending=1; Highest=49

The Manasquan Public Schools is a comprehensive community public school district that serves students from kindergarten through twelfth grade from Manasquan, in Monmouth County, in the U.S. state of New Jersey.

As of the 2022–23 school year, the district, comprised of two schools, had an enrollment of 1,470 students and 146.4 classroom teachers (on an FTE basis), for a student–teacher ratio of 10.0:1.

The district had been classified by the New Jersey Department of Education as being in District Factor Group "GH", the third-highest of eight groupings. District Factor Groups organize districts statewide to allow comparison by common socioeconomic characteristics of the local districts. From lowest socioeconomic status to highest, the categories are A, B, CD, DE, FG, GH, I and J.

In addition to students from Manasquan, the district's high school also serves public school students from Avon-by-the-Sea, Belmar, Brielle, Lake Como, Sea Girt, Spring Lake, and Spring Lake Heights, who attend Manasquan High School as part of sending/receiving relationships with their respective districts.

The two Manasquan public school buildings are across from each other on Broad Street, with board of education offices next door to the high school.

== Schools ==
Schools in the district (with 2022–23 enrollment data from the National Center for Education Statistics) are:

Elementary school

- Manasquan Elementary School with 499 students in grades K-8
  - Megan Manetta, principal

High school

- Manasquan High School with 948 students in grades 9-12
  - Matthew Kukoda, principal

== Administration ==
Core members of the district's administration are:

- Robert Goodall, superintendent
- Peter Crawley, business administrator and board secretary

== Board of education ==
The district's board of education, comprised of nine members, sets policy and oversees the fiscal and educational operation of the district through its administration. As a Type II school district, the board's trustees are elected directly by voters to serve three-year terms of office on a staggered basis, with three seats up for election each year held (since 2012) as part of the November general election. The board appoints a superintendent to oversee the district's day-to-day operations and a business administrator to supervise the business functions of the district. The sending districts of Belmar, Brielle and Sea Girt each appoint a representative to serve on the Manasquan school board who are eligible to vote on matters related to the high school.
