= Sea Girt, New Jersey =

Borough in Monmouth County, New Jersey

- Borough
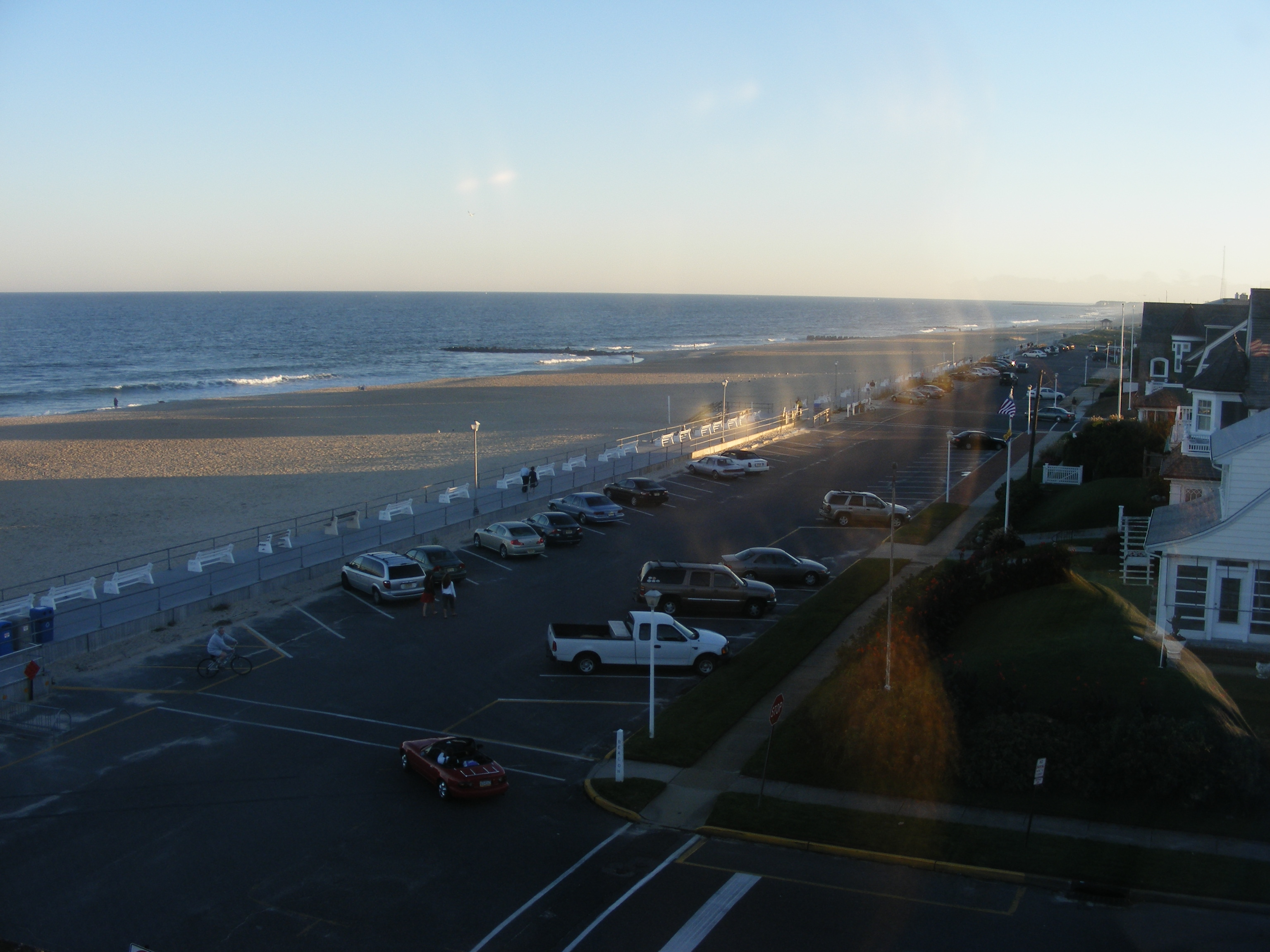
- Sunset over the beach at Sea Girt

- Seal
- Motto: Where the Cedars Meet the Sea
- Map of Sea Girt in Monmouth County. Inset: Location of Monmouth County highlighted in the State of New Jersey.

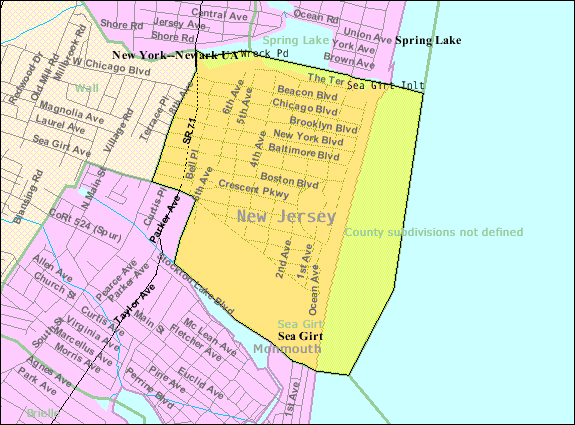
- Census Bureau map of Sea Girt, New Jersey

- Location in Monmouth County Location in New Jersey Location in the United States
- Coordinates: 40.130°N 74.035°W
- Country: United States
- State: New Jersey
- County: Monmouth
- Incorporated: May 1, 1917
- Named for: Estate of Comm. Robert F. Stockton

Government
  - Type: Borough
  - Body: Borough Council
  - Mayor: Donald Fetzer (R, term ending December 31, 2027)
  - Administrator: Justin Macko
  - Municipal clerk: Dawn Harriman

Area
  - Total: 1.46 sq mi (3.77 km^{2})
  - Land: 1.06 sq mi (2.75 km^{2})
  - Water: 0.40 sq mi (1.03 km^{2}) 27.12%
  - Rank: 455th of 565 in state 37th of 53 in county
- Elevation: 13 ft (4.0 m)

Population (2020)
  - Total: 1,866
  - Estimate (2023): 1,841
  - Rank: 491st of 565 in state 43rd of 53 in county
  - Density: 1,759.8/sq mi (679.5/km^{2})
  - Rank: 311th of 565 in state 39th of 53 in county
- Time zone: UTC−05:00 (Eastern (EST))
  - Summer (DST): UTC−04:00 (Eastern (EDT))
- ZIP Code: 08750
- Area code: 732 exchanges: 282, 449, 974
- FIPS code: 3402566330
- GNIS feature ID: 0885388
- Website: www.seagirt-nj.gov

Sea Girt is a borough situated on the Jersey Shore, within Monmouth County, in the U.S. state of New Jersey. As of the 2020 United States census, the borough's population was 1,866, an increase of 38 (+2.1%) from the 2010 census count of 1,828, which in turn had reflected a decline of 320 (−14.9%) from the 2,148 counted in the 2000 census.

In the Forbes magazine 2012 rankings of "America's Most Expensive ZIP Codes", the borough was ranked 197th, with a median price of $1,135,184.

== History ==
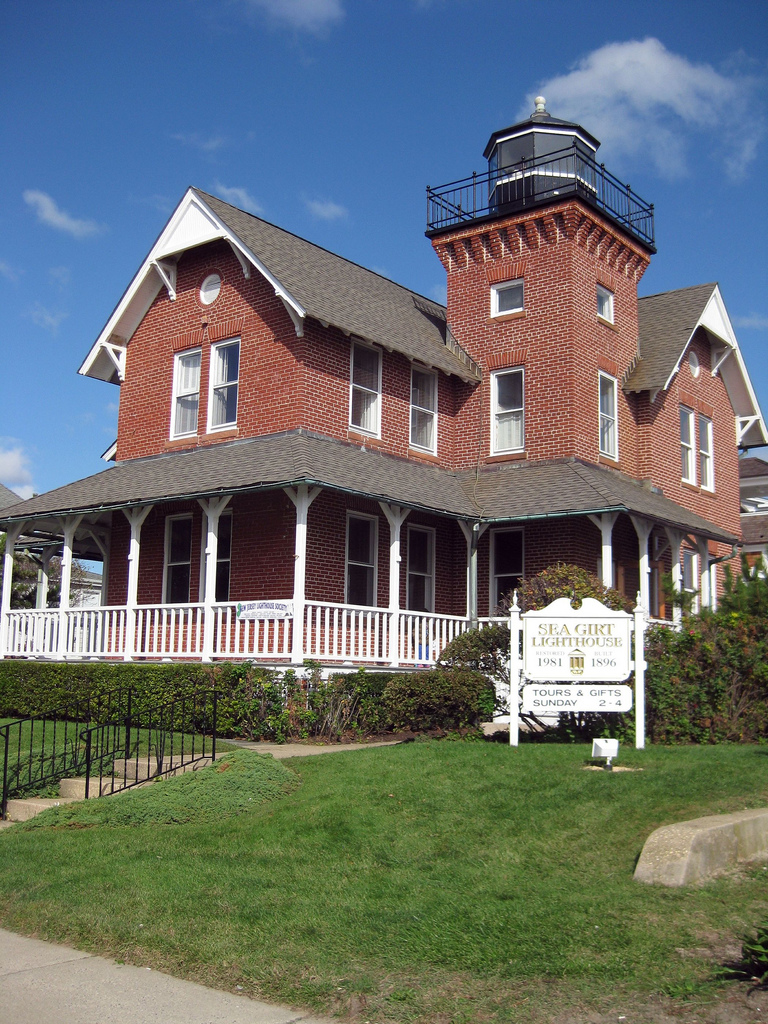
The historic Sea Girt Light

Sea Girt was formed as a borough by an act of the New Jersey Legislature on March 29, 1917, from portions of Wall Township, based on the results of a referendum held on May 1, 1917. The borough was named for the estate of Comm. Robert F. Stockton, who had purchased a property in the area in 1853.

On April 1, 2023, a brief tornado that was part of a tornado outbreak measured EF2 on the Enhanced Fujita scale with winds estimated at 110 to 120 miles per hour (180 to 190 km/h). It blew off the roof of the New Jersey Youth Challenge Academy, with debris strewn up to 250 yards (230 m). Power poles were also damaged and a tree was uprooted.

== Geography ==
According to the United States Census Bureau, the borough had a total area of 1.46 square miles (3.77 km^{2}), including 1.06 square miles (2.75 km^{2}) of land and 0.40 square miles (1.03 km^{2}) of water (27.12%).

Wreck Pond is a tidal pond located on the coast of the Atlantic Ocean, surrounded by Wall Township and the boroughs of Sea Girt, Spring Lake and Spring Lake Heights. The Wreck Pond watershed covers about 12.8 square miles (33 km^{2}) in eastern Monmouth County.

The borough borders the Monmouth County municipalities of Manasquan, Spring Lake, Spring Lake Heights and Wall Township.

== Demographics ==
Historical population
Census	Pop.	Note	%±
1920	110		—
1930	386		250.9%
1940	599		55.2%
1950	1,178		96.7%
1960	1,798		52.6%
1970	2,207		22.7%
1980	2,650		20.1%
1990	2,099		−20.8%
2000	2,148		2.3%
2010	1,828		−14.9%
2020	1,866		2.1%
2023 (est.)	1,841	▼	−1.3%
Population sources: 1920 1920–1930; 1940–2000 2000; 2010 2020

=== 2010 census ===
The 2010 United States census counted 1,828 people, 823 households, and 546 families in the borough. The population density was 1,729.6 per square mile (667.8/km^{2}). There were 1,291 housing units at an average density of 1,221.5 per square mile (471.6/km^{2}). The racial makeup was 99.12% (1,812) White, 0.00% (0) Black or African American, 0.00% (0) Native American, 0.22% (4) Asian, 0.00% (0) Pacific Islander, 0.22% (4) from other races, and 0.44% (8) from two or more races. Hispanic or Latino of any race were 1.64% (30) of the population.

Of the 823 households, 20.7% had children under the age of 18; 58.1% were married couples living together; 6.7% had a female householder with no husband present and 33.7% were non-families. Of all households, 30.7% were made up of individuals and 18.6% had someone living alone who was 65 years of age or older. The average household size was 2.22 and the average family size was 2.77.

19.2% of the population were under the age of 18, 3.8% from 18 to 24, 11.4% from 25 to 44, 35.7% from 45 to 64, and 29.9% who were 65 years of age or older. The median age was 53.5 years. For every 100 females, the population had 88.6 males. For every 100 females ages 18 and older there were 81.0 males.

The Census Bureau's 2006–2010 American Community Survey showed that (in 2010 inflation-adjusted dollars) median household income was $96,652 (with a margin of error of +/− $10,474) and the median family income was $150,179 (+/− $26,605). Males had a median income of $118,958 (+/− $48,899) versus $51,953 (+/− $12,836) for females. The per capita income for the borough was $63,422 (+/− $10,659). About 0.9% of families and 4.3% of the population were below the poverty line, including none of those under age 18 and 5.1% of those age 65 or over.

=== 2000 census ===
As of the 2000 United States census there were 2,148 people, 942 households, and 636 families residing in the borough. The population density was 2,026.9 inhabitants per square mile (782.6/km^{2}). There were 1,285 housing units at an average density of 1,212.5 per square mile (468.1/km^{2}). The racial makeup of the borough was 99.12% White, 0.09% African American, 0.28% Asian, 0.05% from other races, and 0.47% from two or more races. Hispanic or Latino of any race were 1.40% of the population.

As of the 2000 Census, 34.1% of Sea Girt residents were of Irish ancestry, the 10th-highest percentage of any municipality in the United States, and fourth-highest in New Jersey, among all places with more than 1,000 residents identifying their ancestry.

There were 942 households, out of which 20.8% had children under the age of 18 living with them, 59.1% were married couples living together, 7.1% had a female householder with no husband present, and 32.4% were non-families. 29.6% of all households were made up of individuals, and 17.6% had someone living alone who was 65 years of age or older. The average household size was 2.28 and the average family size was 2.83.

In the borough the population was spread out, with 20.1% under the age of 18, 3.7% from 18 to 24, 18.5% from 25 to 44, 30.2% from 45 to 64, and 27.5% who were 65 years of age or older. The median age was 50 years. For every 100 females, there were 87.3 males. For every 100 females age 18 and over, there were 82.6 males.

The median income for a household in the borough was $86,104, and the median income for a family was $102,680. Males had a median income of $100,000 versus $46,667 for females. The per capita income for the borough was $63,871. About 2.1% of families and 3.5% of the population were below the poverty line, including 7.9% of those under age 18 and 1.9% of those age 65 or over.

== Government ==
=== Local government ===
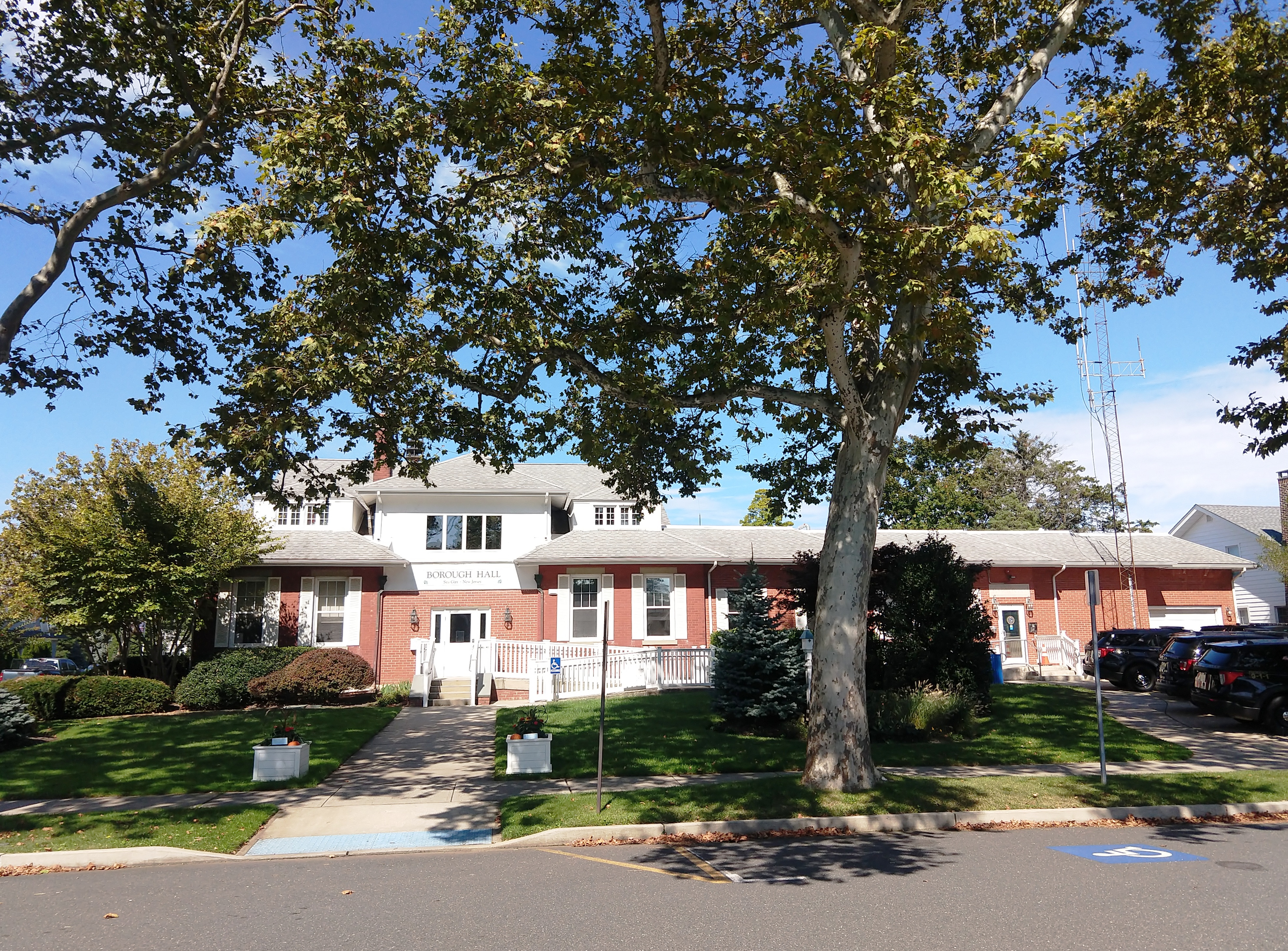
Sea Girt Borough Hall and Police Department

Sea Girt is governed under the borough form of New Jersey municipal government, which is used in 218 municipalities (of the 564) statewide, making it the most common form of government in New Jersey. The governing body is comprised of the mayor and the borough council, with all positions elected at-large on a partisan basis as part of the November general election. A mayor is elected directly by the voters to a four-year term of office. The borough council includes six members elected to serve three-year terms on a staggered basis, with two seats coming up for election each year in a three-year cycle. The borough form of government used by Sea Girt is a "weak mayor / strong council" government in which council members act as the legislative body with the mayor presiding at meetings and voting only in the event of a tie. The mayor can veto ordinances subject to an override by a two-thirds majority vote of the council. The mayor makes committee and liaison assignments for council members, and most appointments are made by the mayor with the advice and consent of the council.

As of 2025, the mayor of Sea Girt Borough is Republican Donald E. Fetzer, whose term of office ending December 31, 2027. Members of the Borough Council are Council President Diane R. Anthony (R, 2026), Hillary DiFeo (R, 2026), Tom Downey (R, 2025), Bryan Perry (R, 2025), Maria Richman (R, 2027) and Alan J. Zakin (R, 2027).

In August 2021, the borough council selected Donald E. Fetzer from a list of three candidates nominated by the Republican municipal committee to fill the mayoral term ending in December 2023 that had been held by Francis K. "Ken" Farrell until his resignation from office the previous month. Fetzer served on an interim basis until the November 2021 general election, when he was chosen to serve the balance of the term of office.

In June 2019, the borough council appointed Mark Clemmensen to fill the seat expiring in December 2020 that had been held by William Foley until he left office. Matthew Begley was appointed to fill the seat expiring in December 2021 that had been held by Anne B. Morris.

On April 5, 2006, the borough council retained a local government consulting firm to review the administrative operations of the borough and to make recommendations for restructuring and efficiency improvements. Among the recommendations accepted by the council was the decision to restructure the Municipal Clerk, Finance and Administration Departments and to create for the first time the office of Borough Administrator (who would serve as the municipality's Chief Administrative Officer).

=== Federal, state and county representation ===
Sea Girt is located in the 4th Congressional District and is part of New Jersey's 10th state legislative district.

For the 119th United States Congress, New Jersey's 4th congressional district is represented by Chris Smith (R, Manchester Township). New Jersey is represented in the United States Senate by Democrats Cory Booker (Newark, term ends 2027) and Andy Kim (Moorestown, term ends 2031).

For the 2026–2027 session, the 10th legislative district of the New Jersey Legislature is represented in the State Senate by James W. Holzapfel (R, Toms River) and in the General Assembly by Paul Kanitra (R, Point Pleasant Beach) and Gregory P. McGuckin (R, Toms River).

Monmouth County is governed by a Board of County Commissioners composed of five members who are elected at-large to serve three-year terms of office on a staggered basis, with either one or two seats up for election each year as part of the November general election. At an annual reorganization meeting held in the beginning of January, the board selects one of its members to serve as director and another as deputy director.

As of 2025, Monmouth County's Commissioners are Director Thomas A. Arnone (R, Neptune City, 2025), Susan M. Kiley (R, Hazlet Township, 2027), Erik Anderson (R, Shrewsbury, 2026), Nick DiRocco (R, Wall Township, 2025), and Deputy Director Ross F. Licitra (R, Marlboro Township, 2026).

Constitutional officers elected on a countywide basis are Clerk Christine Giordano Hanlon (R, 2025; Ocean Township), Sheriff Shaun Golden (R, 2025; Howell Township) and Surrogate Rosemarie D. Peters (R, 2026; Middletown Township).

=== Politics ===
United States presidential election results for Sea Girt
Year	Republican		Democratic		Third party(ies)	
Year	No.	%	No.	%	No.	%
1992	786	63.34%	276	22.24%	179	14.42%
1996	778	67.83%	291	25.37%	78	6.80%
2000	943	71.28%	334	25.25%	46	3.48%
2004	962	72.82%	354	26.80%	5	0.38%
2008	849	66.64%	414	32.50%	11	0.86%
2012	832	73.18%	294	25.86%	11	0.97%
2016	808	66.18%	345	28.26%	68	5.57%
2020	871	58.73%	588	39.65%	24	1.62%
2024	882	62.29%	507	35.81%	27	1.91%

As of March 2011, there were a total of 1,611 registered voters in Sea Girt, of which 210 (13.0%) were registered as Democrats, 808 (50.2%) were registered as Republicans and 592 (36.7%) were registered as Unaffiliated. There was one voter registered to another party.

In the 2012 presidential election, Republican Mitt Romney received 73.2% of the vote (832 cast), ahead of Democrat Barack Obama with 25.9% (294 votes), and other candidates with 1.0% (11 votes), among the 1,146 ballots cast by the borough's 1,624 registered voters (9 ballots were spoiled), for a turnout of 70.6%. In the 2008 presidential election, Republican John McCain received 65.8% of the vote (849 cast), ahead of Democrat Barack Obama with 32.1% (414 votes) and other candidates with 0.9% (11 votes), among the 1,290 ballots cast by the borough's 1,695 registered voters, for a turnout of 76.1%. In the 2004 presidential election, Republican George W. Bush received 72.5% of the vote (962 ballots cast), outpolling Democrat John Kerry with 26.7% (354 votes) and other candidates with 0.3% (5 votes), among the 1,326 ballots cast by the borough's 1,749 registered voters, for a turnout percentage of 75.8.

Gubernatorial election results for Sea Girt
Year	Republican		Democratic		Third party(ies)	
Year	No.	%	No.	%	No.	%
2025	860	68.75%	387	30.94%	4	0.32%
2021	770	70.38%	316	28.88%	8	0.73%
2017	592	73.00%	213	26.26%	6	0.74%
2013	789	84.66%	126	13.52%	17	1.82%
2009	765	76.50%	185	18.50%	50	5.00%
2005	668	71.98%	237	25.54%	23	2.48%

In the 2013 gubernatorial election, Republican Chris Christie received 84.7% of the vote (789 cast), ahead of Democrat Barbara Buono with 13.5% (126 votes), and other candidates with 1.8% (17 votes), among the 951 ballots cast by the borough's 1,637 registered voters (19 ballots were spoiled), for a turnout of 58.1%. In the 2009 gubernatorial election, Republican Chris Christie received 76.0% of the vote (765 ballots cast), ahead of Democrat Jon Corzine with 18.4% (185 votes), Independent Chris Daggett with 4.7% (47 votes) and other candidates with 0.3% (3 votes), among the 1,006 ballots cast by the borough's 1,658 registered voters, yielding a 60.7% turnout.

United States Senate election results for Sea Girt1
Year	Republican		Democratic		Third party(ies)	
Year	No.	%	No.	%	No.	%
2024	960	68.18%	439	31.18%	9	0.64%
2018	783	75.07%	236	22.63%	24	2.30%
2012	804	73.36%	284	25.91%	8	0.73%
2006	685	74.13%	228	24.68%	11	1.19%

United States Senate election results for Sea Girt2
Year	Republican		Democratic		Third party(ies)	
Year	No.	%	No.	%	No.	%
2020	987	66.15%	482	32.31%	23	1.54%
2014	591	73.14%	194	24.01%	23	2.85%
2013	473	75.80%	146	23.40%	5	0.80%
2008	879	72.52%	313	25.83%	20	1.65%

== Education ==
The Sea Girt School District serves public school students in pre-kindergarten through eighth grade at Sea Girt Elementary School. As of the 2024–25 school year, the district, comprised of one school, had an enrollment of 148 students and 24.6 classroom teachers (on an FTE basis), for a student–teacher ratio of 6.0:1. During the 2016–2017 school year, Sea Girt had the 21st smallest enrollment of any school district in the state, with 145 students.

For ninth through twelfth grades, Sea Girt's public school students attend Manasquan High School, as part of a sending/receiving relationship with the Manasquan Public Schools. Manasquan High School also serves students from Avon-by-the-Sea, Belmar, Brielle, Lake Como, Spring Lake, Spring Lake Heights who attend Manasquan High School as part of sending/receiving relationships with their respective districts. As of the 2024–25 school year, the high school had an enrollment of 917 students and 79.2 classroom teachers (on an FTE basis), for a student–teacher ratio of 11.6:1. Many graduates of the elementary school choose to attend private schools and have enrolled in Christian Brothers Academy, Lawrenceville School, Peddie School, Ranney School, Monsignor Donovan High School, Red Bank Catholic High School and St. Rose High School.

== Transportation ==
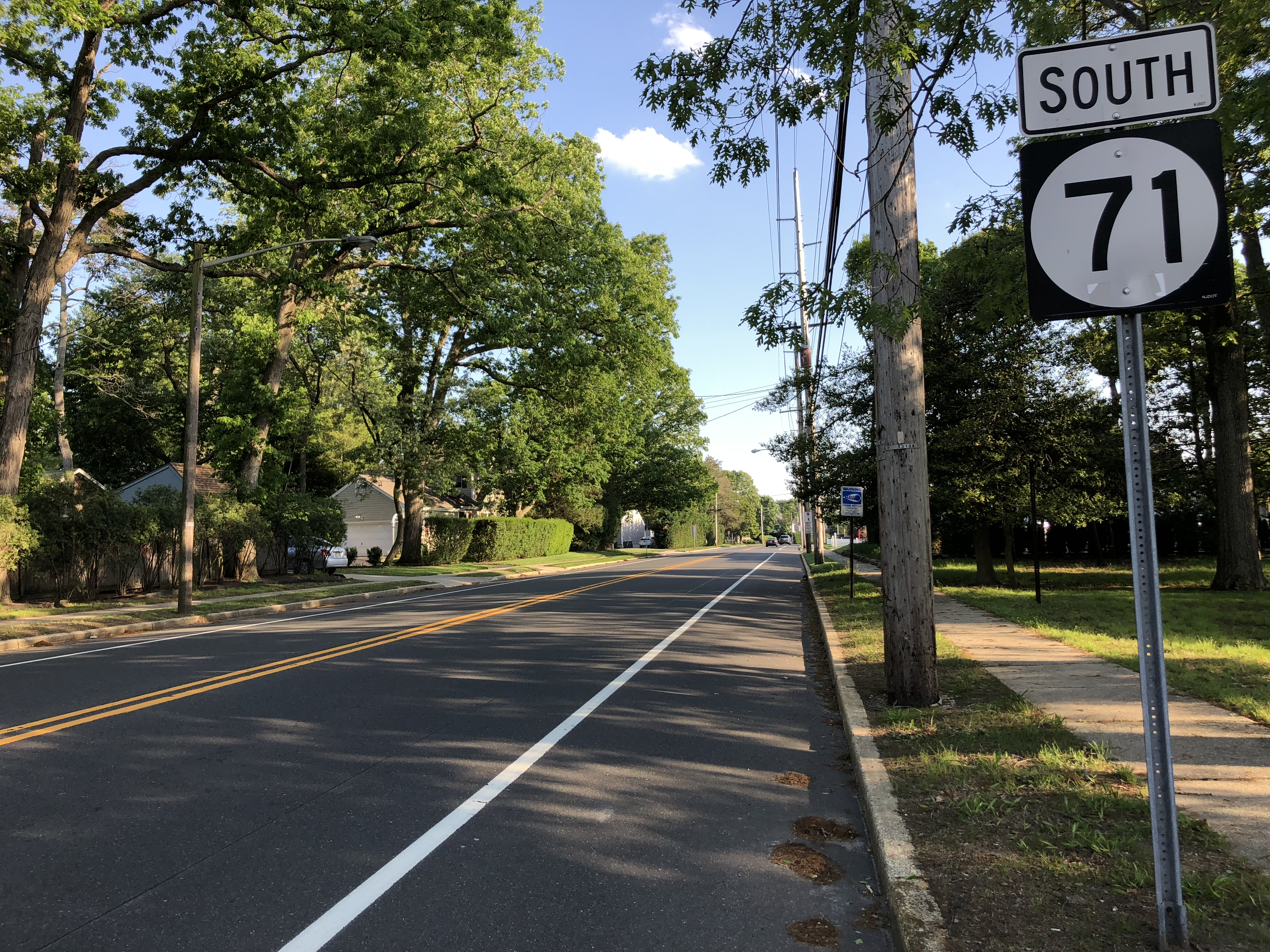
Route 71 in Sea Girt

=== Roads and highways ===
As of May 2010, the borough had a total of 17.14 miles (27.58 km) of roadways, of which 14.79 miles (23.80 km) were maintained by the municipality, 0.08 miles (0.13 km) by Monmouth County and 3.58 miles (5.76 km) by the New Jersey Department of Transportation.

Route 71 is the most prominent highway in Sea Girt. It follows Seventh Avenue south to north on the west side of the borough near and along the border with Wall Township, connecting Manasquan in the south to Spring Lake Heights in the north.

=== Public transportation ===
NJ Transit offers train service at the Manasquan station. Commuter service is provided on the North Jersey Coast Line, offering express and local service. Diesel service operates from Hoboken Terminal to Bay Head, New Jersey. Electric service operates from Penn Station to Long Branch, New Jersey, where the electrified portion of the line ends. Mid-line stations include Newark Penn Station, Newark Liberty International Airport Station, and Secaucus Junction.

NJ Transit bus service is available between Sea Girt and Philadelphia on the 317 route, with local service offered on the 830 route which runs between Asbury Park and Point Pleasant Beach with connections to additional local-service routes at Asbury Park.

== Points of interest ==
- Sea Girt Light began operation on December 10, 1896, and is located at Ocean Avenue and Beacon Boulevard. The lighthouse is one of only 20 lighthouses in the state of New Jersey that remain in existence.
- The National Guard Militia Museum of New Jersey maintains a museum in Sea Girt, which includes the Intelligent Whale, an experimental hand-cranked submarine based on an 1863 design.
- Both the New Jersey State Police and New Jersey Department of Corrections have their training facilities in Sea Girt. The New Jersey State Police Academy provides a program for recruits on a residential basis that provides training over a 24-week period. The facility was also a former New Jersey National Guard training base, and is still used as a training ground by the National Guard.

== Climate ==
According to the Köppen climate classification system, Sea Girt has a humid subtropical climate (Cfa). Cfa climates are characterized by all months having an average mean temperature above 32.0 °F (0.0 °C), at least four months with an average mean temperature at or above 50.0 °F (10.0 °C), at least one month with an average mean temperature at or above 71.6 °F (22.0 °C) and no significant precipitation difference between seasons. During the summer months at Sea Girt, a cooling afternoon sea breeze is present on most days, but episodes of extreme heat and humidity can occur with heat index values at or above 95.0 °F (35.0 °C). On average, the wettest month of the year is July which corresponds with the annual peak in thunderstorm activity. During the winter months, episodes of extreme cold and wind can occur with wind chill values below 0.0 °F (−17.8 °C). The plant hardiness zone at Sea Girt Beach is 7a with an average annual extreme minimum air temperature of 4.0 °F (−15.6 °C). The average seasonal (November–April) snowfall total is 18 to 24 inches (46 to 61 cm) and the average snowiest month is February which corresponds with the annual peak in nor'easter activity.

Climate data for Sea Girt Beach, NJ (1981–2010 Averages)
Month	Jan	Feb	Mar	Apr	May	Jun	Jul	Aug	Sep	Oct	Nov	Dec	Year
Mean daily maximum °F (°C)	39.9 (4.4)	42.5 (5.8)	49.2 (9.6)	58.8 (14.9)	68.5 (20.3)	77.7 (25.4)	83.2 (28.4)	81.9 (27.7)	75.7 (24.3)	65.2 (18.4)	55.1 (12.8)	45.0 (7.2)	62.0 (16.7)
Daily mean °F (°C)	32.4 (0.2)	34.6 (1.4)	40.9 (4.9)	50.4 (10.2)	60.1 (15.6)	69.5 (20.8)	75.1 (23.9)	74.0 (23.3)	67.3 (19.6)	56.4 (13.6)	47.1 (8.4)	37.5 (3.1)	53.9 (12.2)
Mean daily minimum °F (°C)	24.8 (−4.0)	26.7 (−2.9)	32.7 (0.4)	41.9 (5.5)	51.6 (10.9)	61.3 (16.3)	67.0 (19.4)	66.0 (18.9)	58.9 (14.9)	47.5 (8.6)	39.1 (3.9)	30.0 (−1.1)	45.7 (7.6)
Average precipitation inches (mm)	3.67 (93)	3.13 (80)	4.19 (106)	4.00 (102)	3.44 (87)	3.64 (92)	4.72 (120)	4.43 (113)	3.43 (87)	3.73 (95)	4.07 (103)	4.04 (103)	46.49 (1,181)
Average relative humidity (%)	64.6	62.0	60.3	61.6	65.3	69.8	69.2	71.0	71.1	69.4	67.8	65.5	66.5
Average dew point °F (°C)	21.8 (−5.7)	22.9 (−5.1)	28.2 (−2.1)	37.7 (3.2)	48.4 (9.1)	59.2 (15.1)	64.3 (17.9)	64.0 (17.8)	57.6 (14.2)	46.5 (8.1)	37.0 (2.8)	27.0 (−2.8)	43.0 (6.1)
Source: PRISM

Climate data for Sandy Hook, NJ Ocean Water Temperature (23 N Sea Girt)
Month	Jan	Feb	Mar	Apr	May	Jun	Jul	Aug	Sep	Oct	Nov	Dec	Year
Daily mean °F (°C)	37 (3)	36 (2)	40 (4)	46 (8)	55 (13)	62 (17)	69 (21)	72 (22)	68 (20)	59 (15)	51 (11)	43 (6)	53 (12)
Source: NOAA

== Ecology ==
According to the A. W. Kuchler U.S. potential natural vegetation types, Sea Girt would have an Appalachian Oak (104) vegetation type with an Eastern Hardwood Forest (25) vegetation form.

== Notable people ==
People who were born in, residents of, or otherwise closely associated with Sea Girt include:

- Lewis Benson (1906–1986), expert on the writings of George Fox
- G. Michael Brown (1942–2025), gaming regulator in New Jersey who became a lawyer for the gaming industry, and was the chief executive officer of Foxwoods Resort Casino
- William T. Doyle (1926–2024), member of the Vermont Senate from 1969 to 2017, making him the longest-serving state legislator in Vermont history
- Frederick Bernard Lacey (1920–2017), United States district judge of the United States District Court for the District of New Jersey
- Bruce Lefebvre (born 1969), executive chef at the Frog and the Peach in New Brunswick
- Elmer Matthews (1927–2015), lawyer and politician who served three terms in the New Jersey General Assembly
- Bill Parcells (born 1941), former NFL coach of the New York Giants, New England Patriots, New York Jets, and Dallas Cowboys
- Priscilla Ransohoff (1912–1992), education specialist at Fort Monmouth, daughter of Sea Girt mayor L. H. Burnett
- Richie Regan (1930–2002), basketball player and coach who played in the NBA for the Rochester / Cincinnati Royals
- Robert F. Stockton (1795–1866), United States Navy commodore, notable for his role in the capture of California during the Mexican–American War
- Alex Webster (1931–2012), American football fullback and halfback in the National Football League for the New York Giants. He was also the head coach of the Giants from 1969 to 1973
- Lawrence Aloysius Whipple (1910–1983), United States district judge of the United States District Court for the District of New Jersey

Preceded by Spring Lake	Beaches of New Jersey	Succeeded by Manasquan
