= Monmouth County, New Jersey =

County in New Jersey, United States

- County
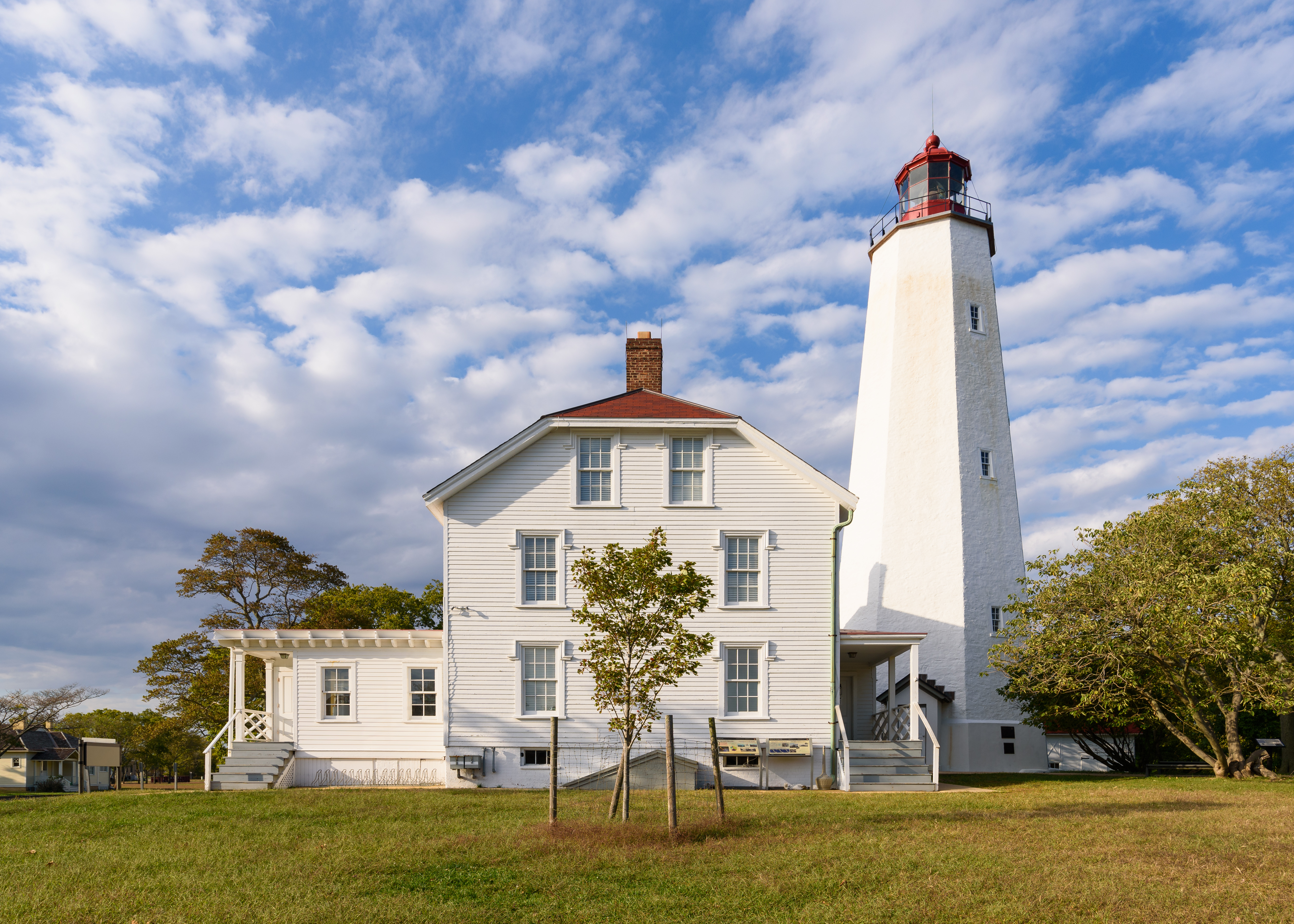
- Sandy Hook Light in Middletown Township

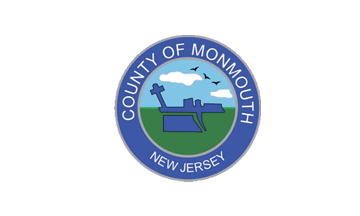
- Flag Seal
- Nickname: The Place You Want to Be
- Location within the U.S. state of New Jersey
- Interactive map of Monmouth County, New Jersey
- Coordinates: 40.29°N 74.15°W
- Country: United States
- State: New Jersey
- Founded: 1683
- Named for: Monmouthshire, Wales
- Seat: Freehold Borough
- Largest city: Middletown Township (population); Howell Township (area)

Government
  - Commissioner Director: Thomas A. Arnone (R)

Area
  - Total: 661.40 sq mi (1,713.0 km^{2})
  - Land: 468.18 sq mi (1,212.6 km^{2})
  - Water: 193.22 sq mi (500.4 km^{2}) 29.2%

Population (2020)
  - Total: 643,615
  - Estimate (2025): 651,035 ▲
  - Density: 1,374.7/sq mi (530.78/km^{2})
- Time zone: UTC−5 (Eastern)
  - Summer (DST): UTC−4 (EDT)
- Congressional districts: 3rd, 4th, 6th
- Website: co.monmouth.nj.us

Monmouth County (/ˈmɒnməθ/) is a county located in the central portion of the U.S. state of New Jersey. It is bordered to its west by Mercer and Middlesex Counties, to its south by Ocean County, to its east by the Atlantic Ocean, and to its north by the Raritan Bay (sharing a border with the boroughs of Staten Island, Brooklyn, and Queens in New York City, across it). Monmouth County's geographic area comprises 30% water. The county forms part of the New York metropolitan area. Monmouth County calls itself The Place You Want to Be. The county is part of the Jersey Shore region of the state.

As of the 2020 United States census, the county was the state's fifth-most-populous county with a population of 643,615, its highest decennial count ever and an increase of 13,235 (+2.1%) from the 2010 census count of 630,380, which in turn reflected an increase of 15,079 from 615,301 at the 2000 census. As of 2010, the county fell to the fifth-most populous county in the state, having been surpassed by Hudson County. The United States Census Bureau's Population Estimates Program estimated a 2025 population of 651,035, an increase of 7,420 (+1.2%) from the 2020 decennial census.

Monmouth's county seat is Freehold Borough, though many county offices are also located in neighboring Freehold Township. The most populous place was Middletown Township, with 67,106 residents at the time of the 2020 Census, while Howell Township covered 61.21 square miles (158.5 km^{2}), the largest total area of any municipality.

While there are differing historical theories, the most plausible of theories in the origin of the county's name are attributed to many settlers originating from Rhode Island where the Rhode Island Monmouth Society hailed from, or it being named after the historic county of Monmouthshire in Wales, Great Britain. The county, like much of the state, was significantly involved during the American Revolutionary War. The Battle of Monmouth was fought in June 1778 in what has been preserved as Monmouth Battlefield State Park, currently located in Freehold Township and Manalapan Township.

The county's economy is rich and diverse, due to its high population density and proximity to New York City. Located in the middle of the Northeast megalopolis, its inland county seat of Freehold Borough, the Tri-City region of coastal cities of Red Bank, Long Branch, and Asbury Park, along with the county constituting a vast swath of the New Jersey coastline, has contributed in its draw of tourists throughout the state (and much of the Northeastern United States at large), particularly during the summer months. Many communities within the county serve as commuter towns to and from New York City and other points north. Highways such as the Garden State Parkway, U.S. 9, Routes 34, 35, and 36, along with NJ Transit's North Jersey Coast Line and Seastreak, connects county residents to economic centers in North Jersey and New York City. In 2015, the county had a per capita personal income of $69,410, making it the fifth highest in New Jersey and ranked 74th of 3,113 counties in the United States. Many inland areas of the county are still quite agricultural, with many orchards, wineries, equestrian farms, and distilleries, such as Cream Ridge Winery, Delicious Orchards, Four JG's Orchards & Vineyards, and Laird & Company. The Bell Labs Complex is a major scientific research facility in Holmdel Township, where important breakthroughs, such as evidence for the Big Bang, were discovered. The county is also home to Monmouth University, a private university in West Long Branch.

== History ==
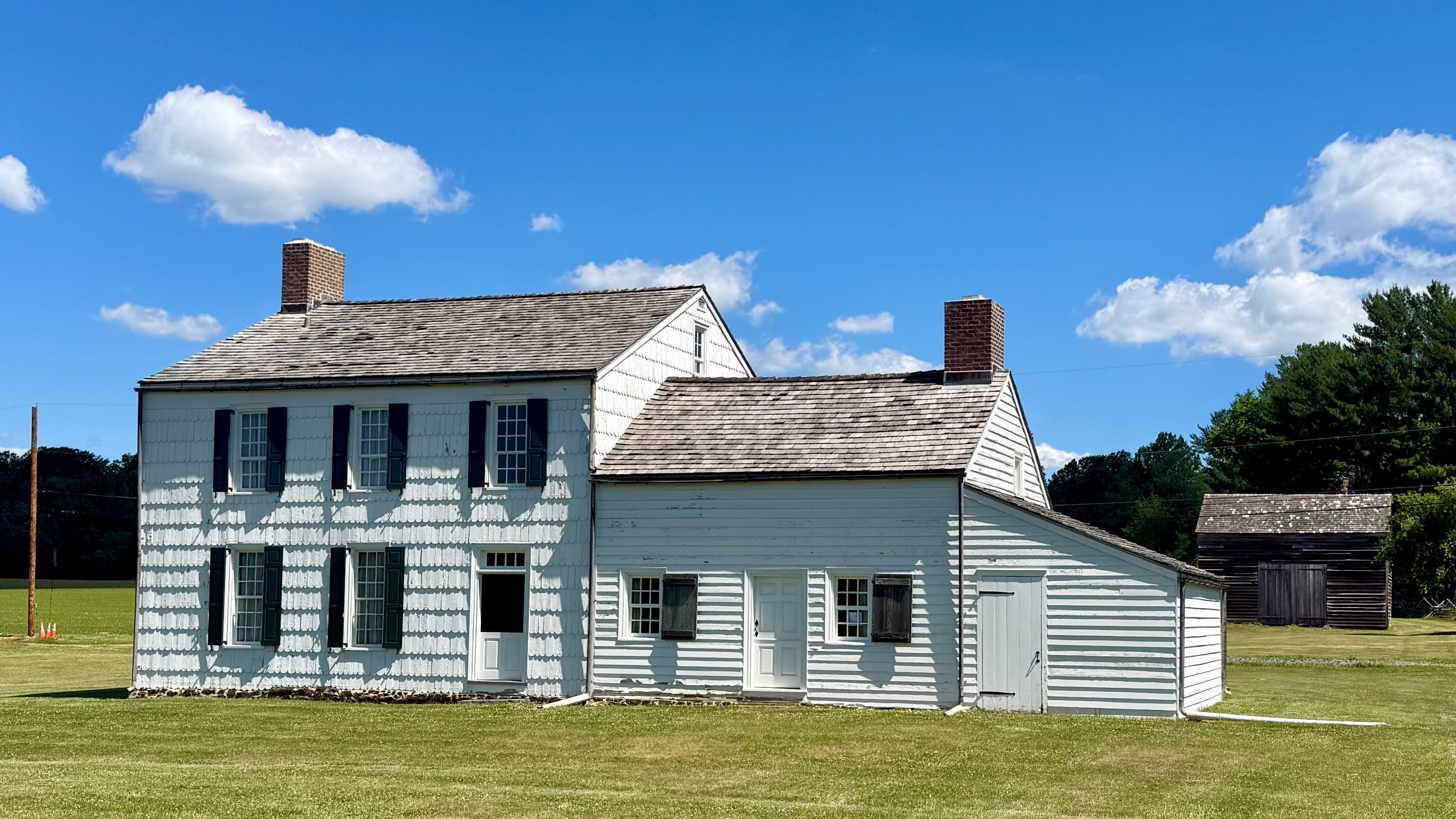
Craig House at Monmouth Battlefield State Park

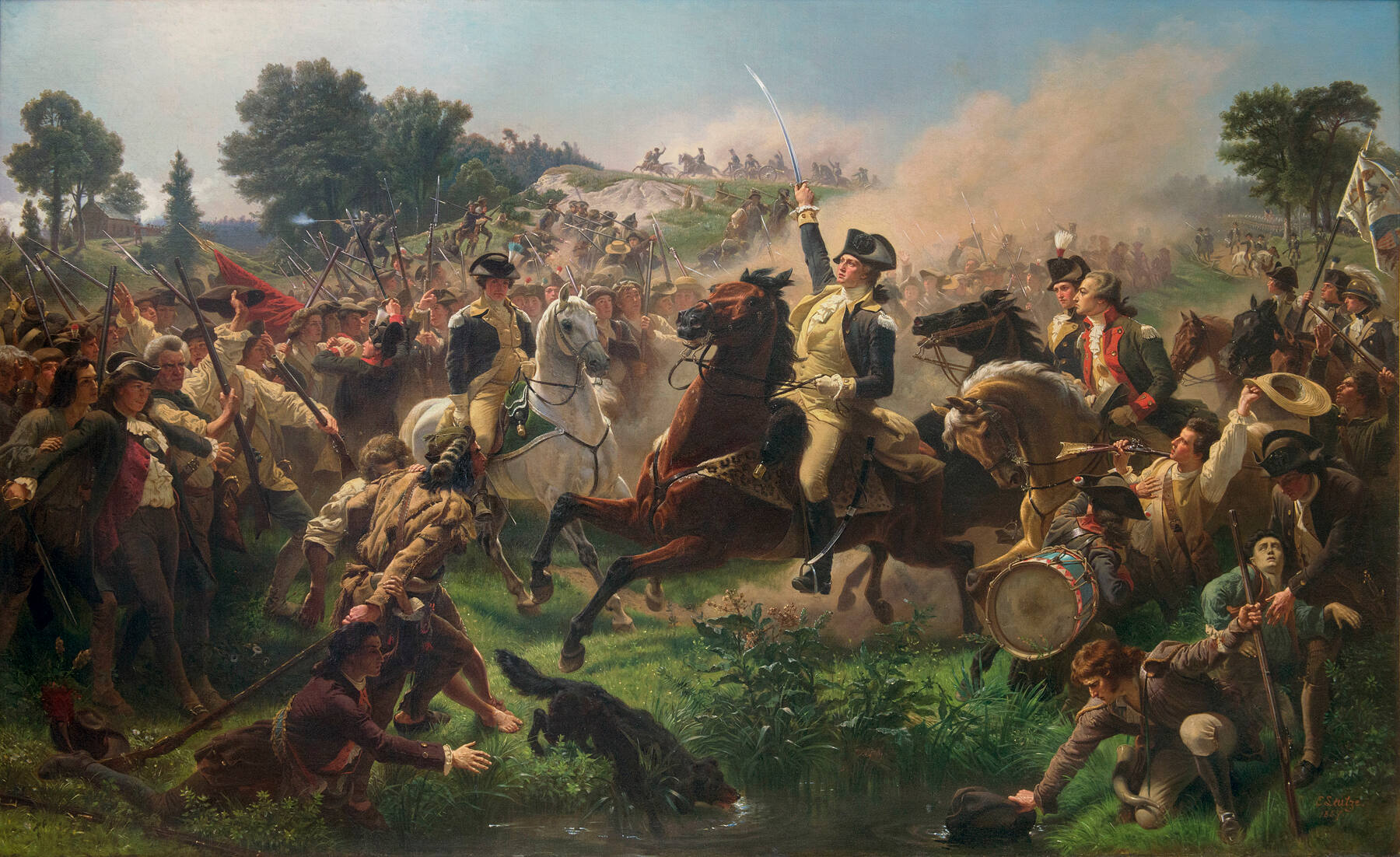
The Battle of Monmouth was fought on June 28, 1778

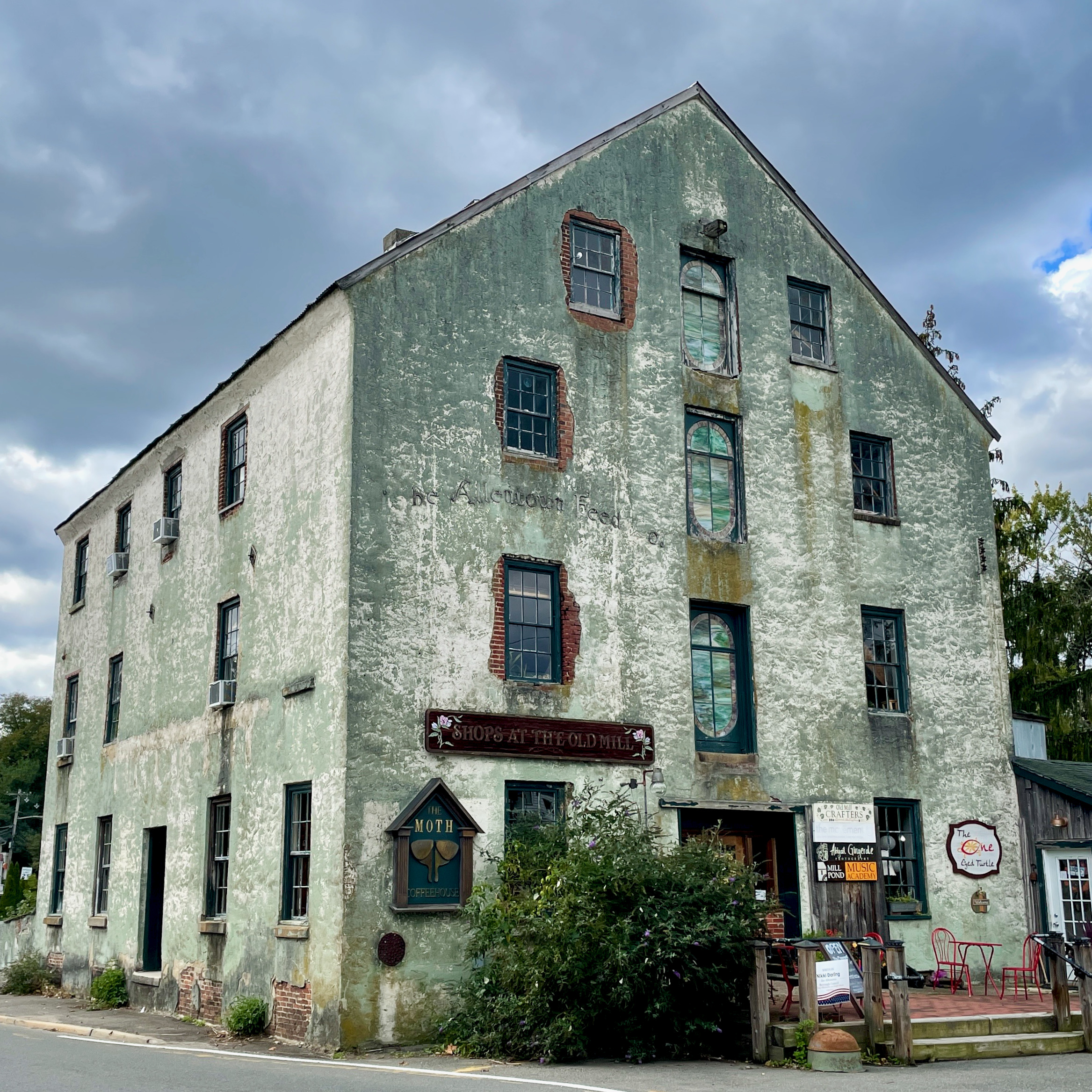
The Allentown Mill in Allentown

=== Etymology ===
The naming of Monmouth County has different historical theories. It is thought that the county received its name from the Rhode Island Monmouth Society. This is likely, due to many of the county's earliest settlers originating from Rhode Island. Another plausible theory is from a suggestion from Colonel Lewis Morris that the county should be named after Monmouthshire in Wales, Great Britain. Other suggestions include that it was named for James Scott, 1st Duke of Monmouth (1649–1685), who had many allies among the East Jersey leadership.

=== Indigenous history ===
Around the year 1000, the area of Monmouth County began to be inhabited by the Lenape Native Americans prior to the arrival of European settlers. They came from the Mississippi River area. They lived along the vicinity of the Jersey Shore, the Raritan Bay, the Raritan River and other areas in the northeastern United States. The Lenape were a hunter-gatherer society. They were largely sedentary, changing campsites seasonally. They were prolific hunters of small game and birds. They were also skilled fisherman, and were known to harvest vast amounts of clams from the bays and inlets on the Jersey Shore. They also practiced some agriculture to augment their food supply. During this time, an important crossroad of two major Lenape trails was located in the area of Freehold Township in western Monmouth County.

=== Colonial era ===
In 1609, the English navigator, Henry Hudson, and his crew aboard the Dutch vessel Half Moon spotted land in what is now Monmouth County, most likely off Sandy Hook; however, some historical accounts credit this landing to present-day Keansburg. Among the first European settlers and majority landowners in the area were Richard and Penelope Stout. Penelope "miraculously" survived her wounds from a native attack in Sandy Hook and lived to the age of 110. A group of Quaker families from Long Island settled the Monmouth Tract, an early land grant from Richard Nicolls issued in 1665. They were followed by a group of Scottish settlers who inhabited Freehold Township in about 1682-1685, followed several years later by Dutch settlers.. As they arrived in this area, they were greeted by Lenape people, who lived in scattered small family bands and developed a largely amicable relationship with the new arrivals. Enslaved Africans were present in the area from at least 1680, and by 1726 made up 9% of the total population of the county.

Monmouth County was established on March 7, 1683, while part of the province of East Jersey. On October 31, 1693, the county was partitioned into the townships of Freehold, Middletown and Shrewsbury.

Since June 1764, the 85-foot-high (26 m) Sandy Hook Light has guided ships safely into New York Harbor, making it the nation's oldest operating lighthouse. The light was designated as a National Historical Landmark in 1964, marking 200 years since it first went into use.

At the June 28, 1778, Battle of Monmouth, near Freehold Township, General George Washington's soldiers battled the British under Sir Henry Clinton, in the longest land battle of the American Revolutionary War. At Monmouth the tactics and training from Friedrich Wilhelm von Steuben developed at Valley Forge during the winter encampment were first implemented on a large scale. Other battles and massacres during the war in Monmouth County include sites such as the Burrowes Mansion in Matawan, and the Allen House in Shrewsbury.

At independence, Monmouth's population included 1,640 slaves, as well as an undetermined number of free African Americans. The number of enslaved persons fell steeply after 1820, though a small number remained until at least 1850. Monmouth's free African American population climbed from 353 in 1790 to 2,658 in 1860. There was a small African-American middle class consisting of freedmen present in Monmouth County by the 1840s and 1850s.

In 1790 Monmouth County's population was 16,918, of whom roughly 6,600 were of English descent and the remainder were Welsh, Dutch and Swedish, as well as small amounts of African Americans and Northern Irish Protestants. By 2010 Monmouth County's population was 628,112 of whom 40,489 were of English descent. Between 1890 and 1907 nearly 18 million European immigrants came to America. The region underwent massive and not unrelated economic changes, leading places like Monmouth County becoming significantly more diverse and somewhat less rural.

=== 19th century ===
In 1822, James P. Allaire bought land that would be used to establish the Howell Works Iron Foundry in what is now Wall Township. The village was an early example of a company town, having its workers live on site with numerous types of stores and facilities for them. The furnace had ceased to operate by 1848 as iron and coal production moved to Pennsylvania. Today, the land is a living history museum and U.S. historic district known as Allaire Village.

On May 18, 1826, the Navesink Twin Lights were commissioned by Congress, and were first used in 1828. The twin lighthouses were one of only seven in the country. However, this structure deteriorated rapidly, and was in need of replacement. On May 1, 1862, the current structure was first lit at a much grander scale. Upon completion, it was the most powerful lighthouse in the United States. In 1883, it became the first lighthouse in the country to use a mineral-oil lamp. Today, the lighthouse is open to the public as a U.S. historic landmark and place.

In 1848, one of the original Life Saving Stations was built in Sandy Hook for the United States Coast Guard. Between 1857 and 1867, construction began on the Fort at Sandy Hook. The fort remained nameless until 1895 when it was named Fort Hancock after Winfield Scott Hancock. On August 7, 1874, the Sandy Hook Proving Ground was established as a weapons testing area, considered a separate facility from the fort. In 1890, construction began on the artillery batteries of the fort. The Battery Porter was an early prototype of the gun lift carriage.

During the 19th century, Keyport's Marine Park was a major shipbuilding hub, having built 55 steamships between 1807 and 1868, which was more than Hoboken, Jersey City, or Camden during this period.

In 1850, Ocean County was carved out of Monmouth County.

On July 30, 1870, Monmouth Park Racetrack opened, a thoroughbred racing track in Eatontown. The facility closed and reopened several times, with the current facility having been in use since 1946.

On September 19, 1881, U.S. President James A. Garfield died in the Elberon section of Long Branch, a few months after being shot in a failed assassination attempt. Garfield was one of several presidents who would vacation in Long Branch around the Gilded Age, with other presidents who frequented the town including Chester A. Arthur, Ulysses S. Grant, Benjamin Harrison, Rutherford B. Hayes, William McKinley, and Woodrow Wilson.

On July 5, 1886, the Seabright Lawn Tennis and Cricket Club in Rumson opened as the first lawn tennis club in the United States.

In 1888, Palace Amusements opened in Asbury Park alongside the boardwalk, and contained numerous amusement rides and games, such as a carousel. After years of a declining economy within the city, the palace closed in 1988, 100 years after it opened. In 2004, the building was deemed unsafe, and was ordered to be demolished, although various elements were saved such as the iconic Tillie mural and the carousel.

In 1899, Guglielmo Marconi's first demonstration of the wireless telegraph in the United States took place at the Navesink Twin Lights.

In 1890, Sheriff Fields presented the county with a flag. It bore the coat of arms of the county and was raised over the local court house.

=== 20th century ===
In 1910, the Wright Brothers hosted an aviation show in Interlaken, where numerous records were broken, such as high altitudes, longest time airborne, the first night flight, and the first air mail delivery.

Fort Hancock in Sandy Hook played a minor role in World War 1 and World War 2. The fort was intended as one of the defensive forts of New York City, and as neither war came to the area, the fort was largely unaffected. However, during World War 1, several of the artillery guns were removed for use elsewhere. In 1919, the Sandy Hook Proving Ground was essentially abandoned in favor of a large site at the Aberdeen Proving Ground in Maryland. During World War 2, the fort served as a mobilization center. In 1946, the guns at the fort were considered obsolete, leading to their scrapping and subsequent decommissioning of the fort. The fort was reactivated twice, first as an antiaircraft defense and later as a Nike missile base, but was closed for good in 1974. Today, the fort is a National Historic Place and Landmark.

In 1916, two of the three Jersey Shore shark attacks occurred in Monmouth County, with one occurring on July 6 in Spring Lake while the other occurred on July 12 in Matawan. One person was killed in the Spring Lake attack, while in Matawan two people were killed and one was injured.

In 1917, construction of Fort Monmouth began under the name of Camp Little Silver as training grounds. The first permanent structure, a barracks, was erected in 1928. In 1928, the first radio-equipped meteorological balloon reached the atmosphere, a precursor to modern day weather sounding. Numerous buildings were constructed during the 1930s-1940s at the facility, with the fort significantly expanding in size. Fort Monmouth was also where Soviet spies Julius Rosenberg, Joel Barr, and Alfred Sarant operated. Numerous scientific breakthroughs occurred at Fort Monmouth, including Project Diana in 1946; SCORE, the world's first communications satellite in 1958; TIROS-1, the world's first full-scale weather satellite in 1960, and other projects including photography.

On November 11, 1926, the Count Basie Theater opened as the Carlton Theater in Red Bank. In 1970, the theater had closed alongside most of the other historic theaters in the town. In 1973, an anonymous donation allowed for the preservation of the theater. In 1984, it was renamed after Count Basie, a native of Red Bank. Many well-known acts had performed at the theater, such as Tony Bennett, Olivia Newton-John, Bruce Springsteen, and Jon Bon Jovi.

In 1928, the Asbury Park Convention Hall was constructed alongside the boardwalk. On January 1, 1930, the Paramount Theater in Asbury Park showed its first film, Wings. The buildings are connected by a grand arcade alongside the boardwalk.

On September 8, 1934, the SS Morro Castle caught fire and burned during a storm on its route from New York City to Havana, Cuba. The ship drifted ashore to Asbury Park by the Convention Hall, where it remained until 1935 when it was towed away to be scrapped. The disaster was one of the deadliest maritime disasters in United States history, having killed 137 people.

On December 13, 1943, Naval Weapons Station Earle was commissioned, which is designed to safely store and transport military ordinance. The 11,000 acre main facility consumes land in Colts Neck Township, Howell Township, Wall Township, and Tinton Falls, while the three-pronged pier in the Leonardo section of Middletown Township is connected to the main facility via Normandy Road, a military-only railroad and road that connects the facilities.

The Bell Labs complex in Holmdel Township was a major center for scientific research throughout the 20th century. On May 4, 1933, radio astronomy, one of the most significant achievements in the field of astronomy, was invented by Karl Guthe Jansky. On June 25, 1946, the silicon solar cell was patented by Russell S. Ohl, who operated out of Bell Labs. In 1959, AT&T began construction on the current building, completing it in 1962, where the building acted as a research and development facility. The facility was expanded twice in 1966 and 1982. On October 17, 1978, cosmic microwave background radiation was discovered at the site by Arno Penzias and Robert Wilson.

On June 12, 1968, the Garden State Arts Center opened in Holmdel Township alongside the Garden State Parkway, having its own exit of 116. The amphitheater often hosted classical and popular music, as well as various other programs, and has a capacity of roughly 10,000 people. In 1995, on the opposite side of the parkway, the New Jersey Vietnam Veterans' Memorial was opened. In 1996, the facility expanded heavily, adding thousands in capacity, and shifting toward general music with broader appeal to compete with other amphitheaters. In 1996, the facility was renamed to PNC Bank Arts Center. The theater is one of the most successful amphitheaters in the country.

In 1970, Asbury Park experienced a major race riot between July 4 and July 10, one of the largest in New Jersey. The riot was largely due to high unemployment, poor housing conditions, and lack of recreational activities within the African American community. Over 180 people were injured during the week long riot. The largely African American West Side of the city experienced the most damage, with an estimated $5,600,000 in damages.

On February 8, 1974, The Stone Pony opened in Asbury Park across the street from the boardwalk. The live music venue is small but well-known, with its most notable talents Bruce Springsteen and the E Street Band as well as Southside Johnny and the Asbury Jukes having launched their career out of the venue.

=== 21st century ===
In 2005, Fort Monmouth was recommended for closure, and in 2011 the facility shut down for good. Redevelopment of the land had been in talks since 2006, and in 2021 Netflix had announced it was going to create a film studio at the facility. In 2022, a proposal to develop housing units where the fort's housing stands was approved.

In 2006, Bell Labs was sold, and preservation efforts were made by residents and former employees. In 2013, a developer began site redevelopment, with the research building becoming a New Urbanism inspired mixed-use facility, while the surrounding land became residential housing.

In 2016, Monmouth Mall in Eatontown announced that it would be redeveloped into a pedestrian-friendly mixed-used development, including demolition of some of the abandoned parts of the mall, with the addition of housing, plazas and walkways, amongst many other changes. The mall, which opened in 1960, had faced lots of vacancies and financial troubles over the years that led to the decision. The plans were finalized in 2023.

On June 14, 2018, Monmouth Park Racetrack became the first place in New Jersey to offer sports betting.

== Geography and climate ==
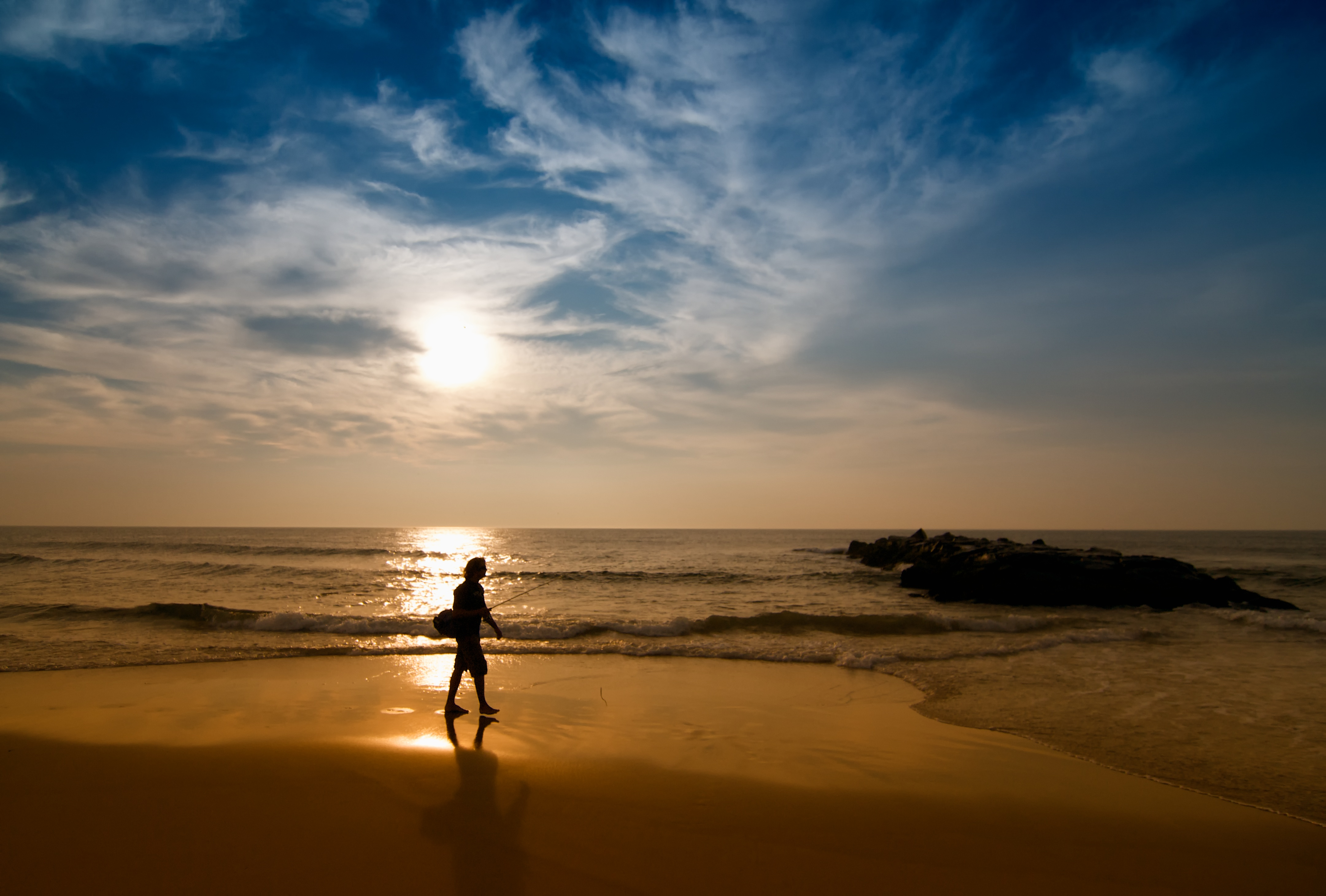
Sunrise on the Jersey Shore at Spring Lake, New Jersey, facing the Atlantic Ocean

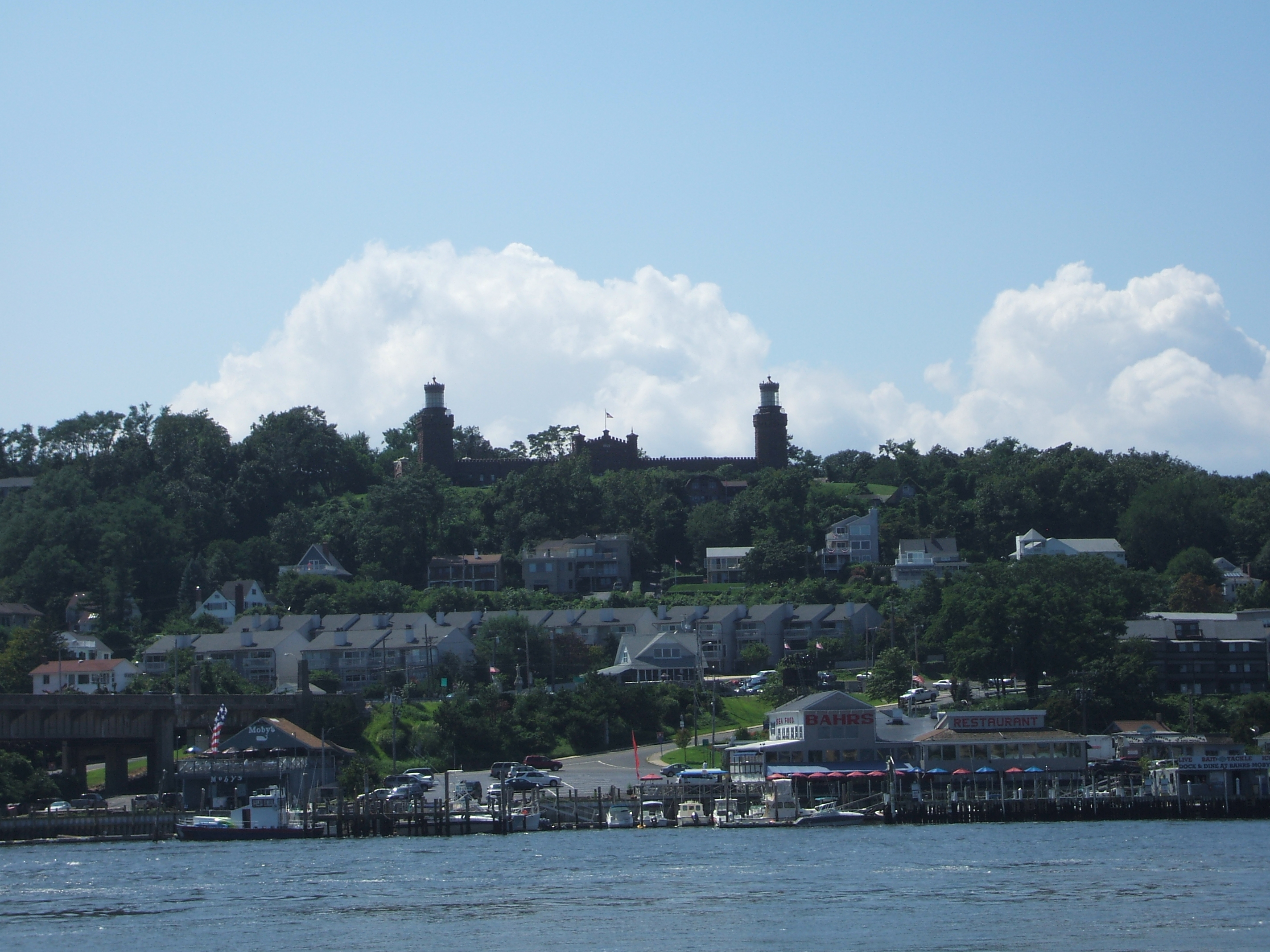
The historic Navesink Twin Lights is located on the Navesink Highlands in Highlands, one of the highest points in Monmouth County and constitute among the highest headlands along the United States east coast south of Maine

According to the U.S. Census Bureau, as of the 2020 Census, the county had a total area of 661.40 square miles (1,713.0 km^{2}), of which 468.18 square miles (1,212.6 km^{2}) was land (70.8%) and 193.22 square miles (500.4 km^{2}) was water (29.2%).

Much of Monmouth County remains flat and low-lying, even at its western inland extreme. However, there are some low hills in and around Holmdel Township, and one of them, Crawford Hill, the former site of a radar facility, is the county's highest point, variously listed at 380 to 391 feet (116 to 119 m) above sea level. The top portion of the hill is owned by Alcatel-Lucent and houses a research laboratory of Bell Laboratories. The northeastern portion of the county, in the Locust section of Middletown Township and the boroughs of Highlands and Atlantic Highlands, are also very hilly. The lowest point is sea level.

Along with adjacent Middlesex and Ocean counties, Monmouth County is a mecca for boating and fishing. Its waterways include several tributaries that flow from the more agrarian regions of western Monmouth County into the Raritan River, and various rivers and inlets that flow from the more densely populated region of the Raritan Bayshore of northern Monmouth County into the Raritan Bay and the Lower New York Bay, before finally draining out into the Atlantic Ocean. The Manasquan Inlet is located in the county, which connects the Atlantic Ocean with the estuary of the Manasquan River, a bay-like body of saltwater that serves as the starting point of the Intracoastal Waterway, which attracts as many as 1,600 boats each weekend during the peak season.

=== Climate and weather ===
Freehold Borough, New Jersey

Climate chart (precipitation, max. and min. temperature)
J	F	M	A	M	J	J	A	S	O	N	D
3.6 39 22	2.9 43 24	4.1 51 30	4.2 62 40	4.1 72 50	4.4 81 60	5 86 65	4.1 84 64	4.5 77 55	3.8 66 43	3.8 55 36	4 44 27
- █ Average max. and min. temperatures in °F
- █ Precipitation totals in inches
- Source: The Weather Channel
Metric conversion
J	F	M	A	M	J	J	A	S	O	N	D
91 4 −6	74 6 −4	104 11 −1	107 17 4	104 22 10	112 27 16	127 30 18	104 29 18	114 25 13	97 19 6	97 13 2	102 7 −3
- █ Average max. and min. temperatures in °C
- █ Precipitation totals in mm

Much of Monmouth County has a humid subtropical climate (Cfa), while some inland areas have a hot-summer humid continental climate (Dfa). In recent years, average temperatures in the county seat of Freehold Borough have ranged from a low of 22 °F (−6 °C) in January to a high of 86 °F (30 °C) in July, although a record low of −13 °F (−25 °C) was recorded in January 1984 and a record high of 106 °F (41 °C) was recorded in July 2011. Average monthly precipitation ranged from 2.98 inches (76 mm) in February to 5.08 inches (129 mm) in July.

Average monthly temperatures in Asbury Park range from 32.5 °F in January to 75.0 °F in July, while in Allentown, they range from 32.1 °F in January to 75.5 °F in July.

On October 29, 2012, Hurricane Sandy caused catastrophic damage to coastal areas of Monmouth County. As Sandy's surge arrived in Monmouth County, flood levels of 13.31 feet (4.06 m) above normal were measured at Sandy Hook shortly before the destruction of the tidal station, breaking all previous local records. The surge caused waves as high as 32.5 feet (9.9 m), measured where the Sandy Hook Bay meets the New York Bay.

=== Adjacent counties ===
- Middlesex County - northwest
- Ocean County - south
- Mercer County - west
- Burlington County - southwest
- Richmond County, New York - north
- Long Island (Kings County and Queens County, New York) - northeast

=== National protected areas ===
- Gateway National Recreation Area (part)

== Demographics ==
Historical population
Census	Pop.	Note	%±
1790	16,918		—
1800	19,872		17.5%
1810	22,150		11.5%
1820	25,038		13.0%
1830	29,233		16.8%
1840	32,909		12.6%
1850	30,313	*	−7.9%
1860	39,346		29.8%
1870	46,195		17.4%
1880	55,538		20.2%
1890	69,128		24.5%
1900	82,057		18.7%
1910	94,734		15.4%
1920	104,925		10.8%
1930	147,209		40.3%
1940	161,238		9.5%
1950	225,327		39.7%
1960	334,401		48.4%
1970	461,849		38.1%
1980	503,173		8.9%
1990	553,124		9.9%
2000	615,301		11.2%
2010	630,380		2.5%
2020	643,615		2.1%
2025 (est.)	651,035		1.2%
Historical sources: 1790-1990; 1970-2010 2000 2010 2020 * = Lost territory in previous decade.

=== 2020 census ===
As of the 2020 census, the county had 643,615 people, 244,630 households, and 161,545 families. The population density was 1,372.9 inhabitants per square mile (530.1/km^{2}). There were 268,912 housing units at an average density of 573.6 per square mile (221.5/km^{2}).

The median age was 43.5 years, with 20.5% of residents under the age of 18 and 18.5% age 65 or older. For every 100 females there were 94.4 males, and for every 100 females age 18 and over there were 92.0 males.

According to the 2020 Decennial Census Demographic and Housing Characteristics (DHC), 94.9% of residents lived in urban areas while 5.1% lived in rural areas.

There were 244,630 households in the county, of which 29.7% had children under the age of 18 living in them. Of all households, 53.4% were married-couple households, 15.4% were households with a male householder and no spouse or partner present, and 25.8% were households with a female householder and no spouse or partner present. About 25.8% of all households were made up of individuals and 12.3% had someone living alone who was 65 years of age or older.

There were 268,912 housing units, of which 9.0% were vacant. Among occupied housing units, 72.8% were owner-occupied and 27.2% were renter-occupied. The homeowner vacancy rate was 1.2% and the rental vacancy rate was 6.3%.

The county's median household income was $102,870, and the median family income was $124,778. About 6.0% of the population were below the poverty line, including 9.1% of those under age 18 and 6.4% of those age 65 or over.

=== Racial and ethnic composition ===
Monmouth County, New Jersey – Racial and ethnic composition Note: the US Census treats Hispanic/Latino as an ethnic category. This table excludes Latinos from the racial categories and assigns them to a separate category. Hispanics/Latinos may be of any race.
Race / Ethnicity (NH = Non-Hispanic)	Pop 1980	Pop 1990	Pop 2000	Pop 2010	Pop 2020	% 1980	% 1990	% 2000	% 2010	% 2020
White alone (NH)	440,765	469,109	495,902	483,435	460,825	87.60%	84.81%	80.60%	76.69%	71.60%
Black or African American alone (NH)	42,285	45,683	47,745	43,931	39,178	8.40%	8.26%	7.76%	6.97%	6.09%
Native American or Alaska Native alone (NH)	519	649	579	616	482	0.10%	0.12%	0.09%	0.10%	0.07%
Asian alone (NH)	5,334	14,864	24,257	31,018	36,008	1.06%	2.69%	3.94%	4.92%	5.59%
Native Hawaiian or Pacific Islander alone (NH)	x	x	123	172	97	x	x	0.02%	0.03%	0.02%
Other race alone (NH)	1,355	412	1,026	1,730	4,566	0.27%	0.07%	0.17%	0.27%	0.71%
Mixed race or Multiracial (NH)	x	x	7,494	8,539	21,729	x	x	1.22%	1.35%	3.38%
Hispanic or Latino (any race)	12,915	22,407	38,175	60,939	80,730	2.57%	4.05%	6.20%	9.67%	12.54%
Total	503,173	553,124	615,301	630,380	643,615	100.00%	100.00%	100.00%	100.00%	100.00%

The county's racial makeup was 71.60% White alone (NH), 6.09% Black or African American alone (NH), 0.07% Native American or Alaska Native alone (NH), 5.59% Asian alone (NH), 0.02% Native Hawaiian or Pacific Islander alone (NH), 0.71% from other races, and 3.38% from two or more races. Hispanic or Latino residents of any race comprised 12.54% of the population.

=== 2010 census ===
The 2010 United States census counted 630,380 people, 233,983 households, and 163,320 families in the county. The population density was 1,344.7 per square mile (519.2/km^{2}). There were 258,410 housing units at an average density of 551.2 per square mile (212.8/km^{2}). The racial makeup was 82.60% (520,716) White, 7.37% (46,443) Black or African American, 0.19% (1,211) Native American, 4.96% (31,258) Asian, 0.03% (211) Pacific Islander, 2.89% (18,187) from other races, and 1.96% (12,354) from two or more races. Hispanic or Latino of any race were 9.67% (60,939) of the population.

Of the 233,983 households, 32.4% had children under the age of 18; 55.5% were married couples living together; 10.5% had a female householder with no husband present and 30.2% were non-families. Of all households, 25% were made up of individuals and 10.7% had someone living alone who was 65 years of age or older. The average household size was 2.66 and the average family size was 3.22.

23.8% of the population were under the age of 18, 7.8% from 18 to 24, 24% from 25 to 44, 30.6% from 45 to 64, and 13.8% who were 65 years of age or older. The median age was 41.3 years. For every 100 females, the population had 94.7 males. For every 100 females ages 18 and older there were 91.9 males.

== Government ==
=== County government ===
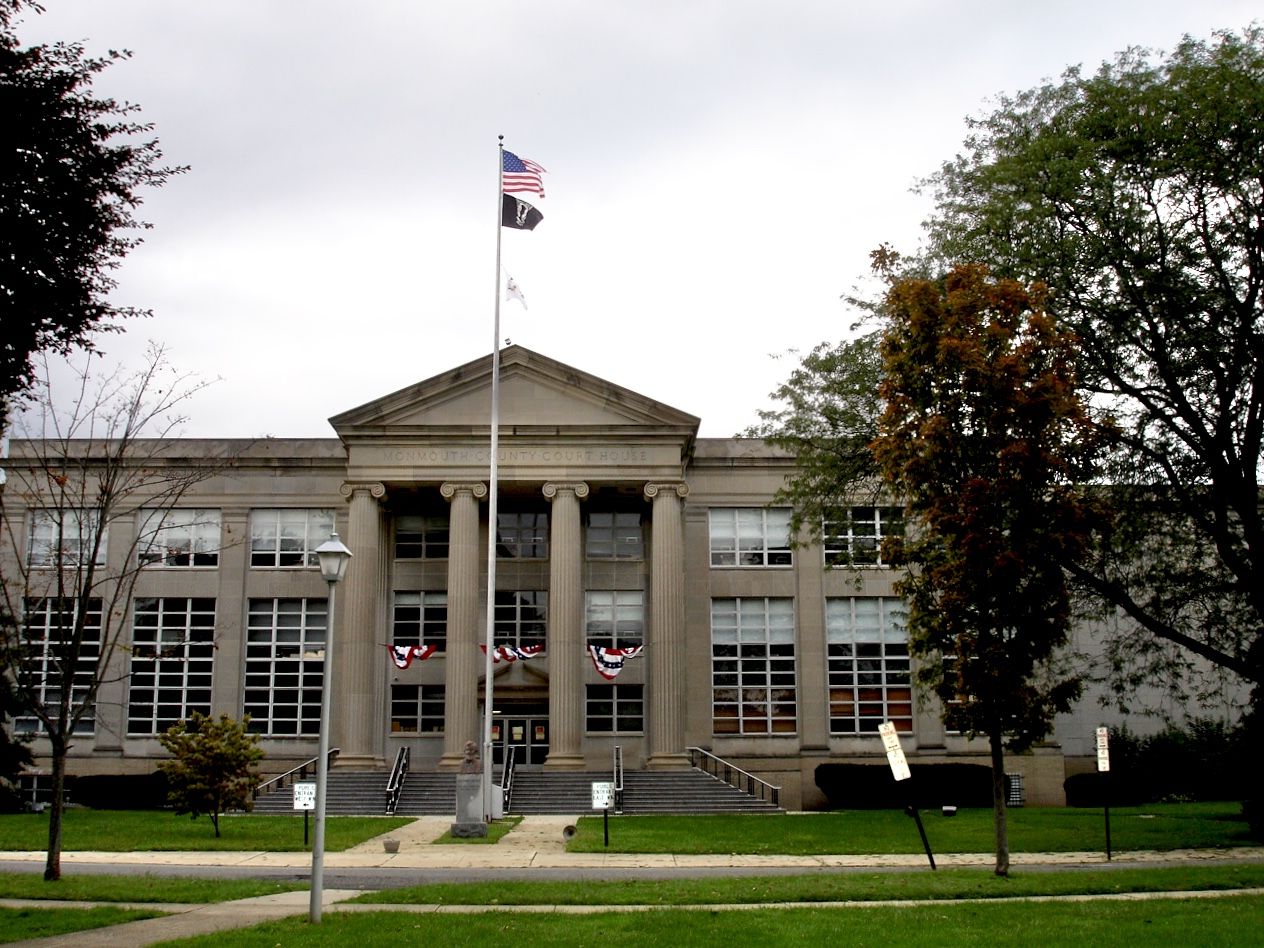
Monmouth County Courthouse in Freehold Borough, the county seat

Monmouth County is governed by a five-member Board of County Commissioners, who are elected at-large for three-year terms of office on a staggered basis, with either one or two seats up for election each year. Each January, the commissioners select one of their members to serve as the director of the board for the year to preside over the meetings and activities of the board. Monmouth County's Commissioners have both administrative and policy-making powers. The commissioners oversee the five mandatory functions of the county government delegated to it by the state. Each commissioner is assigned responsibility for one of the five functional areas: Administration and Special Services; Public Works and Engineering; Human Services, Health and Transportation; Finance and Administration of Justice, overseeing more than 70 county departments in total. In 2016, freeholders were paid $27,000 and the freeholder director was paid an annual salary of $27,900. County Administrator Teri O'Connor, an appointed position, serves as the county's chief executive officer, and is responsible for carrying out the policies and directives established by the Board of County Commissioners and managing the daily operations of the county's more than 3,000 employees.

As of 2026, Monmouth County's Commissioners are (with terms for Chair and Vice-Chair ending every December 31):

Commissioner	Party, Residence, Term
Director Thomas A. Arnone	R, Neptune City, 2028
Deputy Director Ross F. Licitra	R, Marlboro Township, 2026
Erik Anderson	R, Shrewsbury, 2026
Nick DiRocco	R, Wall Township, 2028
Susan M. Kiley	R, Hazlet Township, 2027

The Republican Party had held all five Commissioner seats until 2006, but after the 2006 and 2008 elections, Democrats controlled the Board by a 3–2 margin. The Board swung back in favor of the Republicans after the 2009 election when Republican John Curley beat Democrat Sean Byrnes. Both were running to succeed former Commissioner Director Barbara McMorrow, a Democrat, who had chosen not to seek re-election. In 2010, former mayor of Neptune City, Thomas Arnone (R), and incumbent Commissioner Robert Clifton (R) won seats giving Republicans control of the Board of County Commissioners by a 4–1 margin. The board has been all Republican since 2011.

Pursuant to Article VII Section II of the New Jersey State Constitution, each county in New Jersey is required to have three elected administrative officials known as "constitutional officers." These officers are the County Clerk and County Surrogate (both elected for five-year terms of office) and the County Sheriff (elected for a three-year term). Monmouth county's constitutional officers are:

Office	Party, Residence, Term
Clerk Christine Giordano Hanlon	R, Ocean Township, 2025
Sheriff Shaun Golden	R, Howell Township, 2025
Surrogate Maureen T. Raisch	R, Middletown Township, 2026

Raymond Santiago of Freehold Township is the Monmouth County Prosecutor, having been formally nominated to the position by Governor of New Jersey Phil Murphy in September 2022. Monmouth County constitutes Vicinage 9 of the New Jersey Superior Court and is seated at the Monmouth County Courthouse in Freehold Borough, with additional facilities in Freehold and Ocean Township; the Assignment Judge for Vicinage 9 is Lisa P. Thornton.

=== Federal representatives ===
The 3rd, 4th, and 6th Congressional Districts cover the county. For the 119th United States Congress, New Jersey's 3rd congressional district is currently represented Herb Conaway (D, Delran Township). For the 119th United States Congress, New Jersey's 4th congressional district is represented by Chris Smith (R, Manchester Township). For the 119th United States Congress, New Jersey's 6th congressional district is represented by Frank Pallone (D, Long Branch).

=== State representatives ===
The 53 municipalities of Monmouth County are covered by five legislative districts.

District	Senator	Assembly	Municipalities
10th	James Holzapfel (R)	Paul Kanitra (R) Greg McGuckin (R)	Brielle, Manasquan, Sea Girt, Spring Lake, and Spring Lake Heights. The remainder of this district covers portions of Ocean County.
11th	Vin Gopal (D)	Margie Donlon (D) Luanne Peterpaul (D)	Allenhurst, Asbury Park, Bradley Beach, Colts Neck Township, Deal, Eatontown, Freehold Borough, Freehold Township, Interlaken, Loch Arbour, Long Branch, Neptune City, Neptune Township, Ocean Township, Red Bank, Shrewsbury, Shrewsbury Township, and Tinton Falls.
12th	Owen Henry (R)	Alex Sauickie (R) Robert D. Clifton (R)	Allentown, Englishtown, Manalapan Township, Matawan, Millstone Township, Roosevelt and Upper Freehold Township. The remainder of this district covers portions of Burlington County, Middlesex County, and Ocean County.
13th	Declan O'Scanlon (R)	Vicky Flynn (R) Gerard Scharfenberger (R)	Aberdeen Township, Atlantic Highlands, Hazlet Township, Highlands, Holmdel Township, Keansburg, Keyport, Little Silver, Marlboro Township, Middletown Township, Monmouth Beach, Oceanport, Rumson, Sea Bright, Union Beach, and West Long Branch.
30th	Robert W. Singer (R)	Sean T. Kean (R) Avi Schnall (D)	Avon-by-the-Sea, Belmar, Farmingdale, Howell Township, Lake Como, and Wall Township. The remainder of this district covers portions of Ocean County.

=== Fire departments ===
Monmouth County is covered by 53 different fire departments, which contain 135 individual fire companies and over 7,000 volunteer firefighters, who are all represented by the Monmouth County Firemen's Association.

The Monmouth County Fire Marshal's Office is responsible for training all of the firefighters through the Monmouth County Fire Academy, as well as investigating any fires which may be deemed suspicious and/or involving a fatality. The Monmouth County fire marshal and staff – including assistant fire marshals and academy staff – are appointed by the County Board of Commissioners.

Except for the fully professional Asbury Park Fire Department and the US Navy Fire Department at NWS Earle, the remainder of the municipalities in the county have volunteer or combination fire departments. The largest volunteer department is in Middletown Township with 11 stations and 350 active members, special services, air and fire police units, in addition to operating its own training facility.

In terms of hazardous material (HazMat) emergencies, very few towns have special units to respond to these types of emergencies. Fort Monmouth responded to most HazMat cases prior to the closing of the base. Naval Weapons Station Earle is also available for HazMat incidents. Hazardous materials incidents are currently managed by Monmouth County Hazmat as the lead agency with a joint cooperative team composed of Neptune Township OEM, Southard (Howell) Fire Company and Middletown Fire Department Special Services.

The oldest fire department in the county in continuous operation is the Hope Fire Company in Allentown, organized in 1856. The newest fire department, Holmdel Fire Co. No. 2 was established in 2006. Monmouth County utilizes a mutual aid system, in which surrounding municipalities are available to send their resources to incidents where extra help or expertise is needed.

== Politics ==
Results by county: Trump: 40–50%; 50–60%; 60–70%; 70–80%; 80–90%; Harris: 40–50%; 50–60%; 60–70%; 70–80%

United States presidential election results for Monmouth County, New Jersey
Year	Republican		Democratic		Third party(ies)	
Year	No.	%	No.	%	No.	%
1896	10,611	55.27%	7,799	40.63%	787	4.10%
1900	10,363	53.10%	8,570	43.91%	583	2.99%
1904	10,885	52.89%	9,032	43.89%	662	3.22%
1908	12,528	56.26%	9,274	41.64%	468	2.10%
1912	3,683	18.25%	9,799	48.55%	6,700	33.20%
1916	11,624	51.46%	10,729	47.49%	237	1.05%
1920	28,818	68.07%	12,975	30.65%	543	1.28%
1924	34,451	65.64%	14,931	28.45%	3,100	5.91%
1928	47,046	65.84%	24,286	33.99%	122	0.17%
1932	40,467	52.73%	35,219	45.89%	1,055	1.37%
1936	41,460	51.33%	38,914	48.18%	393	0.49%
1940	49,675	57.73%	36,298	42.18%	74	0.09%
1944	49,349	58.66%	34,720	41.27%	53	0.06%
1948	52,908	62.22%	30,507	35.88%	1,618	1.90%
1952	73,228	66.28%	37,006	33.49%	257	0.23%
1956	83,828	71.80%	32,329	27.69%	594	0.51%
1960	81,382	56.49%	62,434	43.34%	244	0.17%
1964	61,367	39.07%	95,320	60.69%	368	0.23%
1968	87,311	51.22%	69,669	40.87%	13,476	7.91%
1972	124,830	65.71%	63,176	33.25%	1,971	1.04%
1976	110,104	54.29%	88,956	43.87%	3,730	1.84%
1980	120,173	56.69%	71,328	33.65%	20,470	9.66%
1984	152,595	65.52%	79,382	34.08%	932	0.40%
1988	147,320	61.14%	91,844	38.12%	1,793	0.74%
1992	117,715	44.23%	101,750	38.24%	46,651	17.53%
1996	99,975	40.16%	120,414	48.37%	28,572	11.48%
2000	119,291	45.51%	131,476	50.15%	11,374	4.34%
2004	163,650	54.56%	133,773	44.60%	2,516	0.84%
2008	160,433	51.19%	148,737	47.46%	4,244	1.35%
2012	148,000	51.81%	133,820	46.84%	3,847	1.35%
2016	166,723	52.47%	137,181	43.17%	13,846	4.36%
2020	191,808	50.72%	181,291	47.94%	5,052	1.34%
2024	197,409	54.81%	156,382	43.42%	6,352	1.76%

Monmouth County has generally leaned Republican by small margins in federal, state, and local races, though registered Republicans only outnumber registered Democrats by 2.5%. All of its County Commissioners and constitutional officers are Republicans, and only one district in the county is entirely represented by Democrats in the state legislature. In 2020, Joe Biden came closer to winning the county than any Democrat since Al Gore in 2000 and Bill Clinton in 1996, the only two Democratic presidential candidates to have won it since 1964, when Lyndon B. Johnson won a national landslide and carried every county in New Jersey. However, in 2024, Donald Trump won the county with the best Republican percentage since 1988. As of September 1, 2023, there were a total of 492,307 registered voters in Monmouth County, of whom 140,562 (28.6%) were registered as Democrats, 153,139 (31.1%) were registered as Republicans, and 192,859 (39.2%) were registered as Unaffiliated. There were 5,747 (1.2%) voters registered to other parties. Among the county's 2010 Census population, 89% of residents of age 18 and over were registered to vote.

Senate Class 1 election results

United States Senate election results for Monmouth County, New Jersey1
Year	Republican		Democratic		Third party(ies)	
Year	No.	%	No.	%	No.	%
2024	185,197	53.80%	151,920	44.13%	7,112	2.07%
2018	140,628	53.79%	112,383	42.99%	8,408	3.22%
2012	144,366	53.67%	120,154	44.67%	4,444	1.65%
2006	96,247	52.65%	81,672	44.68%	4,882	2.67%
2000	123,447	50.94%	109,282	45.09%	9,624	3.97%
1994	83,534	51.23%	75,636	46.39%	3,888	2.38%
1988	111,318	48.34%	117,063	50.83%	1,906	0.83%
1982	83,457	51.49%	76,430	47.15%	2,207	1.36%

Senate Class 2 election results

United States Senate election results for Monmouth County, New Jersey2
Year	Republican		Democratic		Third party(ies)	
Year	No.	%	No.	%	No.	%
2020	191,700	51.48%	173,609	46.62%	7,045	1.89%
2014	79,417	53.20%	67,011	44.89%	2,863	1.92%
2013	59,059	53.87%	49,340	45.01%	1,231	1.12%
2008	150,238	51.90%	132,189	45.67%	7,034	2.43%
2002	88,424	51.28%	79,730	46.24%	4,278	2.48%
1996	109,173	47.63%	108,060	47.14%	11,987	5.23%
1990	80,126	50.92%	74,934	47.62%	2,298	1.46%
1984	80,093	35.74%	142,084	63.40%	1,914	0.85%

=== State elections ===
Governor election results

Gubernatorial election results for Monmouth County, New Jersey
Year	Republican		Democratic		Third party(ies)	
Year	No.	%	No.	%	No.	%
2025	154,166	53.69%	131,484	45.79%	1,503	0.52%
2021	141,100	58.84%	96,664	40.31%	2,024	0.84%
2017	101,525	55.02%	79,432	43.05%	3,572	1.94%
2013	123,417	70.67%	48,477	27.76%	2,753	1.58%
2009	129,039	65.93%	64,672	33.04%	2,023	1.03%
2005	101,085	51.93%	85,187	43.76%	8,376	4.30%
2001	89,987	48.52%	91,838	49.52%	3,647	1.97%
1997	105,535	53.89%	74,098	37.84%	16,189	8.27%
1993	111,303	54.78%	87,006	42.82%	4,859	2.39%
1989	72,403	40.93%	101,995	57.66%	2,498	1.41%
1985	109,238	72.90%	39,529	26.38%	1,084	0.72%
1981	88,873	55.92%	67,970	42.77%	2,090	1.32%
1977	62,031	42.42%	81,155	55.50%	3,042	2.08%
1973	39,345	29.34%	92,749	69.15%	2,028	1.51%
1969	89,957	64.55%	47,407	34.02%	2,003	1.44%
1965	58,959	47.22%	64,525	51.68%	1,365	1.09%
1961	61,513	54.76%	49,227	43.83%	1,584	1.41%
1957	47,520	49.66%	47,664	49.81%	499	0.52%
1953	43,046	52.41%	38,615	47.01%	474	0.58%

== Economy ==
The Bureau of Economic Analysis calculated that the county's gross domestic product was $34.2 billion in 2021, which was ranked ninth in the state and was a 6.1% increase from the prior year.

=== Housing expense ===
In 2015, the county had a per capita personal income of $69,410, the fifth-highest in New Jersey and ranked 74th of 3,113 counties in the United States. Monmouth County ranked 38th among the highest-income counties in the United States as of 2011, placing it among the top 1.2% of counties by wealth. As of 2009, it was ranked 56th in the United States by personal per-capita income.

=== Gentrification ===
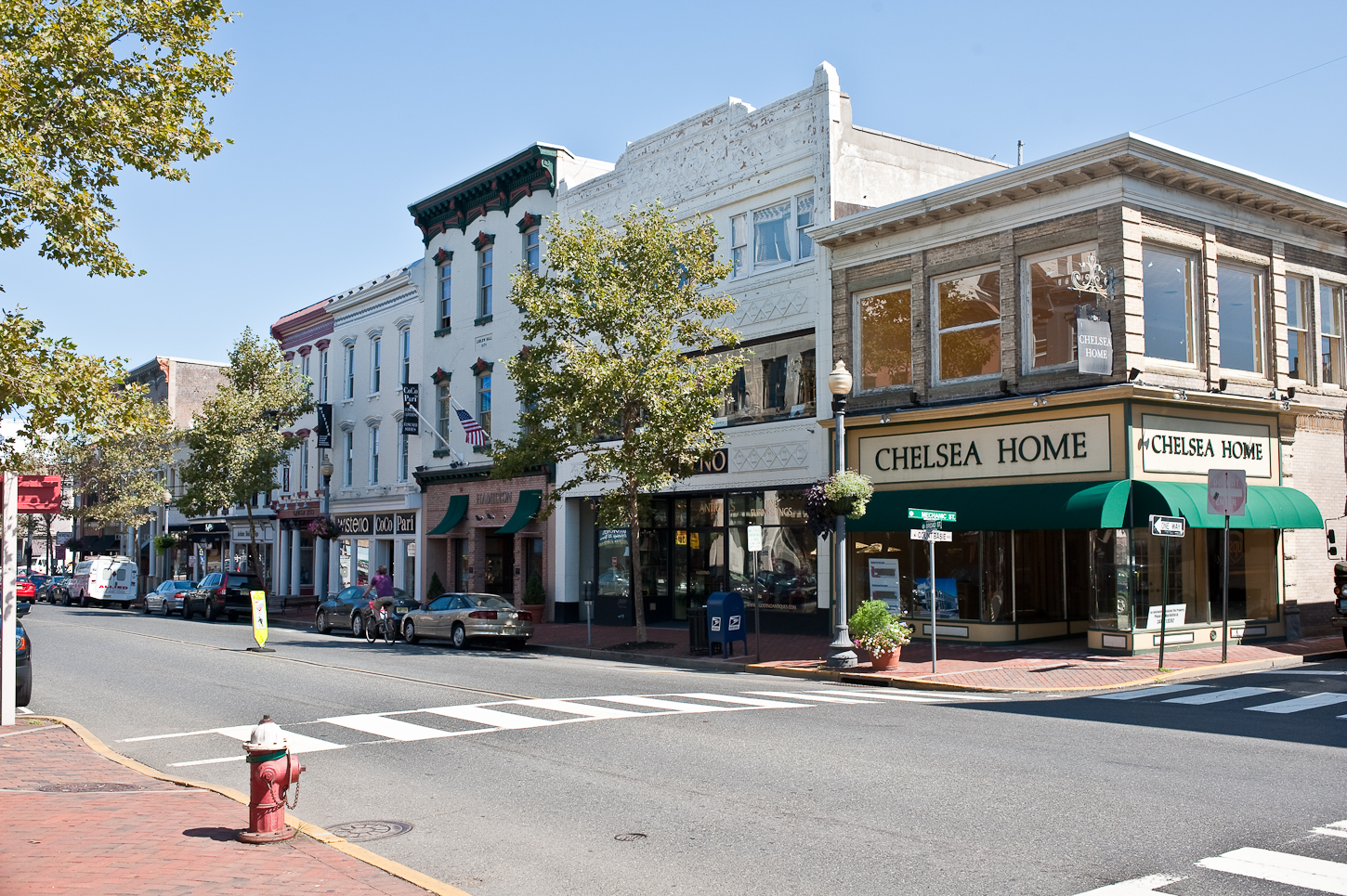

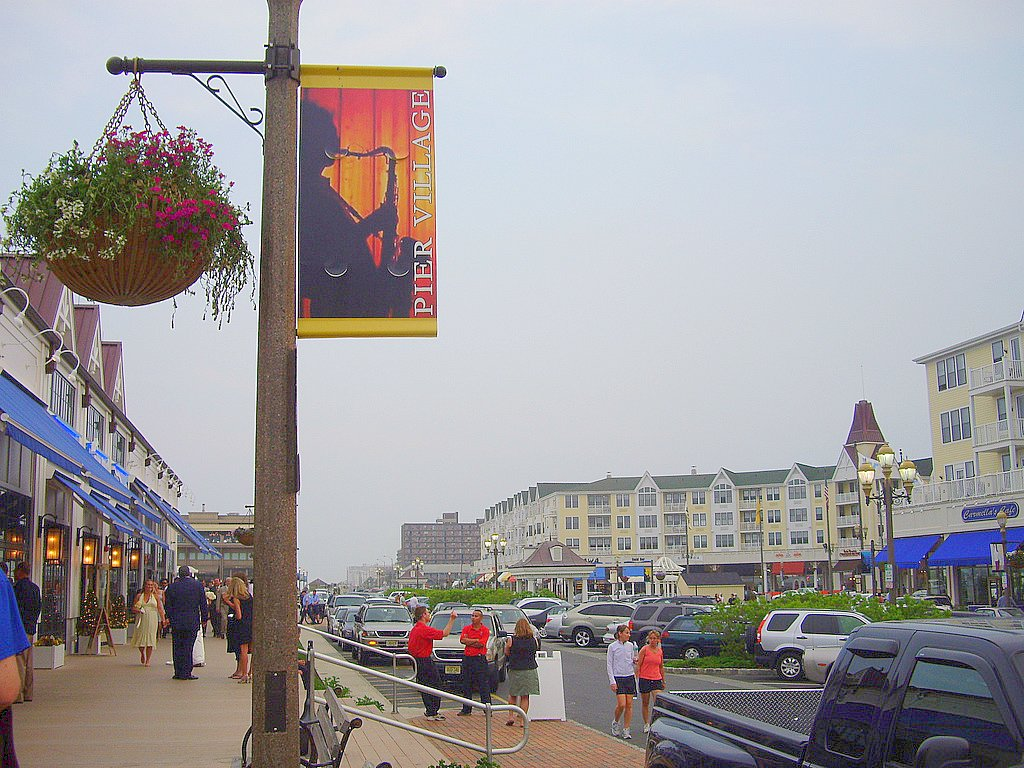
Tri-City region of urban centers in Monmouth County; Red Bank, Long Branch, and Asbury Park respectively

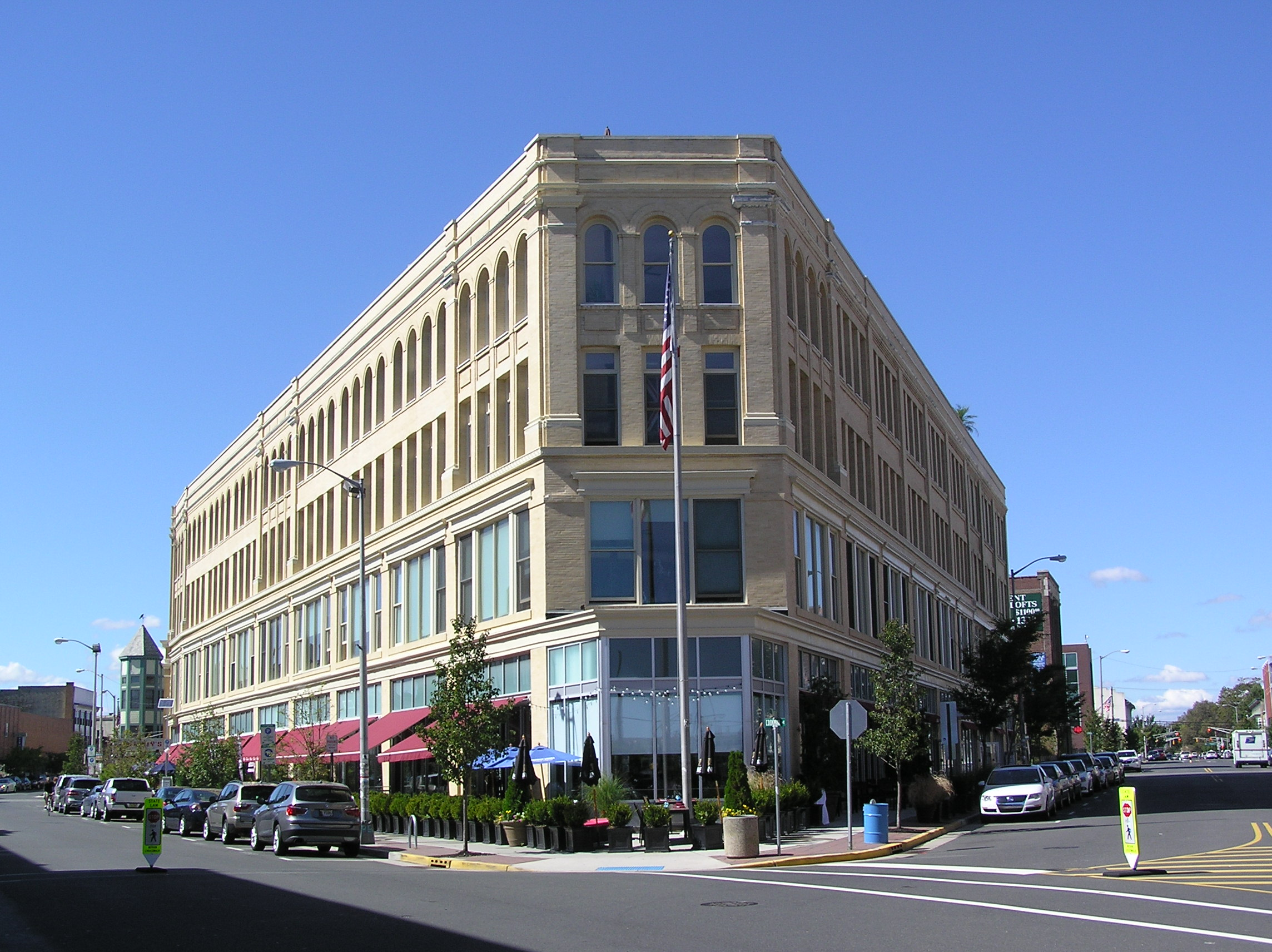

Hurricane Sandy in 2012 devastated much of the northern part of the Jersey Shore, particularly in Monmouth County. This necessitated the demolition and rebuilding of entire neighborhoods. Some were rebuilt to a higher economic level; this process of climate gentrification is rapidly escalating property values and transforming many communities along the Shore. Many houses have become vacation homes for the New York financial community, akin to shoreline communities on Long Island like the Gold Coast and The Hamptons.

=== Telecommunications and high technology ===
The Bell Labs Holmdel Complex became a business incubator for high-tech startup companies in 2016. Today Verizon Wireless, AT&T Communications, Vonage, Avaya, and Bell Labs are located in the region.

=== Commerce ===
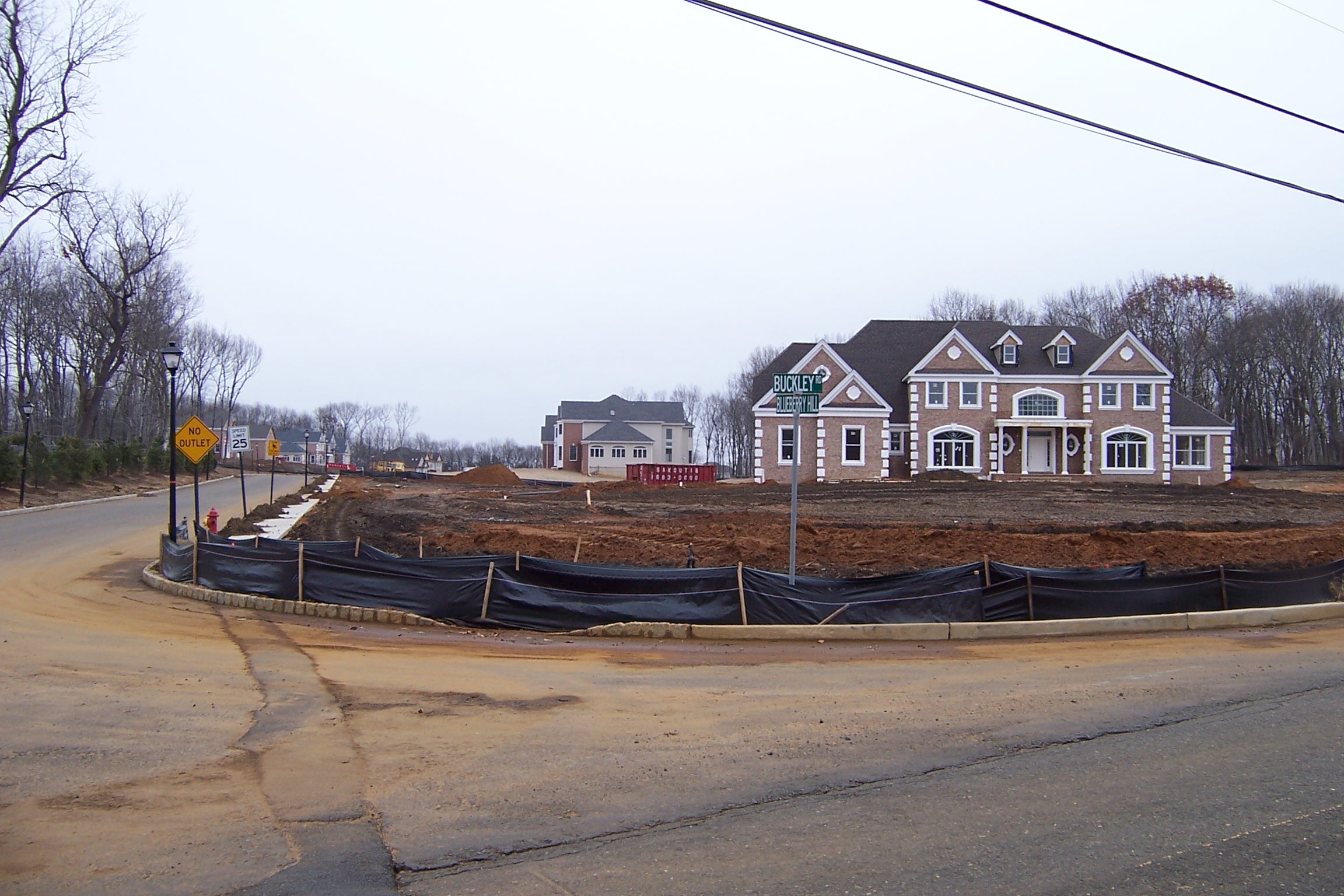
Wealthy home that was under construction in Marlboro Township, pictured Late 2005

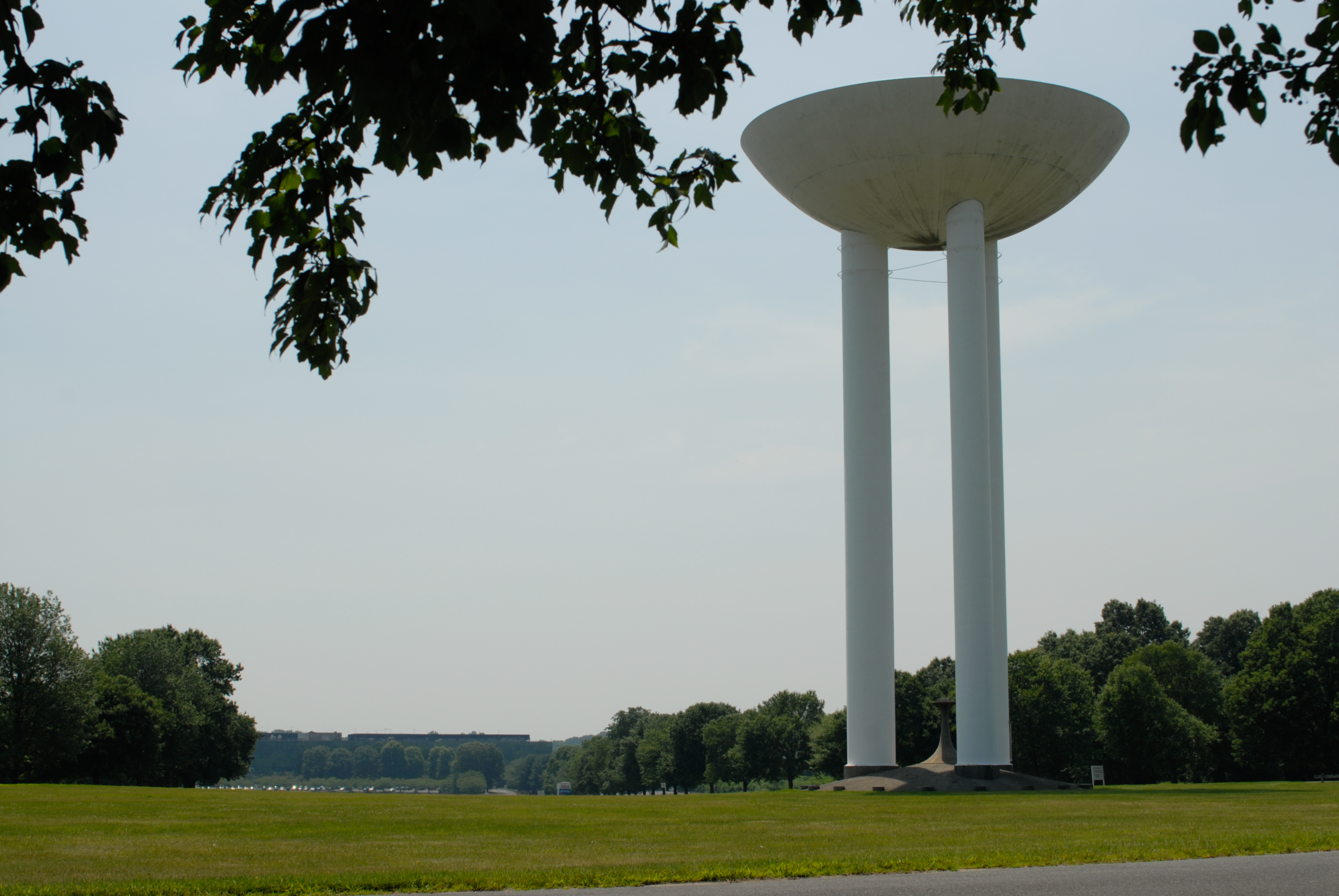
Bell Labs water tower in Holmdel Township was designed to resemble a transistor, an important invention

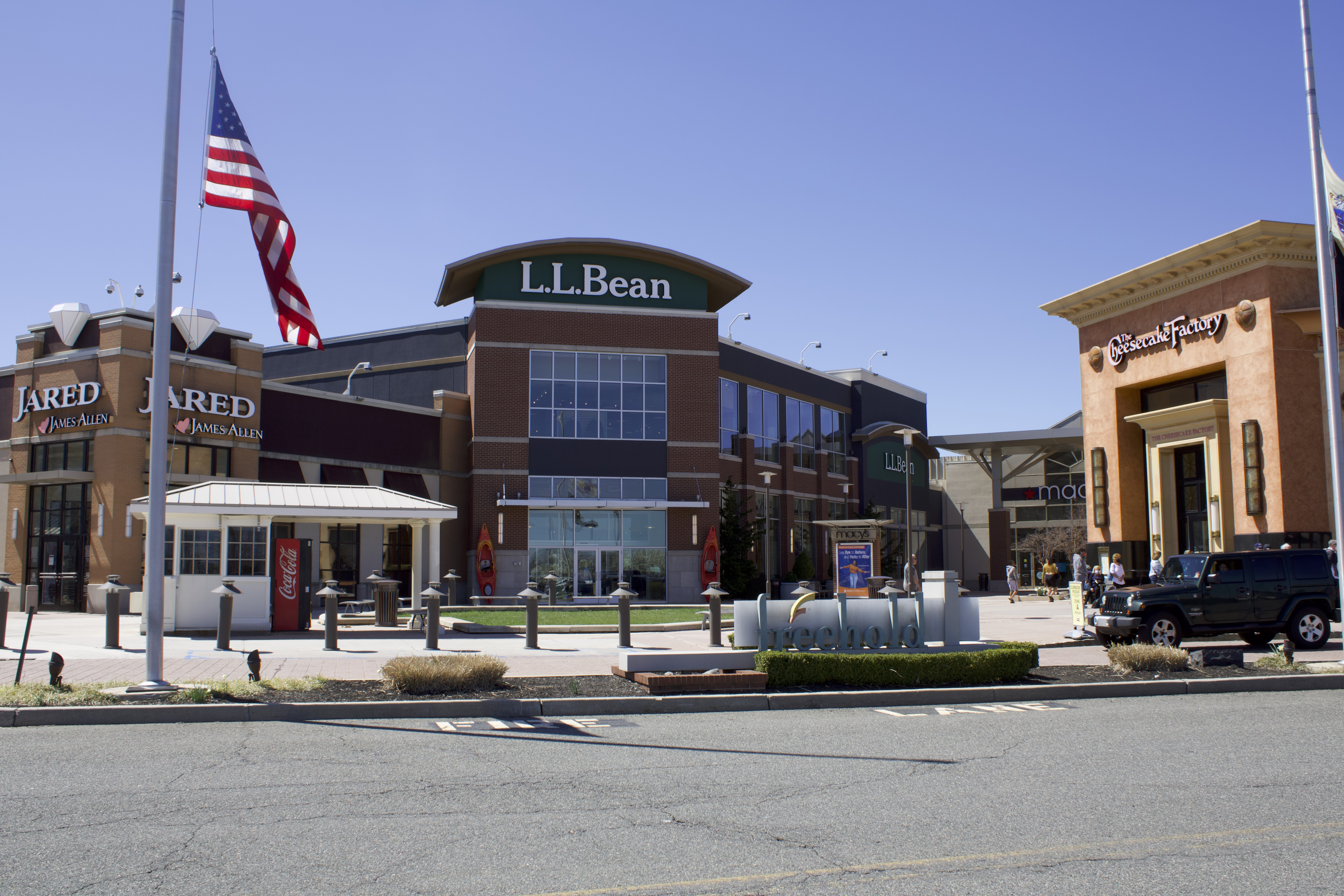
Freehold Raceway Mall, a super-regional shopping mall, located in Freehold Township

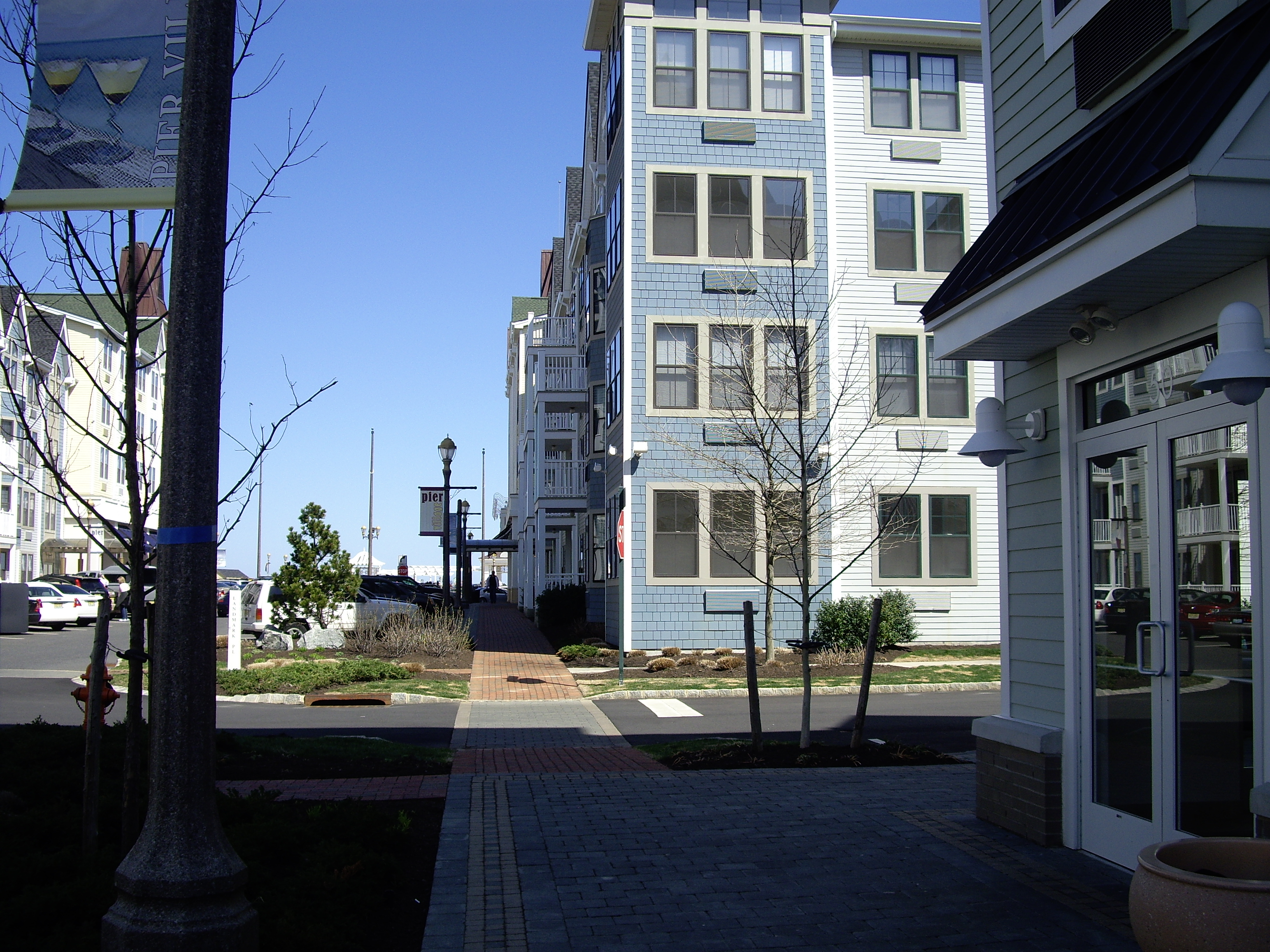
Pier Village, a Victorian-inspired mixed-use lifestyle center, located in Long Branch along the Atlantic Ocean

The county has been a commercial hub for the state and the larger northeastern United States for years. This is due to the county's location on the Jersey Shore, which attracts residents from North and South Jersey, along with the nearby states of New York, Pennsylvania, Connecticut, Delaware, and Maryland during the summer months. The region also boasts year-round attractions, such as hayrides, wine tasting, and apple picking during the autumn months. The county also features five major shopping malls:

- Freehold Raceway Mall
- Monmouth Mall
- Pier Village
- The Grove at Shrewsbury
- Jersey Shore Premium Outlets

== Education ==
=== Tertiary education ===
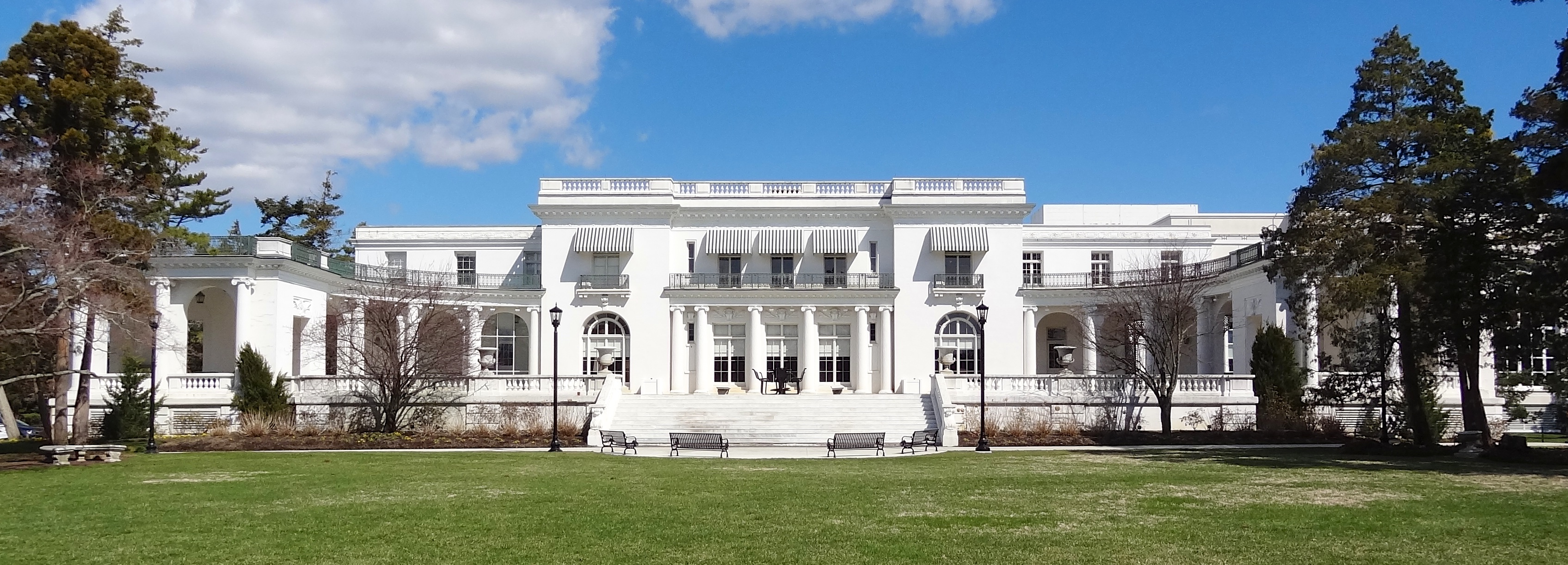
The Murry Guggenheim House, a Beaux-Arts mansion, designed by Carrère and Hastings in 1903 as a summer residence, is currently known as the Guggenheim Library at Monmouth University.

Monmouth University is a four-year private university located in West Long Branch that was founded in 1933 as Monmouth Junior College.

Brookdale Community College is the two-year community college for Monmouth County, one of a network of 19 county colleges statewide. The school is located in the Lincroft section of Middletown Township, having been founded in 1967.

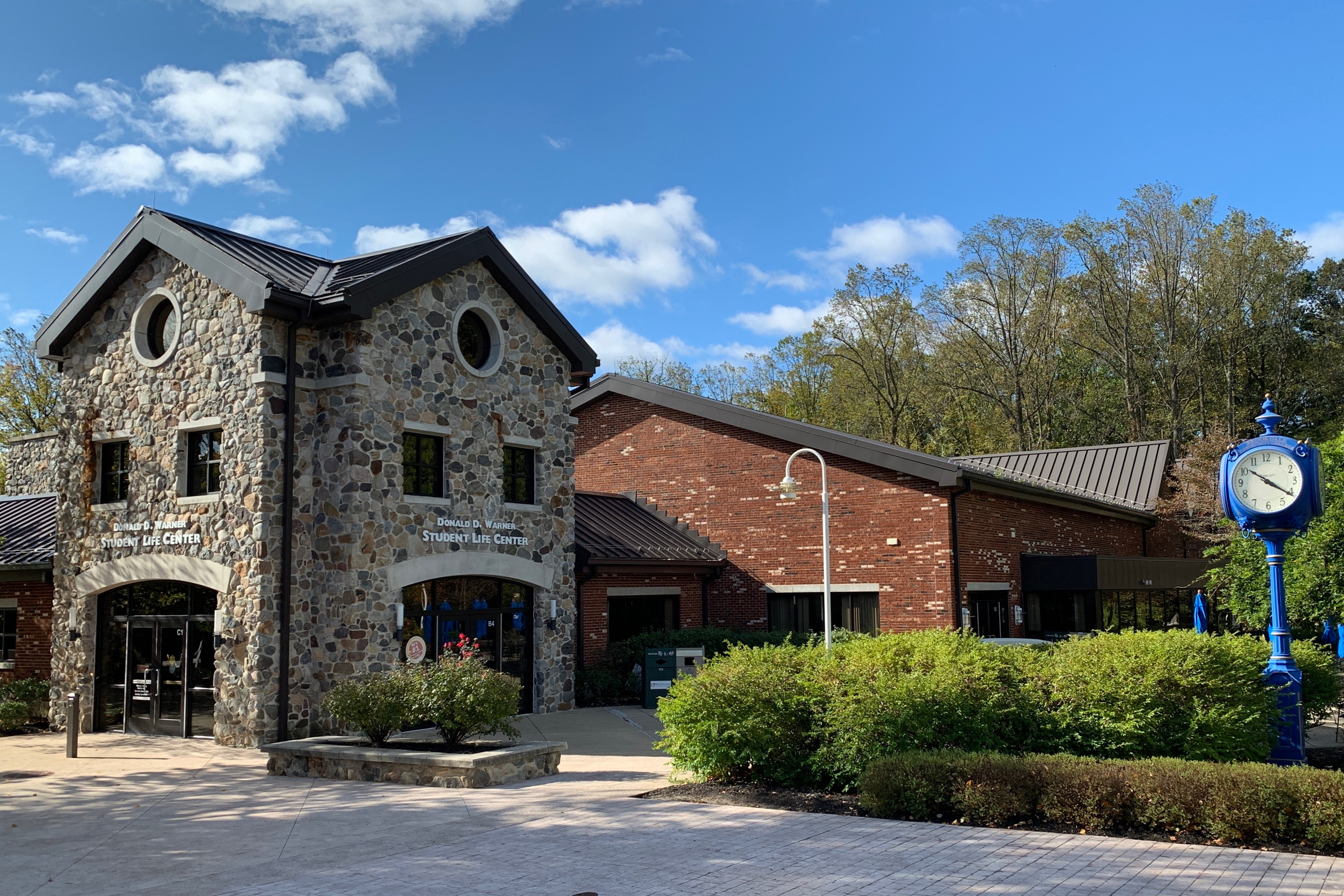
The Donald D. Warner Student Life Center at Brookdale Community College's main campus at Lincroft

Rutgers University has a partnership with Brookdale which offers bachelor's degree completion programs at Brookdale's Freehold campus.

=== K-12 education ===
School districts in Monmouth County include:

K-12 districts

- Asbury Park Public Schools
- Freehold Township Schools
- Hazlet Township Public Schools
- Henry Hudson Regional School District
- Holmdel Township Public Schools
- Keansburg School District
- Keyport Public Schools
- Long Branch Public Schools
- Manasquan Public Schools
- Matawan-Aberdeen Regional School District
- Middletown Township Public School District
- Monmouth County Vocational School District
- Neptune Township Schools
- Ocean Township School District
- Upper Freehold Regional School District – Regional
- Wall Township Public Schools

Secondary districts

- Freehold Regional High School District
- Monmouth Regional High School
- Red Bank Regional High School
- Rumson-Fair Haven Regional High School
- Shore Regional High School – Regional

Elementary districts(K-8, except as indicated)

- Atlantic Highlands School District (K-6)
- Avon School District
- Belmar School District
- Bradley Beach School District
- Brielle School District
- Colts Neck School District
- Deal School District
- Eatontown Public Schools
- Fair Haven Public Schools
- Farmingdale School District
- Freehold Borough Schools
- Freehold Township Schools
- Highlands School District (K-6)
- Howell Township Public Schools
- Little Silver School District
- Manalapan-Englishtown Regional School District
- Marlboro Township Public School District
- Millstone Township Schools
- Monmouth Beach School District
- Neptune City School District
- Oceanport School District
- Red Bank Borough Public Schools
- Roosevelt Public School District (K-5)
- Rumson School District
- Sea Girt School District
- Shrewsbury Borough School District
- Spring Lake School District
- Spring Lake Heights School District
- Tinton Falls School District – Regional
- Union Beach School System
- West Long Branch Public Schools

In addition to multiple public high schools, parochial schools in Monmouth County include St. Rose High School, Red Bank Catholic High School, Christian Brothers Academy, St. John Vianney High School, and Mater Dei High School, which operate under the auspices of the Diocese of Trenton. A secular private school, Ranney School, is also located in the county.

The county has an extensive vocational high school program, known as the Monmouth County Vocational School District, which includes five magnet schools (with 2023–24 enrollment data from the National Center for Education Statistics) which are:

- Academy of Allied Health & Science in Neptune Township (with 304 students; in grades 9–12)
- Academy of Law and Public Safety in Long Branch (70; 9–12)
- Biotechnology High School in Freehold Borough (320; 9–12)
- Communications High School in Wall Township (299; 9–12)
- High Technology High School in the Lincroft section of Middletown Township (284; 9-12)
- Marine Academy of Science and Technology in Sandy Hook in Middletown Township (273; 9–12)

== Arts and culture ==
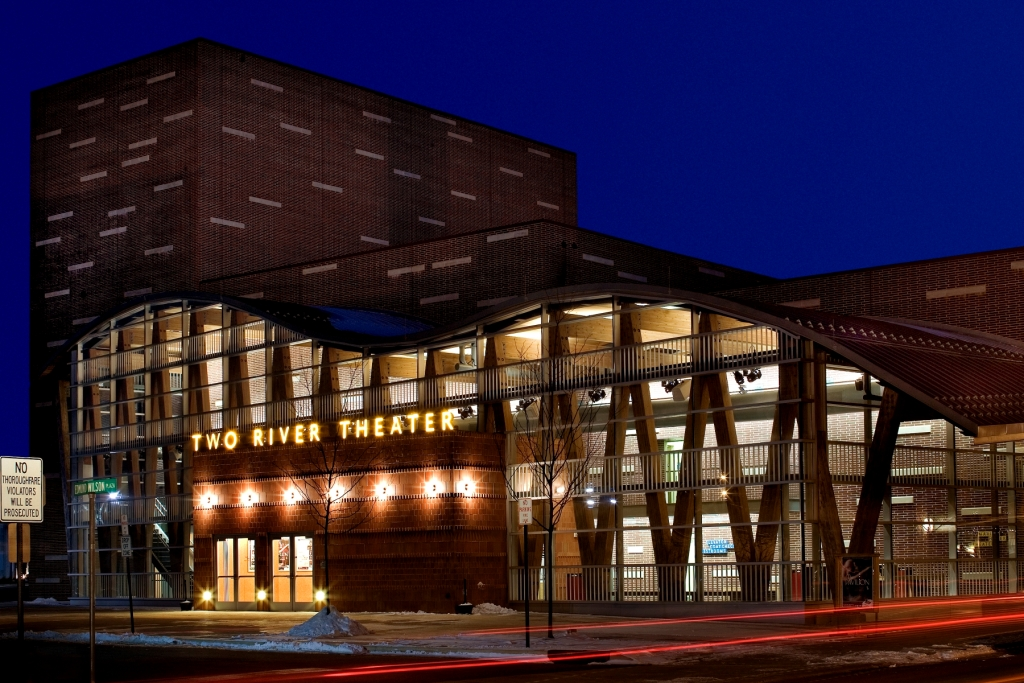
The Two River Theater

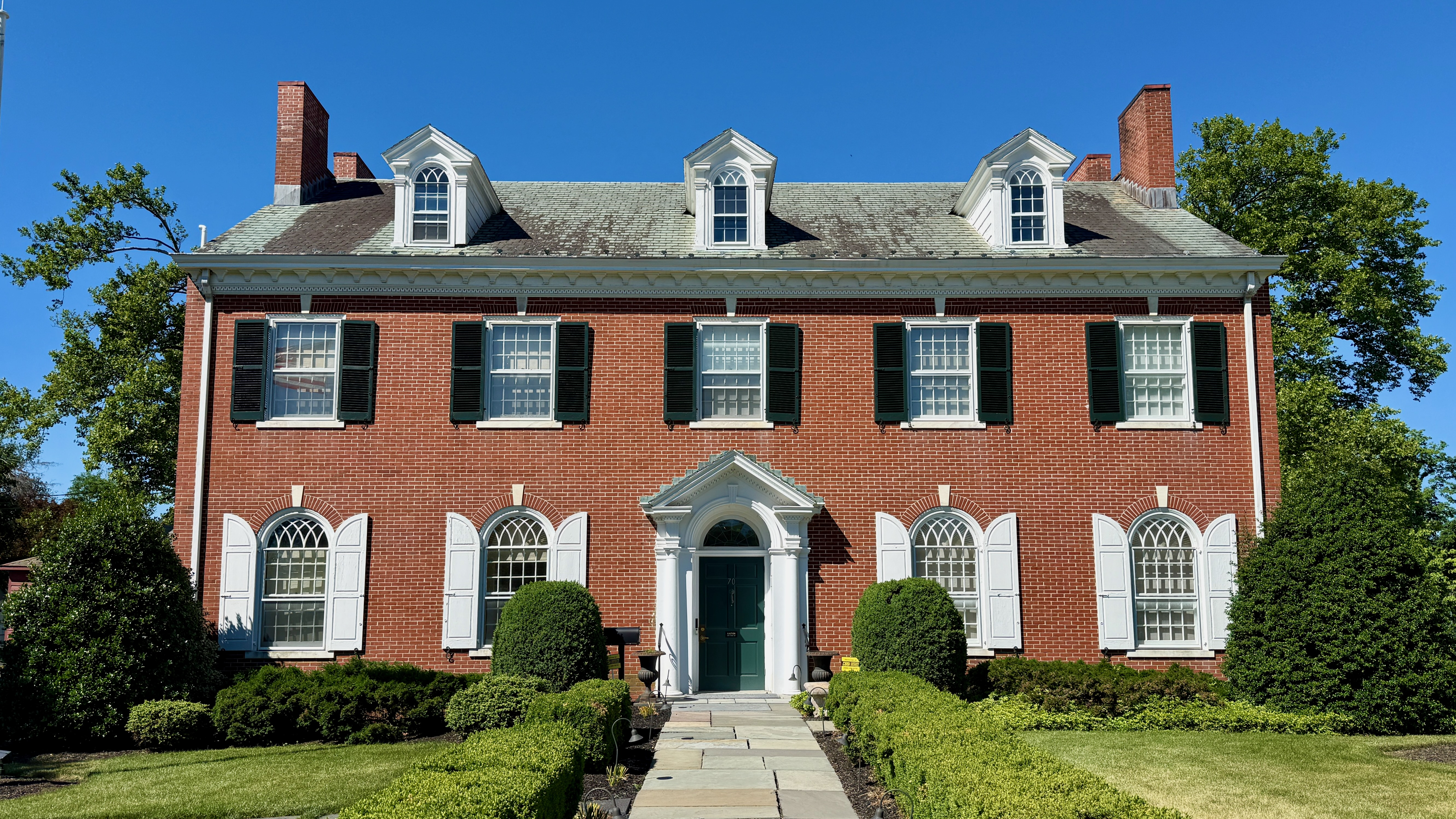
Monmouth County Historical Association headquarters

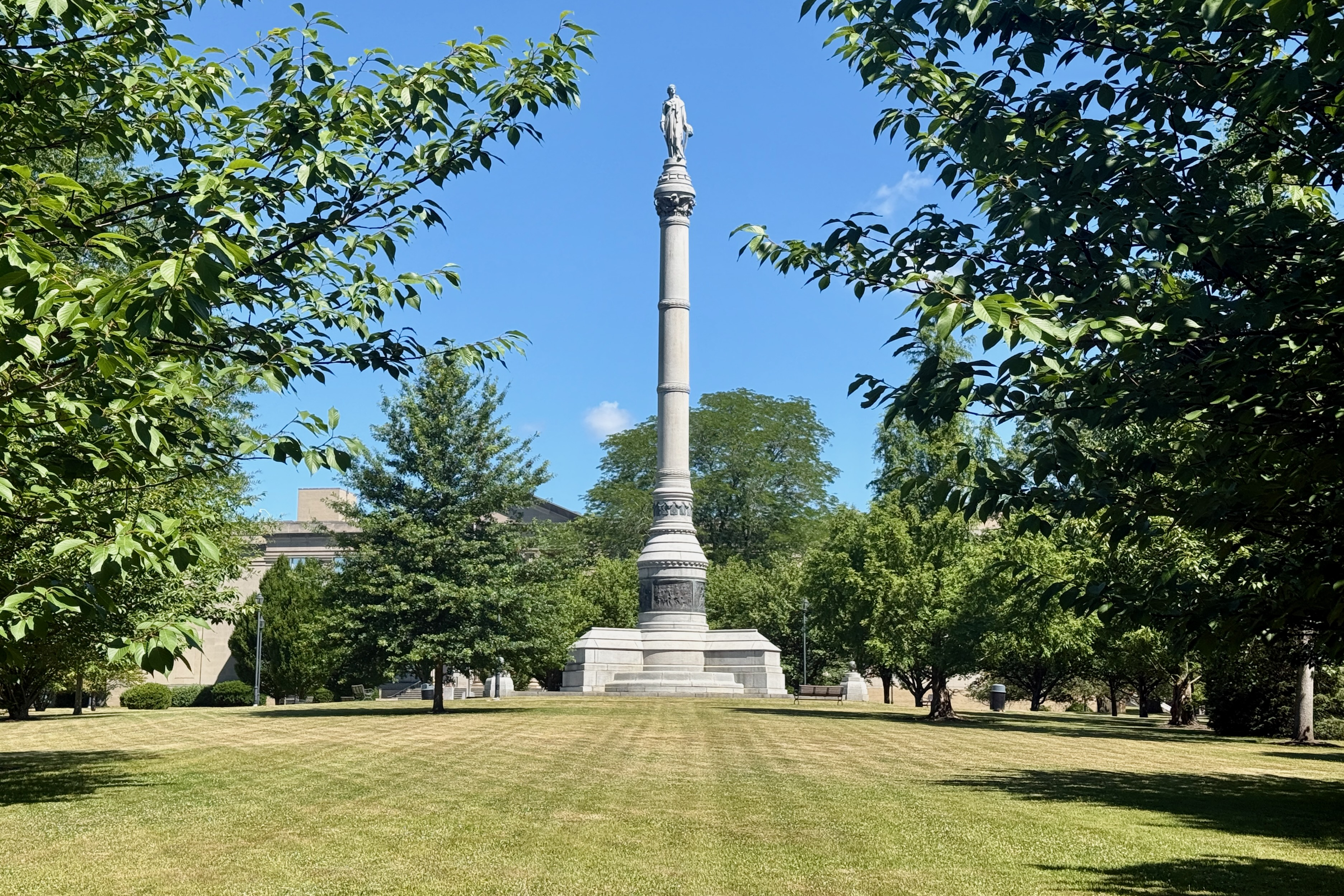
Monmouth Battle Monument

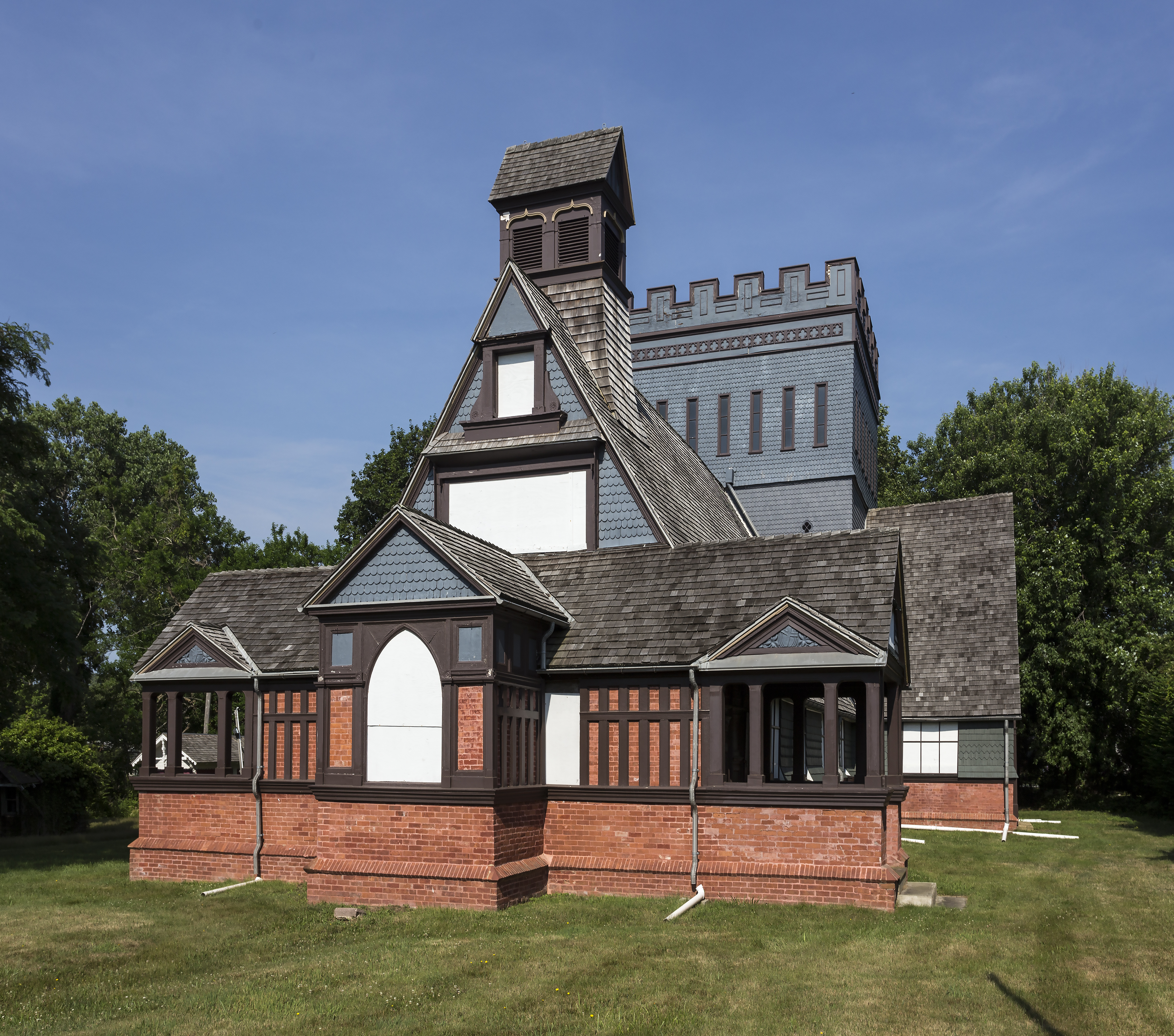
Church of the Presidents

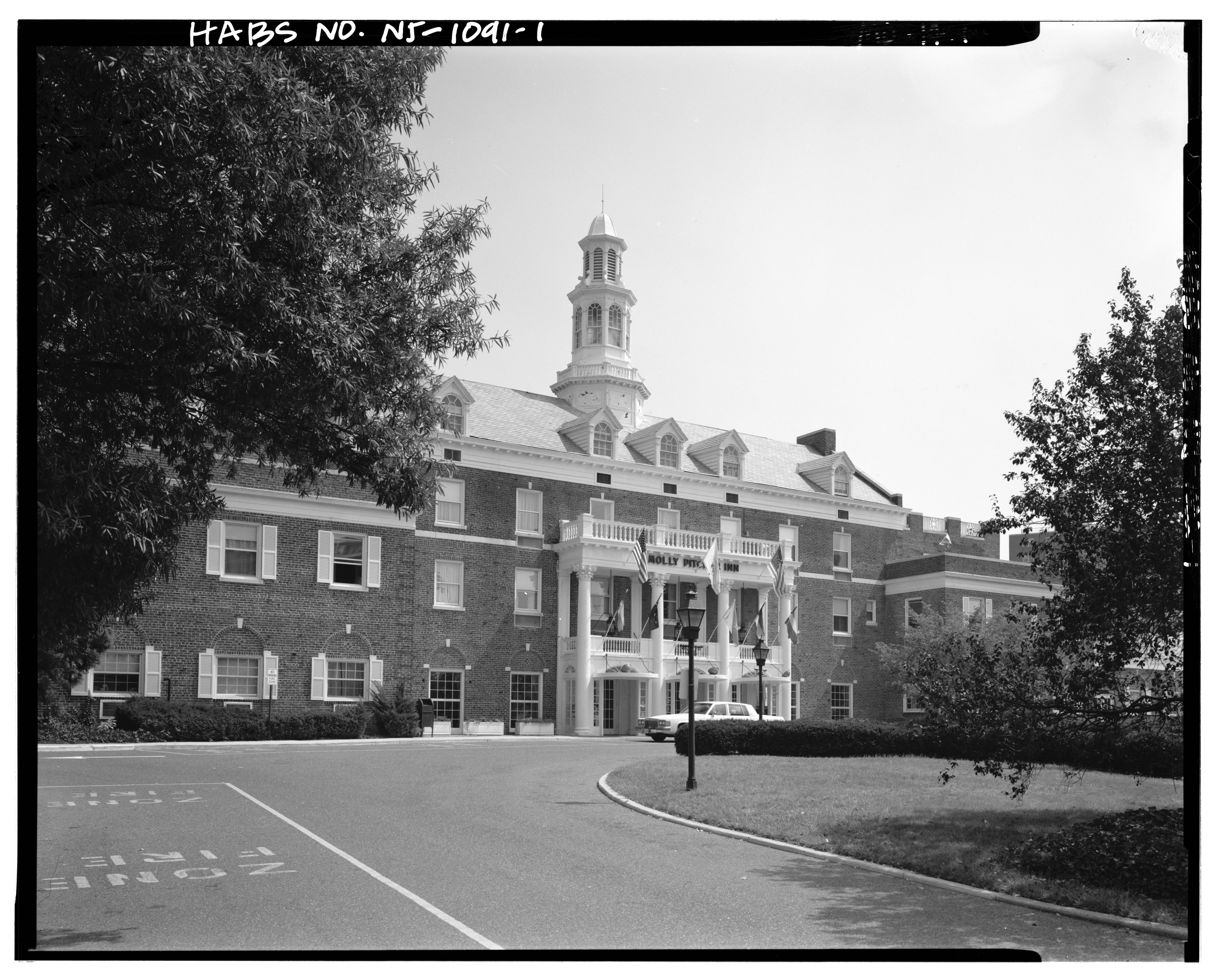
The Molly Pitcher Inn

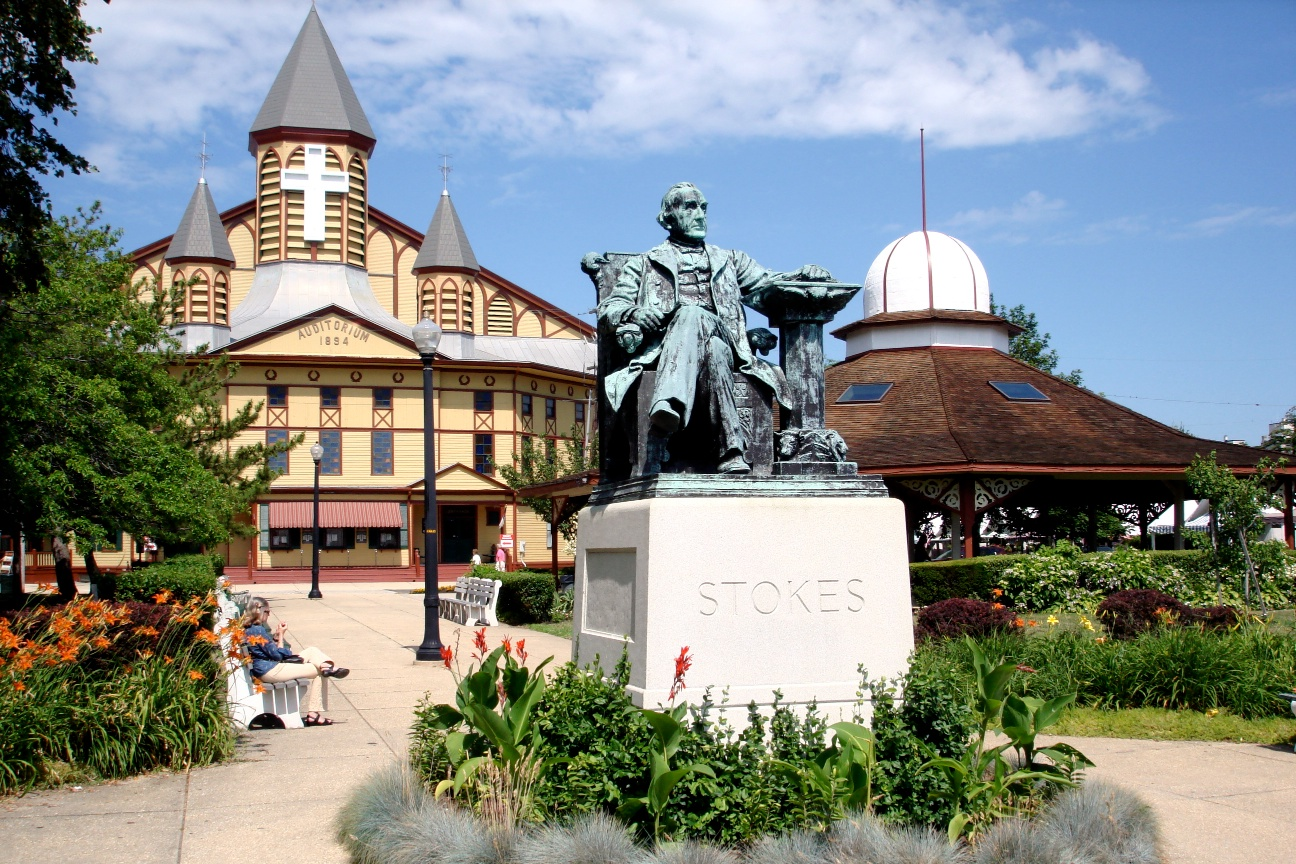
Ocean Grove Camp Meeting Association District

- Count Basie Theatre - A landmarked performing arts center in Red Bank. The core structure opened as the "Carlton Theater" in 1926, became the "Monmouth Arts Center" in 1973, then was renamed to the "Count Basie Theatre" in 1984 to honor jazz great and Red Bank native William "Count" Basie. It was designed by William E. Lehman and has seating capacity for 1,568 patrons.
- Two River Theater - A professional, not-for-profit, regional theater company producing plays and educational programs. The company received "Theatre of the Year" awards from the New Jersey Theatre Alliance in 2006, and from The Star-Ledger in both 2006 and 2008. At the July 2009 meeting of the New Jersey State Council on the Arts, Two River Theater was designated as a Major Impact Organization.
- Monmouth County Historical Association – Established in 1898 by a group of county residents headed by professional educator Caroline Gallup Reed, it was soon incorporated in order “to discover, procure, preserve and perpetuate whatever relates to the history of Monmouth County.” The headquarters are located in Freehold Borough in a brick Georgian-style building designed by architect J. Hallam Conover.
- Monmouth County Jewish Heritage Museum - focuses on Jewish life in the county, which dates back to 1720.
- Monmouth Battlefield State Park — Located in Freehold Township and Manalapan Township, the park preserves a rural eighteenth-century landscape of orchards, fields, woods and wetlands, encompassing miles of trails for hiking and horseback riding, space for picnic areas, and four restored Revolutionary War farmhouses that were associated with the American Revolutionary War's Battle of Monmouth, including the Craig House, the Cobb House, the Sutfin House, and the Rhea-Applegate House. The park includes a visitor center with replicas of eighteenth-century canons and other exhibits.
- Gateway National Recreation Area at Sandy Hook - The barrier peninsula segment of the much larger Gateway National Recreation Area (which has other sections in Staten Island, Brooklyn, and Queens in New York) forms the other side of the "gateway" to New York Harbor. It includes two main park sites:
  - Fort Hancock served as part of the harbor's coastal defense system from 1895 until 1974 and contains 100 historic buildings and fortifications.
  - Sandy Hook contains seven beaches, including Gunnison Beach, a nude beach by custom, as well as salt marshes and a maritime holly forest. Ferries from Manhattan are available in season. Fishing and using hand-launched vessels are popular here.
- Monmouth County Courthouse – In front of the courthouse, is a park at the center of town which hosts a 90-foot (27 m) tall monument to the Battle of Monmouth at its center.
- St. Peter's Episcopal Church — a historic Episcopal church building that was constructed in 1771, featuring Georgian and Gothic Revival elements.
- Ocean Grove Camp Meeting Association District - An association founded in 1869 by a group of Methodist clergymen, led by William B. Osborn and Ellwood H. Stokes. Its mission is to "provide opportunities for spiritual birth, growth, and renewal in a Christian seaside setting." It was to operate as a summer camp meeting site on the New Jersey seashore. By the early 20th century, the popular Christian meeting ground became known as the "Queen of Religious Resorts." The community's land is still owned by the camp meeting association and leased to individual homeowners and businesses. Ocean Grove remains the longest-active camp meeting site in the United States.
- Church of the Presidents - Originally consecrated in 1879 as St. James Protestant Episcopal Chapel, a branch of St. James Episcopal Church, this former Episcopal chapel was where seven United States presidents during the Victorian era worshipped. It was visited by presidents Ulysses S. Grant, Rutherford B. Hayes, James A. Garfield, Chester A. Arthur, Benjamin Harrison, William McKinley, and Woodrow Wilson. All except Grant were in office when they paid their visits to the church.
- Seabrook–Wilson House – Nicknamed the "Spy House" by local residents, the house was built in 1663 in the town of Port Monmouth, a part of Middletown Township, making it the oldest structure in Monmouth County and one of the oldest in the state. The house's architecture was emblematic of the early English influence in the county. For most of its history, the farm on Sandy Hook Bay was home to generations of two prominent Port Monmouth families, the Seabrooks and the Wilsons. Ship owners and captains, a Revolutionary War militia officer, local business owners and investors, and a clergyman were part of these notable families, many of whom served in local government positions.
- Allaire State Park - Historic park, known for its restored 19th century ironworks, Allaire Village, which is a living history museum on the park premises. It was a prosperous industrial town producing pig iron and cast iron from the surrounding bog iron deposits. The buildings which remain and have been restored today include a general store, blacksmith shop, carpenter's shop, manager's house, foreman's house and a church. One of the workers' row house buildings has been recreated and now houses a visitor center, museum, and reenactments of nineteenth-century life in this bustling mill town. The historic village is run by a non-profit organization independent of the park and charges a nominal fee to enter the buildings. It is named after James P. Allaire, founder of the Howell Works at the same site. The park also hosts the Pine Creek Railroad, a tourist railroad.
- Holmdel Park - Located in Holmdel Township, this massive park is part of the Monmouth County Park System. The initial park land was established in 1962, with an additional 227 acres (92 ha) section added in 2001. The park's recreational offerings include fishing (with permit), individual and group picnic areas, tennis courts, playgrounds and 10 miles of hiking trails. Ice skating and sledding are permitted when conditions are deemed safe. The park contains four distinct visitor areas, each with its own parking; three are accessed via the main park entrance while the fourth is located at the activity center further north on Longstreet Road. The park also features:
  - Holmdel Arboretum - Also known as the David C. Shaw Arboretum, which contains nearly 3,000 trees and shrubs, representing hundreds of species, cultivars, and varieties, including the Jane Kluis Memorial Dwarf Conifer Garden, a collection of true cedars (Cedrus) in honor of David Rossheim, and a variety of other plantings such as weeping Atlas cedar, cherry trees, Amur cork tree, among many others. A map at the entrance identifies the major plant collections.
  - Longstreet Farm - A living history farm museum displaying a recreation of life in the 1890s. Workers dress in period costume, and perform the activities of a resident of the time period, such as planting and harvesting of crops, and taking caring of livestock. The Holmes-Hendrickson House, built in 1754, is a museum operated by the Monmouth County Historical Association near the farm.

=== Sports ===
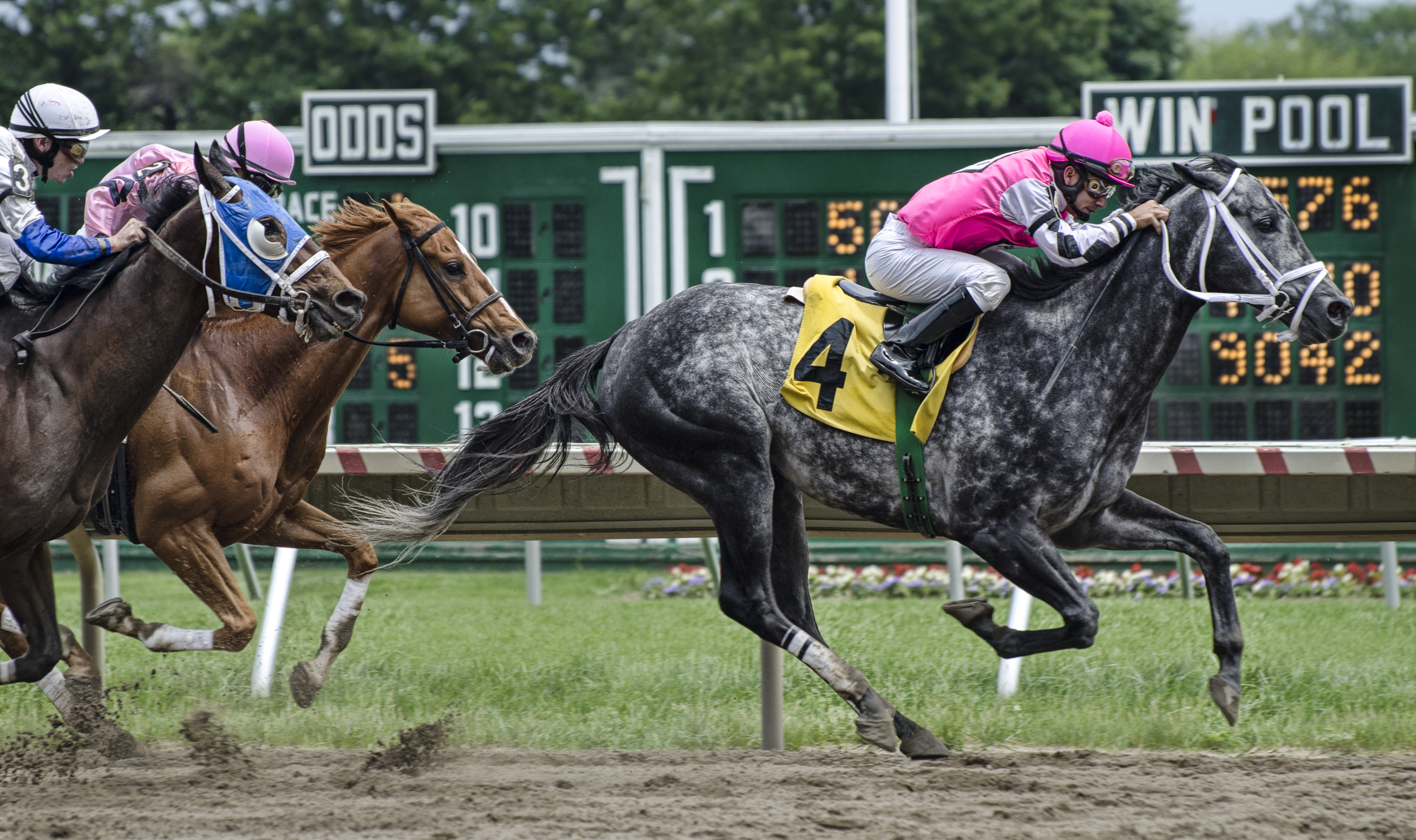
Monmouth Park Racetrack

Monmouth Park Racetrack in Oceanport and Freehold Raceway in Freehold offer fans of thoroughbred horse racing a chance to bet on races. Freehold Raceway announced in September 2024 that they will close, with the final racing date being December 28.

In 1943, the New York Yankees held their spring training in Asbury Park instead of Florida. This was because rail transport had to be conserved during the war, and Major League Baseball's Spring Training was limited to an area east of the Mississippi River and north of the Ohio River.

== Parks and recreation ==
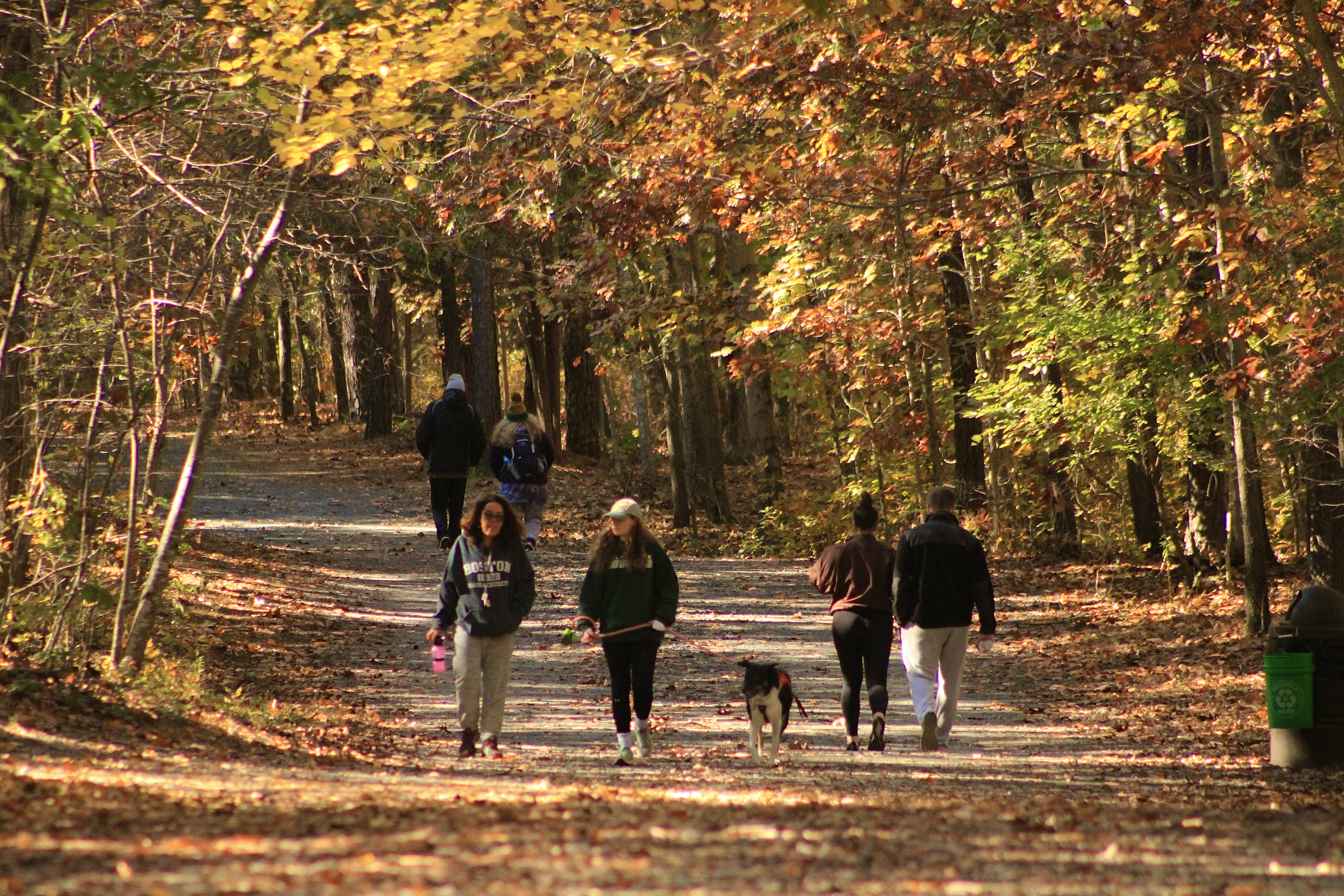
Manasquan Reservoir on a calm afternoon in Howell Township

Monmouth County parks are under the administration of the Monmouth County Park System. Established in 1960, the agency that maintains over 40 parks and recreational areas, in Monmouth County. General parks include Turkey Swamp Park, Manasquan Reservoir, Holmdel Park, Freneau Woods Park, Crosswicks Creek Park, and Seven Presidents Oceanfront Park, among many others. There are also three major bike trails (which were formerly rail-lines) in the county, the Union Transportation Trail in the southwestern section of the county (near the Delaware Valley region), the Edgar Felix Bikeway in the southeastern section of the county (near the Jersey Shore region), and the Henry Hudson Trail in the western and northern sections of the county (near the Raritan Bayshore and Raritan Valley regions).

The county also has two major state parks, Monmouth Battlefield State Park and Allaire State Park, along with a section of the Gateway National Recreation Area at the Sandy Hook Unit.

=== National protected area ===
- Gateway National Recreation Area (part)

=== Wineries, breweries, and distilleries ===
The county is home to several wineries, including:

- Basil T's Brewery
- Carton Brewing
- Cream Ridge Winery
- Four JG's Orchards & Vineyards
- Kane Brewing
- Laird & Company
- Peppadew Fresh Vineyards

=== Other points of interest ===
- Keansburg Amusement Park & Runaway Rapids
- PNC Bank Arts Center
- Pier Village
- Asbury Park Boardwalk
- Freehold Raceway Mall
- Monmouth Mall
- iPlay America
- Numerous beaches along the Jersey Shore
- Monmouth Executive Airport
- Holmdel Cemetery & Mausoleum
- Twin Pond Farm

== Municipalities ==
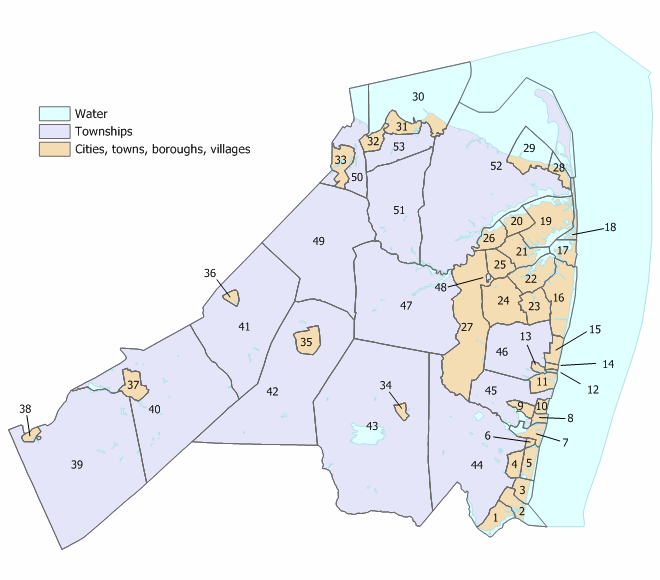
Index map of Monmouth County municipalities (click to see index key)

Interactive map of municipalities in Monmouth County.

The 53 municipalities in Monmouth County (with 2010 Census data for housing units and area in square miles, as well as 2018 estimates for population) are listed below. Other, unincorporated communities in the county are listed next to their parent municipality. Many of these areas are census-designated places (labeled as CDPs) that have been created by the United States Census Bureau for enumeration purposes within a township, with the 2010 Census population listed. Other communities and enclaves that exist within a municipality are also listed.

Municipality	Map index	Mun. type	Pop.	Housing units	Total area	Water area	Land area	Pop. density	Housing density	School district	Unincorporated communities
Aberdeen	50	township	19,329	7,102	7.77	2.33	5.45	3,343.0	1,303.8	Matawan-Aberdeen	Cliffwood; Cliffwood Beach CDP (3,036); Henningers Mills; Strathmore CDP (7,225)
Allenhurst	14	borough	472	365	0.28	0.02	0.26	1,887.9	1,389.3	Shore Regional (9-12) (S/R); West Long Branch (K-8) (S/R)	
Allentown	38	borough	1,734	735	0.63	0.03	0.60	3,023.9	1,215.8	Upper Freehold Regional	
Asbury Park	11	city	15,188	8,076	1.60	0.18	1.42	11,319.5	5,672.4	Asbury Park	
Atlantic; Highlands	29	borough	4,414	2,002	4.56	3.27	1.29	3,401.2	1,552.9	Henry Hudson Regional	Hilton; Stone Church
Avon-by- the-Sea	8	borough	1,933	1,321	0.54	0.12	0.43	4,459.1	3,098.6	Manasquan (9-12) (S/R); Avon (K-8)	
Belmar	7	borough	5,907	3,931	1.65	0.60	1.05	5,544.0	3,761.4	Manasquan (9-12) (S/R); Belmar (PK-8)	
Bradley Beach	10	borough	4,282	3,180	0.63	0.02	0.61	7,023.6	5,196.6	Asbury Park (9-12) (S/R) (93%); Neptune Twp (9-12) (S/R) (7%); Bradley Beach (PK-8)	
Brielle	1	borough	4,982	2,034	2.37	0.62	1.76	2,717.5	1,157.8	Manasquan (9-12) (S/R); Brielle (PK-8)	Manasquan Park
Colts Neck	47	township	9,957	3,735	31.79	1.06	30.73	330.0	121.5	Freehold Regional (9-12); Colts Neck (PK-8)	Bucks Mill; Colonial Terrace; Cooks Mills; Montrose; Phalanx; Scobeyville; Vanderburg
Deal	15	borough	900	926	1.32	0.08	1.24	604.8	746.7	Shore Regional (9-12); Deal (K-8)	
Eatontown	24	borough	13,597	5,723	5.88	0.05	5.83	2,181.5	982.3	Monmouth Regional (9-12); Eatontown (PK-8)	
Englishtown	36	borough	2,346	647	0.59	0.02	0.57	3,245.7	1,137.0	Freehold Regional (9-12); Manalapan-Englishtown (PK-8)	
Fair Haven	20	borough	6,269	2,065	2.11	0.51	1.60	3,832.5	1,292.9	Rumson-Fair Haven (9-12); Fair Haven (PK-8)	
Farmingdale	34	borough	1,504	578	0.52	0.00	0.52	2,547.7	1,108.0	Freehold Regional (9-12); Farmingdale (PK-8)	
Freehold Borough	35	borough	12,538	4,249	1.95	0.00	1.95	6,180.8	2,179.1	Freehold Regional (9-12); Freehold (PK-8)	
Freehold Township	42	township	35,369	13,140	38.73	0.22	38.50	939.8	341.3	Freehold Regional (9-12); Freehold Township (PK-8)	Burlington Heights; East Freehold CDP (4,987); Georgia; Monmouth Heights; Orchard Estates; Siloam; Smithburg; Stonehurst East; Stonehurst West; West Freehold CDP (13,596)
Hazlet	53	township	20,125	7,417	5.67	0.12	5.56	3,659.4	1,334.8	Hazlet Township	Centerville; Mechanicsville; North Centerville; Tiltons Corner; Van Marters Corner; West Keansburg
Highlands	28	borough	4,621	3,146	1.37	0.60	0.77	6,522.8	4,100.1	Henry Hudson Regional	Waterwitch
Holmdel	51	township	17,400	5,792	18.11	0.22	17.90	937.3	323.7	Holmdel Township	Centerville; Crawford Corners; Everett; Morrells Corner; Pleasant Valley Crossroads
Howell	43	township	53,537	17,979	61.21	0.65	60.56	843.4	296.9	Freehold Regional (9-12); Howell Township (PK-8)	Adelphia; Ardena; Ardmore Estates; Bergerville; Candlewood; Collingwood Park; Fairfield; Fort Plains; Freewood Acres; Jerseyville; Lake Club; Land of Pines; Larrabees; Lower Squankum; Matthews; Maxim; Oak Glen; Parkway Pines; Ramtown CDP (6,329); Salem Hill; Shacks Corner; Southard; Squankum; West Farms; Winston Park; Wyckoff Mills
Interlaken	13	borough	828	393	0.38	0.05	0.33	2,482.3	1,189.7	Shore Regional (9-12) (S/R); West Long Branch (K-8) (S/R)	
Keansburg	30	borough	9,755	4,318	16.79	15.72	1.07	9,452.3	4,039.1	Keansburg	Tiltons Corner
Keyport	32	borough	7,204	3,272	1.47	0.07	1.40	5,188.4	2,344.8	Keyport	
Lake Como	6	borough	1,697	1,115	0.27	0.01	0.25	6,943.6	4,401.4	Manasquan (9-12) (S/R); Belmar (PK-8) (S/R)	
Little Silver	21	borough	6,131	2,278	3.32	0.61	2.71	2,197.3	841.3	Red Bank Regional (9-12); Little Silver (PK-8)	Little Silver Point
Loch Arbour	12	village	194	159	0.14	0.04	0.10	1,928.2	1,580.4	Shore Regional (9-12) (S/R); West Long Branch (K-8) (S/R)	
Long Branch	16	city	31,667	14,170	6.28	1.01	5.27	5,824.4	2,686.7	Long Branch	Branchport; East Long Branch; Elberon; North Long Branch; Pier Village; West End
Manalapan	41	township	40,905	13,735	30.84	0.23	30.61	1,270.0	448.8	Freehold Regional (9-12); Manalapan-Englishtown (PK-8)	Clarks Mills; Elton; Gordons Corner; Lafayette Mills; Millhurst; Monmouth Heights; Oakland Mills; Smithburg; Taylors Mills; Tennent; Whittier Oaks; Yorketown CDP (6,617)
Manasquan	2	borough	5,938	3,500	2.53	1.15	1.38	4,263.0	2,530.2	Manasquan	
Marlboro	49	township	41,502	13,436	30.47	0.11	30.36	1,323.7	442.5	Freehold Regional (9-12); Marlboro Township (PK-8)	Beacon Hill; Bradevelt; Claytons Corner; Henningers Mills; Herberts Corner; Hillsdale; Marlboro; Monmouth Heights; Montrose; Morganville CDP (6,203); Mount Pleasant; Pleasant Valley; Robertsville CDP (11,399); Smocks Corner; Spring Valley; Wickatunk
Matawan	33	borough	9,565	3,606	2.40	0.14	2.26	3,896.6	1,594.9	Matawan-Aberdeen	Freneau
Middletown	52	township	67,106	24,959	58.73	17.75	40.99	1,622.9	608.9	Middletown Township	Belford CDP (1,648); Chapel Hill; East Keansburg; Everett; Fairview CDP (3,731); Harmony; Hendrickson Corners; Holland; Leonardo CDP (2,549); Leonardville; Lincroft CDP (7,060); Locust; Monmouth Hills; Navesink CDP (2,004); New Monmouth (28,689); North Middletown CDP (3,295); Oak Hill; Philips Mills; Port Monmouth CDP (3,745); Red Hill; River Plaza; Stone Church; Tiltons Corner; Town Brook
Millstone; Township	40	township	10,376	3,434	37.27	0.68	36.59	288.8	93.9	Upper Freehold Regional (9-12) (S/R); Millstone Township (PK-8)	Bairdsville; Bergen Mills; Carrs Corner; Carrs Tavern; Charleston Springs; Clarksburg; Ely; Elys Corner; Fair Play; Holmeson; Perrineville; Smithburg; Stone Tavern; Sweetman
Monmouth; Beach	17	borough	3,174	1,981	2.07	0.99	1.08	3,049.5	1,842.4	Shore Regional (9-12); Monmouth Beach (PK-8)	Galilee
Neptune City	9	borough	4,626	2,312	0.95	0.00	0.95	5,105.0	2,424.0	Neptune Township (9-12) (S/R); Neptune City (K-8)	
Neptune Township	45	township	28,061	12,991	8.67	0.49	8.18	3,414.3	1,587.8	Neptune Township	Bradley Park; Green Grove; Hamilton; Ocean Grove CDP (2,549); Shark River Hills CDP (3,583); West Grove
Ocean Township	46	township	27,672	11,541	11.00	0.12	10.88	2,509.1	1,061.1	Ocean Township	Cold Indian Springs; Deal Park; Elberon Park; Green Grove; Oakhurst CDP (4,069); Oakhurst Manor; Wanamassa CDP (4,344); Wayside; Wertheins Corner; West Allenhurst (1,934)
Oceanport	22	borough	6,150	2,390	3.80	0.62	3.18	1,833.7	751.5	Shore Regional (9-12); Oceanport (PK-8)	Port-au-peck; Sands Point
Red Bank	26	borough	12,936	5,381	2.16	0.42	1.74	7,019.1	3,094.4	Red Bank Regional (9-12); Red Bank (PK-8)	
Roosevelt	37	borough	808	327	1.92	0.01	1.91	461.8	171.2	East Windsor (7-12) (S/R); Roosevelt (PK-6)	
Rumson	19	borough	7,343	2,585	7.12	2.06	5.06	1,408.0	511.0	Rumson-Fair Haven (9-12); Rumson (PK-8)	Oceanic; Waterloo
Sea Bright	18	borough	1,449	1,211	1.29	0.56	0.73	1,935.5	1,659.9	Shore Regional (9-12); Oceanport (PK-8) (S/R)	Low Moor; Navesink Beach; Normandie
Sea Girt	3	borough	1,866	1,291	1.45	0.39	1.06	1,729.6	1,221.5	Manasquan (9-12) (S/R); Sea Girt (PK-8)	
Shrewsbury Borough	25	borough	3,809	1,310	2.20	0.03	2.17	1,757.2	604.4	Red Bank Regional (9-12); Shrewsbury (PK-8)	
Shrewsbury; Township	48	township	1,076	648	0.10	0.00	0.10	10,877.7	6,177.7	Monmouth Regional (9-12); Tinton Falls (K-8)	
Spring Lake	5	borough	2,789	2,048	1.73	0.40	1.33	2,250.8	1,540.2	Manasquan (9-12) (S/R); Spring Lake (PK-8)	North Spring Lake
Spring Lake; Heights	4	borough	4,890	2,972	1.31	0.03	1.28	3,671.3	2,315.1	Manasquan (9-12) (S/R); Spring Lake Heights (K-8)	Villa Park
Tinton Falls	27	borough	19,181	8,766	15.62	0.14	15.49	1,155.3	566.0	Monmouth Regional (9-12); Tinton Falls (K-8)	Green Grove; Hockhockson; Macedonia; Pine Brook; Reevytown; Wayside; West Shrewsbury; Wileys Corner
Union Beach	31	borough	5,723	2,269	1.89	0.09	1.80	3,461.5	1,257.7	Keyport (9-12) (S/R); Union Beach (PK-8)	Natco; Van Marters Corner
Upper Freehold	39	township	7,273	2,458	47.23	0.82	46.42	148.7	53.0	Upper Freehold Regional	Arneytown; Cooleys Corner; Cream Ridge CDP (630); Ellisdale; Emleys Hill; Homes Mills; Hornerstown; Imlaystown; Kirbys Mills; Nelsonville; New Canton; New Sharon; Polhemustown; Pullentown; Red Valley; Robinsville; Sharon; Shrewsbury; Spring Mill; Walnford; Wrightsville
Wall	44	township	26,525	10,883	31.74	1.06	30.67	853.0	354.8	Wall Township	Allaire; Allenwood CDP (954); Collingwood Park; Glendola; New Bedford; West Belmar CDP (2,459)
West Long; Branch	23	borough	8,587	2,528	2.89	0.04	2.86	2,832.9	884.5	Shore Regional (9-12); West Long Branch (K-8)	
Monmouth County	—	county	643,615	258,410	665.32	196.53	468.79	1,344.7	551.2		

== Services ==
=== Coroners and medical examiners ===
Jordan Woolley served as coroner c. 1880. John W. Flock Sr. was the coroner in 1902. The office of medical examiner was merged with Middlesex County, New Jersey in 2016. Diane Karluk is the medical examiner serving Mercer County, Middlesex County and Monmouth County.

=== Monmouth County SPCA ===
The Monmouth County Society for the Prevention of Cruelty to Animals is an animal welfare organization in Eatontown providing animal sheltering and cruelty investigation services to Monmouth County, New Jersey. It was founded in 1945 to care for the community's homeless, neglected, and abused animals. It is a government agency, not-for-profit 501(c)3 organization. The organization remains open-admission for communities it serves, taking owner surrenders by appointment and also offers animals for adoption. Many of the animals that are up for adoption come from all over the United States. Its Humane Law Enforcement Division investigates more than 900 animal cruelty complaints every year, and accepts anonymous calls. The SPCA also provides dog obedience training, a spay/neutering clinic, and pet bereavement counseling.

== Transportation ==
=== Roads and highways ===
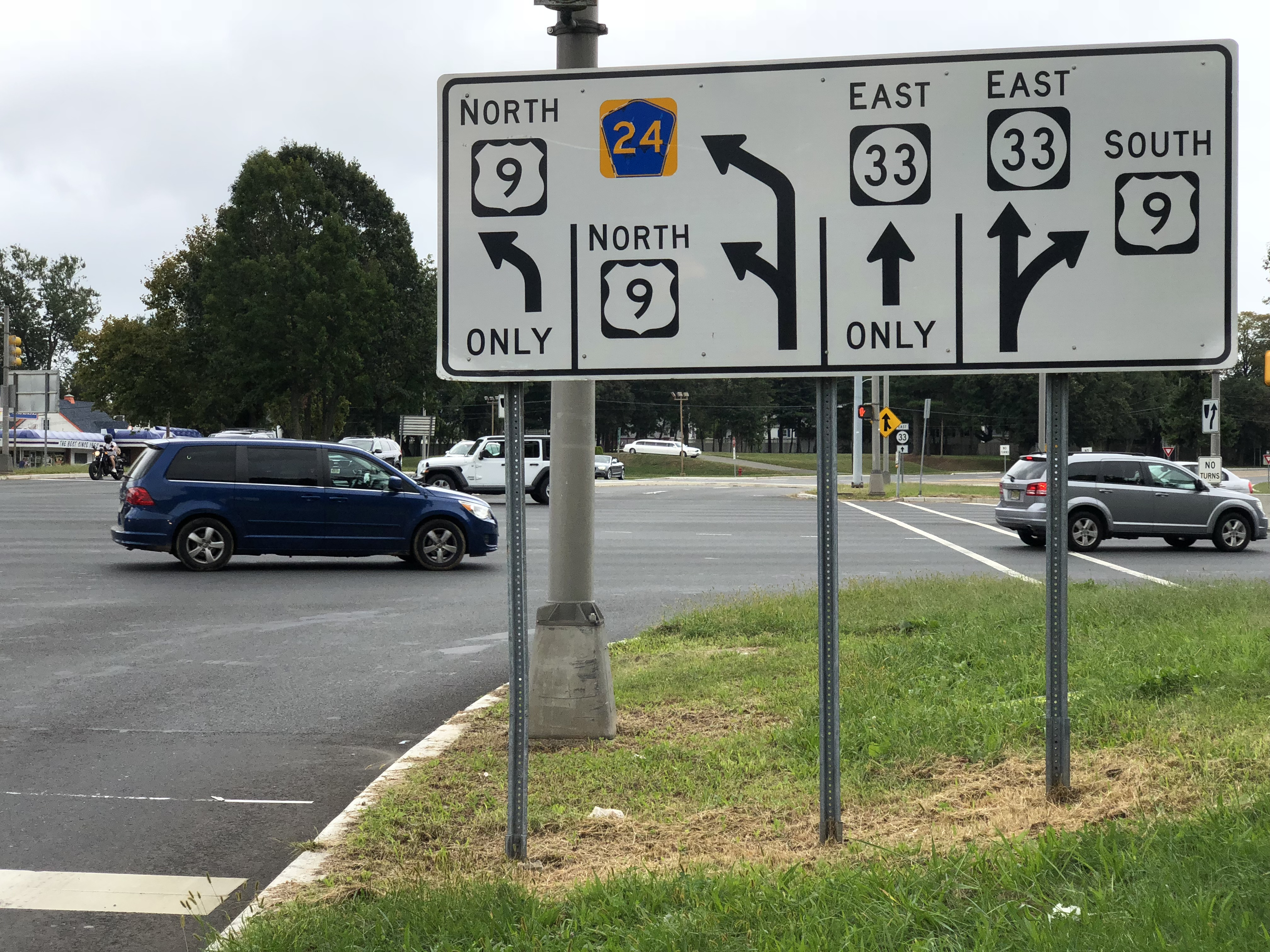
Route 33 Business approaching a major intersection with Route 9 and CR 24 (Manaplan Avenue) in Freehold Township

As of May 2010, the county had a total of 3,354.67 miles (5,398.82 km) of roadways, of which 2,762.31 miles (4,445.51 km) are maintained by the local municipality, 360.42 miles (580.04 km) by Monmouth County and 204.89 miles (329.74 km) by the New Jersey Department of Transportation and 27.05 miles (43.53 km) by the New Jersey Turnpike Authority.

Monmouth County is served by several major roadways including:

- US 9 (The only U.S. Highway in the county; practically bisects Monmouth, stretching through the county for more than 20 miles (32 km) from Lakewood in Ocean County in the south to Old Bridge Township in Middlesex County to the north.)
- Route 18
- Route 33
- Business Route 33
- Route 34
- Route 35
- Route 36
- Route 66
- Route 70
- Route 71
- Route 79
- Interstate 95 in New Jersey (Does not actually enter Monmouth County, however, exit 7A is just west of the county border near Upper Freehold Township, providing direct access to Interstate 195)
- Route 138
- Interstate 195 (Only interstate to pass through the county)
- The Garden State Parkway extends 26.5 miles (42.6 km) from Brick Township in Ocean County in the south to Old Bridge in Middlesex County to the north. The parkway's Judy Blume Service Area is located at milepost 100, between exits 98 and 100.

There are also many other major county routes passing through the county, including:

- CR 516, CR 516 Spur, CR 520, CR 522, CR 524, CR 524A, CR 524 Spur, CR 526, CR 526 Spur, CR 527, CR 527A, CR 537, CR 539, CR 547, CR 549, CR 571

=== Public transportation ===
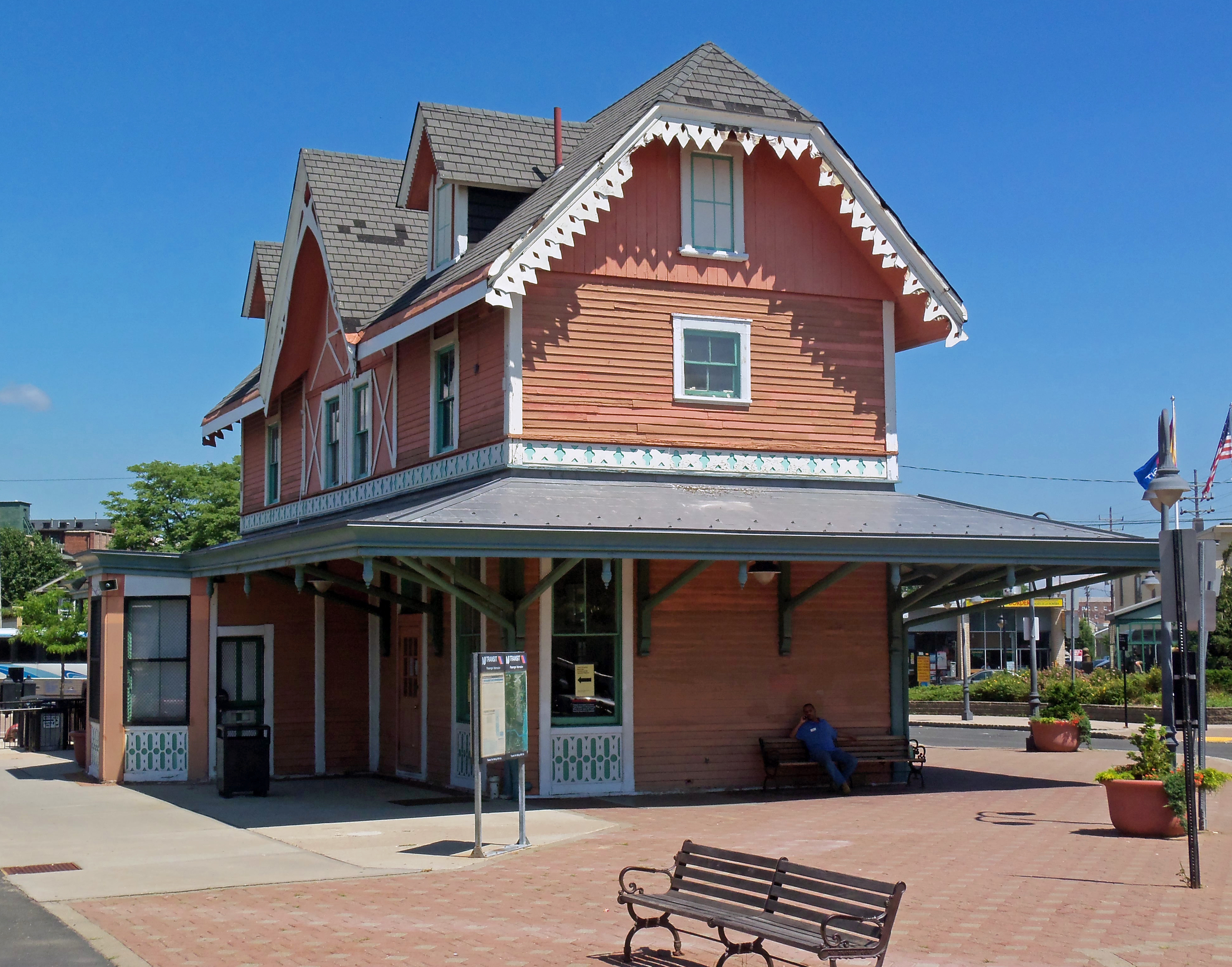
Red Bank Train Station

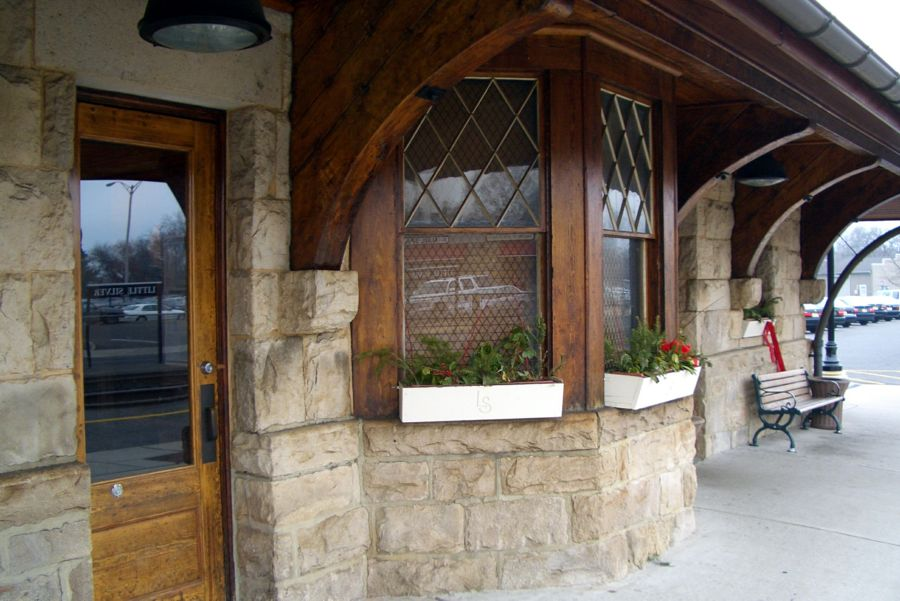
Little Silver Train Station

Numerous NJ Transit buses crisscross and deliver thousands of passengers each day to northern New Jersey and New York City's Port Authority Bus Terminal in Midtown Manhattan. Many more travel each day on NJ Transit's North Jersey Coast Line, which serves New York Penn Station in Midtown Manhattan and passes through Middlesex County, entering Monmouth County at Matawan, with 14 stations covering the length of the county, connecting the New York region to Jersey Shore communities.

== See also ==
- 2024 New Jersey drone sightings
- USS Monmouth County (LST-1032)
- Monmouth County Historical Association
- National Register of Historic Places listings in Monmouth County, New Jersey
- List of Monmouth County Board of County Commissioner Directors
