= Atlantic Highlands High School =

Defunct high school in New Jersey, US

- Monmouth County, New Jersey; United States

Information
- Closed: 1962
- Grades: 7-12

Atlantic Highlands High School was a comprehensive public high school and school district for students in seventh through twelfth grades from both Atlantic Highlands and Highlands in Monmouth County, New Jersey, United States, operating as part of the Atlantic Highlands School District. The school closed at the end of the 1961–62 school year, replaced by a new regional high school.

== History ==
The final high school facility was constructed in 1920 with a designed maximum of 450 students. By the time the new regional high school was set to open, the building was serving an enrollment of 800 students in kindergarten through twelfth grade. The 1962 graduating class was the 65th in school history.

The school closed in June 1962 and was replaced the next school year by Henry Hudson Regional High School, which also served students from Atlantic Highlands and Highlands.

== Notable alumni ==
- Joseph Azzolina (1926–2010), politician who served in the New Jersey Legislature for a total of 24 years, including 22 years in the New Jersey General Assembly and two years in the New Jersey Senate.
