= Henry Hudson Regional School District =

School district in Monmouth County, New Jersey, US

- 1 Grand Tour Highlands, Monmouth County, New Jersey, 07732

District information
- Grades: PreK-12
- Established: July 1, 2024
- Superintendent: Tara Beams
- Business administrator: Janet Sherlock
- Schools: 3

Students and staff
- Enrollment: 725 (as of 2024–25)
- Faculty: 86.7 FTEs
- Student–teacher ratio: 8.4:1

Other information
- District Factor Group: DE
- Website: www.tridistrict.org

Henry Hudson Regional School District is a comprehensive regional public school district for students in pre-kindergarten through twelfth grade from both Atlantic Highlands and Highlands in Monmouth County, in the U.S. state of New Jersey. The district came into existence as of July 1, 2024, through the consolidation of the formerly independent Atlantic Highlands School District and Highlands School District with Henry Hudson Regional High School into a single school district.

As of the 2024–25 school year, the district, comprised of three schools, had an enrollment of 725 students and 86.7 classroom teachers (on an FTE basis), for a student–teacher ratio of 8.4:1.

== History ==
Constructed at a cost of $1.3 million (equivalent to $13.8 million in 2025), Henry Hudson Regional School, the district's secondary school, opened on September 10, 1962, with a dedication ceremony conducted on November 5 of that year. The school opened with 630 students in grades 7-12, replacing the former Atlantic Highlands High School.

In September 2023, voters in both Atlantic Highlands and Highlands approved a ballot measure that would consolidate the two K–6 districts with the Henry Hudson regional district to form a single K–12 district starting in the 2024–25 school year. The consolidation was completed in July 2024. In 2024, a meeting between the three school district's boards of trustees stated that Sea Bright would have to re-establish its non-operating school district to join Henry Hudson, though there is no provision in New Jersey law to permit this. Students from Sea Bright attend the Oceanport School District for grades K–8 and Shore Regional High School for grades 9–12; both districts filed legal challenges opposing Sea Bright's efforts to end their sending relationship and join the consolidated K–12 Henry Hudson District.

== Schools ==
Schools in the district (with 2024–25 enrollment from the National Center for Educational Statistics) are:

- Atlantic Highlands Elementary School with 282 students in grades PreK–6
  - Michael Ferrarese, principal
- Highlands Elementary School with 153 students in grades PreK–6
  - Billy Jacoutot, principal
- Henry Hudson Regional School with 278 students in grades 7–12
  - Kevin McCarthy, principal

== Administration ==
Core members of the district's administration are:

- Tara Beams, superintendent
- Janet Sherlock, business administrator

Before the formation of the regional district, a joint Tri-District superintendent of schools had represented the Atlantic Highlands School District, the Highlands School District and the Henry Hudson Regional High School.

== Board of education ==
The district's board of education, comprised of nine members, sets policy and oversees the fiscal and educational operation of the district through its administration. As a Type II school district, the board's trustees are elected directly by voters to serve three-year terms of office on a staggered basis, with three seats up for election each year held (since 2012) as part of the November general election. The board appoints a superintendent to oversee the district's day-to-day operations and a business administrator to supervise the business functions of the district. Seats on the board are allocated based on the population of the constituent municipalities, with five seats assigned to Highlands and four to Atlantic Highlands.
