= John J. Flemm =

American businessman and politician (1896–1974)

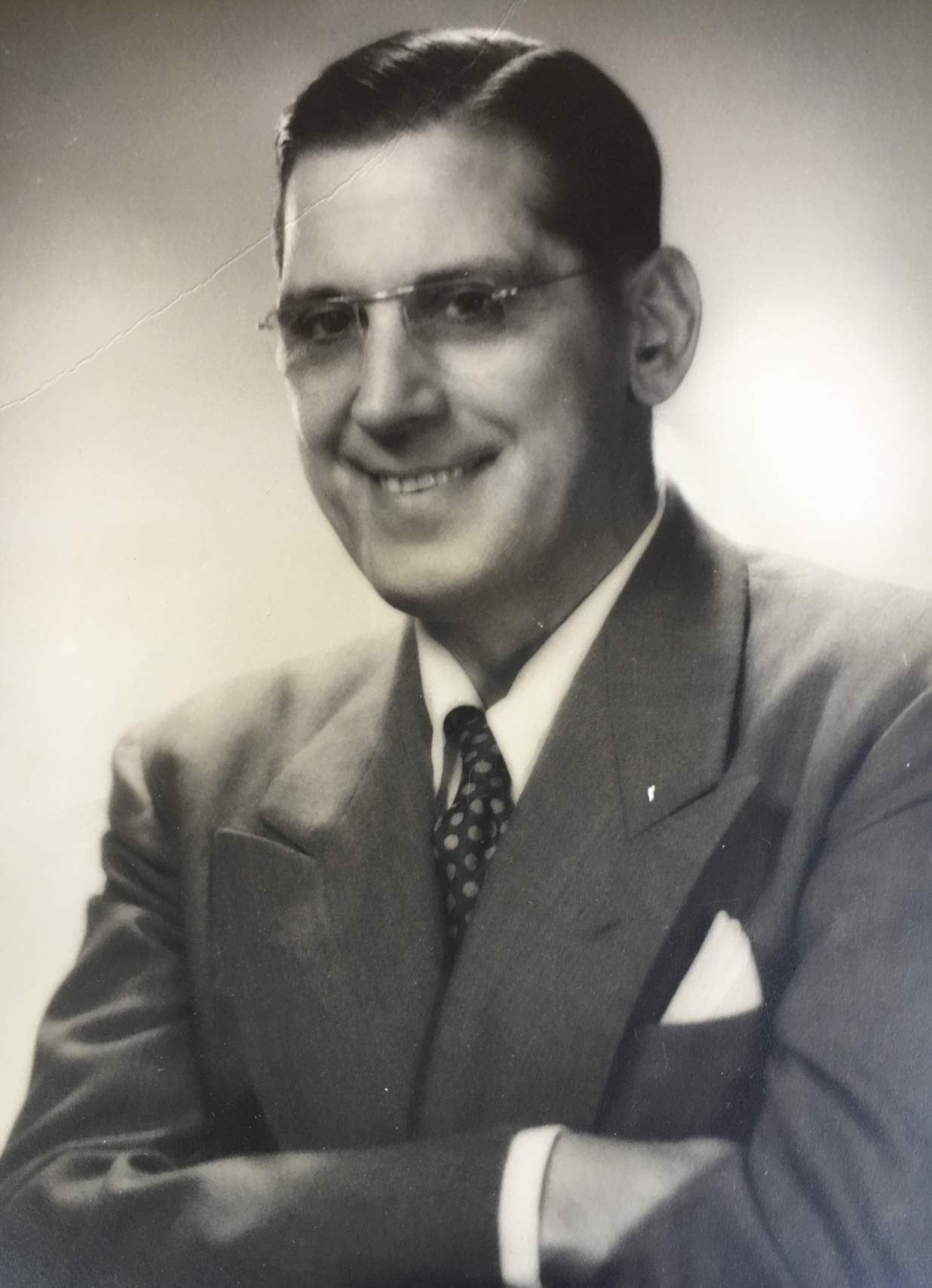
- Flemm in 1950

Member of the Highlands Borough Council
- In office January 1, 1950 – January 1, 1951
- Preceded by: Richard Parker
- Succeeded by: Matthew F. Horan

Personal details
- Born: John James Flemm; July 31, 1896 New York City, U.S.
- Died: March 13, 1974 (aged 77) Atlantic Highlands, New Jersey, U.S.
- Resting place: St. Michael's Cemetery
- Party: Democratic
- Spouse(s): Paulyne Colbert (divorced); Edith Dooley
- Children: 2
- Education: New York Institute of Technology
- Occupation: Businessman; politician; philanthropist; sailor
- Known for: Founding and leading the Flemm Lead Company

Military service
- Allegiance: United States
- Branch/service: United States Navy
- Years of service: 1913–1918
- Battles/wars: World War I; War at Sea

John James "Jack" Flemm (July 31, 1896 – March 13, 1974) was an American industrialist, politician, and Navy veteran who founded the Flemm Lead Company. A member of the Democratic Party, he served in local government in New Jersey and was a county party boss during the 1950s.

Born and raised in New York City, Flemm attended the New York Institute of Technology before enlisting in the U.S. Navy in 1913. After fighting the German Empire in the First World War, he returned to New York and began his career in the lead industry during the Roaring Twenties. In 1927, he established the Flemm Lead Company in Queens and expanded operations into Michigan and Puerto Rico, eventually becoming one of the largest lead manufacturers in the United States.

After becoming a multi-millionaire, Flemm served as a member of the Highlands, New Jersey Borough Council from 1950 to 1951 and was chair of the Monmouth County Democratic Party Executive Committee. During his political career, he espoused views generally associated with progressivism and socialism, supporting reformist policies to create public works jobs and expand access to affordable housing. After leaving politics, he returned to his company and became an active philanthropist, establishing the John J. Flemm Foundation before his death.

== Early life and military service ==
Flemm was born on July 31, 1896, in New York City, to Albert J. Flemm Jr. and Anna Carrie Flemm. He attended the New York Institute of Technology before enlisting in the Navy.

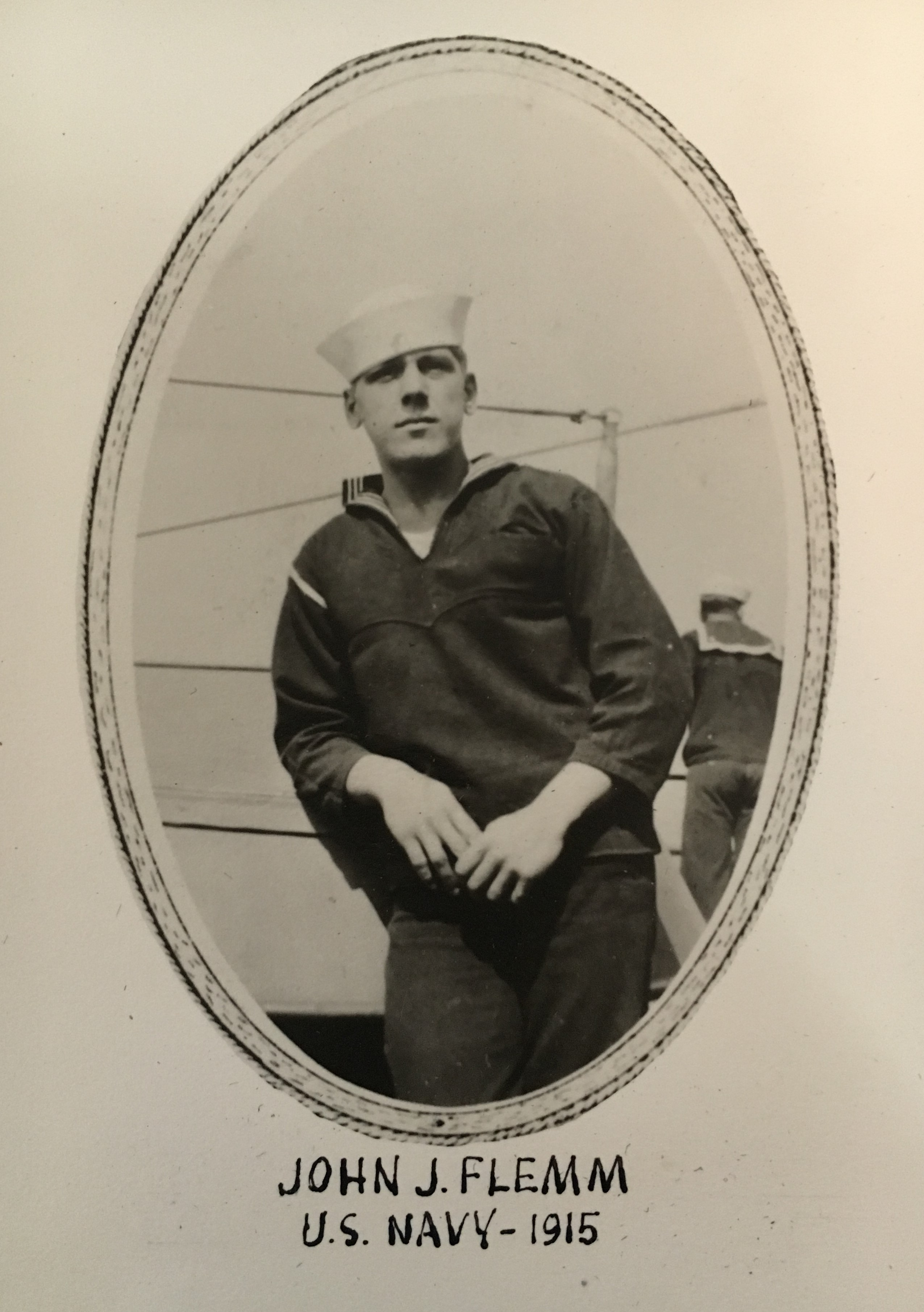
Flemm serving in the U.S. Navy, c. 1915

From 1913 to 1918, Flemm served in the United States Navy and fought the Central Powers in the War at Sea during World War I.

== Business career ==
In 1927, Flemm established the Flemm Lead Company in Long Island City and served as its president until his death. During the Great Depression, he acquired the Detroit Lead Pipe Works Company, which owned factories and mines in Southern Michigan and Puerto Rico. Flemm was a member of the Lead Industries Association and the Queens Chamber of Commerce.

In 1943, the Red Cross awarded Flemm the American Red Cross Award for contributions to the 1943 American Red Cross War Fund.

In 1948, Flemm designed and funded the construction of the Highlands Pier. It was built by the New York Corps of Army Engineers and extends a total of 132 feet (40 m) into the Shrewsbury River, 1/2 mile (0.80 km) south of Route 36 in Highlands.

In 1949, Flemm purchased $29,000 in bonds, unanimously approved by the borough council, to cover repairs to the Highlands public water system.

In 1952, Flemm invested in the Florida real estate industry, acquiring multiple properties in the Tampa Bay area.

=== John J. Flemm Foundation ===
In February 1974, Flemm founded the John J. Flemm Foundation, a grant-making non-profit organization based in Parsippany, New Jersey. The foundation has been a significant donor to the Museum of Modern Art and the Schwarzman Animal Medical Center.

== Political career ==
After declaring his candidacy for the Highlands Borough Council, Flemm won the Democratic primary election in April 1949. In November 1949, Flemm was elected to the borough council for a one-year unexpired term, in a gain for Democrats, becoming the only Democrat elected to the council that year. He was sworn into office on January 1, 1950, succeeding Republican Richard Parker. He was appointed to serve on the Police Committee (as chair), the Water and Sewer Committee and the Finance and Public Buildings Committee.

During his tenure, Flemm proposed the construction of a low-rent housing project near Huddy Park, built by borough employees. He also drafted and led the effort to pass new zoning laws, increasing regulation on the size of new homes built and dividing the borough into four districts: two residential, one business, and one business/industrial.

In 1950, Flemm was considered as a potential candidate for sheriff or freeholder of Monmouth County, but was persuaded to run for re-election by the local Democratic Party.

After winning the primary, Flemm was defeated for re-election in November 1950 by Republican Matthew F. Horan.

In March 1950, Flemm was appointed to the Highlands Public Housing Authority for a four-year term. In December 1951, he resigned from the board citing "business requirements".

In April 1950, Flemm was elected chair of the Monmouth County Democratic Party Committee, defeating incumbent chair James N. Kinlan. In accepting the position, Flemm named Michael S. Mendes as co-leader, due to "business obligations". He was the leader of the local political machine that controlled Middletown Township and Monmouth County until the late 1950s.

== Personal life and death ==
Flemm was married to Paulyne Colbert. They had two children: a daughter, Ruth, and a son, John Jr., who married Marion Gretsch, granddaughter of Friedrich Gretsch. Flemm and Paulyne divorced and he went on to marry Edith Dooley. Edith served as president of the local Ladies Democratic Social Club. Flemm was commonly known as "Jack" and later "John Sr." after the birth of his namesake. John Jr. served in the U.S. Navy during World War II and was wounded fighting in the Pacific theatre.

On March 13, 1974, Flemm died in Atlantic Highlands, New Jersey, at the age of 77. He was buried at St. Michael's Cemetery in East Elmhurst, Queens.
