= Highlands School District =

School district in Monmouth County, New Jersey, US

- Highlands Elementary School, the only school in the district at the time of its existence

Address
- 360 Navesink Avenue Highlands, Monmouth County, New Jersey, 07732; United States

District information
- Grades: PreK-6
- Closed: July 2024
- Superintendent: Tara Beams
- Business administrator: Christopher Mullins
- Schools: 1

Students and staff
- Enrollment: 169 (as of 2022–23)
- Faculty: 22.1 FTEs
- Student–teacher ratio: 7.6:1

Other information
- District Factor Group: CD
- Website: hes.tridistrict.org
Ind.	Per pupil	District spending	Rank (*)	K-6 average	%± vs. average
1A	Total Spending	$24,982	56	$18,891	32.2%
1	Budgetary Cost	20,162	55	13,649	47.7%
2	Classroom Instruction	10,912	54	8,366	30.4%
6	Support Services	5,472	58	2,161	153.2%
8	Administrative Cost	1,322	14	1,467	−9.9%
10	Operations & Maintenance	2,389	53	1,552	53.9%
13	Extracurricular Activities	65	31	39	66.7%
16	Median Teacher Salary	63,310	48	57,437
Data from NJDoE 2014 Taxpayers' Guide to Education Spending. *Of K-6 districts with any number of students. Lowest spending=1; Highest=59

The Highlands School District was a community public school district that serves students in pre-kindergarten through sixth grade in Highlands, in Monmouth County, in the U.S. state of New Jersey. The district was dissolved effective July 2024 with the merger of the Atlantic Highlands and Highlands districts into Henry Hudson Regional School District.

As of the 2022–23 school year, the district, comprised of one school, had an enrollment of 169 students and 22.1 classroom teachers (on an FTE basis), for a student–teacher ratio of 7.6:1. In the 2016–17 school year, Highlands was tied for the 40th-smallest enrollment of any school district in the state, with 190 students.

The district is classified by the New Jersey Department of Education as being in District Factor Group "CD", the sixth-highest of eight groupings. District Factor Groups organize districts statewide to allow comparison by common socioeconomic characteristics of the local districts. From lowest socioeconomic status to highest, the categories are A, B, CD, DE, FG, GH, I and J.

For seventh through twelfth grades, public school students attended Henry Hudson Regional High School, a comprehensive six-year high school and regional public school district that serves students from both Atlantic Highlands and Highlands. As of the 2022–23 school year, the high school had an enrollment of 296 students and 39.2 classroom teachers (on an FTE basis), for a student–teacher ratio of 7.6:1.

In September 2023, voters in both Atlantic Highlands and Highlands approved a ballot measure that would consolidate the two K–6 districts with the Henry Hudson regional district to form a single K–12 district starting in the 2024–25 school year.

== School ==
Highlands Elementary School had an enrollment of 170 students in the 2022–23 school year.

- William Jacoutot

== Administration ==
Core members of the district's administration were:

- Tara Beams, Tri-District Superintendent
- Christopher J. Mullins, business administrator and board secretary

The district had a shared Tri-District Superintendent of Schools for the Atlantic Highlands School District, the Highlands School District and the Henry Hudson Regional High School.

== Board of education ==
The district's board of education, comprised of seven members, set policy and oversees the fiscal and educational operation of the district through its administration. As a Type II school district, the board's trustees were elected directly by voters to serve three-year terms of office on a staggered basis, with either two or three seats up for election each year held (since 2012) as part of the November general election. The board appointed a superintendent to oversee the district's day-to-day operations and a business administrator to supervise the business functions of the district.
