= Henry Hudson Regional School =

High school in Monmouth County, New Jersey, US

Location
- 40.392394°N 73.985304°W

Information
- Type: Public high school
- School district: Henry Hudson Regional School District (2024-); Henry Hudson Regional High School District (-2024)
- NCES School ID: 348037006189
- Principal: Kevin McCarthy
- Faculty: 37.9 FTEs
- Grades: 7-12
- Enrollment: 278 (as of 2024–25)
- Student to teacher ratio: 7.3:1
- Colors: Navy Blue and white
- Athletics conference: Shore Conference
- Team name: Admirals
- Accreditation: Middle States Association of Colleges and Schools

Henry Hudson Regional School (commonly known as Henry Hudson Regional High School) is a comprehensive regional public secondary school (middle and high school) for students in 7th through 12th grade from both Atlantic Highlands and Highlands in Monmouth County, in the U.S. state of New Jersey. The school operates as part of the Henry Hudson Regional School District. The school has been accredited by the Middle States Association of Colleges and Schools Commission on Elementary and Secondary Schools through January 2031.

As of the 2024–25 school year, the school had an enrollment of 278 students and 37.9 classroom teachers (on an FTE basis), for a student–teacher ratio of 7.3:1. There were 70 students (25.2% of enrollment) eligible for free lunch and 12 (4.3% of students) eligible for reduced-cost lunch.

In September 2023, voters in both Atlantic Highlands and Highlands approved a ballot measure that would consolidate the two K–6 districts with the Henry Hudson regional district to form a single K–12 district starting in the 2024–25 school year.

== History ==
Constructed at a cost of $1.3 million (equivalent to $13.8 million in 2025), the school opened on September 10, 1962, with a dedication ceremony conducted on November 5 of that year. The school opened with 630 students in grades 7-12, replacing the former Atlantic Highlands High School.

The district's first superintendent was Henry Schiable, who served in the position until 1969.

In 2023 the voters of Atlantic Highlands School District and Highlands School District approved a proposal to consolidate into Henry Hudson, which would make it a PreK–12 school district. The consolidation is scheduled to be completed in July 2024. In 2024, a meeting between the three school district's boards of trustees stated that Sea Bright would have to re-establish its non-operating school district to join Henry Hudson, though there is no provision in New Jersey law to permit this. Students from Sea Bright attend the Oceanport School District for grades K-8 and Shore Regional High School for grades 9-12; both districts filed legal challenges opposing Sea Bright's efforts to end their sending relationship and join the consolidated K-12 Henry Hudson District.

The New Jersey Department of Education classifies the district in District Factor Group "DE", the fifth-highest of eight groupings. District Factor Groups organize districts statewide to allow comparison by socioeconomic characteristics. From lowest socioeconomic status to highest, the categories are A, B, CD, DE, FG, GH, I and J.

== Awards, recognition and rankings ==
The school was the 147th-ranked public high school in New Jersey out of 339 schools statewide in New Jersey Monthly magazine's September 2014 cover story on the state's "Top Public High Schools", using a new ranking methodology. The school had been ranked 101st in the state of 328 schools in 2012, after being ranked 121st in 2010 out of 322 schools listed. The magazine ranked the school 176th in 2008 out of 316 schools. The school was ranked 159th in the magazine's September 2006 issue, which surveyed 316 schools across the state. Schooldigger.com ranked the school tied for 190th out of 381 public high schools statewide in its 2011 rankings (a decrease of 1 positions from the 2010 ranking) which were based on the combined percentage of students classified as proficient or above proficient on the two components of the High School Proficiency Assessment (HSPA), mathematics (80.0%) and language arts literacy (91.6%).

== Athletics ==
The Henry Hudson Regional High School Admirals compete in Division B Central of the Shore Conference, an athletic conference comprised of public and private high schools in Monmouth and Ocean counties along the Jersey Shore. The conference operates under the jurisdiction of the New Jersey State Interscholastic Athletic Association (NJSIAA). With 150 students in grades 10-12, the school was classified by the NJSIAA for the 2019–20 school year as Group I for most athletic competition purposes, which included schools with an enrollment of 75 to 476 students in that grade range. The school's co-op team with Keyport High School was classified by the NJSIAA as Group I South for football for 2024–2026, which included schools with 185 to 482 students.

The school participates as the host school / lead agency for joint cooperative cross country running, boys / girls tennis and winter track teams with Keyport High School, while Keyport is the host school for girls soccer, boys / girls volleyball and wrestling teams. These co-op programs operate under agreements scheduled to expire at the end of the 2023–24 school year.

The softball team made it to the Group I state championship game in 2015, losing to Cedar Grove High School in the tournament finals.

== Administration ==
The school's principal is Kevin McCarthy, principal.

== Notable alumni ==
- Jeff Anderson (born 1970), actor best known for being featured in Clerks and Clerks 2 as Randal Graves.
- Walt Flanagan (born 1967), co-host of Tell 'Em Steve-Dave!, manager of Jay and Silent Bob's Secret Stash, and star of Comic Book Men.
- Jeffrey Gluckstein (born 1993), individual and synchronized trampolinist who has represented the U.S. at international competitions.
- Steven Gluckstein (born 1990), trampoline athlete.
- Bryan Johnson (born 1967), co-host of the Tell Em' Steve-Dave! and star of Comic Book Men.
- Jason Mewes (born 1974), actor best known for playing the role of foul-mouthed drug dealer "Jay", the vocal half of Jay and Silent Bob.
- Kevin Smith (born 1970), screenwriter and film director, who is the silent half of Jay and Silent Bob.
- Jerry Vasto (born 1992), MLB pitcher for the Colorado Rockies.
