= Highlands, New Jersey =

Borough in Monmouth County, New Jersey, US

- Borough
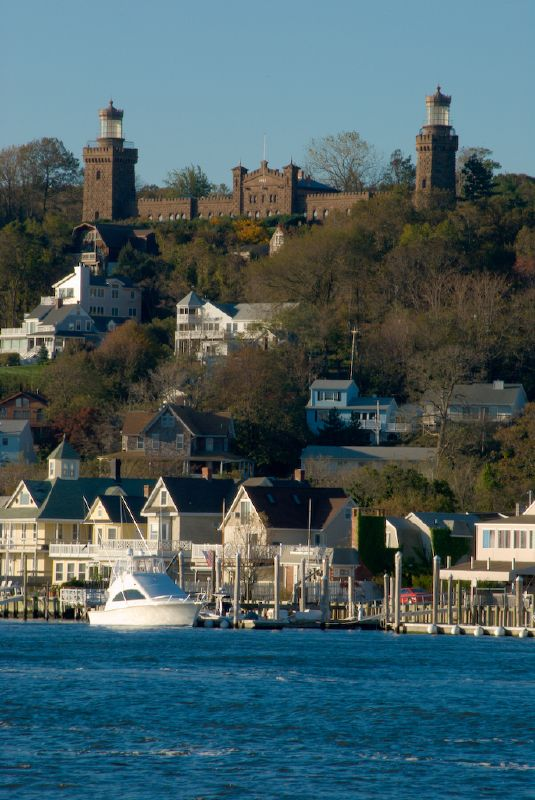
- The eastern shore of Highlands borough, topped on a bluff by the Twin Lights of the Navesink

- Seal

- Location of Highlands in Monmouth County highlighted in red (left). Inset map: Location of Monmouth County in New Jersey highlighted in orange (right).

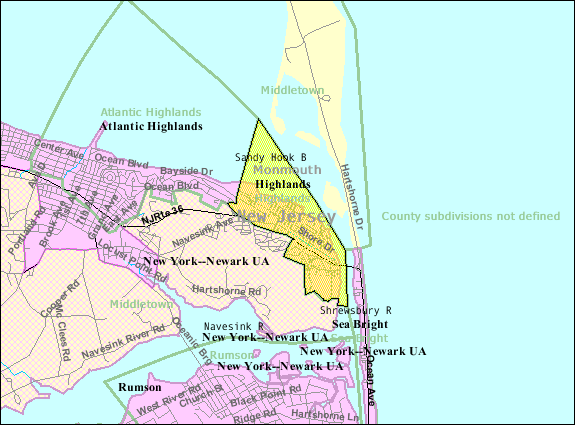
- Census Bureau map of Highlands, New Jersey
- Interactive map of Highlands, New Jersey
- Location in Monmouth County Location in New Jersey Location in the United States
- Coordinates: 40.404229°N 73.988186°W
- Country: United States
- State: New Jersey
- County: Monmouth
- Incorporated: March 22, 1900

Government
  - Type: Faulkner Act (small municipality)
  - Body: Borough Council
  - Mayor: Carolyn Broullon (term ends December 31, 2028)
  - Administrator: Michael Muscillo
  - Municipal clerk: Nancy Tran

Area
  - Total: 1.39 sq mi (3.59 km^{2})
  - Land: 0.74 sq mi (1.92 km^{2})
  - Water: 0.64 sq mi (1.67 km^{2}) 46.47%
  - Rank: 462nd of 565 in state 39th of 53 in county
- Elevation: 13 ft (4.0 m)

Population (2020)
  - Total: 4,621
  - Estimate (2023): 4,329
  - Rank: 392nd of 565 in state 35th of 53 in county
  - Density: 6,244.6/sq mi (2,411.1/km^{2})
  - Rank: 85th of 565 in state 8th of 53 in county
- Time zone: UTC−05:00 (Eastern (EST))
  - Summer (DST): UTC−04:00 (Eastern (EDT))
- ZIP Code: 07732
- Area code: 732 exchanges: 291, 708, 872
- FIPS code: 3402531500
- GNIS feature ID: 0885253
- Website: highlandsnj.gov

See also New York–New Jersey Highlands for the northwestern part of New Jersey.

Highlands is a borough in northern Monmouth County, in the U.S. state of New Jersey. A historic waterfront community located on the Raritan Bay within the Raritan Valley region, this scenic borough is a commuter town of New York City in the New York metropolitan area. As of the 2020 United States census, the borough's population was 4,621, a decrease of 384 (−7.7%) from the 2010 census count of 5,005, which in turn reflected a decline of 92 (−1.8%) from the 5,097 counted in the 2000 census. The eastern part of the town is on a high bluff that overlooks Sandy Hook and Sandy Hook Bay, the entrance to New York Harbor, and the Atlantic Ocean, from which the borough derives its name. Atop this bluff are the Navesink Twin Lights.

Highlands was incorporated as a borough by an act of the New Jersey Legislature on March 22, 1900, from parts of Middletown Township. Additional parts of Middletown Township were annexed in 1914.

Highlands was part of the Bayshore Regional Strategic Plan, an effort by nine municipalities in northern Monmouth County to reinvigorate the area's economy by emphasizing the traditional downtowns, residential neighborhoods, maritime history, and the natural environment of the Raritan Bayshore coastline. The plan has since been integrated into the 2016 Monmouth County Master Plan.

On October 29, 2012, Hurricane Sandy struck the eastern seaboard of the United States, making landfall just north of Atlantic City, before causing significant damage to businesses and homes in the borough.

== History ==
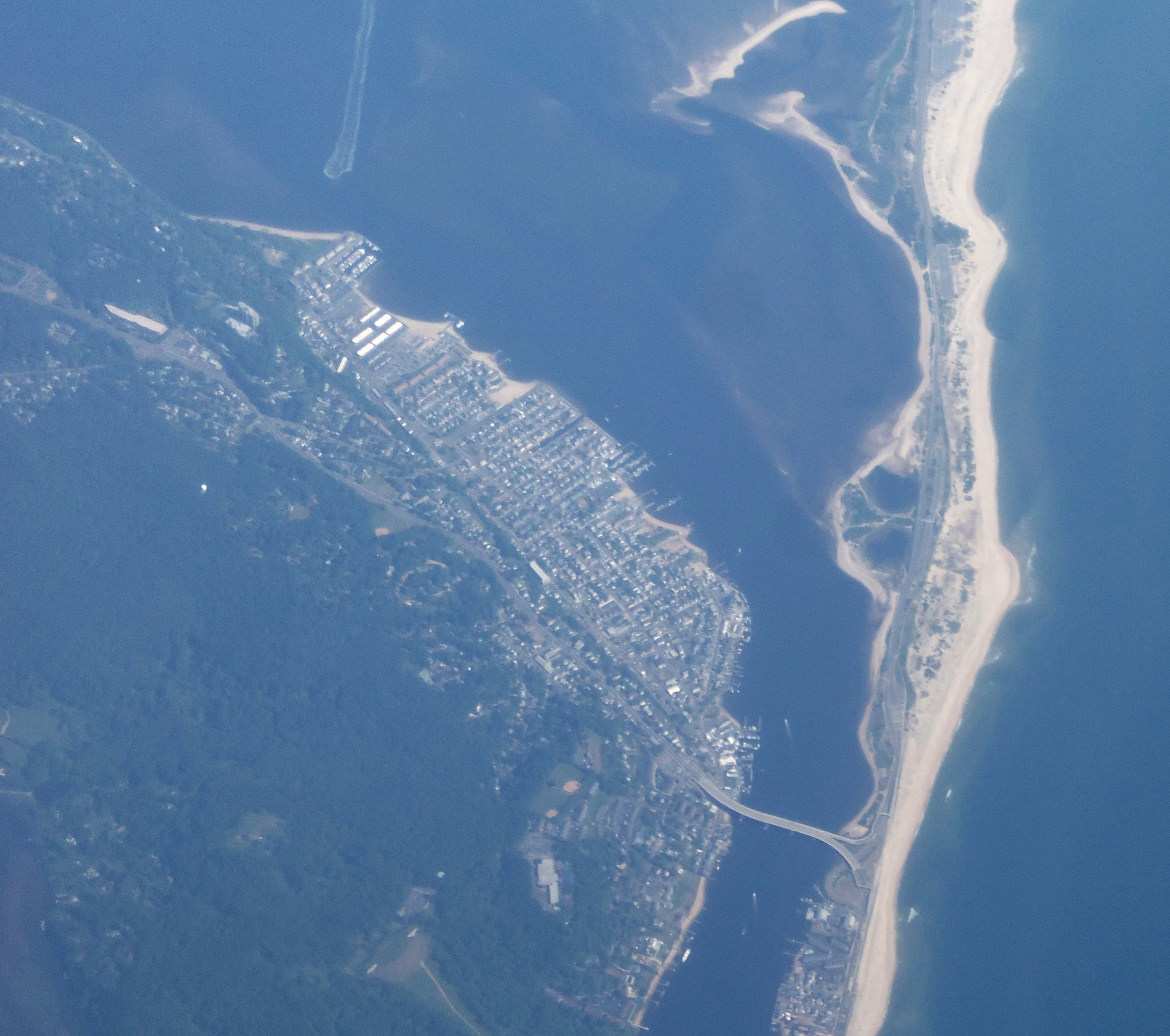
Highlands, New Jersey, with part of Sandy Hook at right

Giovanni da Verrazzano explored the area known today as Highlands in 1525. During the next two centuries, the Highlands area would welcome English and Dutch settlers. Even by the 20th Century, many immigrants saw the hills of the Highlands of Navesink which were almost 300 feet (91 m) above sea level.

The oldest route to the eastern coast of the United States is the Minisink Trail which started on the upper Delaware River, came through northern New Jersey and ended at the Navesink River. Navesink means "good fishing spot" in the native tongue at the time. The trail was used by Native Americans, such as the Algonquin and Lenni Lenape tribes. They came from all over New Jersey to spend the summer fishing and finding clams. The Newasunks, Raritans, and Sachem Papomorga (or Lenni Lenape) were the most prevalent tribes and stayed the longest. These were the tribes which mostly traded with early settlers.

One year after Verrazzano explored the area, Portuguese explorer Estêvão Gomes (also spelled as Estevan Gomez) visited the Highlands of Navesink and created the first maps of the area. These were the maps in which Sandy Hook was first drawn and called "Cabo de Arenas" or "Cape of Sands."

In 1609, Henry Hudson sailed into the Sandy Hook Bay and wrote: "This is very good land to fall in with and a pleasant land to see. Our men went on land, so they went up into the woods and saw great stores of very goodly oaks and some currants". One of Hudson's crew became the first man killed by Native Americans who were frightened by his scouting party.

Many years after Hudson's trip to the area, the Highlands of Navesink saw a number of Dutch who traded with the Navesink Indians and prepared nautical charts. William Reape, one of the Dutch, made a bargain with the local natives to trade land in exchange for rum, blankets and gunpowder.

Eventually, the Dutch settlers named the land "Rensselaer's Hoeck," but British settlers took over and renamed the settlement "Portland" in 1664. The group purchasing the land included James Hubbard, John Bawne, John Tilton Jr., Richard Stout, William Goulding and Samuel Spear.

Three years later, in 1677, Richard Hartshorne purchased a 2,320-acre (940 ha) tract of land from the Native Americans which provided him with control of nearly all of Sandy Hook and Highlands which was then called "Portland Poynt." Hartshorne and his family became the first permanent settlers of the area.

Some early settlers soon realized the importance Highlands and Sandy Hook would have in the defense of the country. People in Highlands and Sandy Hook could warn New York of any enemies approaching by sea and also to help guide ships into New York Harbor. In 1762, New York merchants purchased a 4-acre (1.6 ha) site from the Hartshorne family for a light house. Two years later, the Sandy Hook Light House was lighted for the first time.

The hills of the Highlands of Navesink and Sandy Hook also played an important role during the American Revolutionary War. It was a vital strategic site for the British and Colonial Armies. When the British fleet arrived close to Sandy Hook in 1776, sympathizers with the British built fortifications and with the help of the British were able to hold Sandy Hook for the remainder of the Revolutionary War. The Loyalists stayed in control of Sandy Hook even after the war was ended by the surrender of Cornwallis at Yorktown on October 19, 1781.

Captain Joshua Huddy was the eldest of seven brothers and a member of the Monmouth Continental Militia. He pursued gangs of Tory (Loyalist) refugees who plundered the area searching for American rebels. The refugees made Huddy a target and tried to kill him several times. Unfortunately, one of the Loyalists' raids from Sandy Hook ended with setting Huddy's house on fire. Huddy agreed to surrender if they would help him to put out the fire. They agreed and took Huddy as a prisoner. The fire from the house had attracted the attention of Huddy's neighbors and the local militia raced after the Tories, catching them before they could reach their boats at Black Point in Rumson. In the fight that ensued, Huddy escaped.

However, two years later the Loyalists captured Huddy and brought him to Gravelly Point in Highlands where he was allowed to write his will. Then Huddy was hanged for the death of Captain Philip White who had been captured by Rebels earlier in Long Branch and shot while being transported to Freehold. Huddy was not involved in the shooting, as he was in a British prison at the time, but was hanged anyway. His body was carried by patriots to Freehold and buried. Today, a monument in Huddy Park honors Captain Joshua Huddy.

In 1796, the first hotel in the Highlands of Navesink was built and many other hotels were built until the War of 1812. Two years later, the tourism began to grow and new hotels were built on Sandy Hook and on the hills of Highlands. In addition, a number of new homes were being built and visitors were coming to Highlands by the boatload.

Author James Fenimore Cooper, author of Last of the Mohicans, also wrote Water Witch, a novel which was inspired by his visits to Highlands. Walt Whitman, one of America's most famous poets, celebrated his excursions to Highlands in his journals and a group of his poems entitled, "Fancies at Navesink."

By 1880, numerous hotels, beach pavilions and private clubs were flourishing in Highlands. It was the beginning of a glorious era for the small town on the Shrewsbury River. Trains and steamships brought vacationers to celebrate post-Civil War prosperity.

New York theatrical producers and famous actors built summer homes in Highlands. The area became so popular that Harper's Magazine sent a journalist down nearly every summer in the 1870s and 1880s to write about the community and its people.

The Seashore Railroad had been built on the Sandy Hook peninsula during 1865 and a ferry service was established to take passengers across the river from Highlands to his hotel on Sandy Hook. Then a bridge was constructed in 1872 and the ferry service ceased operations. The new drawbridge was about 1,500 feet (460 m) and 18 feet (5.5 m) wide. It was constructed at a cost of $35,000 and opened in 1872, but was closed for three years when a schooner ran into it in 1875. By 1883, a railroad came to Atlantic Highlands and in 1892 the old draw bridge at Highlands was torn down and a new railroad bridge was built by the New Jersey Central Railroad Company for their coastal line. This new bridge for rail, vehicular, and foot traffic was opened in 1892.

On Lighthouse Hill were the Twin Lights which is one of the most historic sites in the nation. Built in 1862, it was the first twin light house, the first electric powered light, the first glimpse of America for incoming ships, the first in the nation to use the Fresnel lens, the first to use wireless telegraphy, and the site of the first experiments with radar.

Light House Hill (also known as Beacon Hill) was employed as a site for a beacon as early as 1746, when England was in conflict with France in the War of Austrian Succession, and the colonies of both were up for grabs. The beacon—whale oil burned in pots—was not only to welcome sailors, but to warn citizens that the French were coming up the harbor and it was time to take down the musket from over the fireplace. During the Revolutionary War, the beacon served the same purpose, only Britain was the enemy.

In 1899, Guglielmo Marconi, the inventor of wireless telegraphy demonstrated his invention at the Twin Lights so the New York Herald could be the first to have news of the 1899 America's Cup races to be run off the New Jersey Coast.

By the 1920s, Highlands was a popular tourist destination. By 1932, however, century-long steamboat operations on the Shrewsbury and Navesink Rivers came quickly to an end.

Before World War II, the northern tower was the first place where experiments with radar were held. So successful were the tests that, soon after the war, radar was the major tool of navigation and the government decided to decommission the Twin Lights and abandon the building as an operative light house.

During 1900, Highlands was incorporated and passed an ordinance prohibiting horses, cows and pigs from running loose on the streets. It also ordered that three-inch hemlock and chestnut planking be used as curbs along the officially designated streets.

By 1920 the "manufacture, sale or transportation of intoxicating liquors" was prohibited. However, "rum-running" was a common practice for New Jersey's beachfront and Highlands became the main port for the infamous trade. Highlands also had great boat-building facilities which could produce boats faster than the authorities could catch. The Jersey Skiff, designed and built in Highlands, became the primary craft to be used in the smuggling operations.

Highlands became known for sport fishing in the 1920s. Today, countless boats can be seen in the rivers, bays and ocean to catch fluke, bluefish, striped bass or whiting.

Clamming was an important activity here for the Native Americans and the first settlers learned from them. A writer in 1890 reported that clams were to Parkertown what the whale once was to Nantucket.

Gertrude Ederle spent all of her summers in Highlands and learned to swim at the beach on Miller Street. She would swim from Sandy Hook to the Highlands Bridge in two hours and forty minutes to train for her famous English Channel swim in 1926. She became the first woman to swim the English Channel, and also the first to be given a ticker-tape parade on Broadway. Ederle attended the 1975 dedication of a park in Highlands named in her honor.

During 1975, all military installations on Sandy Hook (except for the U.S. Coast Guard) were decommissioned and the land was given to the National Park Service to become the Gateway National Recreation Area.

In 2012, during Hurricane Sandy, the borough was heavily damaged when a storm surge of nearly 10 feet (3.0 m) swept in from the bay beginning October 28. Most homes and businesses, including the Bahrs Landing and Lusty Lobster fishery were either damaged or totally destroyed. With 80% of homes and most businesses severely damaged by the storm, considerations were made for a $25 million project to raise the borough by about 10 feet (3.0 m) as a long-term solution to flooding.

== Geography ==
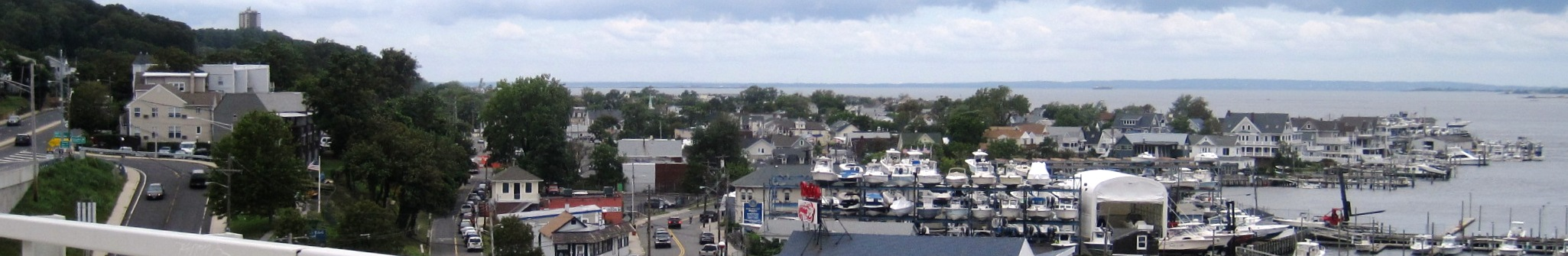
Downtown Highlands as seen from the Route 36 bridge

According to the United States Census Bureau, the borough had a total area of 1.39 square miles (3.59 km^{2}), including 0.74 square miles (1.92 km^{2}) of land and 0.65 square miles (1.67 km^{2}) of water (46.47%).

Unincorporated communities, localities and place names located partially or completely within the borough include Parkertown and Waterwitch (also spelled as "Water Witch").

The borough borders the Monmouth County municipalities of Atlantic Highlands, Middletown Township and Sea Bright.

=== Climate ===
The climate in this area is characterized by hot, humid summers and generally mild to cool winters. According to the Köppen Climate Classification system, Highlands has a humid subtropical climate, abbreviated "Cfa" on climate maps.

== Demographics ==
Historical population
Census	Pop.	Note	%±
1900	1,228		—
1910	1,386		12.9%
1920	1,731		24.9%
1930	1,877		8.4%
1940	2,076		10.6%
1950	2,959		42.5%
1960	3,536		19.5%
1970	3,916		10.7%
1980	5,187		32.5%
1990	4,849		−6.5%
2000	5,097		5.1%
2010	5,005		−1.8%
2020	4,621		−7.7%
2023 (est.)	4,329	▼	−6.3%
Population sources: 1900–1920 1900–1910; 1910–1930 1940–2000; 2000 2010 2020

=== 2020 census ===
As of the 2020 census, Highlands had a population of 4,621. The median age was 49.3 years. 11.8% of residents were under the age of 18 and 19.3% of residents were 65 years of age or older. For every 100 females there were 98.8 males, and for every 100 females age 18 and over there were 98.6 males age 18 and over.

100.0% of residents lived in urban areas, while 0.0% lived in rural areas.

There were 2,425 households in Highlands, of which 14.0% had children under the age of 18 living in them. Of all households, 30.8% were married-couple households, 27.8% were households with a male householder and no spouse or partner present, and 32.4% were households with a female householder and no spouse or partner present. About 44.6% of all households were made up of individuals and 13.8% had someone living alone who was 65 years of age or older.

There were 2,931 housing units, of which 17.3% were vacant. The homeowner vacancy rate was 1.6% and the rental vacancy rate was 6.8%.

Racial composition as of the 2020 census
Race	Number	Percent
White	4,007	86.7%
Black or African American	88	1.9%
American Indian and Alaska Native	3	0.1%
Asian	56	1.2%
Native Hawaiian and Other Pacific Islander	0	0.0%
Some other race	139	3.0%
Two or more races	328	7.1%
Hispanic or Latino (of any race)	343	7.4%

=== 2010 census ===
The 2010 United States census counted 5,005 people, 2,623 households, and 1,159 families in the borough. The population density was 6,522.8 per square mile (2,518.5/km^{2}). There were 3,146 housing units at an average density of 4,100.1 per square mile (1,583.1/km^{2}). The racial makeup was 92.97% (4,653) White, 1.62% (81) Black or African American, 0.28% (14) Native American, 1.30% (65) Asian, 0.00% (0) Pacific Islander, 1.94% (97) from other races, and 1.90% (95) from two or more races. Hispanic or Latino of any race were 6.47% (324) of the population.

Of the 2,623 households, 15.5% had children under the age of 18; 31.3% were married couples living together; 8.5% had a female householder with no husband present and 55.8% were non-families. Of all households, 45.3% were made up of individuals and 10.9% had someone living alone who was 65 years of age or older. The average household size was 1.91 and the average family size was 2.70.

14.2% of the population were under the age of 18, 6.6% from 18 to 24, 29.0% from 25 to 44, 37.3% from 45 to 64, and 12.9% who were 65 years of age or older. The median age was 45.1 years. For every 100 females, the population had 101.6 males. For every 100 females ages 18 and older there were 100.6 males.

The Census Bureau's 2006–2010 American Community Survey showed that (in 2010 inflation-adjusted dollars) median household income was $75,291 (with a margin of error of +/− $12,503) and the median family income was $80,430 (+/− $7,353). Males had a median income of $63,686 (+/− $6,479) versus $46,641 (+/− $9,013) for females. The per capita income for the borough was $42,737 (+/− $4,647). About 11.5% of families and 12.3% of the population were below the poverty line, including 30.3% of those under age 18 and 1.9% of those age 65 or over.

=== 2000 census ===
As of the 2000 United States census there were 5,097 people, 2,450 households, and 1,193 families residing in the borough. The population density was 6,689.2 inhabitants per square mile (2,582.7/km^{2}). There were 2,820 housing units at an average density of 3,700.9 per square mile (1,428.9/km^{2}). The racial makeup of the borough was 95.10% White, 1.59% African American, 0.33% Native American, 1.00% Asian, 0.59% from other races, and 1.39% from two or more races. Hispanic or Latino of any race were 4.06% of the population.

There were 2,450 households, out of which 19.9% had children under the age of 18 living with them, 34.4% were married couples living together, 10.5% had a female householder with no husband present, and 51.3% were non-families. 41.7% of all households were made up of individuals, and 9.0% had someone living alone who was 65 years of age or older. The average household size was 2.08 and the average family size was 2.90.

In the borough the population was spread out, with 18.8% under the age of 18, 7.3% from 18 to 24, 36.8% from 25 to 44, 25.8% from 45 to 64, and 11.3% who were 65 years of age or older. The median age was 39 years. For every 100 females, there were 100.4 males. For every 100 females age 18 and over, there were 98.0 males.

The median income for a household in the borough was $45,692, and the median income for a family was $50,985. Males had a median income of $50,296 versus $31,265 for females. The per capita income for the borough was $29,369. About 11.5% of families and 12.3% of the population were below the poverty line, including 20.0% of those under age 18 and 11.7% of those age 65 or over.

== Government ==
=== Local government ===
Highlands is governed by a Faulkner Act, formally known as the Optional Municipal Charter Law, under the Small Municipality (Plan C) form of New Jersey municipal government, enacted by direct petition as of January 1, 1978. The borough is one of 18 municipalities (of the 564) statewide that use this form of government, which is only available to municipalities with a population below 12,000 at the time of adoption. The governing body is comprised of the mayor and the four-member borough council, who are elected on an at-large basis in non-partisan voting to three-year terms on a staggered basis as part of the November general election, in a three-year cycle in which two council seats come up for election in each of two consecutive years followed by the mayoral seat up for vote in the third year. This form of government was adopted in 1956. In a 2014 referendum, voters changed the format and timing of elections from partisan in November to nonpartisan in May. In the November 2014 general election, voters approved a referendum shifting the borough's nonpartisan elections from May to November, with the first November nonpartisan municipal election taking place in 2015.

As of 2025, the mayor of the Borough of Highlands is Carolyn Broullon, whose term of office ends December 31, 2025. Members of the Highlands Borough Council are Council President JoAnne Provenzano Olszewski (2026), Leo Cervantes (2027), Karen Chelak (2027) and Donald Melnyk (2026).

=== Federal, state and county representation ===
Highlands is in the 6th Congressional District and is part of New Jersey's 13th state legislative district.

For the 119th United States Congress, New Jersey's 6th congressional district is represented by Frank Pallone (D, Long Branch). New Jersey is represented in the United States Senate by Democrats Cory Booker (Newark, term ends 2027) and Andy Kim (Moorestown, term ends 2031).

For the 2026–2027 session, the 13th legislative district of the New Jersey Legislature is represented in the New Jersey Senate by Declan O'Scanlon (R, Little Silver) and in the General Assembly by Vicky Flynn (R, Holmdel Township) and Gerard Scharfenberger (R, Middletown Township).

Monmouth County is governed by a Board of County Commissioners composed of five members who are elected at-large to serve three-year terms of office on a staggered basis, with either one or two seats up for election each year as part of the November general election. At an annual reorganization meeting held in the beginning of January, the board selects one of its members to serve as director and another as deputy director.

As of 2026, Monmouth County's Commissioners are Director Thomas A. Arnone (R, Neptune City, 2028),Deputy Director Nick DiRocco (R, Wall Township, 2028), Susan M. Kiley (R, Hazlet Township, 2027), Erik Anderson (R, Shrewsbury, 2026), and Ross F. Licitra (R, Marlboro Township, 2026).

Constitutional officers elected on a countywide basis are Clerk Christine Giordano Hanlon (R, 2030; Ocean Township), Sheriff Shaun Golden (R, 2028; Howell Township) and Surrogate Maureen Raisch (R, 2026; Middletown Township).

=== Politics ===
United States presidential election results for Highlands
Year	Republican		Democratic		Third party(ies)	
Year	No.	%	No.	%	No.	%
2024	1,379	50.26%	1,320	48.10%	45	1.64%
2020	1,387	48.51%	1,429	49.98%	43	1.50%
2016	1,172	52.11%	983	43.71%	94	4.18%
2012	837	43.78%	1,044	54.60%	31	1.62%
2008	1,108	45.86%	1,266	52.40%	42	1.74%
2004	1,230	50.85%	1,164	48.12%	25	1.03%
2000	878	40.40%	1,177	54.16%	118	5.43%
1996	629	31.02%	1,108	54.64%	291	14.35%
1992	832	36.78%	939	41.51%	491	21.71%

As of March 23, 2011, there were 3,118 registered voters in Highlands, of whom 880 (28.2%) were registered Democrats, 728 (23.3%) registered Republicans and 1,509 (48.4%) unaffiliated. One voter was registered to another party.

In the 2012 presidential election, Democrat Barack Obama received 54.6% of the vote (1,044), ahead of Republican Mitt Romney with 43.8% (837), and other candidates with 1.6% (31), with 1,930 ballots cast by the borough's 3,294 registered voters (18 ballots were spoiled), for a turnout of 58.6%. In the 2008 presidential election, Obama received 51.3% of the vote (1,266), ahead of Republican John McCain with 44.9% (1,108) and other candidates with 1.7% (42), with 2,467 ballots cast by the borough's 3,451 registered voters, for a turnout of 71.5%. In the 2004 presidential election, Republican George W. Bush received 50.6% of the vote (1,230), outpolling Democrat John Kerry with 47.9% (1,164) and other candidates with 0.7% (25 votes), with 2,429 ballots cast by the borough's 3,431 registered voters, for a turnout of 70.8%.

Gubernatorial election results for Highlands
Year	Republican		Democratic		Third party(ies)	
Year	No.	%	No.	%	No.	%
2025	1,093	47.94%	1,170	51.32%	17	0.75%
2021	993	53.24%	848	45.47%	24	1.29%
2017	704	51.92%	626	46.17%	26	1.92%
2013	960	67.94%	419	29.65%	34	2.41%
2009	887	55.65%	553	34.69%	154	9.66%
2005	756	46.24%	800	48.93%	79	4.83%

In the 2013 gubernatorial election, Republican Chris Christie received 67.9% of the vote (960), ahead of Democrat Barbara Buono with 29.7% (419), and other candidates with 2.4% (34), with 1,442 ballots cast by the borough's 3,166 registered voters (29 were spoiled), for a turnout of 45.5%. In the 2009 gubernatorial election, Christie received 55.1% of the vote (887), ahead of Democrat Jon Corzine with 34.3% (553), Independent Chris Daggett with 7.1% (115) and other candidates with 2.4% (39), with 1,611 ballots cast by the borough's 3,216 registered voters, a 50.1% turnout.

United States Senate election results for Highlands1
Year	Republican		Democratic		Third party(ies)	
Year	No.	%	No.	%	No.	%
2024	1,270	48.49%	1,271	48.53%	78	2.98%
2018	922	48.73%	884	46.72%	86	4.55%
2012	859	47.30%	918	50.55%	39	2.15%
2006	760	45.45%	860	51.44%	52	3.11%

United States Senate election results for Highlands2
Year	Republican		Democratic		Third party(ies)	
Year	No.	%	No.	%	No.	%
2020	1,336	47.90%	1,387	49.73%	66	2.37%
2014	480	46.83%	517	50.44%	28	2.73%
2013	384	47.76%	408	50.75%	12	1.49%
2008	983	44.12%	1,183	53.10%	62	2.78%

== Education ==
Students in public school for pre-kindergarten through twelfth grade from both Atlantic Highlands and Highlands are served by the Henry Hudson Regional School District. The district came into existence as of July 1, 2024, through the consolidation of the formerly independent Atlantic Highlands School District and Highlands School District with Henry Hudson Regional High School into a single school district. As of the 2024–25 school year, the district, comprised of three schools, had an enrollment of 725 students and 86.7 classroom teachers (on an FTE basis), for a student–teacher ratio of 8.4:1. Schools in the district (with 2024–25 enrollment from the National Center for Educational Statistics) are Atlantic Highlands Elementary School with 282 students in grades PreK–6, Highlands Elementary School with 153 students in grades PreK–6 and Henry Hudson Regional High School with 278 students in grades 7–12.

== Transportation ==
=== Roads and highways ===
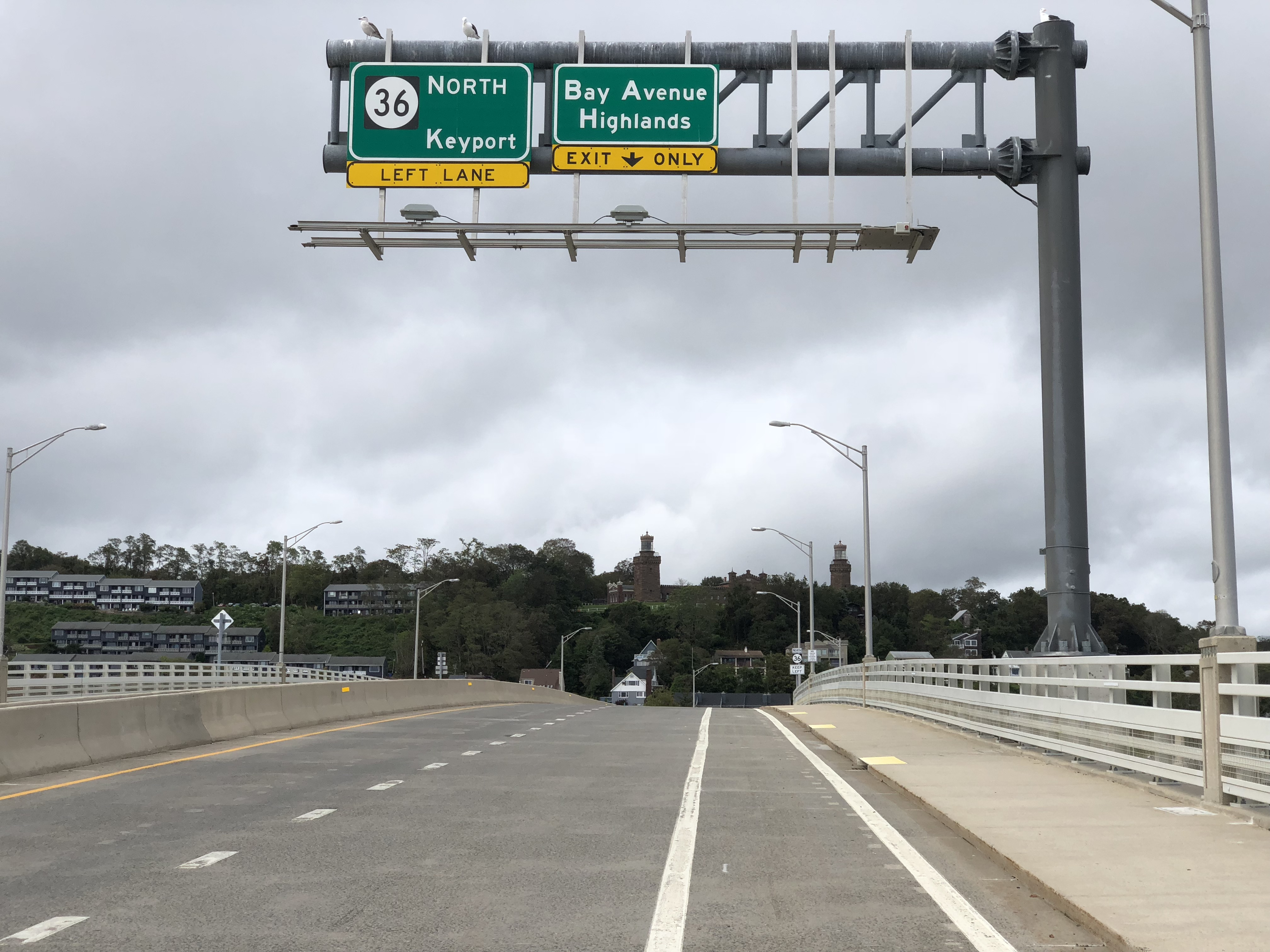
Route 36 northbound entering Highlands

As of May 2010, the borough had a total of 15.19 miles (24.45 km) of roadways, of which 12.50 miles (20.12 km) were maintained by the municipality, 1.52 miles (2.45 km) by Monmouth County and 1.17 miles (1.88 km) by the New Jersey Department of Transportation.

Route 36 is the main highway through Highlands. At the east end of the borough, Route 36 connects to Sea Bright by way of the Highlands–Sea Bright Bridge.

=== Public transportation ===
NJ Transit provides local bus transportation on the 834 route between the borough and Red Bank. Academy Bus offers bus service to the Port Authority Bus Terminal in Midtown Manhattan and to Wall Street.

SeaStreak offers ferry service to Manhattan at Conner's Ferry Landing. There are three morning trips, which stop at Pier 11/Wall Street and then at East 34th Street Ferry Landing. Six ferry trips return each weekday evening.

== Popular culture ==
The Kevin Smith film Jersey Girl is set in Highlands, but was filmed in Paulsboro, New Jersey.

In addition, Highlands' ZIP code (07732) is featured in the opening titles of Mallrats, and is Dante's ZIP code in Clerks: The Animated Series, although it is misattributed in the show to nearby Leonardo.

== Notable people ==
People who were born in, residents of, or otherwise closely associated with Highlands include:

- Gertrude Ederle (1905–2003), swimmer who was the first woman to swim across the English Channel, she learned to swim in Highlands during summers spent living in the borough
- John J. Flemm (1896–1974), industrialist, politician and Navy veteran who founded the Flemm Lead Company
- Walt Flanagan (born 1967), comic book store manager, reality television personality, podcaster and comic book artist
- Dan Gerrity (1953–2013), film, stage and television actor
- Bryan Johnson (born 1967), co-host of the Tell 'Em Steve-Dave! and star of Comic Book Men
- Jason Mewes (born 1974), actor who is best known for his role as Jay, the vocal half of the duo Jay and Silent Bob
- Frankie Montecalvo (born 1990), racing driver who was the 2015 Pirelli World Challenge GTA Driver's Champion and competes in the WeatherTech SportsCar Championship
- Kevin Smith (born 1970), filmmaker and actor

Preceded by Sandy Hook	Beaches of New Jersey	Succeeded by Sea Bright
