= Flemm Lead Company =

New York USA lead company

- Company type: Private
- Industry: Lead
- Founded: 1927
- Founder: John J. Flemm
- Defunct: 1970s
- Headquarters: Long Island City, Queens, New York City, United States
- Key people: John Flemm (founder, chairman, and president)
- Products: Lead pipes, lead paint, lead toys, lead glass, and other lead-based products

The Flemm Lead Company was a lead smelting and manufacturing company based in New York. It was one of the largest lead companies in the United States.

== History ==
In 1927, John J. Flemm established the Flemm Lead Company in Long Island City, Queens, New York City, New York.

In addition to its headquarters in New York, Flemm Lead operated facilities in Puerto Rico and Michigan through its subsidiary, the Detroit Lead Pipe Works Company.

In 1941, Flemm Lead was noted by the United States Department of Commerce as an "acceptor" of the voluntary commercial standard for lead pipes, proposed by the Lead Industries Association.

In 1943, the Red Cross awarded the Flemm Lead Company the American Red Cross Award for contributions to the 1943 American Red Cross War Fund.

The EPA designated a superfund site for Flemm Lead's location in Long Island City; requiring a long-term response to clean up hazardous material contaminations.
