= Cicely Cottingham =

American painter

Cicely Cottingham is an American artist who lives and works in West Orange, New Jersey. She has received numerous awards for her paintings and works on paper and is represented in several public collections. Cottingham is a cofounder (1991) of Aljira Design, a design studio and revenue stream through 2009 for the nonprofit art center Aljira, a Center for Contemporary Art in Newark, NJ.

== Early life and education ==
Cottingham was born in Brooklyn, New York City, and grew up in an old farmhouse in Atlantic Highlands, New Jersey. Before settling in West Orange, New Jersey, she lived and worked in New York City, England, and Cambridge, Massachusetts. She has a Bachelor of Fine Art degree from Pratt Institute, Brooklyn.

== Art ==
Cottingham works primarily with water-based paints on wood, on hardboard panels, and on paper. Describing her own work, Cottingham says,

Although I could describe my subject matter as painting itself—that my goal is to complete a painting that makes sense to me formally, emotionally, intellectually—my work is always rooted in my experience of the woods, light and atmosphere of my childhood home. Embedded in each painting is the internalization of my physical environment. I am able to carry an experience of a particular landscape or location or sky or moment with me for a long time before it is released in a painting or series of paintings.

=== Career and honors ===
Rrecognition that Cottingham has received for her work.

Year	Fellowship or Award
2011–2012	The Joan Mitchell Foundation Painters and Sculptors Grant
1999	Rutgers Center for Innovative Print and Paper Fellowship Award
1994–95	NJ State Council on the Arts Fellowship Award
1995	Residency, The Millay Colony for the Arts, Lila Acheson Wallace Foundation Grant
1986–87	NJ State Council on the Arts Fellowship Award
1986–87	Pollock/Krasner Foundation Grant
1986–87	Hereward Lester Cooke Foundation Grant
1983–84	NJ State Council on the Arts Fellowship Award

Cottingham's work is in the permanent collections of the Newark Museum and the Institute for Jazz Studies, Rutgers University-Newark. Her print Still Life Design for Living (variation): Beauford is in the permanent collections of the Montclair Art Museum, Jersey City Museum, Jane Voorhees Zimmerli Art Museum, The Noyes Museum of Art, Newark Public Library, Morris Museum and New Jersey State Council on the Arts. Corporate collections include Prudential, Bristol-Meyers Squibb Co., Johnson & Johnson and McGraw Hill.

She has exhibited widely in group and solo exhibitions. Her work has been written about in the New York Times, New Art Examiner, Review, and Artnet Magazine.
