= Engelbert Brenner =

American oboist (1904–1986)

Engelbert Brenner (August 15, 1904 Vienna – September 16, 1986, Atlantic Highlands, New Jersey), was a soloist on oboe and then English horn who played for 41 years with the New York Philharmonic Orchestra.

Brenner was born in Vienna. He was educated in Europe, and attended New York University and the Manhattan School of Music. He played with the Cleveland Orchestra starting in 1929. He joined the New York Philharmonic in 1932, where he played under the direction of conductors Arturo Toscanini and Leonard Bernstein, among others.

Brenner was a resident of Atlantic Highlands, New Jersey.
