= Dan Gerrity =

American film, stage and television actor

- Born: December 21, 1953; Red Bank, New Jersey, U.S.
- Died: November 20, 2013 (aged 59); Santa Fe, New Mexico, U.S.
- Occupation: Actor
- Years active: 1979–2012

Dan Gerrity (December 21, 1953 – November 20, 2013) was an American film, stage and television actor.

== Life and career ==
Gerrity was born in Red Bank, New Jersey, the son of Rita Gerrity. He was raised in Highlands, New Jersey. He moved to Los Angeles, California in the 1970s, and performed on stage, playing roles at the Odyssey Theater, the Tiffany Theater and the Mark Taper Forum. He began his screen career in 1979, appearing in the ABC sitcom television series Operation Petticoat. In 1984, he appeared in the films Annie's Coming Out and Crimes of Passion.

Later in his career, Gerrity guest-starred in television programs including Cheers (and its spin-off Frasier), The Adventures of Brisco County, Jr., Knots Landing, The West Wing, The King of Queens, Night Court, Head of the Class and Grounded for Life, and played the recurring role of Ed Mizerac in the ABC legal drama television series Murder One. He also appeared in films such as Jawbreaker and Swing Vote. During his screen career, he wrote the stage play Melody Jones: A Striptease in Two Acts, and worked as a news director at KSFR-FM.

Gerrity retired from acting in 2012, last appearing in the film The Company You Keep.

== Death ==
Gerrity died of a heart attack in Santa Fe, New Mexico on November 20, 2013, at the age of 59.
