= Ruth Crawford Mitchell =

American economist (1890–1984)

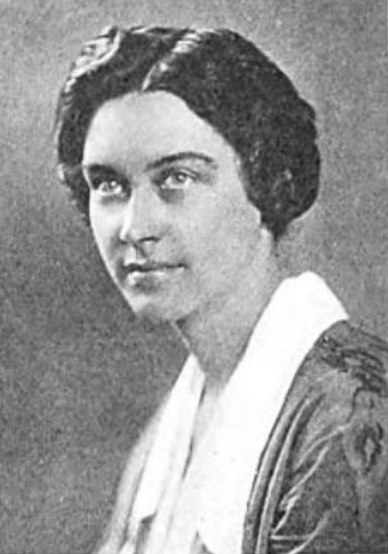
- Ruth Crawford Mitchell, from a 1929 publication
- Born: June 2, 1890; Atlantic Highlands, New Jersey, U.S.
- Died: February 7, 1984 (aged 93)
- Relatives: Edward Parmelee Smith (grandfather)

Ruth Crawford Mitchell (June 2, 1890 – February 7, 1984) was the founding director of the University of Pittsburgh's Nationality Rooms in the Cathedral of Learning and had major oversight during the design, drafting and creation of the rooms between 1926 and 1956. She also raised the necessary funding for the project in addition to supervising architects and other contractors during the construction of the building. She worked with immigrants in Pittsburgh and overseas committees to establish sponsorship of each classroom.

== Early life ==
Mitchell's family also was active in working with ethnically diverse populations in the US and abroad. Mitchell's grandfather, Edward Parmelee Smith, worked for the American Missionary Association which provided educational opportunities for Native Americans. He later was the U.S. Commissioner of Indian Affairs and went on to become the President-elect of Howard University. Hanford Crawford, Mitchell's father, attended universities in Germany and met his wife in Stuttgart. Mitchell's parents married and moved to St. Louis where Hanford worked as an executive in a department store.

Mitchell was born on June 2, 1890, in Atlantic Highlands, New Jersey. She attended school at the Mary Institute in Atlantic Highlands and graduated from Vassar in 1912. She continued her education by earning a master's degree in social work at the Washington University in St. Louis George Warren Brown School of Social Work. Her master's thesis was entitled The Immigrant in St. Louis. She began doctoral work at Johns Hopkins University but did not complete her studies there. In 1914, she worked as the YWCA's Field Secretary for the Immigration and Foreign Community Program of the YWCA.

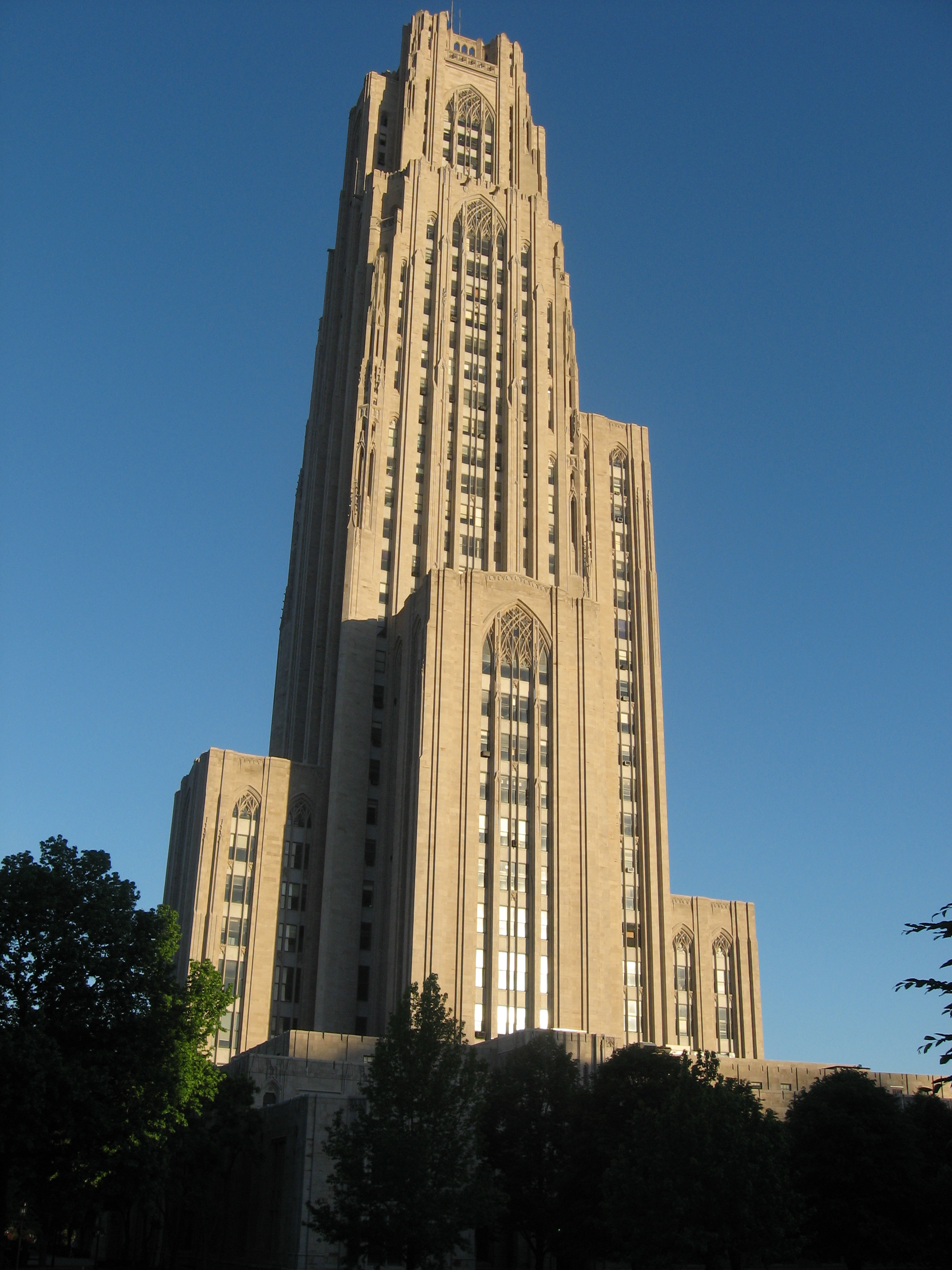
Cathedral of Learning at the University of Pittsburgh

== Career ==
Mitchell was a lecturer at the University of Pittsburgh in the Department of Economics. She led the project that resulted in the provision of support for foreign-born students at the university. Mitchell was recognized for her efforts to assimilate second-generation students into the university. She was the founding director of the University of Pittsburgh's Nationality Rooms in the Cathedral of Learning and had major oversight during the design, drafting and creation of the rooms between 1926 and 1956.

== Collection ==
Her personal and professional papers were donated to the University of Pittsburgh Library System on August 15, 1968. The collection consists mainly of Mitchell's Nativity Study conducted the University of Pittsburgh between 1926 and 1930. The Nativity Study was generated to document the attendance of immigrant and first generation American students attending the university. The study was used to support efforts to provide better services for these students. The collection also contains other immigrant studies, personal papers and lecture notes.
