= Peter E. Fleming Jr. =

American lawyer

- Born: August 18, 1929; Atlantic Highlands, New Jersey
- Died: January 14, 2009 (aged 79); New York City, US
- Education: Yale Law School, Princeton University
- Occupation: Criminal defense attorney

Peter E. Fleming Jr. (August 18, 1929 – January 14, 2009) was a criminal-defense lawyer known for his A-list roster of clients.

Fleming was a defense attorney on a highly controversial case known as the "Vesco Trial" United States v. John Mitchell and Maurice Stans. The trial stated that John N. Mitchell and Maurice Stans had been involved in fraudulent activity involving financier Robert Vesco. The belief was that both Mitchell and Stans had promised to aid Vesco in avoiding the Department of Justice if he donated $200,000 to the Committee to Re-Elect the President during Richard Nixon's second bid for office.

John Mitchell, former Attorney General, was defended by Fleming. After a year of investigation and litigation both Maurice Stans and John Mitchell were acquitted in 1974. It was a miraculous turn out and earned Peter Fleming a stable career as a defense attorney. Mitchell was eventually re-indicted and served time in prison. Stans was released from all charges until 1975, when he was convicted of obstruction of justice after which he paid a $5,000 fine.

The Vesco trial gave Fleming immense credibility and established his career having successfully defended a former Attorney General of the United States.
