= The Immigrant in St. Louis (book) =

1916 non-fiction book

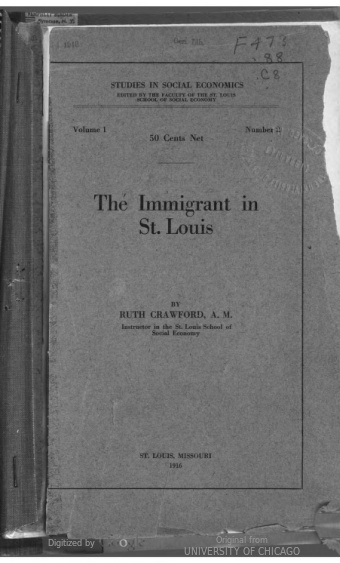
- Author: Ruth Crawford
- Language: English
- Genre: Non-fiction
- Publication date: 1916
- Publication place: United States

The Immigrant in St. Louis, a survey (published 1916, written by Ruth Crawford) is a non-fiction book that tells of the average's immigrants lives in St. Louis in the early twentieth century. It includes many graphs and tables that details the number of occupations, households in what district, births, deaths, imprisonments, etc. from each cultural group.

It was one of the first books written and published for social work. Crawford, throughout the course of the book, emphasizes the need for current citizens to help immigrants assimilate to living in the United States. In this manner, all of the data she collected was to work to increasing social activism and help equalize the members of the St. Louis community.

In this piece of literature, Crawford touches on subjects of:

- The history of immigration to St. Louis
- The immigrants' arrival in St. Louis and the general first immersion
- Where the immigrants lived and their housing conditions
- The types of occupations kept by immigrants
- The typical education levels of immigrants in St. Louis
- The process and manner that immigrants were naturalized
- How immigrants assimilated to the city institutions
- Immigrants and relief agencies
- The work of religious and social agencies with immigrants
- The Mullanphy Fund of St. Louis, and its effects for immigrants
