= Atlantic Highlands, New Jersey =

Borough in Monmouth County, New Jersey, US

- Borough
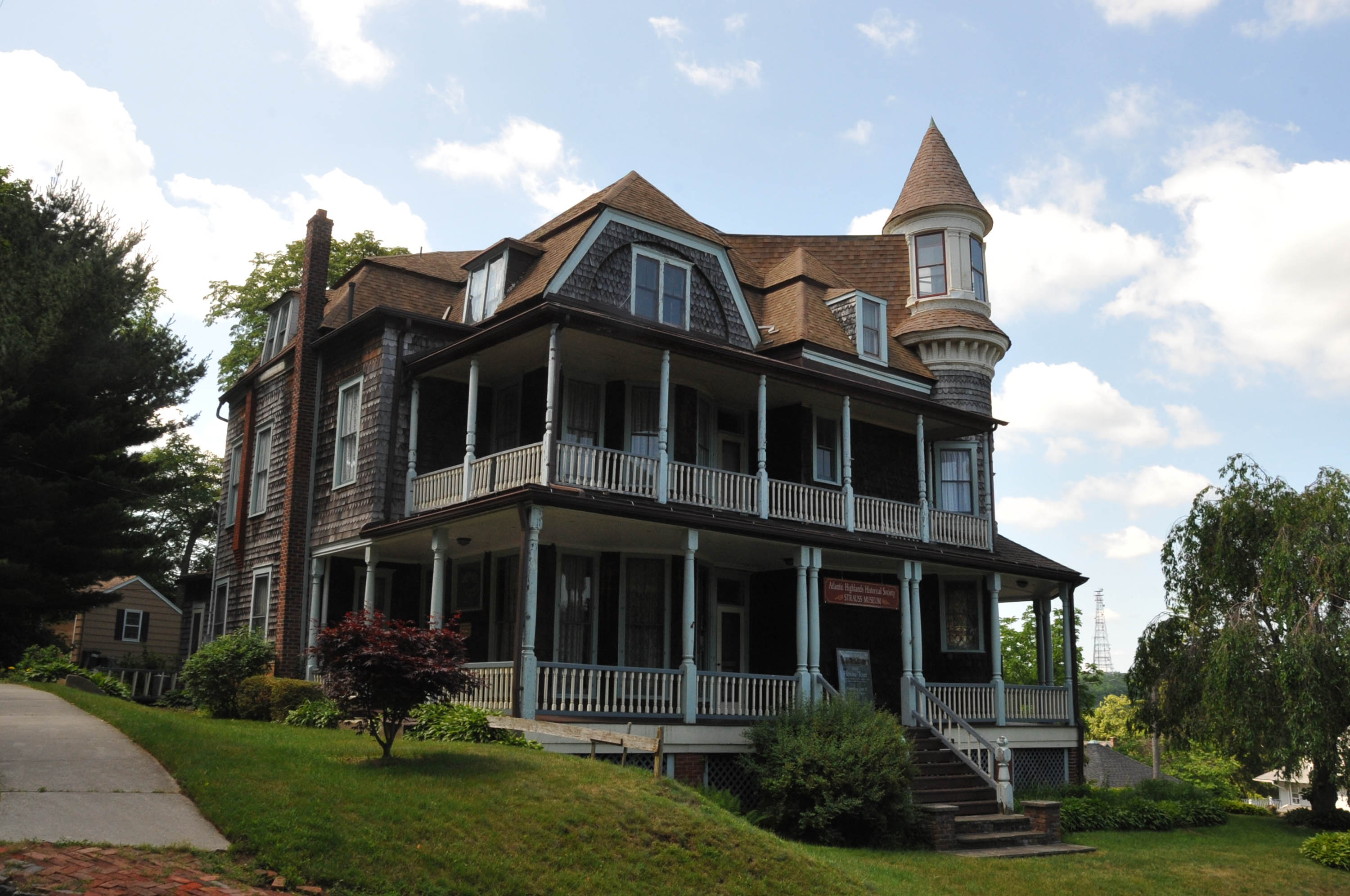
- Strauss Mansion

- Seal

- Location of Atlantic Highlands in Monmouth County highlighted in red (left). Inset map: Location of Monmouth County in New Jersey highlighted in orange (right).

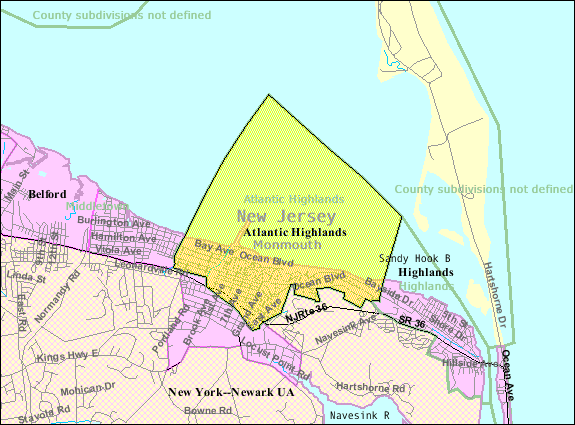
- Census Bureau map of Atlantic Highlands, New Jersey
- Interactive map of Atlantic Highlands, New Jersey
- Location in Monmouth County Location in New Jersey Location in the United States
- Coordinates: 40.411771°N 74.019836°W
- Country: United States
- State: New Jersey
- County: Monmouth
- Incorporated: February 28, 1887
- Named for: Location overlooking Atlantic Ocean

Government
  - Type: Borough
  - Body: Borough Council
  - Mayor: Lori Hohenleitner (D, term ends December 31, 2027)
  - Administrator: Caleb Stratton
  - Municipal clerk: Michelle Clark

Area
  - Total: 4.56 sq mi (11.82 km^{2})
  - Land: 1.26 sq mi (3.27 km^{2})
  - Water: 3.30 sq mi (8.54 km^{2}) 72.35%
  - Rank: 282nd of 565 in state 20th of 53 in county
- Elevation: 266 ft (81 m)

Population (2020)
  - Total: 4,414
  - Estimate (2023): 4,383
  - Rank: 399th of 565 in state 36th of 53 in county
  - Density: 3,491.9/sq mi (1,348.2/km^{2})
  - Rank: 195th of 565 in state 21st of 53 in county
- Time zone: UTC−05:00 (Eastern (EST))
  - Summer (DST): UTC−04:00 (Eastern (EDT))
- ZIP Code: 07716
- Area codes: 732 exchanges: 291, 708, 872
- FIPS code: 3402502110
- GNIS feature ID: 0885143
- Website: www.ahnj.com

Atlantic Highlands is a borough in Monmouth County in the U.S. state of New Jersey, in the Bayshore Region. As of the 2020 United States census, the borough's population was 4,414, an increase of 29 (+0.7%) from the 2010 census count of 4,385, which in turn reflected a decline of 320 (−6.8%) from the 4,705 in the 2000 census.

Atlantic Highlands contains Mount Mitchill, the highest point on the eastern seaboard south of Maine, rising 266 feet (81 m) above sea level. The borough's name comes from its location overlooking the Atlantic Ocean.

Atlantic Highlands was incorporated as a borough by an act of the New Jersey Legislature on February 28, 1887, from portions of Middletown Township, based on the results of a referendum held that day. The borough was reincorporated on September 1, 1891.

Atlantic Highlands was part of the Bayshore Regional Strategic Plan, an effort by nine municipalities in northern Monmouth County to reinvigorate the area's economy by emphasizing the traditional downtowns, dense residential neighborhoods, maritime history, and the natural beauty of the Raritan Bayshore coastline. The plan has since been integrated into the county's 2016 Master Plan.

== History ==
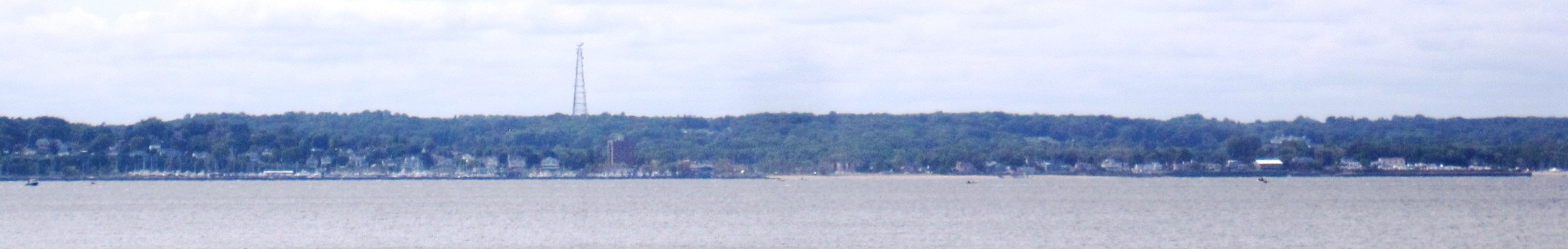
Atlantic Highlands as seen from Sandy Hook, New Jersey

The town overlooks where the Atlantic Ocean and Raritan Bay meet at Sandy Hook, and its hills mark the highest point on the eastern seaboard of the U.S. south of Maine.

For hundreds of years, the original inhabitants were the Lenape, who lived in and along the cliffs and creeks of Atlantic Highlands. The Lenape traded with the Europeans and sold a group of English settlers an area that covered the entire peninsula that was named Portland Poynt. The area was laid out with 10 lots in 1667, making them the first European residents of present-day Atlantic Highlands.

Colonists convened the first Assembly of New Jersey in 1667 in what is now Atlantic Highlands. During Revolutionary War years, loyalists to the British crown and patriots of the new America clashed in repeated raids and counterattacks across these lands. Retreating English troops passed through after their defeat in 1778 by George Washington at the Battle of Monmouth.

During the late 1800s, the many farms were subdivided by resort developers, church groups and builders who created the Victorian core of the borough, attracting thousands of visitors and year-round residents.

In 1879, a surveyor was engaged to lay roads and lots for a permanent community. The Atlantic Highlands Association was formed by prominent members of the Methodist Church. This organization developed the community of Atlantic Highlands.

Individuals and groups came from New York City and the surrounding vicinity to camp along the water in tent colonies. An outdoor amphitheater was created with a large seating capacity and outstanding acoustics. An indoor auditorium was built, which was utilized for entertaining visitors at the camp meetings. In 1887, Atlantic Highlands was incorporated as a borough, containing 1.2 square miles (3.1 km^{2}) of land bordering on the Raritan Bay.

Major construction occurred from the 1880s through 1900. It included hotels, cottages, rooming houses, and private homes. A pier was built extending well into the bay to accommodate steamboats from New York City. The next twenty years saw rapid development within the community. A water and sewer system was constructed, cottages were erected, and the road system was completed. During this period of development a fire department was organized.

A number of churches saw their beginning in the 1880s: the Central Baptist, First Presbyterian, Saint Agnes Roman Catholic, First Methodist, and Saint Paul Baptist Church.

Atlantic Highlands became a haven for bootleggers during the Prohibition era.

Steamer service was the most important transport during the formation of the borough, and continued through the 1940s. In the 1890s, rail service came to Atlantic Highlands. This opened up Highlands and points south to vacationers. The 1920s saw 26 passenger trains daily passing through the borough. The Central Railroad of New Jersey built a major pier at the end of First Avenue. Several trains at a time could continue to the end of the pier to offload steamboat passengers. From the 1910s through the 1940s, the steamers Sandy Hook and the Monmouth navigated the waters bringing businessmen and vacationers to Atlantic Highlands.

The Manhattan skyline can be seen from the borough's ridges and its shoreline. Pleasure, fishing and commuter boats sail from its harbor. The municipal harbor was built from 1938 through 1940 with municipal, state, and federal funds. It is the largest on the East Coast, home to 715 craft, including high-speed ferry service to New York City, which was introduced in 1986. In 1966, the Central Railroad of New Jersey pier was destroyed by fire. Its rail route is now used by the Henry Hudson Trail.

The bungalows on the East Side of the borough, which were summer bungalows in the 1920s, are now occupied year-round. Portland Pointe as a five-story residence for senior citizens.

== Geography ==
According to the United States Census Bureau, the borough had a total area of 4.56 square miles (11.82 km^{2}), including 1.26 square miles (3.27 km^{2}) of land and 3.30 square miles (8.54 km^{2}) of water (72.35%).

The township borders the Monmouth County communities of Highlands and Middletown Township.

Unincorporated communities, localities and place names located partially or completely within the borough include Brevent Park, Hillside, Hilton, Hilton Park, Navesink and Stone Church.

Atlantic Highlands has a humid subtropical climate (Cfa) and average monthly temperatures range from 32.6 °F (0.3 °C) in January to 75.9 °F (24.4 °C) in July. The hardiness zone is 7a or 7b depending upon elevation.

== Demographics ==
Historical population
Census	Pop.	Note	%±
1890	945		—
1900	1,383		46.3%
1910	1,645		18.9%
1920	1,629		−1.0%
1930	2,000		22.8%
1940	2,335		16.8%
1950	3,083		32.0%
1960	4,119		33.6%
1970	5,102		23.9%
1980	4,950		−3.0%
1990	4,629		−6.5%
2000	4,705		1.6%
2010	4,385		−6.8%
2020	4,414		0.7%
2023 (est.)	4,383	▼	−0.7%
Population sources: 1890–1920; 1890–1910 1910–1930; 1940–2000 2000; 2010 2020

=== 2020 census ===
As of the 2020 census, Atlantic Highlands had a population of 4,414. The median age was 48.8 years. 17.6% of residents were under the age of 18 and 21.1% of residents were 65 years of age or older. For every 100 females there were 92.6 males, and for every 100 females age 18 and over there were 91.7 males age 18 and over.

100.0% of residents lived in urban areas, while 0.0% lived in rural areas.

There were 1,949 households in Atlantic Highlands, of which 22.6% had children under the age of 18 living in them. Of all households, 48.1% were married-couple households, 18.3% were households with a male householder and no spouse or partner present, and 28.1% were households with a female householder and no spouse or partner present. About 32.2% of all households were made up of individuals and 13.8% had someone living alone who was 65 years of age or older.

There were 2,092 housing units, of which 6.8% were vacant. The homeowner vacancy rate was 1.2% and the rental vacancy rate was 5.8%.

Racial composition as of the 2020 census
Race	Number	Percent
White	3,829	86.7%
Black or African American	54	1.2%
American Indian and Alaska Native	5	0.1%
Asian	85	1.9%
Native Hawaiian and Other Pacific Islander	1	0.0%
Some other race	107	2.4%
Two or more races	333	7.5%
Hispanic or Latino (of any race)	363	8.2%

=== 2010 census ===
The 2010 United States census counted 4,385 people, 1,870 households, and 1,186 families in the borough. The population density was 3,401.2 per square mile (1,313.2/km^{2}). There were 2,002 housing units at an average density of 1,552.9 per square mile (599.6/km^{2}). The racial makeup was 93.18% (4,086) White, 1.44% (63) Black or African American, 0.25% (11) Native American, 2.17% (95) Asian, 0.00% (0) Pacific Islander, 1.25% (55) from other races, and 1.71% (75) from two or more races. Hispanic or Latino of any race were 5.13% (225) of the population.

Of the 1,870 households, 25.5% had children under the age of 18; 51.9% were married couples living together; 8.6% had a female householder with no husband present and 36.6% were non-families. Of all households, 30.4% were made up of individuals and 11.2% had someone living alone who was 65 years of age or older. The average household size was 2.34 and the average family size was 2.96.

19.6% of the population were under the age of 18, 5.5% from 18 to 24, 24.9% from 25 to 44, 34.4% from 45 to 64, and 15.6% who were 65 years of age or older. The median age was 45.0 years. For every 100 females, the population had 95.2 males. For every 100 females ages 18 and older there were 94.2 males.

=== Income and poverty ===
The Census Bureau's 2006–2010 American Community Survey showed that (in 2010 inflation-adjusted dollars) median household income was $82,127 (with a margin of error of +/− $10,511) and the median family income was $100,117 (+/− $16,562). Males had a median income of $73,021 (+/− $18,808) versus $51,207 (+/− $6,155) for females. The per capita income for the borough was $41,785 (+/− $4,864). About 2.5% of families and 5.3% of the population were below the poverty line, including 6.9% of those under age 18 and 2.0% of those age 65 or over.

=== 2000 census ===
As of the 2000 United States census there were 4,705 people, 1,969 households, and 1,258 families residing in the borough. The population density was 3,805.4 inhabitants per square mile (1,469.3/km^{2}). There were 2,056 housing units at an average density of 1,662.9 per square mile (642.0/km^{2}). The racial makeup of the borough was 94.37% White, 2.30% African American, 0.06% Native American, 1.23% Asian, 1.02% from other races, and 1.02% from two or more races. Hispanic or Latino of any race were 3.51% of the population.

There were 1,969 households, out of which 26.5% had children under the age of 18 living with them, 50.7% were married couples living together, 9.6% had a female householder with no husband present, and 36.1% were non-families. 29.7% of all households were made up of individuals, and 11.4% had someone living alone who was 65 years of age or older. The average household size was 2.39 and the average family size was 3.00.

In the borough the age distribution of the population shows 21.4% under the age of 18, 6.2% from 18 to 24, 31.8% from 25 to 44, 26.5% from 45 to 64, and 14.1% who were 65 years of age or older. The median age was 40 years. For every 100 females, there were 93.5 males. For every 100 females age 18 and over, there were 88.3 males.

The median income for a household in the borough was $64,955, and the median income for a family was $79,044. Males had a median income of $60,857 versus $36,060 for females. The per capita income for the borough was $34,798. About 4.4% of families and 4.9% of the population were below the poverty line, including 5.0% of those under age 18 and 12.9% of those age 65 or over.

== Sports ==
Atlantic Highlands Recreation Committee organizes youth sports programs such as basketball in the winter, a field hockey clinic in the summer, and soccer in the fall. Sandy Hook Little League offers baseball and softball in the spring.

== Parks and recreation ==
Atlantic Highlands has eight parks owned by the borough and two operated by the county. One of larger parks is Lenape Woods. It is nestled among tall trees and steep slopes, Lenape Woods offers approximately 51 acres (210,000 m^{2}) of natural woodlands and freshwater wetlands that are the headwaters to Many Mind Creek. Many groups and local residents volunteer their time to maintain the woods. Monmouth County operates two parks in the town, Henry Hudson Trail and Mount Mitchill Scenic Overlook. Henry Hudson Trail runs 9 miles (14 km) from the Aberdeen/Keyport border at the intersection of Lloyd Road and Clark Street to the Atlantic Highlands border at Avenue D, and has been expanded to connect to Highlands. Mount Mitchill Scenic Overlook is located about 266 feet (81 m) above sea level, at the highest natural elevation from Maine to the Yucatán, providing views of Sandy Hook, Sandy Hook Bay, Raritan Bay and the New York skyline. This 12-acre (49,000 m^{2}) site is also home to Monmouth County's 9/11 Memorial.

== Arts and culture ==
The town's history can be learned at both the Queen Anne-style Strauss Mansion Museum, and the local maritime museum. Lodgings can be found at a number of cottages and inns, such as the Blue Bay Inn.

Entertainment venues include the First Avenue Playhouse, which offers dessert-and-dinner theater and puppet shows. Maritime attractions include a yacht club, marina and charter boats for fishing and touring. Other places of interest include a number of gift shops, galleries, and dining establishments.

Atlantic Highlands is also home to two annual film festivals, FilmOneFest and Smodcastle Film Festival.

According to the Monmouth County Master Plan, Atlantic Highlands has been designated as an Arts, Cultural, and Entertainment (ACE) Hub, which is defined as municipalities that have a high concentration of arts and cultural activities to serve as a destination for both visitors and locals, usually including an active nightlife scene in proximity to said cultural activities. Only eight towns in Monmouth County share this designation, with two additional towns designated as upcoming ACE hubs.

== Government ==
=== Local government ===
Atlantic Highlands is governed under the borough form of New Jersey municipal government, which is used in 218 municipalities (of the 564) statewide, making it the most common form of government in New Jersey. The governing body is comprised of the mayor and the borough council, with all positions elected at-large on a partisan basis as part of the November general election. The mayor is elected directly by the voters to a four-year term of office. The borough council includes six members elected to serve three-year terms on a staggered basis, with two seats coming up for election each year in a three-year cycle. The borough form of government used by Atlantic Highlands is a "weak mayor / strong council" government in which council members act as the legislative body with the mayor presiding at meetings and voting only in the event of a tie. The mayor can veto ordinances subject to an override by a two-thirds majority vote of the council. The mayor makes committee and liaison assignments for council members, and most appointments are made by the mayor with the advice and consent of the council.

As of 2026, the mayor of Atlantic Highlands is Democrat Lori Hohenleitner, whose term of office ends December 31, 2027. Members of the Borough Council are Council President Brian Dougherty (D, 2027), Jon Crowley (D, 2024), Alyson Forbes (D, 2026) Brian Gorsegner (D, 2028), Jose E. Pujols (D, 2027) and Kathleen Scatassa (D, 2028).

=== Federal, state and county representation ===
Atlantic Highlands is located in the 6th Congressional district and is part of New Jersey's 13th state legislative district.

For the 119th United States Congress, New Jersey's 6th congressional district is represented by Frank Pallone (D, Long Branch). New Jersey is represented in the United States Senate by Democrats Cory Booker (Newark, term ends 2027) and Andy Kim (Moorestown, term ends 2031).

For the 2026–2027 session, the 13th legislative district of the New Jersey Legislature is represented in the New Jersey Senate by Declan O'Scanlon (R, Little Silver) and in the General Assembly by Vicky Flynn (R, Holmdel Township) and Gerard Scharfenberger (R, Middletown Township).

Monmouth County is governed by a Board of County Commissioners composed of five members who are elected at-large to serve three-year terms of office on a staggered basis, with either one or two seats up for election each year as part of the November general election. At an annual reorganization meeting held in the beginning of January, the board selects one of its members to serve as director and another as deputy director.

As of 2025, Monmouth County's Commissioners are Director Thomas A. Arnone (R, Neptune City, 2025), Susan M. Kiley (R, Hazlet Township, 2027), Erik Anderson (R, Shrewsbury, 2026), Nick DiRocco (R, Wall Township, 2025), and Deputy Director Ross F. Licitra (R, Marlboro Township, 2026).

Constitutional officers elected on a countywide basis are Clerk Christine Giordano Hanlon (R, 2025; Ocean Township), Sheriff Shaun Golden (R, 2025; Howell Township) and Surrogate Rosemarie D. Peters (R, 2026; Middletown Township).

=== Politics ===
United States presidential election results for Atlantic Highlands
Year	Republican		Democratic		Third party(ies)	
Year	No.	%	No.	%	No.	%
2024	1,249	42.98%	1,592	54.78%	65	2.24%
2020	1,243	41.68%	1,682	56.41%	57	1.91%
2016	1,197	47.18%	1,214	47.85%	126	4.97%
2012	1,124	48.32%	1,167	50.17%	35	1.50%
2008	1,287	49.94%	1,242	48.20%	48	1.86%
2004	1,350	51.68%	1,232	47.17%	30	1.15%
2000	1,104	46.17%	1,152	48.18%	135	5.65%
1996	885	41.36%	1,037	48.46%	218	10.19%
1992	995	41.29%	913	37.88%	502	20.83%

As of March 2011, there were a total of 3,238 registered voters in Atlantic Highlands, of which 842 (26.0%) were registered as Democrats, 800 (24.7%) were registered as Republicans and 1,589 (49.1%) were registered as Unaffiliated. There were seven voters registered as Libertarians or Greens.

Gubernatorial election results for Atlantic Highlands
Year	Republican		Democratic		Third party(ies)	
Year	No.	%	No.	%	No.	%
2025	1,026	41.64%	1,423	57.75%	15	0.61%
2021	1,006	48.41%	1,033	49.71%	39	1.88%
2017	827	47.89%	869	50.32%	31	1.80%
2013	989	64.47%	509	33.18%	36	2.35%
2009	1,020	57.30%	604	33.93%	156	8.76%
2005	939	53.26%	720	40.84%	104	5.90%

In the 2012 presidential election, Democrat Barack Obama received 50.2% of the vote (1,167 cast), ahead of Republican Mitt Romney with 48.3% (1,124 votes), and other candidates with 1.5% (35 votes), among the 2,342 ballots cast by the borough's 3,329 registered voters (16 ballots were spoiled), for a turnout of 70.4%. In the 2008 presidential election, Republican John McCain received 49.3% of the vote (1,287 cast), ahead of Democrat Barack Obama with 47.5% (1,242 votes) and other candidates with 1.8% (48 votes), among the 2,612 ballots cast by the borough's 3,454 registered voters, for a turnout of 75.6%. In the 2004 presidential election, Republican George W. Bush received 50.7% of the vote (1,350 ballots cast), outpolling Democrat John Kerry with 46.3% (1,232 votes) and other candidates with 0.9% (30 votes), among the 2,663 ballots cast by the borough's 3,464 registered voters, for a turnout percentage of 76.9.

In the 2013 gubernatorial election, Republican Chris Christie received 64.5% of the vote (989 cast), ahead of Democrat Barbara Buono with 33.2% (509 votes), and other candidates with 2.3% (36 votes), among the 1,547 ballots cast by the borough's 3,357 registered voters (13 ballots were spoiled), for a turnout of 46.1%. In the 2009 gubernatorial election, Republican Chris Christie received 56.9% of the vote (1,020 ballots cast), ahead of Democrat Jon Corzine with 33.7% (604 votes), Independent Chris Daggett with 6.9% (124 votes) and other candidates with 1.8% (32 votes), among the 1,794 ballots cast by the borough's 3,309 registered voters, yielding a 54.2% turnout.

United States Senate election results for Atlantic Highlands1
Year	Republican		Democratic		Third party(ies)	
Year	No.	%	No.	%	No.	%
2024	1,217	43.31%	1,529	54.41%	64	2.28%
2018	1,042	48.33%	1,023	47.45%	91	4.22%
2012	1,182	52.74%	1,023	45.65%	36	1.61%
2006	965	53.31%	800	44.20%	45	2.49%

United States Senate election results for Atlantic Highlands2
Year	Republican		Democratic		Third party(ies)	
Year	No.	%	No.	%	No.	%
2020	1,284	43.61%	1,611	54.72%	49	1.66%
2014	669	46.27%	736	50.90%	41	2.84%
2013	504	49.66%	496	48.87%	15	1.48%
2008	1,214	50.14%	1,145	47.29%	62	2.56%

== Transportation ==
=== Roads and highways ===
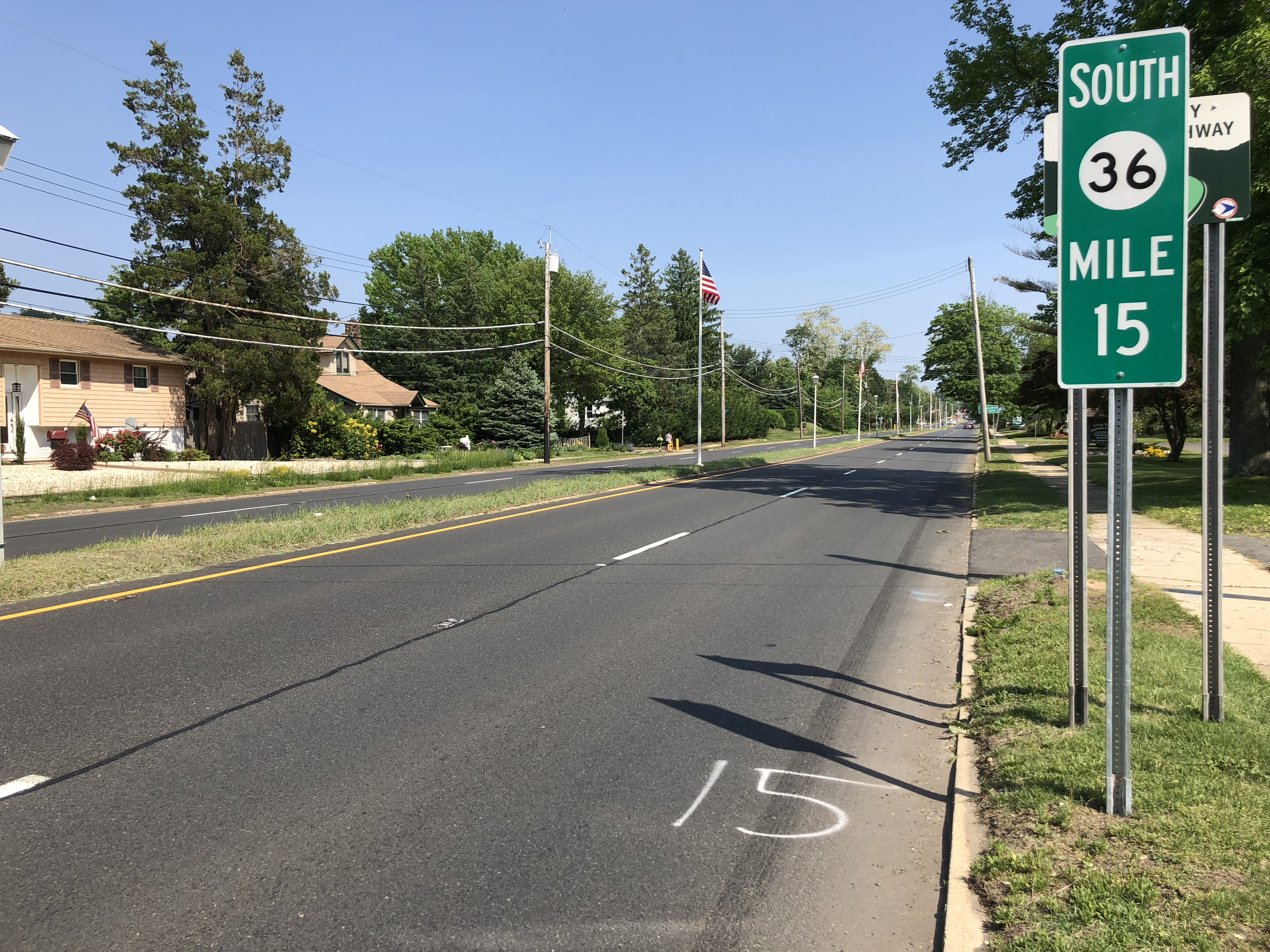
Route 36 in Atlantic Highlands

As of May 2010, the borough had a total of 24.59 miles (39.57 km) of roadways, of which 21.06 miles (33.89 km) were maintained by the municipality, 2.63 miles (4.23 km) by Monmouth County and 0.90 miles (1.45 km) by the New Jersey Department of Transportation.

New Jersey Route 36 is the main highway running through Atlantic Highlands. The closest limited-access road is the Garden State Parkway, which is accessible via Route 36.

=== Public transportation ===
Atlantic Highlands is a stop for the SeaStreak Ferry, which travels from the East 34th Street Ferry Landing and Pier 11/Wall Street (with shuttle bus service to the World Financial Center) in Manhattan daily.

NJ Transit provides local bus transportation on the 834 route.

== Education ==
Students in public school for pre-kindergarten through twelfth grade from both Atlantic Highlands and Highlands are served by the Henry Hudson Regional School District. The district came into existence as of July 1, 2024, through the consolidation of the formerly independent Atlantic Highlands School District and Highlands School District with Henry Hudson Regional High School into a single school district. As of the 2024–25 school year, the district, comprised of three schools, had an enrollment of 725 students and 86.7 classroom teachers (on an FTE basis), for a student–teacher ratio of 8.4:1. Schools in the district (with 2024–25 enrollment from the National Center for Educational Statistics) are Atlantic Highlands Elementary School with 282 students in grades PreK–6, Highlands Elementary School with 153 students in grades PreK–6 and Henry Hudson Regional High School with 278 students in grades 7–12.

== Notable people ==
People who were born in, residents of, or otherwise closely associated with Atlantic Highlands include:

- Jeff Anderson (born 1970), actor, best known as Randal Graves in Kevin Smith's Clerks
- Engelbert Brenner (1904–1986), soloist with the New York Philharmonic Orchestra who was active locally as a conductor with the municipal band and as a tree warden
- Donald Brown (born 1987), running back who has played in the NFL for the Indianapolis Colts and San Diego Chargers
- Leonard S. Coleman Jr. (born 1949), last president of the National League, serving from 1994 until 1999 when the position was eliminated by Major League Baseball
- Steve Corodemus (born 1952), represented the 11th Legislative District in the New Jersey General Assembly from 1992 to 2008, and was a member of the Atlantic Highlands Borough Council from 1986 to 1988
- Cicely Cottingham, artist best known for her paintings and works on paper
- Burgoyne Diller (1906–1965), abstract painter
- Peter E. Fleming Jr. (1929–2009), criminal defense lawyer
- John J. Flemm (1896–1974), businessman and politician
- Anna Genovese (1905–1982), businesswoman and second wife of mobster Vito Genovese
- Vito Genovese (1897–1969), mob enforcer who helped shape the rise of the American Mafia and would later lead Luciano's crime family, which was renamed the Genovese crime family
- Steven Gluckstein (born 1990), trampoline athlete.
- John A. Hall (1877–1919), collegiate football player who was head coach of the Carlisle Indians football team in 1898
- Emerson Hart (born 1969), songwriter, vocalist, guitarist and producer who is the lead singer and songwriter of the alternative rock band Tonic
- Reamer Keller (1905–1994), cartoonist who often drew 50 cartoons a week and routinely published a thousand cartoons annually for decades
- Bernard F. Martin (1845–1914), politicians from New York City who served in the New York State Senate
- Ruth Crawford Mitchell (1890–1984), immigrant advocate and designer of the Cathedral of Learning's Nationality Rooms at the University of Pittsburgh
- Knowshon Moreno (born 1987), running back who has played in the NFL for the Denver Broncos and Miami Dolphins
- Sterling Stryker (1895–1926), Major League Baseball pitcher
- Jerry Vasto (born 1992), former MLB pitcher who played for the Colorado Rockies and Kansas City Royals
- Max Weinberg (born 1951), drummer for Bruce Springsteen's E Street Band and television personality
- Bill Wenzel (1918–1987), cartoonist best known for his good girl art
