= Housing in Florida =

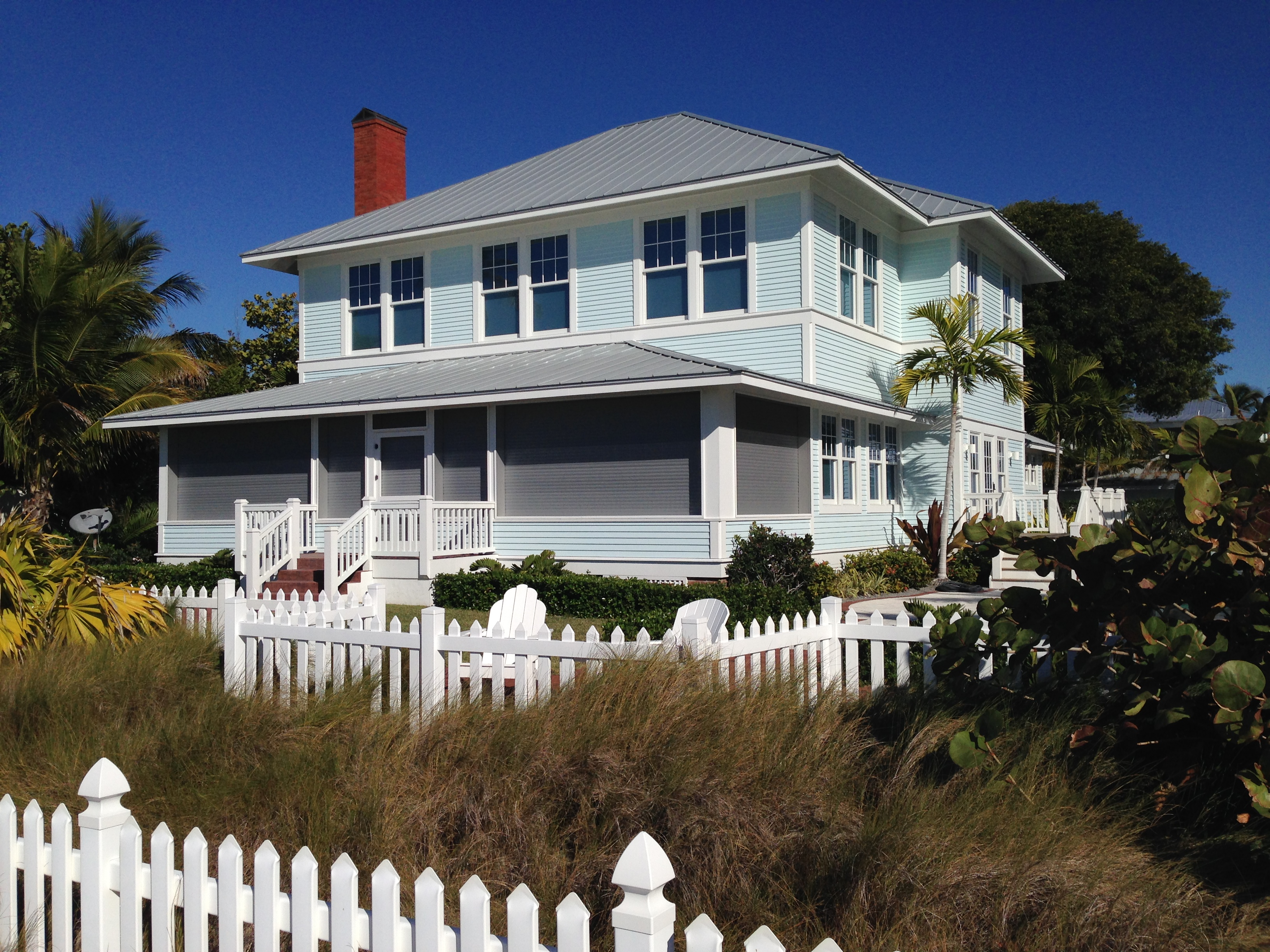
House in Boca Grande, Florida

Housing in Florida consists of apartments, condominiums, hotels, retirement communities, and houses. Common types of housing in the state include Cracker-style homes, Ranch-style homes, Caribbean-style homes, and condominiums with architectural styles including Spanish Colonial Revival, Victorian, Mediterranean Revival, Art Deco, Pueblo Revival, and modern.

== Types ==
=== Hotels ===
In 2020, there were 3,903 hotel properties in Florida, consisting of 458,721 hotel and motel rooms. In 2019, the American Automobile Association reported that Florida was the 2nd cleanest state in the U.S. by hotel cleanliness, having 485 hotels in the top 25%. Orlando, Florida, was the 4th cleanest city in the country, having 69 hotels in the top 25%.

=== Apartments ===
Apartments are that of a larger company such as a leasing company. These homes are usually single unit residences that are rented on a monthly or yearly basis with the owner of the complex. Apartments are most commonly used by small families, couples, and singles due to their lease flexibility, lower cost, and smaller size. Although nearly every city in Florida has apartments, the larger cities tend to have a much higher volume of these residences.

=== Condominiums ===
Many of the condominiums in Florida are considered high-rise condominiums and can feature architecture styles from art deco and more modern forms of architecture. These stand alone buildings are often home to hundreds of individually owned homes that are slightly larger than their hotel counterparts. With the rise of timeshare in the 1970s, many condos in these condominiums are group owned and shared throughout the year amongst the different owners. Condo owners usually share joint facilities such as pools and beachfronts. These communal amenities are commonly shared expenses with each owner being responsible for their share of the cost involved in upkeep.

=== Houses ===
==== Styles ====
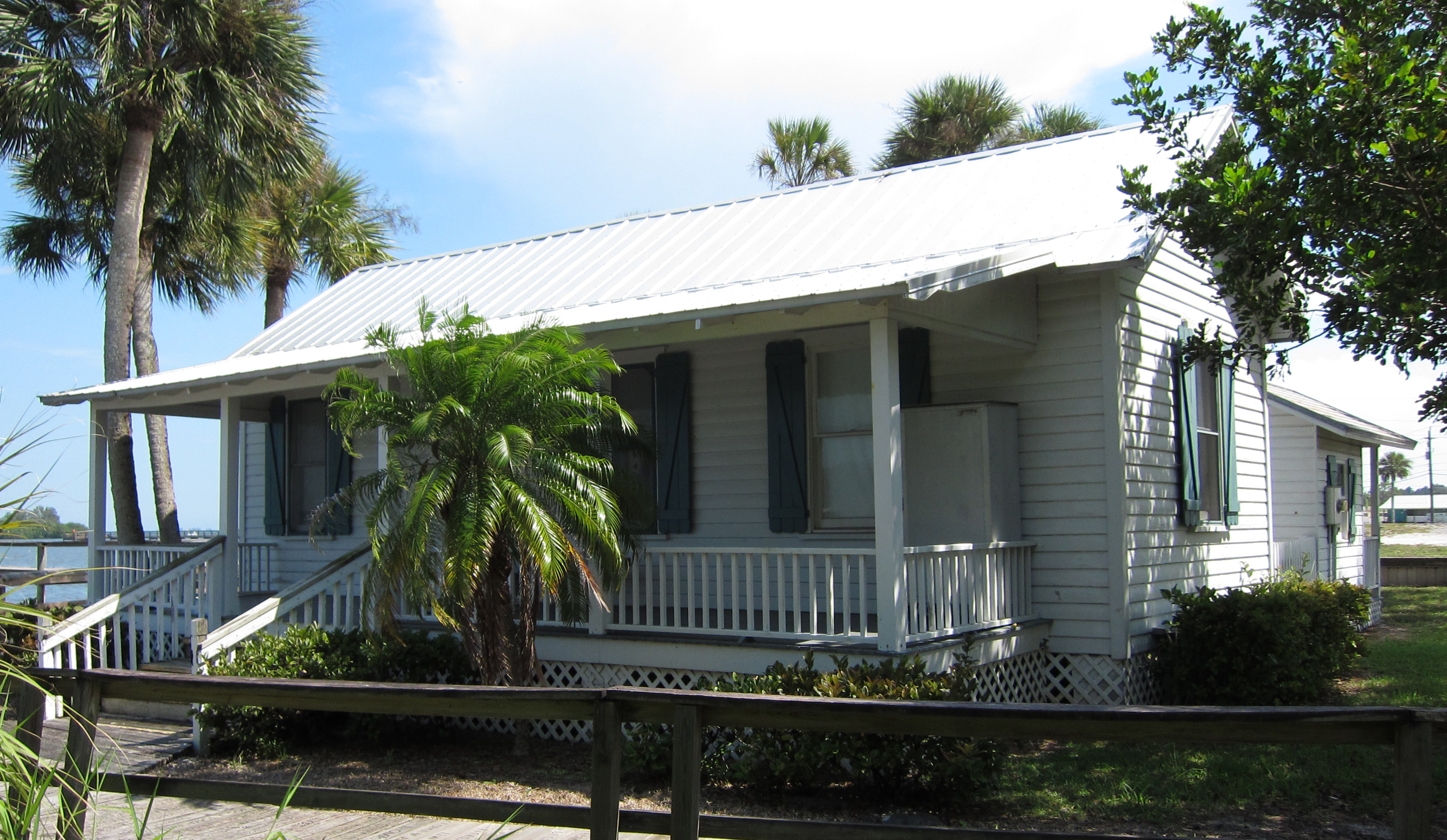
Florida cracker style house

One common home in the state is a cracker home. Historically, the cracker home is either a farmhouse, townhouse, or a plantation, and began appearing at the turn of the nineteenth century. Characteristics include wood-framed construction, a large front porch, horizontal wood siding in both the exterior and interior, an elevated first floor, a revealed fireplace, an overhang, and a steep roof. The cracker home was made to withstand Florida's harsh climates, and is known today for its energy efficiency. It is prevalent in Naples and North Florida. The home also allows for additional rooms to be attached to the house if needed, forming a compound.

In the Key West, houses also use the Caribbean housing style. Caribbean housing takes influence from The Bahamas and was prevalent from 1825 to the 1890s. It is made of wood and masonry, and characteristics include a courtyard, balcony, and a loggia.

Mediterranean Revival architecture is a housing style common in Palm Beach and Coral Gables. It is an adaptation of Spanish and Moorish architecture, and its popularity has kept it in practice.

Modern architecture is a vernacular style of housing that was in practice from the 1920s to the 1940s and was mainly common in Miami and Miami Beach. During this time, South Florida was embracing Art Deco architecture, and modern architecture consisted of metals, plastics, glass blocks, and glass panels.

Ranch-style architecture is another very popular architectural design in the state of Florida. The ranch style house is characterized by its large open floor plans, low roofs, and single story size. This was a very popular design in the 1920s to 1970s and commonly offered large garage space which appealed to the suburban housing ideals of the time.

Spanish Colonial Revival architecture was most popular from 1915 to 1930 and mainly embraced by Florida and California. This style of architecture is loosely based on colonial Mexico's style in the early 20th century and exhibits the trade mark bright stucco exterior and red roof tiles.

Pueblo Revival architecture often uses clay, concrete, or adobe as the primary building materials. This style is often identified by the darker earth tones such as the true tan clay or red adobe color pallets. The roofs of this style of home are usually flat and have curved designs around the interior and exterior trims.

==== Statistics ====
According to the 2019 American Community Survey, there are 9,674,053 housing units, with 7,905,832 being households and a 66.2% of housing ownership. Of those, 2,127,517 households are in Palm Beach, Broward, and Miami-Dade counties.

== History ==
The first major land boom was between 1782 and 1784, when British Loyalists fled following the American Revolutionary War and English population increased by 280%. In the 1920s, Florida was in the midst of high real estate activity, where the state saw inflated real estate values and many coming into the state eager for profits. The market for real estate reached a peak in 1925, with the 1926 Miami hurricane and Wall Street crash of 1929 forcing little development in the state and a land bust.

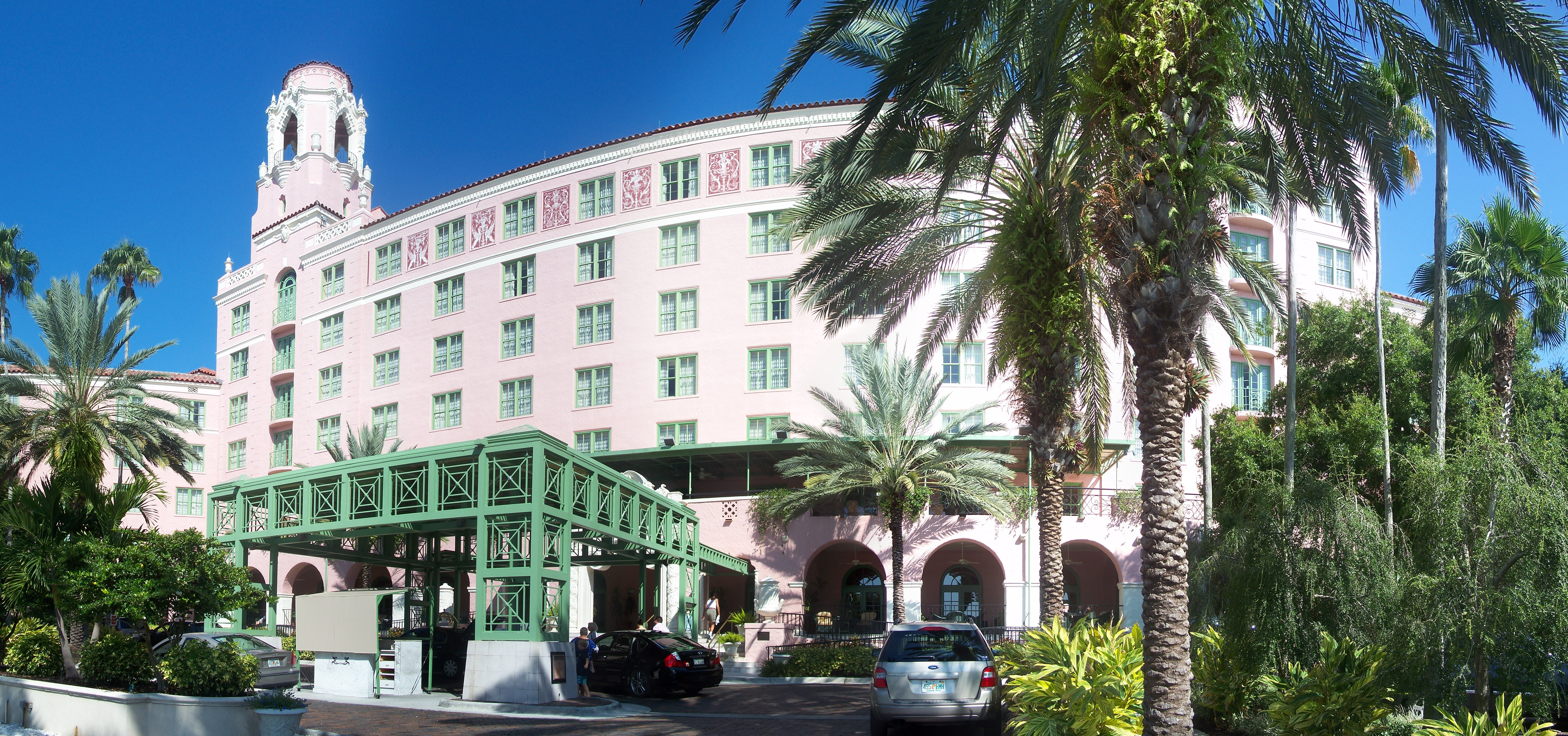
The Vinoy Park Hotel in St. Petersburg, Florida is an example of Mediterranean Revival architecture in the state.

During this time, hundreds of small Art Deco-styled apartments and hotels were constructed in the 1930s and 1940s, rebelling against the Mediterranean Revival style that persists to this day. Aviator Glenn Curtis introduced the Indian pueblo style of the American Southwest, which was heavily used in Country Club Estates. Land development continued through the post-war mid-1900s.

== Homelessness ==
From 2007 to 2020, Florida had the largest decrease in the number of homeless nationwide. In January 2019, the Department of Housing and Urban Development reported approximately 28,328 people were undergoing homelessness in Florida on any given day, a decrease of 8.7% from the previous year, or about 0.1% of the population. Of those, 5,729 were experiencing chronic homelessness and 2,472 were Veterans. In October 2011, Operation Sacred Trust was founded to assist homeless Veterans in Broward and Miami-Dade counties.

== See also ==
- Real estate in Florida
