= Oceanport School District =

School district in Monmouth County, New Jersey, US

Address
- 29 Wolfhill Avenue Oceanport, Monmouth County, New Jersey, 07757; United States
- Coordinates: 40.31273°N 74.017879°W

District information
- Grades: Pre-K to 8
- Superintendent: Karen Barry
- Business administrator: Geraldine Martinez
- Schools: 2

Students and staff
- Enrollment: 562 (as of 2021–22)
- Faculty: 65.0 FTEs
- Student–teacher ratio: 8.7:1

Other information
- District Factor Group: GH
- Website: www.oceanportschools.org
Ind.	Per pupil	District spending	Rank (*)	K-8 average	%± vs. average
1A	Total Spending	$18,807	37	$18,891	−0.4%
1	Budgetary Cost	14,441	33	14,159	2.0%
2	Classroom Instruction	8,674	34	8,659	0.2%
6	Support Services	2,637	52	2,167	21.7%
8	Administrative Cost	1,589	24	1,547	2.7%
10	Operations & Maintenance	1,250	16	1,612	−22.5%
13	Extracurricular Activities	283	61	104	172.1%
16	Median Teacher Salary	59,445	31	61,136
Data from NJDoE 2014 Taxpayers' Guide to Education Spending. *Of K-8 districts with 401-750 students. Lowest spending=1; Highest=64

The Oceanport School District is a community public school district that serves students in pre-kindergarten through eighth grade from Oceanport, in Monmouth County, in the U.S. state of New Jersey. The district also includes students from Sea Bright, a non-operating district that was subject to a mandatory merger with Oceanport in 2009.

As of the 2021–22 school year, the district, comprised of two schools, had an enrollment of 562 students and 65.0 classroom teachers (on an FTE basis), for a student–teacher ratio of 8.7:1.

The district had been classified by the New Jersey Department of Education as being in District Factor Group "GH", the third-highest of eight groupings. District Factor Groups organize districts statewide to allow comparison by common socioeconomic characteristics of the local districts. From lowest socioeconomic status to highest, the categories are A, B, CD, DE, FG, GH, I and J.

For ninth through twelfth grades, public school students attend Shore Regional High School, a regional high school that also serves students from the constituent districts of Monmouth Beach, Sea Bright and West Long Branch. The high school is located in West Long Branch and is part of the Shore Regional High School District. As of the 2021–22 school year, the high school had an enrollment of 613 students and 55.7 classroom teachers (on an FTE basis), for a student–teacher ratio of 11.0:1.

== Awards and recognition ==
During the 2009–10 school year, Maple Place Middle School was awarded the National Blue Ribbon School Award of Excellence by the United States Department of Education, the highest award an American school can receive.

== Schools ==
Schools in the district (with 2021–22 enrollment data from the National Center for Education Statistics) are:

- Wolf Hill Elementary School with 310 students in pre-Kindergarten through 4th grade
  - Mark Maglione, principal
- Maple Place Middle School with 248 students in grades 5–8
  - Melissa Keiser, principal

== Administration ==
Core members of the district's administration are:

- Karen Barry, superintendent
- Geraldine Martinez, business administrator and board secretary

== Board of education ==
The district's board of education, comprised of nine members, sets policy and oversees the fiscal and educational operation of the district through its administration. As a Type II school district, the board's trustees are elected directly by voters to serve three-year terms of office on a staggered basis, with three seats up for election each year held (since 2012) as part of the November general election. The board appoints a superintendent to oversee the district's day-to-day operations and a business administrator to supervise the business functions of the district.
