= Lead Industries Association =

Trade organisation

The Lead Industries Association (LIA) was a trade organization that in 1925 made it possible for tetraethyllead to be an additive of commercial gasoline and later incorporated in 1928 to promote the interests of the lead industry. The National Lead Institute was a predecessor of the Lead Industries Association. The association lobbied to lift bans on, and promote the use of, lead pipes. The association also promoted lead-based paints, which became the subject of a poisoning lawsuit filed against paint manufacturers. In 1958, the LIA and the American Zinc Institute founded an organization with a similar mission that outlasted the LIA, the International Lead Zinc Research Organization (ILZRO). In 2002, the Lead Industries Association of Sparta, NJ, went bankrupt and defunct citing that they were unable to get insurance to cover the litigation against them.

Richard Schweiker's 1972 testimony in the US Congressional record includes a transcript of a segment that aired January 28, 1972, on the NBC Chronolog program concerning lead poisoning. The ILZRO wrote a memo refuting information presented in that show.

The LIA unsuccessfully attempted to make Ronald G. Stevens of Long Island Film Studios remove statements about lead in gasoline and from industrial pollution affecting children regardless of socioeconomic status from a 10-minute film titled Lead Poisoning, The Hidden Epidemic that won a 1972 Silver Medal from the New York Film Festival.
