= Atlantic Highlands School District =

Defunct school district in Monmouth County, New Jersey, US

- Atlantic Highlands Elementary School, the only school in the district at the time of its existence

Address
- 140 First Avenue Atlantic Highlands, Monmouth County, New Jersey, 07716; United States
- Coordinates: 40.411343°N 74.038831°W

District information
- Grades: PreK-6
- Closed: July 2024
- Superintendent: Tara Beams
- Business administrator: Janet Sherlock
- Schools: 1

Students and staff
- Enrollment: 246 (as of 2023–24)
- Faculty: 30.0 FTEs
- Student–teacher ratio: 8.2:1

Other information
- District Factor Group: GH
- Website: ahes.tridistrict.org
Ind.	Per pupil	District spending	Rank (*)	K-6 average	%± vs. average
1A	Total Spending	$18,294	32	$18,891	−3.2%
1	Budgetary Cost	13,947	24	13,649	2.2%
2	Classroom Instruction	9,140	30	8,366	9.3%
6	Support Services	1,716	13	2,161	−20.6%
8	Administrative Cost	1,642	32	1,467	11.9%
10	Operations & Maintenance	1,266	11	1,552	−18.4%
13	Extracurricular Activities	52	26	39	33.3%
16	Median Teacher Salary	66,485	54	57,437
Data from NJDoE 2014 Taxpayers' Guide to Education Spending. *Of K-6 districts with any number of students. Lowest spending=1; Highest=59

The Atlantic Highlands School District was a community public school district that serves students in pre-kindergarten through sixth grade from Atlantic Highlands, in Monmouth County, in the U.S. state of New Jersey. The district was dissolved effective July 2024 with the merger of the Atlantic Highlands and Highlands districts into Henry Hudson Regional School District.

As of the 2023–24 school year, the district, comprised of one school, had an enrollment of 246 students and 30.0 classroom teachers (on an FTE basis), for a student–teacher ratio of 8.2:1.

The district had been classified by the New Jersey Department of Education as being in District Factor Group "GH", the third-highest of eight groupings. District Factor Groups organize districts statewide to allow comparison by common socioeconomic characteristics of the local districts. From lowest socioeconomic status to highest, the categories are A, B, CD, DE, FG, GH, I and J.

For seventh through twelfth grades, public school students attend Henry Hudson Regional High School, a comprehensive six-year high school and regional public school district that serves students from both Atlantic Highlands and Highlands. As of the 2023–24 school year, the high school had an enrollment of 302 students and 39.4 classroom teachers (on an FTE basis), for a student–teacher ratio of 7.7:1.

In September 2023, voters in both Atlantic Highlands and Highlands approved a ballot measure that would consolidate the two K–6 districts with the Henry Hudson regional district to form a single K–12 district starting in the 2024–25 school year.

== School ==
Atlantic Highlands Elementary School had an enrollment of 245 students in grades PreK-6 in the 2023–24 school year.

- Michael Ferrarese, principal

== Administration ==
Core members of the district's administration are:

- Tara Beams, superintendent
- Janet Sherlock, business administrator and board secretary

Beams had served jointly since June 2021 as Tri-District Superintendent of Schools for the Atlantic Highlands School District, the Highlands School District and the Henry Hudson Regional High School.

== Board of education ==
The district's board of education, comprised of nine members, set policy and oversees the fiscal and educational operation of the district through its administration. As a Type II school district, the board's trustees were elected directly by voters to serve three-year terms of office on a staggered basis, with three seats up for election each year held (since 2012) as part of the November general election. The board appointed a superintendent to oversee the district's day-to-day operations and a business administrator to supervise the business functions of the district.
