= Jersey Shore Arts Center =

Coordinates: 40.2130139°N 74.0160403°W

The Jersey Shore Arts Center (formerly Old Neptune High School) is a non-profit arts center in the Ocean Grove section of Neptune Township, New Jersey.

== History ==
In 1897, the property on which the building sits was leased to the Neptune Township Schools for the purpose of creating Neptune High School. Completed in 1898, by architect Ernest A. Arend (1876-1950), the then school had won an award at the 1906 World's Fair for its architectural splendor. The school opened in 1897, with Lida Doren serving as the state's first female principal and superintendent. The building was used until September 1960, when it was replaced by the district's existing high school building. The building had been used as a school up until the 1980s, after which the state of the building was allowed to decline.

The building remained empty up until 1994 when the Ocean Grove Historic Preservation Society led by Herbert Herbst and formed for the sole purpose of saving the building bought the building from the Board of Education for $1. In 1997, the Ocean Grove Historic Preservation Society, led by Herbert stepped in. The organization took title to the building, beginning an effort to save the badly damaged historic building and create a home for the cultural arts in the wider community.
