= Shark River Hills, New Jersey =

Populated place in Monmouth County, New Jersey, US

- Census-designated place
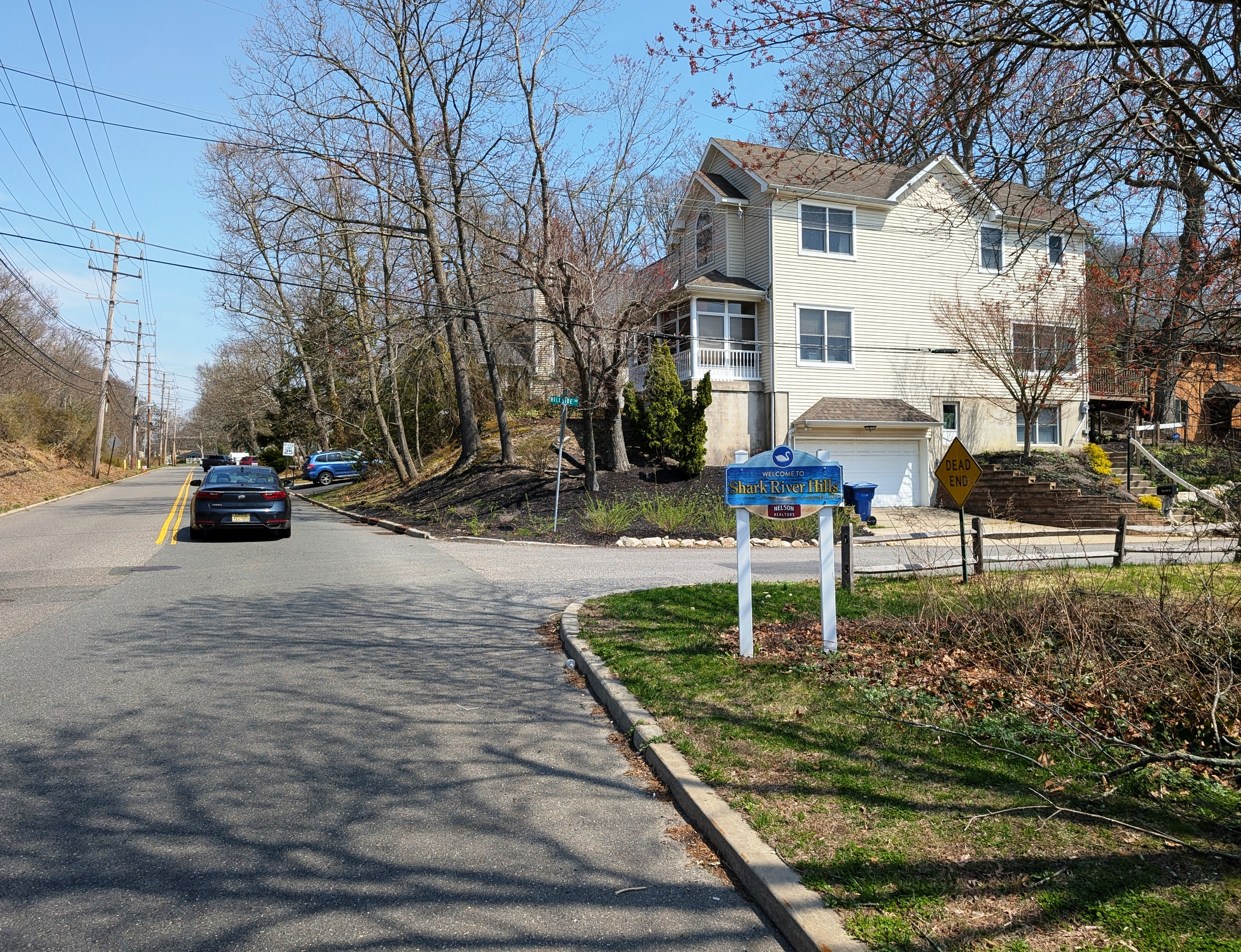
- Entering Shark River Hills on northbound Brighton Avenue
- Nickname: The Hills
- Map of Shark River Hills highlighted within Monmouth County. Right: Location of Monmouth County in New Jersey.

- Location in Monmouth County Location in New Jersey Location in the United States
- Coordinates: 40.193067°N 74.044461°W
- Country: United States
- State: New Jersey
- County: Monmouth
- Township: Neptune

Area
  - Total: 1.23 sq mi (3.18 km^{2})
  - Land: 0.86 sq mi (2.22 km^{2})
  - Water: 0.37 sq mi (0.96 km^{2}) 9.15%
- Elevation: 49 ft (15 m)

Population (2020)
  - Total: 3,583
  - Density: 4,183.1/sq mi (1,615.11/km^{2})
- Time zone: UTC−05:00 (Eastern (EST))
  - Summer (DST): UTC−04:00 (Eastern (EDT))
- ZIP Code: 07753 (Neptune)
- Area codes: 732/848
- FIPS code: 34-66840
- GNIS feature ID: 02390285

Shark River Hills is an unincorporated community and census-designated place (CDP) within Neptune Township, in Monmouth County, New Jersey, United States. As of the 2020 census, the CDP's population was 3,583.

== Geography ==
The community is in southeastern Monmouth County, in the southeastern part of Neptune Township. It is bordered to the northeast by Neptune City, to the southeast by Belmar, and to the southwest by Wall Township. The community sits on a wide peninsula that is bordered to the east and south by the Shark River estuary. The New Jersey Route 18 expressway forms the western border of the community, with access from New Jersey Route 33 where it touches the northernmost point of the CDP.

According to the U.S. Census Bureau, the Shark River Hills CDP has a total area of 1.23 square miles (3.19 km^{2}), including 0.86 square miles (2.23 km^{2}) of land and 0.37 square miles (0.96 km^{2}) of water (30.27%).

=== Climate ===
The climate in this area is characterized by hot, humid summers and generally mild to cool winters. According to the Köppen Climate Classification system, Shark River Hills has a humid subtropical climate, abbreviated "Cfa" on climate maps.

== Demographics ==
Historical population
Census	Pop.	Note	%±
1990	4,228		—
2000	3,878		−8.3%
2010	3,697		−4.7%
2020	3,583		−3.1%
Population sources: 1950 1960 1970; 1980 1990 2000; 2010 2020

Shark River Hills first appeared as a census designated place in the 1990 U.S. census.

=== Racial and ethnic composition ===
Shark River Hills CDP, New Jersey – Racial and ethnic composition Note: the US Census treats Hispanic/Latino as an ethnic category. This table excludes Latinos from the racial categories and assigns them to a separate category. Hispanics/Latinos may be of any race.
Race / Ethnicity (NH = Non-Hispanic)	Pop 2000	Pop 2010	Pop 2020	% 2000	% 2010	% 2020
White alone (NH)	3,739	3,495	3,195	96.42%	94.54%	89.17%
Black or African American alone (NH)	22	33	37	0.57%	0.89%	1.03%
Native American or Alaska Native alone (NH)	1	6	0	0.03%	0.16%	0.00%
Asian alone (NH)	30	40	52	0.77%	1.08%	1.45%
Native Hawaiian or Pacific Islander alone (NH)	1	1	0	0.03%	0.03%	0.00%
Other race alone (NH)	4	8	13	0.10%	0.22%	0.36%
Mixed race or Multiracial (NH)	33	11	128	0.85%	0.30%	3.57%
Hispanic or Latino (any race)	48	103	158	1.24%	2.79%	4.41%
Total	3,878	3,697	3,583	100.00%	100.00%	100.00%

=== 2020 census ===
As of the 2020 census, Shark River Hills had a population of 3,583. The median age was 50.2 years. 15.5% of residents were under the age of 18 and 23.3% of residents were 65 years of age or older. For every 100 females there were 96.7 males, and for every 100 females age 18 and over there were 93.5 males age 18 and over.

100.0% of residents lived in urban areas, while 0.0% lived in rural areas.

There were 1,491 households in Shark River Hills, of which 20.7% had children under the age of 18 living in them. Of all households, 59.0% were married-couple households, 13.5% were households with a male householder and no spouse or partner present, and 22.1% were households with a female householder and no spouse or partner present. About 23.2% of all households were made up of individuals and 12.0% had someone living alone who was 65 years of age or older.

There were 1,561 housing units, of which 4.5% were vacant. The homeowner vacancy rate was 1.3% and the rental vacancy rate was 5.6%.

=== 2010 census ===
The 2010 United States census counted 3,697 people, 1,511 households, and 1,065 families in the CDP. The population density was 4,149.9 people per square mile (1,602.3 people/km^{2}). There were 1,577 housing units at an average density of 1,770.2 units per square mile (683.5 units/km^{2}). The racial makeup was 96.51% (3,568) White, 0.89% (33) Black or African American, 0.19% (7) Native American, 1.11% (41) Asian, 0.03% (1) Pacific Islander, 0.54% (20) from other races, and 0.73% (27) from two or more races. Hispanic or Latino of any race were 2.79% (103) of the population.

Of the 1,511 households, 23.6% had children under the age of 18; 58.9% were married couples living together; 8.5% had a female householder with no husband present and 29.5% were non-families. Of all households, 22.3% were made up of individuals and 7.9% had someone living alone who was 65 years of age or older. The average household size was 2.45 and the average family size was 2.89.

18.7% of the population were under the age of 18, 5.1% from 18 to 24, 23.0% from 25 to 44, 38.7% from 45 to 64, and 14.5% who were 65 years of age or older. The median age was 46.8 years. For every 100 females, the population had 94.0 males. For every 100 females ages 18 and older there were 92.6 males.

=== 2000 census ===
As of the 2000 United States census there were 3,878 people, 1,509 households, and 1,106 families living in the CDP. The population density was 1,782.5 people/km^{2} (4,617 people/mi^{2}). There were 1,558 housing units at an average density of 716.1 units/km^{2} (1,855 units/mi^{2}). The racial makeup of the CDP was 97.40% White, 0.57% African American, 0.03% Native American, 0.80% Asian, 0.03% Pacific Islander, 0.28% from other races, and 0.90% from two or more races. Hispanic or Latino of any race were 1.24% of the population.

There were 1,509 households, out of which 30.6% had children under the age of 18 living with them, 62.7% were married couples living together, 8.1% had a female householder with no husband present, and 26.7% were non-families. 21.5% of all households were made up of individuals, and 7.0% had someone living alone who was 65 years of age or older. The average household size was 2.57 and the average family size was 3.03.

In the CDP the population was spread out, with 22.3% under the age of 18, 5.5% from 18 to 24, 30.8% from 25 to 44, 28.4% from 45 to 64, and 13.0% who were 65 years of age or older. The median age was 41 years. For every 100 females, there were 94.5 males. For every 100 females age 18 and over, there were 92.7 males.

The median income for a household in the CDP was $68,508, and the median income for a family was $71,591. Males had a median income of $57,950 versus $35,938 for females. The per capita income for the CDP was $31,196. About 1.4% of families and 1.9% of the population were below the poverty line, including none of those under age 18 and 7.9% of those age 65 or over.

=== Education ===
The Neptune Township Schools serve students in pre-kindergarten through twelfth grade from Shark River Hills and the entire township. Shark River Hills Elementary School, founded in 1956, is the only school in the community.

== See also ==
- Shark River Park, west of the CDP
