= Neptune City School District =

School district in Monmouth County, New Jersey, US

Coordinates: 40.196604°N 74.027779°W

Address
- 210 West Sylvania Avenue Neptune City, Monmouth County, New Jersey, 07753; United States

District information
- Grades: K-8
- Superintendent: Raymond J. Boccuti
- Business administrator: Mindy Green
- Schools: 1

Students and staff
- Enrollment: 272 (as of 2022–23)
- Faculty: 29.0 FTEs
- Student–teacher ratio: 9.4:1

Other information
- District Factor Group: CD
- Website: www.neptunecityschool.org
Ind.	Per pupil	District spending	Rank (*)	K-8 average	%± vs. average
1A	Total Spending	$15,593	5	$18,891	−17.5%
1	Budgetary Cost	10,924	6	14,159	−22.8%
2	Classroom Instruction	6,926	9	8,659	−20.0%
6	Support Services	1,298	4	2,167	−40.1%
8	Administrative Cost	1,473	18	1,547	−4.8%
10	Operations & Maintenance	1,055	5	1,612	−34.6%
13	Extracurricular Activities	170	41	104	63.5%
16	Median Teacher Salary	49,640	7	61,136
Data from NJDoE 2014 Taxpayers' Guide to Education Spending. *Of K-8 districts with up to 400 students. Lowest spending=1; Highest=71

The Neptune City School District is a community public school district that serves students in kindergarten through eighth grade from Neptune City, in Monmouth County, in the U.S. state of New Jersey.

As of the 2022–23 school year, the district, comprised of one school, had an enrollment of 272 students and 29.0 classroom teachers (on an FTE basis), for a student–teacher ratio of 9.4:1.

The district is classified by the New Jersey Department of Education as being in District Factor Group "CD", the sixth-highest of eight groupings. District Factor Groups organize districts statewide to allow comparison by common socioeconomic characteristics of the local districts. From lowest socioeconomic status to highest, the categories are A, B, CD, DE, FG, GH, I and J.

Public school students in ninth through twelfth grades attend Neptune High School as part of a sending/receiving relationship with the Neptune Township Schools; in a study published in May 2015, the district looked at modifying its relationship with the Neptune Township district, considering leaving the agreement unchanged, adding students in grades 6–8 to the sending arrangement or a regionalization of the two districts. As of the 2021–22 school year, the high school had an enrollment of 1,212 students and 97.0 classroom teachers (on an FTE basis), for a student–teacher ratio of 12.5:1.

The district also provides students with the opportunities to attend other high schools, including the Monmouth County Vocational School District Academies which include: the Marine Academy of Science and Technology (MAST) located on Sandy Hook, High Technology High School located on the campus of Brookdale Community College in Lincroft, the Academy of Allied Health & Science in Neptune Township and affiliated with the Jersey Shore University Medical Center, the Communications High School located on the property of Wall High School, and the new Biotechnology High School located in Freehold Township. Students also have the opportunity to attend the Performing Arts Program at Red Bank Regional High School for Performing Arts in Little Silver or the Academy of Information Technology and the Academy of Finance both located at the Red Bank Regional High School.

== School ==
Woodrow Wilson School served students in pre-kindergarten through eighth grade. The school had 227 students as of the 2021–22 school year.

== Administration ==
Core members of the district's administration are:

- Raymond J. Boccuti, chief school administrator / principal
- Mindy Green, business administrator and board secretary

== Board of education ==
The district's board of education, composed of nine members, sets policy and oversees the fiscal and educational operation of the district through its administration. As a Type II school district, the board's trustees are elected directly by voters to serve three-year terms of office on a staggered basis, with three seats up for election each year held (since 2012) as part of the November general election. The board appoints a superintendent to oversee the district's day-to-day operations and a business administrator to supervise the business functions of the district.
