= Richard R. Behn =

American admiral

- Rear Admiral Richard R. Behn, NOAA
- Military career
- Allegiance: United States of America
- Branch: NOAA Commissioned Officer Corps
- Service years: 1978 - 2007
- Rank: Rear Admiral (lower half)
- Commands: NOAA's Marine and Aviation Operations Centers; NOAA's Deputy Under Secretary of Commerce
- Awards: Department of Commerce Bronze Medal; NOAA Corps Commendation Medal; NOAA Corps Special Achievement Award

Richard R. Behn, is a retired one-star rear admiral of the National Oceanic and Atmospheric Administration Commissioned Officer Corps who served as director of the National Oceanic and Atmospheric Administration's Marine and Aviation Operations Centers (part of NOAA's Office of Marine and Aviation Operations (OMAO)), from August 2004 to September 2007. He was nominated for this position by President George W. Bush, confirmed by the Senate, and subsequently promoted to rear admiral (lower half) in August 2004.

As director, Behn was responsible for the safe operations of NOAA's aircraft and ships, as well as the management of OMAO's operations center's $100M budget and more than 500 fleet personnel. The Aircraft Operations Center, located in Tampa, Florida, on MacDill Air Force Base, oversees NOAA's fixed-wing aircraft, including the renowned NOAA "hurricane hunters." The Marine Operations Centers, located in Norfolk, Virginia, and Seattle, Washington, oversee NOAA's multipurpose oceanographic research, fisheries research, and hydrographic survey vessels. Port offices are located in Woods Hole, Massachusetts; Charleston, South Carolina; Pascagoula, Mississippi; San Diego, California; Honolulu, Hawaii; and Kodiak and Ketchikan, Alaska.

From 2013 to 2018, Behn served as the Director, Marine Operations at the University of Miami's Rosenstiel School of Marine & Atmospheric Science in Miami, Florida.

Today, Behn provides consulting services to the maritime industry, more particular, the research vessel community.

== Career ==
Behn was a commissioned officer in the NOAA Corps from 1978 to 2007. He had the opportunity to work for most of NOAA's line and staff offices. He served aboard NOAA's oceanographic and fisheries research ships, sailing the waters from the Arctic to the Antarctic, in both the Pacific and Atlantic Oceans. His last sea tour was aboard NOAA Ship McArthur as commanding officer.

Behn's shore tours included a variety of administrative and management positions, all with increasing responsibility. Prior to his promotion to rear admiral, he was the executive director to NOAA's Deputy Under Secretary of Commerce, where he assisted in managing NOAA employees nationwide along with the agency's multibillion-dollar budget. Other assignments include executive officer to NOAA's chief scientist and executive director of the Office of Marine and Aviation Operations.

Behn served as the co-chair of NOAA's Unmanned Aircraft Systems Steering Committee; member of NOAA's Autonomous Underwater Vehicle Steering Committee; NOAA's representative on the Federal Oceanographic Facilities Committee; acting chairman of NOAA's Incentive Awards Board, NOAA's Diversity Council and NOAA's Equal Employment Opportunity Council. He led NOAA's nationwide 30th Anniversary efforts and chaired the Department of Commerce's Combined Federal Campaign as the world's third largest campaign in 1998 raising more than $2.5 million in contributions.

Behn is a lifetime member of the Military Officers Association of America, the Reserve Officers Association, and the National Military Family Association.

== Accomplishments ==
Behn holds a bachelor's degree in physical oceanography from Rutgers University. While in NOAA he was selected to attend the Excellence in Government Fellows Program and the Federal Executive Institute. As a NOAA Corps officer he was awarded the Department of Commerce Bronze Medal, NOAA Corps Commendation Medals, NOAA Corps Special Achievement Awards, and NOAA Corps Director's ribbons.

Upon retiring from NOAA, Behn and his family established and opened an Italian restaurant in Cape Coral, Florida. After three years of operations, the family sold the restaurant.

Behn then spent five years with the University of Miami as their Director, Marine Operations. He now provides consultation services to the maritime industry.

== Personal life ==
Behn is a native of Neptune Township, New Jersey and graduated from Neptune High School. He and his wife, the former Alisa Nadean Benincasa of Stockton, California, currently reside in Florida.

== Sources ==
- Biography of Richard R. Behn
