= Shark River Inlet =

Coordinates: 40°11′13″N 74°00′29″W

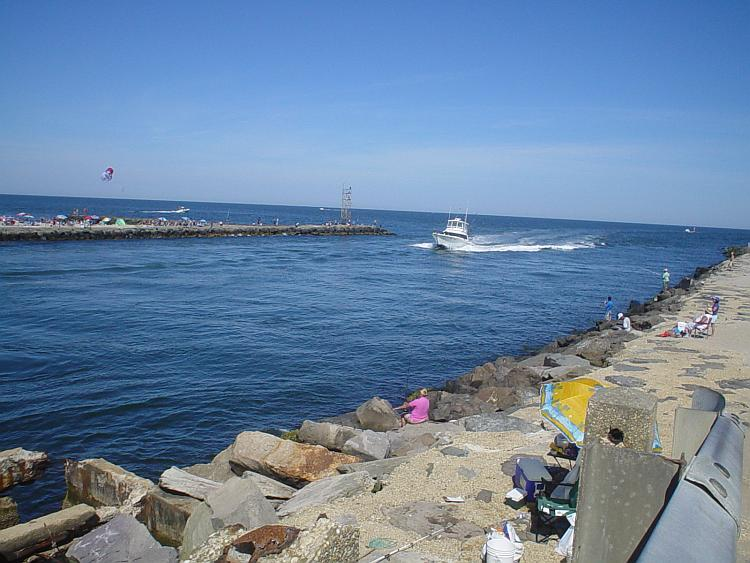
A boat travels back to the docks as visitors fish.

The Shark River Inlet is an inlet that connects the Atlantic Ocean with the Shark River, located entirely in Monmouth County, New Jersey, United States. The Shark River Inlet acts as a border between the towns of Belmar and Avon-by-the-Sea at the Atlantic Ocean. The Shark River Inlet is the only river inlet exclusively in Monmouth County that drains directly into the Atlantic Ocean; the Shrewsbury and Navesink rivers drain into Sandy Hook Bay (part of the much larger Lower New York Bay), and the Manasquan River is shared with Ocean County.

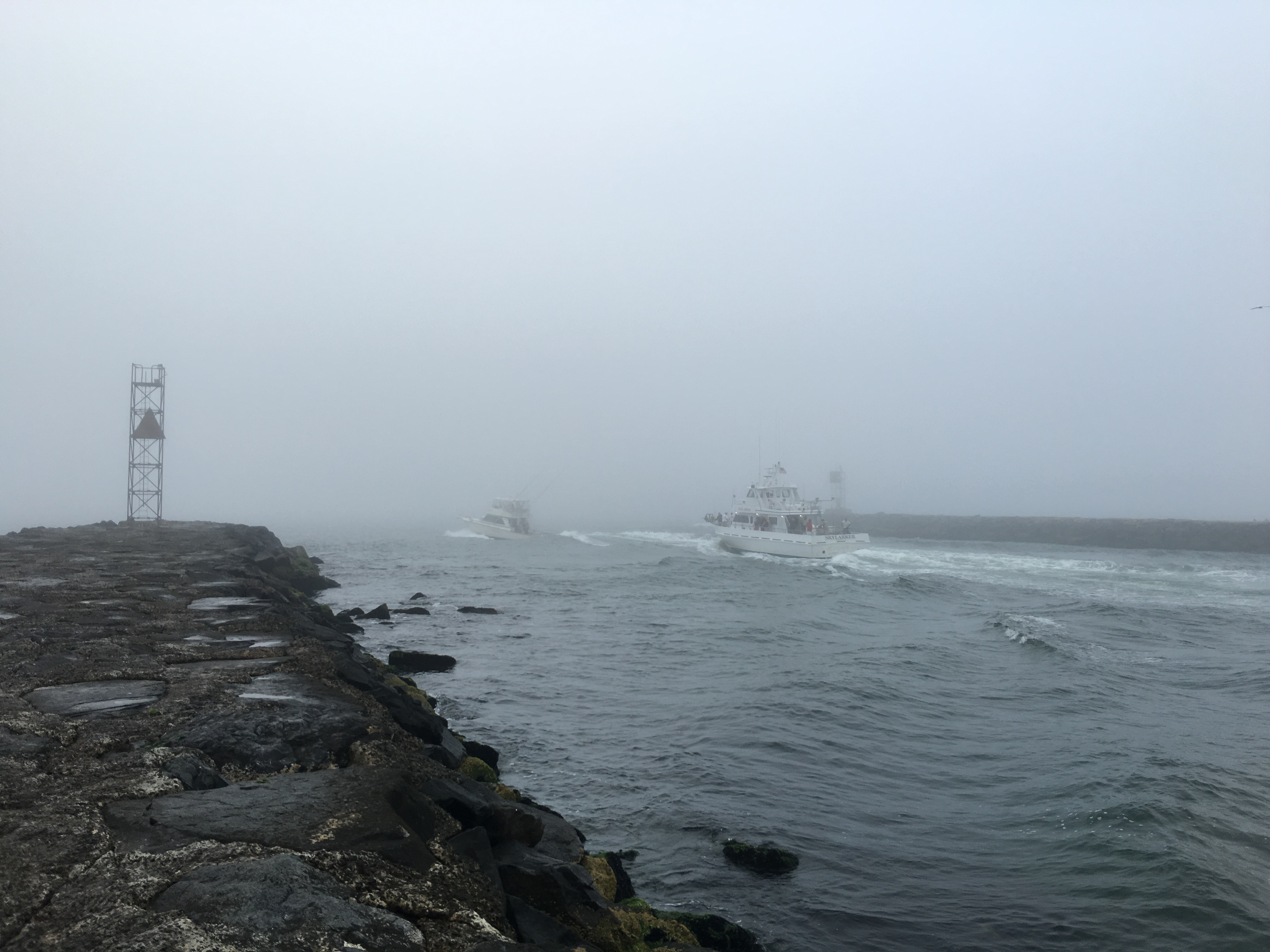
Charter boats leave the inlet on a foggy summer morning.

The inlet provides access to a marina where commercial, charter, and private fishing boats are moored.

== History ==
Despite its name, sharks swimming in the Shark River Inlet are a rare occurrence. The origin of the name Shark River is unknown. Some locals will claim the inlet got its name from a shark found in the river during the 1800s, while others believe the name is from the shark teeth commonly found upstream. The bridge above the estuary was constructed in 1933, costing around $400,000 to build. The electric powered bridge is lifted several times a day to let boats pass through it.

== Activities ==
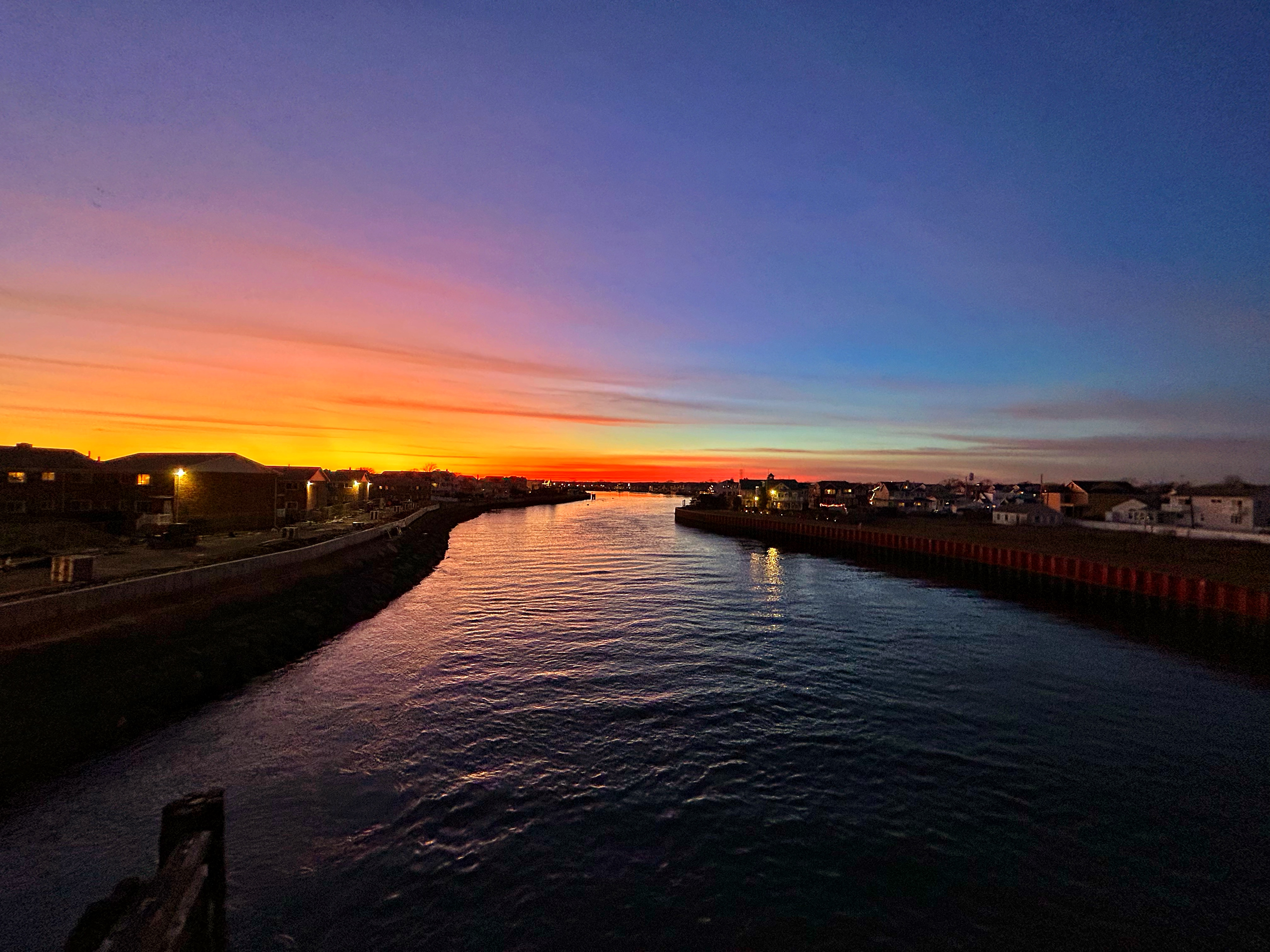
Sunset on the Shark River Inlet looking west from the drawbridge.

The inlet is also a popular fishing spot, often used to catch blue fish and stripers. During the summer months, fishermen can be found at the inlet from sunrise to sundown. Divers also use the inlet to spearfish.

Swimming in the inlet is not advised due to its dangerous currents and rough waters. Many people have lost their lives in the river as a result of swimming. If one is interested in diving at the inlet, they should consult the New Jersey Scuba diving site to read up on reports. Diving is also restricted from 8:00 AM – 5:30 PM from October 1 to May 1.

On July 6, 2008 a small four seater plane crashed into a shallow area of water in Shark River. The single occupant was killed immediately on impact.
