= Shark River Park =

Coordinates: 40.201772°N 74.091689°W

- Interactive map of Shark River Park
- Type: Suburban park
- Location: Monmouth County, New Jersey
- Area: 946 acres (383 ha)
- Created: 1961
- Operator: Monmouth County Park System
- Status: Open all year
- Parking: Three parking areas
- Website: http://www.monmouthcountyparks.com

Shark River Park is a suburban park located in the townships of Neptune, Wall and Tinton Falls in coastal New Jersey and is part of the Monmouth County Park System.

The initial park land was established in 1961 with a purchase of 946 acres (383 ha) of land used for construction staging during the building of the Garden State Parkway, becoming Monmouth County's first county owned park. The park is bisected by the Shark River from which the park gets its name and is the source of fossils for local elementary school field trips where students search the river gravel for prehistoric shark's teeth.

== Activities and facilities ==
The park's developed recreational offerings include fishing (with permit), picnic areas, playgrounds and a shelter building. There are 8.3 miles (13.4 km) of hiking trails.

The park has three entrance/parking areas, Main/Schoolhouse Road entrance, Gully Road entrance and Hillside parking area

== Trails ==
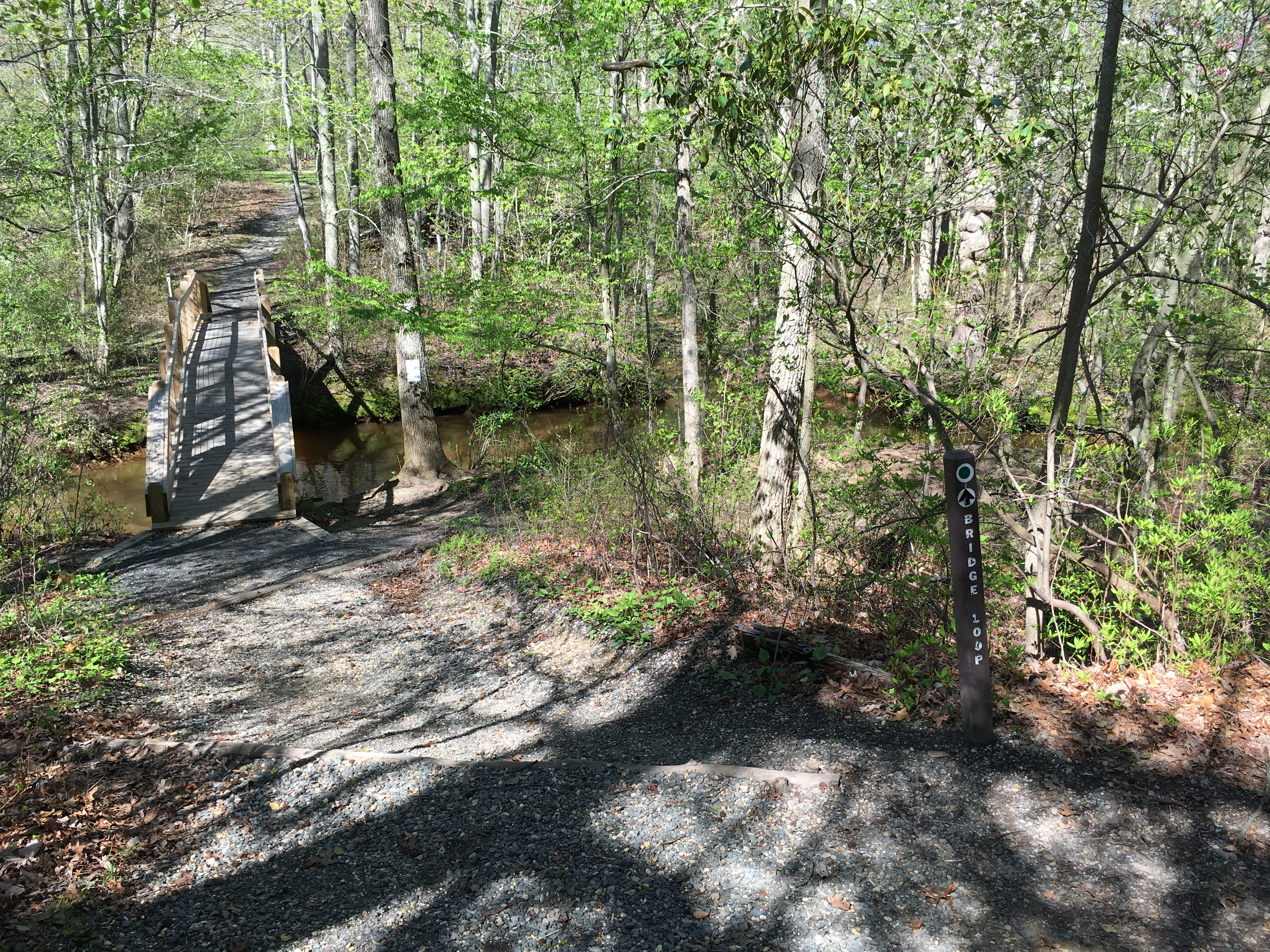
Bridge Loop Trail going over the Shark River in the northwest corner of the park

The park hosts seven trails of varying difficulty:

- Bridge loop .4 mile
- Cedar loop 1.2 mile
- Fitness trail
- Hidden Creek 2 mile
- Pine Hills 1.4 mile
- Shark River run 2.4 mile
- Rivers Edge 1 mile
