= Robert Lee Watt =

- Born: January 15, 1948 (age 78); Neptune Township, New Jersey
- Genre: Classical
- Instrument: French horn
- Formerly of: Los Angeles Philharmonic

Robert Lee Watt (born January 15, 1948) is an American horn player and the first African-American French hornist hired by a major symphony orchestra in the United States.

== Biography ==
Born in Neptune Township, New Jersey, his father was a jazz trumpet player who did not approve of his choice of instrument—feeling Watt's background and race would make a career with the horn impossible. Nevertheless, Watt won a scholarship to the New England Conservatory of Music in Boston and continued studies at California Institute of the Arts.

In 1970 at the age of twenty-two he was hired by Zubin Mehta and the Los Angeles Philharmonic to play assistant principal horn where he remained for 37 years before retiring in 2008.
