= Cory Nelms =

American football player (born 1988)

No. 32, 23, 38
- Position: Cornerback

Personal information
- Born: February 27, 1988 (age 38); Neptune Township, New Jersey, U.S.
- Listed height: 6 ft 0 in (1.83 m)
- Listed weight: 195 lb (88 kg)

Career information
- High school: Neptune (New Jersey)
- College: Miami (FL)
- NFL draft: 2011: undrafted

Career history
- San Francisco 49ers (2011)*; Oakland Raiders (2012)
- * Offseason or practice squad member only
- Stats at Pro Football Reference

Cory Nelms (born February 27, 1988) is an American former professional football cornerback who played for the Oakland Raiders of the National Football League (NFL). He played college football at the University of Miami. He was also a member of the San Francisco 49ers.

== Early life ==
Nelms participated in football and track and field at Neptune High School in Neptune Township, New Jersey.

== College career ==
Nelms played for the Miami Hurricanes from 2007 to 2010. He was also a member of the Hurricanes' track and field team. Nelms won the 2009 ACC Indoor Championship in the 60m hurdles and the 2010 ACC Outdoor Championship in the 110m hurdles.

== Professional career ==
Nelms was rated the 41st best free safety in the 2011 NFL draft by NFLDraftScout.com. He signed with the San Francisco 49ers on July 27, 2011 after going undrafted. He was released by the 49ers on September 3 and signed to the team's practice squad on September 4, 2011. He was signed to a futures contract by the 49ers on January 24, 2012. Nelms was released by the 49ers on August 27, 2012.

On November 19, 2012, Nelms was signed to the practice squad of the Oakland Raiders. He was promoted to the active roster on December 28, 2012. He appeared in one game for the Raiders on December 30, 2012 against the San Diego Chargers. He was released by the Raiders on August 25, 2013.

== Post-playing career ==
Nelms later became an assistant track coach at the University of Miami. In 2025, he joined the Colorado Buffaloes football team as an assistant strength and conditioning coach.
