= Neptune High School =

High school in Monmouth County, New Jersey, US

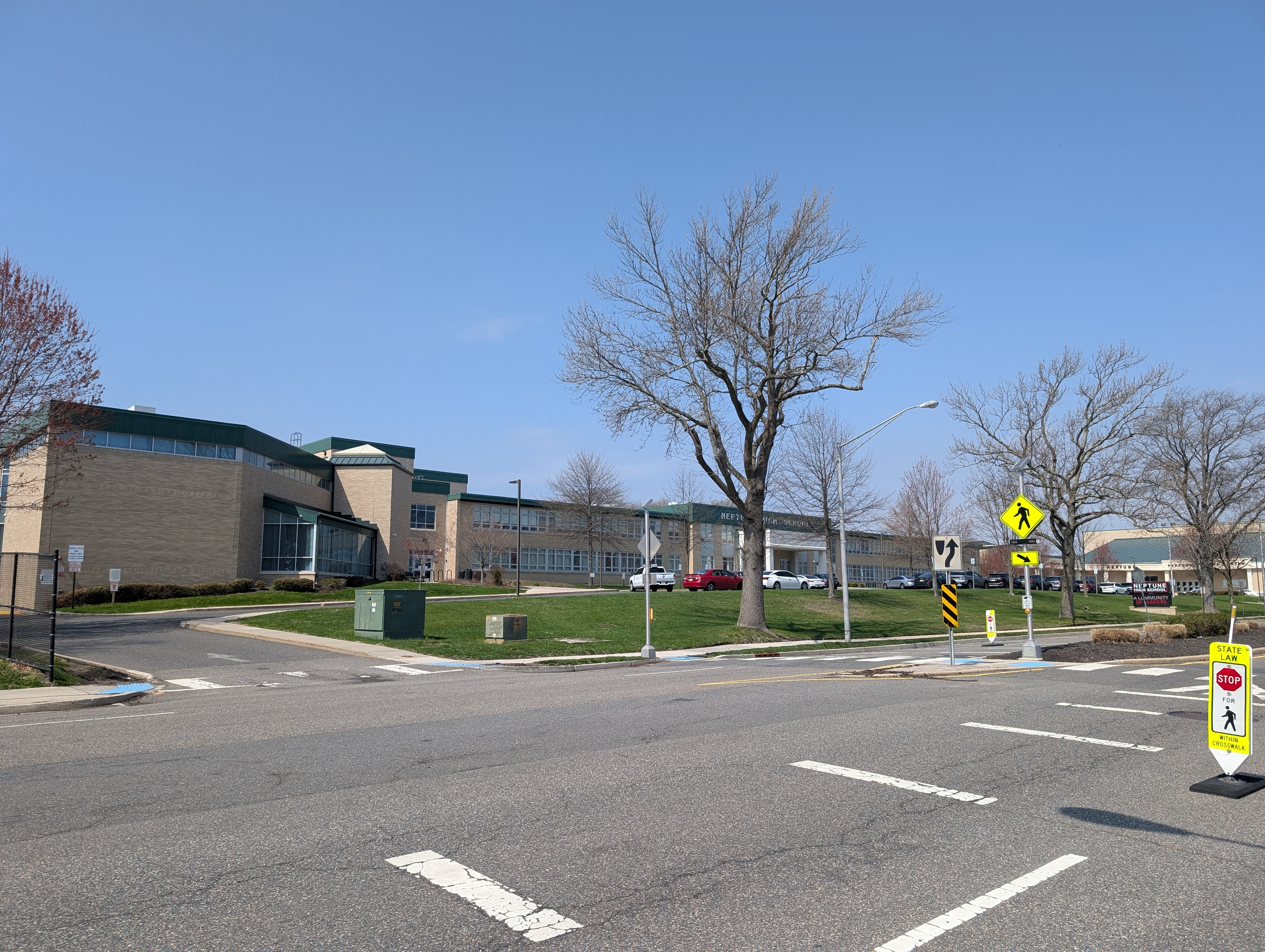

Location
- 55 Neptune Boulevard; Neptune Township, Monmouth County, New Jersey, New Jersey 07753; United States; 40.211755°N 74.035734°W"

Information
- School type: Public high school
- Motto: School of Excellence and No Excuses
- Established: 1897
- School district: Neptune Township Schools
- NCES School ID: 341116004032
- Principal: Tom Decker
- Faculty: 87.0 FTEs
- Grades: 9-12
- Enrollment: 1,129 (as of 2024–25)
- Student to teacher ratio: 13.0:1
- Colors: Red; Black
- Athletics conference: Shore Conference
- Mascot: King Neptune
- Team name: Scarlet Fliers
- Rivals: Asbury Park High School; Long Branch High School; Lakewood High School
- Accreditation: Middle States Association of Colleges and Schools
- Newspaper: The Blazer
- Yearbook: Trident
- Website: hs.neptuneschools.org

Neptune High School is a comprehensive four-year community public high school that serves students in ninth through twelfth grades from Neptune Township, in Monmouth County, in the U.S. state of New Jersey, operating as part of the Neptune Township Schools. Neptune Township Schools is one of New Jersey's 31 former Abbott districts. The school has been accredited by the Middle States Association of Colleges and Schools Commission on Elementary and Secondary Schools since 1929.

As of the 2024–25 school year, the school had an enrollment of 1,129 students and 87.0 classroom teachers (on an FTE basis), for a student–teacher ratio of 13.0:1. There were 616 students (54.6% of enrollment) eligible for free lunch and 131 (11.6% of students) eligible for reduced-cost lunch.

Public school students in ninth through twelfth grades from Neptune City attend Neptune High School as part of a sending/receiving relationship with the Neptune City School District; in a study published in May 2015, the district looked at modifying its relationship with the Neptune Township district, considering leaving the agreement unchanged, adding students in grades 6–8 to the sending arrangement or a regionalization of the two districts.

== History ==
Neptune High School was established in 1897 when the Ocean Grove Camp Meeting Association leased land at Main Street and Main Avenue in Ocean Grove to the Neptune Township Board of Education for educational purposes. The original building, completed in 1898, was designed by local architect Ernest A. Arend, and it was notable for its distinctive Romanesque architecture.

Lida Doren served as the school's first principal and superintendent, making her the first woman in New Jersey to hold both positions simultaneously at a public high school. The school received architectural acclaim, including an award at the 1906 World's Fair. The building served as the township’s main high school until the current facility opened on Neptune Boulevard in September 1960, and now exists as the Jersey Shore Arts Center.

The school’s mascot and nickname also carry historical significance. “Scarlet Fliers” was coined in 1928 by student journalist James Lawrence Ogle in reference to the basketball team’s red uniforms and fast-paced play. King Neptune became the school’s official symbol during the same period, representing strength and knowledge. Although a red-tailed hawk was briefly used as a mascot in the early 2000s, the King Neptune emblem was formally reinstated in 2005.

== Awards, recognition and rankings ==
Neptune High School has appeared in multiple rankings of New Jersey public high schools over the years.

In New Jersey Monthly magazine’s most recent published rankings in September 2014, Neptune High School was listed as the 292nd-ranked public high school out of 339 statewide, based on a revised evaluation methodology. Previous rankings include:

- 283rd out of 328 schools in 2012,
- 268th out of 316 schools in 2008,
- 221st out of 316 schools in 2006.

In addition, Niche publishes annual school evaluations based on academics, diversity, athletics, and student/parent reviews. As of 2025, Neptune High School received the following rankings:

- 28th out of 444 in "Most Diverse Public High Schools in New Jersey"
- 248th out of 525 in "Best High Schools for Athletes in New Jersey"

== Athletics ==
The Neptune High School Scarlet Fliers compete in Division B North of the Shore Conference, an athletic conference comprised of public and private high schools in Monmouth and Ocean counties along the Jersey Shore. The league operates under the jurisdiction of the New Jersey State Interscholastic Athletic Association (NJSIAA). With 970 students in grades 10–12, the school was classified by the NJSIAA for the 2019–20 school year as Group III for most athletic competition purposes, which included schools with an enrollment of 761 to 1,058 students in that grade range. The school was classified by the NJSIAA as Group III South for football for 2024–2026, which included schools with 695 to 882 students.

The boys' track team won the Group II spring / outdoor track state championship in 1939 and 1940 (as co-champion).

The boys' track team won the indoor track Group IV state championship in 1974 and 1976. The girls team won the Group IV championship in 1987 (as co-champion), the Group II titles in 1995-96 and the Group III title in 2009 (co-champion).

In 1976, the boys' track team won the Group IV state indoor relay championship. The girls team won the Group III title in 1996.

The boys track team won the winter track Meet of Champions in 1976.

The 1980 boys' soccer team finished the season with a record of 21-3 after winning the program's first Group IV state championship, defeating Columbia High School in the tournament final at Mercer County Park by the score of 3–1.

The girls' basketball team won the Group IV state championships in 1984 against Plainfield High School, and won the Group III title in 2010 (vs. Pascack Valley High School) and 2011 (vs. Teaneck High School). The girls' basketball team won the 2011 state championship, topping St. John Vianney High School by a score of 67–48 in the finals of the Tournament of Champions in a game played at the Izod Center, earning the first ToC championship for the school and for any school in the Shore Conference.

The field hockey team won the Central Jersey Group IV state sectional title in 1984 and 1986, and won the Group IV state championship in 1986.

The girls' spring track team was the Group IV state champion in 1987 and 2012.

=== Football ===
The Neptune High School football team has a longstanding tradition of competition in the Shore Conference and the New Jersey State Interscholastic Athletic Association (NJSIAA). The Scarlet Fliers have won the Central Jersey Group III state sectional title four times: in 1995, 1997, 1998, and most recently in 2011.

In 2011, Neptune completed an undefeated season and captured the sectional title with a 22–14 victory over Steinert High School. The team was noted for its strong defensive performance throughout the season.

Since the 2011 championship, the football program has experienced mixed results. While the team has remained a competitive presence within its division, it has not returned to a sectional final. The program continues to emphasize player development and community involvement.

The team also participates in one of New Jersey's historic Thanksgiving Day rivalries, facing Asbury Park High School annually. This matchup is among the longest-standing holiday football traditions in the state.

=== Boys' basketball ===
The Neptune High School boys' basketball team has a storied history, securing multiple NJSIAA state championships across different group classifications.

In 1949, the team captured the Group II state championship, defeating Merchantville High School 47–45 in the semifinals and Millburn High School 62–59 in the final.

In 1981, Neptune went undefeated, finishing with a 29–0 record and claiming the Group IV title with a 60–55 win over Malcolm X Shabazz High School at Princeton University's Jadwin Gymnasium.

The 2002 team won the Group III championship with an 84–58 win over Weequahic High School at the Louis Brown Athletic Center. They advanced to the Tournament of Champions, where they defeated East Side High School 71–63 in the semifinals before falling 69–49 to St. Anthony High School in the final at Continental Airlines Arena, finishing the season 29–3.

The 2009 team captured another Group III title, defeating Teaneck High School by a score of 74–52 at the Rutgers Athletic Center. They advanced to the Tournament of Champions and lost to Lenape High School 41–40 in the first round.

In recent years, Neptune has remained a competitive Shore Conference program under head coach Joe Fagan. The 2023–24 season was challenging, ending with a 1–20 overall record and a 0–6 mark in the Shore – B Coastal division. The 2024–25 season marked a turnaround, with the team finishing 14–10 overall and 5–5 in the Shore – B Central division, qualifying for the NJSIAA Central Jersey Group 3 playoffs before being eliminated in the first round by Hopewell Valley Central High School.

== Administration ==
The principal of Neptune High School is Tom Decker, who has more than 23 years of experience in the Neptune Township School District. In 2023, he was recognized as the New Jersey Principals and Supervisors Association (NJPSA) Visionary Assistant Principal of the Year.

The administrative team includes three vice principals.

== Student demographics and academic performance ==
As of the 2023–24 academic year, Neptune High School enrolled 1,102 students in grades 9 through 12, with a student–teacher ratio of approximately 12:1. The school's student body is notably diverse, with the following racial and ethnic composition:

- Black or African American: 39.4%
- Hispanic or Latino: 39.9%
- White (non-Hispanic): 17.5%
- Asian or Pacific Islander: 2.9%
- American Indian or Alaska Native: 0.3%

Approximately 34.2% of students are considered economically disadvantaged, with 28.8% eligible for free lunch and 5.3% for reduced-price lunch.

In terms of academic performance, state assessment results indicate that 8% of students achieved proficiency in mathematics, and 25% in reading/language arts, both below the New Jersey state averages. The school's average SAT score is 1100, with an average of 550 in both math and verbal sections. The average ACT score is 22.

The graduation rate at Neptune High School stands at 66%. Advanced Placement (AP) course participation is at 7%, with a 59% pass rate among those taking AP exams. The school offers nine AP courses, though enrollment in AP math and science courses is notably low.

== Notable alumni ==
- Lynn Ahrens (born 1948, class of 1966), writer and lyricist for the musical theatre, television and film
- Jack Armstrong (born 1965), former Major League Baseball pitcher
- Pat Battle (born 1959, class of 1977), WNBC-TV's New Jersey Bureau Reporter, Saturday Today (NBC) in New York co-anchor and occasional fill-in anchor
- Richard R. Behn, retired one-star rear admiral of the National Oceanic and Atmospheric Administration Commissioned Officer Corps
- John Best (born 1971), former professional basketball player
- Scott "Bam Bam" Bigelow (1961–2007), professional wrestler
- Vinny Curry (born 1988), defensive end for the Philadelphia Eagles
- Bob Davis (born 1945; class of 1963), former NFL quarterback whose career included three seasons with the New York Jets
- Dan Gonzalez (born 1974), American player of gridiron football
- Jake Jones (born 1949; class of 1967), former NBA player for the Philadelphia 76ers and Cincinnati Royals
- Keith Kirkwood (born 1993, class of 2013), wide receiver for the New Orleans Saints of the National Football League
- Harry Larrison Jr. (1926-2005, class of 1945), politician who served on the Monmouth County Board of Chosen Freeholders for nearly 39 years, marking the longest tenure of a Freeholder in New Jersey history
- Vini Lopez (born 1949, class of 1967), drummer who backed Bruce Springsteen in several bands, including Steel Mill and the E Street Band between 1968 and 1974
- Cory Nelms (born 1988), NFL player
- Joseph A. Palaia (1927-2016), politician who served in the New Jersey General Assembly from 1981 to 1989 and in the State Senate from 1989 to 2008, representing the 11th Legislative District
- Taqwa Pinero (born 1983 as Taquan Dean), basketball player for Élan Béarnais Pau-Lacq-Orthez of the LNB Pro A
- Haydn Proctor (1903–1996), politician and judge who served as President of the New Jersey Senate and Associate Justice of the New Jersey Supreme Court
- Q Lazzarus (1960–2022), singer best known for her 1988 song "Goodbye Horses", which became a cult classic after being prominently featured in a scene from Jonathan Demme's 1991 film The Silence of the Lambs
- Ed Radwanski (born 1963, class of 1981), former professional soccer player who played for the 1985 US National team and was head coach of the UNC-G Women's soccer team
- Nate Ramsey (born 1941), football player, safety and cornerback who played for the Philadelphia Eagles for most of his 11-year NFL career (1963–1973)
- Len Renery (born 1948, class of 1966), retired English-American professional soccer defender and coach
- Karl Roberson (born 1990), professional mixed martial artist and former kickboxer currently competing in the middleweight division of the Ultimate Fighting Championship
- Isaac Schlossbach (1891–1984), polar explorer, submariner and aviation pioneer
- Southside Johnny (born 1948 as John Lyon), singer-songwriter and frontman of the Asbury Jukes
- Chester I. Steele (1913–1937), Rear Admiral who served in the United States Coast Guard
- Richard R. Stout (1912–1986), politician who served in the New Jersey Senate from 1952 to 1974
- Garry Tallent (born 1949, class of 1967), musician and record producer, best known for being bass player and founding member of the E Street Band
- Valerie Terrigno (born 1954), former mayor of West Hollywood, California
- Ronald R. Thomas (born 1949, class of 1967), writer, educator, and 13th president of the University of Puget Sound
- Ned Thomson (born 1953), politician who represented the 30th Legislative District in the New Jersey General Assembly from 2017 to 2024
- Joe Vetrano (1918–1995; class of 1936), football player who was a member of the inaugural team of the San Francisco 49ers
- Dennis Walters (born 1949), trick-shot golfer who won the Bob Jones Award in 2018 and was inducted into the World Golf Hall of Fame with the class of 2019
