= Shark River (New Jersey) =

Coordinates: 40.175266°N 74.031114°W

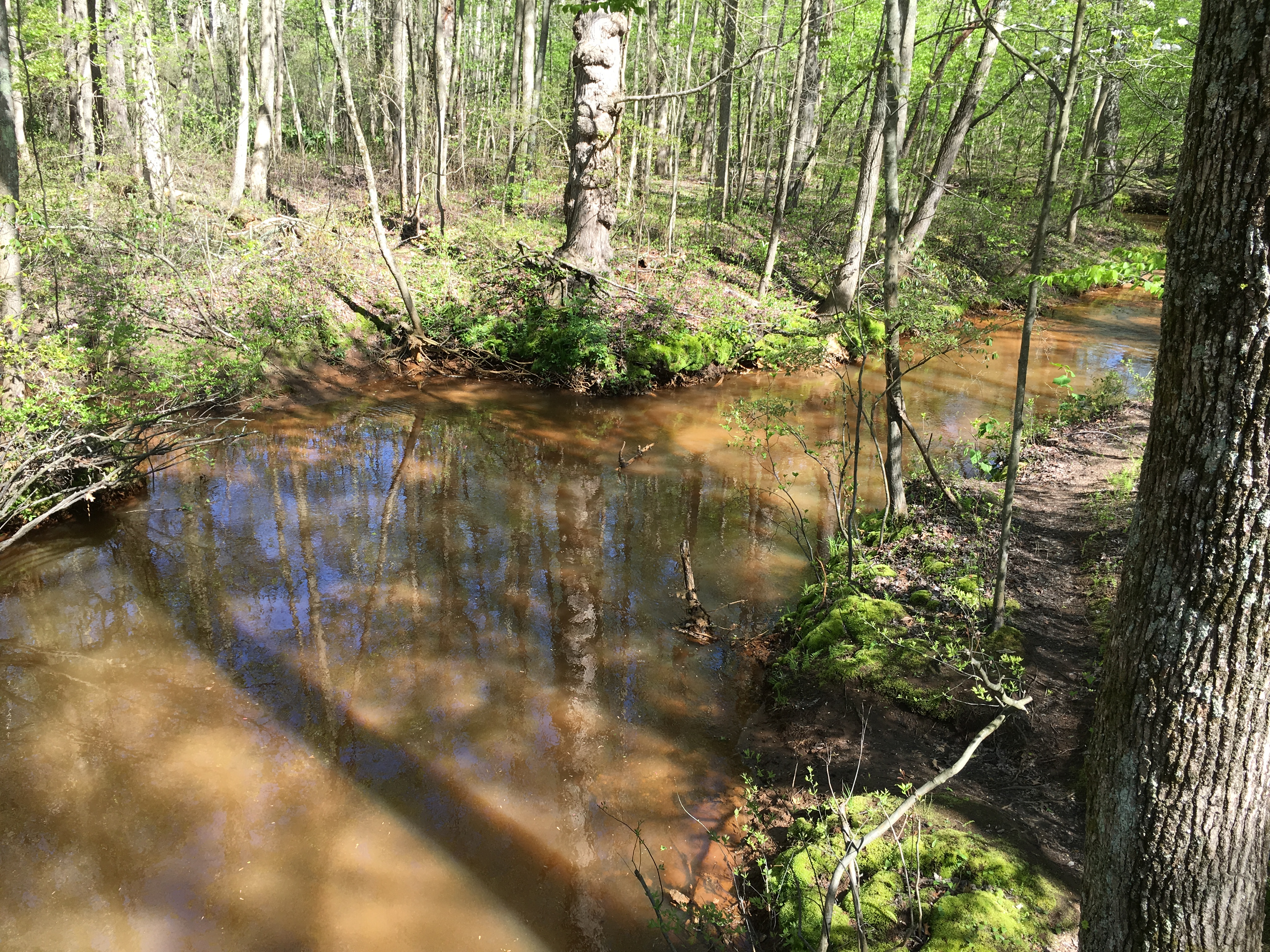
- As it appears within Shark River Park

Location
- Country: United States

Physical characteristics
- Source
  - location: Eastern Monmouth County
- Mouth
  - location: Atlantic Ocean
  - elevation: 0 m (0 ft)
- Length: 11.7 mi (18.8 km)

The Shark River is a river in eastern New Jersey that rises in eastern Monmouth County and flows southeast for 11.7 miles (18.8 km), continuing through Neptune Township and Wall Township. The river continues towards the Shark River Inlet, an estuary that feeds into the Atlantic Ocean between Belmar and Avon-by-the-Sea.

== History ==
Originally called Nolletquesset by the Lenni Lenape Indians, the name Shark River appears on the 1686 John Reid manuscript map of East Jersey which is the earliest existing detailed map of Monmouth County. Due to the location of the county poor farm in what is now Shark River Hills, the river and surrounding area was given the nickname of Shirk River due to the shiftless folks lazing about on the banks of the river near the poor farm. "Shack River" was also derogatorily used in describing the area in relation to the shacks and shanties in which the poor shirkers dwelled in. Revolutionary soldiers gave the nickname of Hogs Pond to the area as wild hogs roamed freely throughout the woods near the salt works there.

One 1812 map of New Jersey has Shark River titled as "White Creek" in reference to the White family who founded the Whitesville section of Neptune.

== River or bay ==
Shark River between Belmar and Avon-by-the-Sea

There is some disagreement about the Shark River actually being a river, as it closely resembles a tidal basin: a tidal, salt water region separated from the open sea by a land formation, or barrier, and primarily influenced by oceanic tidal fluctuations.

The area commonly referred to as the Shark River (not the inlet with its bulkhead) is actually a small bay of approximately eight hundred acres which includes the confluence of four fresh water streams, adjacent mud flats, salt marshes, the open water, and the inlet which connects the bay to the Atlantic Ocean.

The term "river" generally refers to an aquatic entity that sustains a substantial amount of moving fresh water. The primary tributaries supplying fresh water to the Shark River tidal basin are; Shark River Stream, Jumping Brook; Musquash Brook, and Laurel Brook. These four streams, while draining a sizable watershed, only provide a negligible amount of fresh water to the basin when compared to the large amounts of salt water entering via the normal tidal fluctuation. This small amount of fresh water entering the bay, the relatively small size of the bay itself, and the substantial amounts of salt water that enters the bay (via the inlet), better describes the Shark River as a "tidal basin" than a river.

The river (or stream) travels through sediments deposited during the Late Eocene and Middle Miocene periods. Fossils of reptiles, mammals and shark teeth and other fish remains can be found along its banks.

== Monmouth County Park – Shark River Park ==
Shark River Park, the Monmouth County Park System's first park, opened in 1961, covers 933 acres (3.8 km^{2}) on either side of the Shark River in Neptune and Wall townships.

== See also ==
- List of New Jersey rivers
- Shark River Hills
