= Neptune Township Schools =

School district in Monmouth County, New Jersey, US

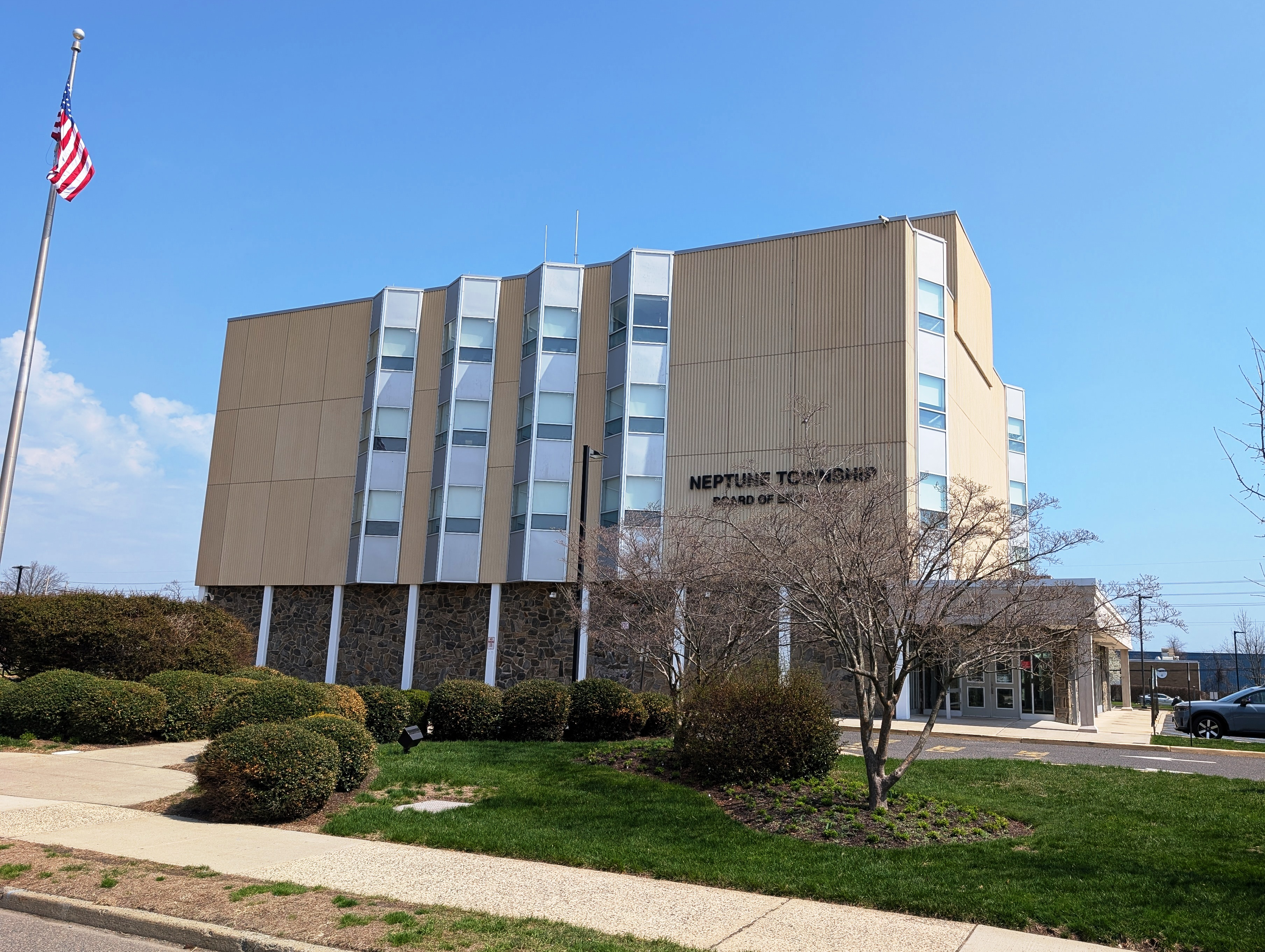
- District office building

Address
- 60 Neptune Boulevard Neptune Township, Monmouth County, New Jersey, 07753; United States
- Coordinates: 40.228164°N 74.06833°W

District information
- Grades: PreK to 12
- Superintendent: Tami Crader
- Business administrator: Peter Leonard
- Schools: 7
- Affiliation: Former Abbott district

Students and staff
- Enrollment: 3,411 (as of 2023–24)
- Faculty: 331.0 FTEs
- Student–teacher ratio: 10.3:1

Other information
- District Factor Group: CD
- Website: www.neptune.k12.nj.us
Ind.	Per pupil	District spending	Rank (*)	K-12 average	%± vs. average
1A	Total Spending	$22,381	90	$18,891	18.5%
1	Budgetary Cost	15,458	68	14,783	4.6%
2	Classroom Instruction	8,506	43	8,763	−2.9%
6	Support Services	2,125	43	2,392	−11.2%
8	Administrative Cost	1,637	81	1,485	10.2%
10	Operations & Maintenance	2,764	99	1,783	55.0%
13	Extracurricular Activities	414	101	268	54.5%
16	Median Teacher Salary	53,852	5	64,043
Data from NJDoE 2014 Taxpayers' Guide to Education Spending. *Of K-12 districts with more than 3,500 students. Lowest spending=1; Highest=103

The Neptune Township School District (NTSD) or Neptune Township Schools are a comprehensive community public school district that serves students in pre-kindergarten through twelfth grade from Neptune Township, in Monmouth County, in the U.S. state of New Jersey. The district is one of 31 former Abbott districts statewide that were established pursuant to the decision by the New Jersey Supreme Court in Abbott v. Burke which are now referred to as "SDA Districts" based on the requirement for the state to cover all costs for school building and renovation projects in these districts under the supervision of the New Jersey Schools Development Authority.

As of the 2022–23 school year, the district, comprised of seven schools, had an enrollment of 3,411 students and 331.0 classroom teachers (on an FTE basis), for a student–teacher ratio of 10.3:1.

Public school students in ninth through twelfth grades from Neptune City attend Neptune High School as part of a sending/receiving relationship with the Neptune City School District; in a study published in May 2015, the district looked at modifying its relationship with the Neptune Township district, considering leaving the agreement unchanged, adding students in grades 6–8 to the sending arrangement or a regionalization of the two districts.

== History ==
Previously the school district had segregated of students by race. In 1948 however the elementary school and its teaching staff were racially integrated.

In the wake of cuts in state aid, the district closed the Early Childhood Center at the end of the 2020–21 school year, with preschool students allocated to attend elementary schools.

The district had been classified by the New Jersey Department of Education as being in District Factor Group "CD", the sixth-highest of eight groupings. District Factor Groups organize districts statewide to allow comparison by common socioeconomic characteristics of the local districts. From lowest socioeconomic status to highest, the categories are A, B, CD, DE, FG, GH, I and J.

== Schools ==
Schools in the district (with 2022–23 enrollment data from the National Center for Education Statistics) are:

Elementary schools

- Gables Elementary School with 288 students in grades PreK–5
  - Kathleen Thomsen, principal
- Green Grove Elementary School with 294 students in grades PreK–5
  - James Nulle, principal
- Midtown Community Elementary School with 430 students in grades PreK–5
  - Mark Alfone, principal
- Shark River Hills Elementary School with 235 students in grades PreK–5
  - Joshua Loveland, principal
- Summerfield Elementary School with 380 students in grades PreK–5
  - Jerard L. Terrell, principal

Middle school

- Neptune Middle School with 625 students in grades 6–8
  - Janelle D. Opoku, principal

High school

- Neptune High School with 1,102 students in grades 9–12
  - Tom Decker, principal

== Administration ==
Core members of the district's administration are:

- Tami Crader, superintendent of schools
- Peter J. Leonard, business administrator and board secretary

Former superintendent of schools David A. Mooij died in June 2015, just ten days prior to his announced retirement after more than 40 years in the district.

== Board of education ==
The district's board of education, comprised of nine members, sets policy and oversees the fiscal and educational operation of the district through its administration. As a Type II school district, the board's trustees are elected directly by voters to serve three-year terms of office on a staggered basis, with three seats up for election each year held as part of the April school election. The board appoints a superintendent to oversee the district's day-to-day operations and a business administrator to supervise the business functions of the district. As one of the 13 districts statewide with school elections in April, voters also decide on passage of the annual school budget.
