= Neptune Township, New Jersey =

Township in Monmouth County, New Jersey, US

- Township
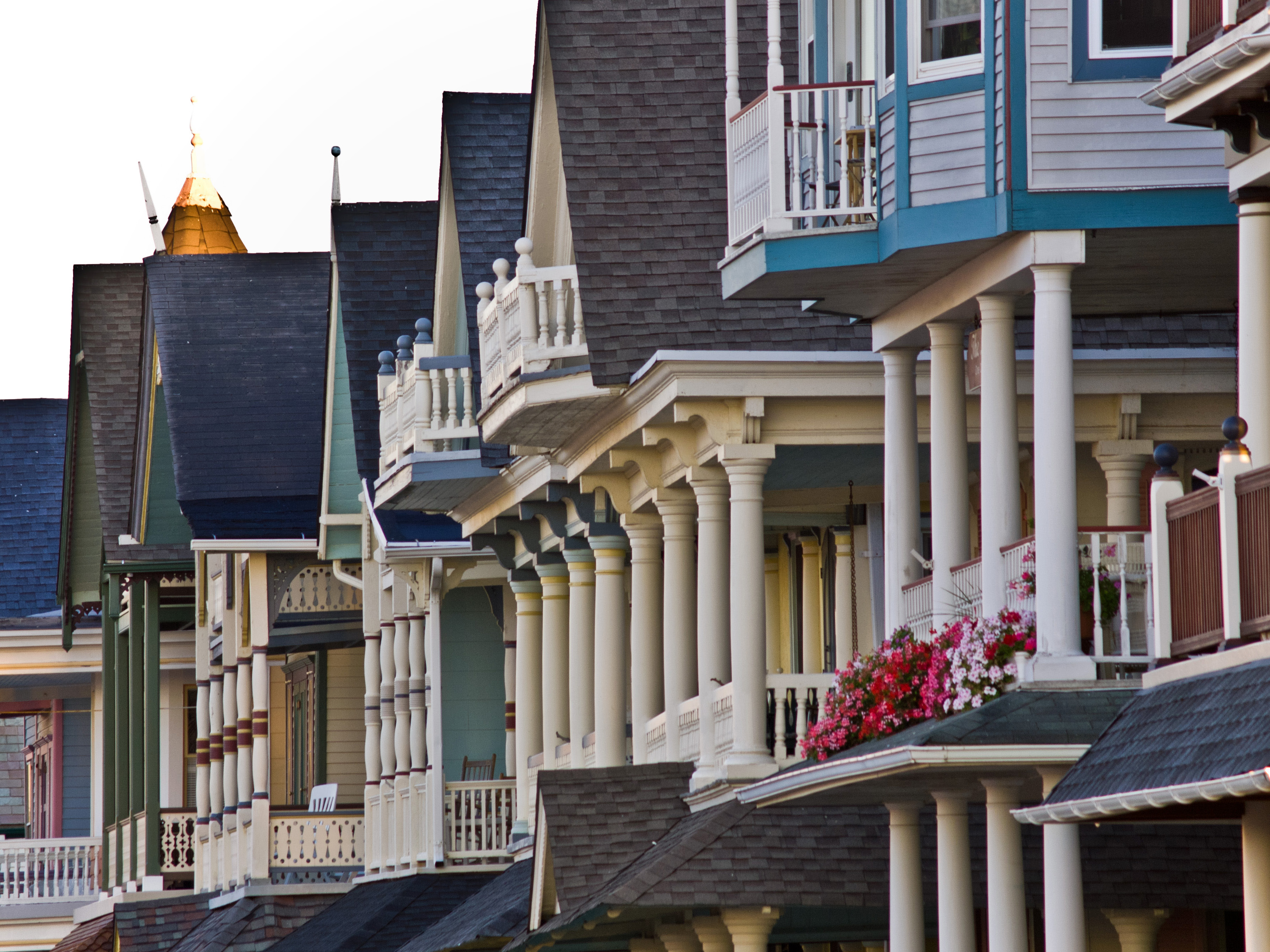
- Row of Victorian houses in the village of Ocean Grove

- Seal
- Nickname: The Crossroads of the Jersey Shore
- Motto: Where Community, Business & Tourism Prosper
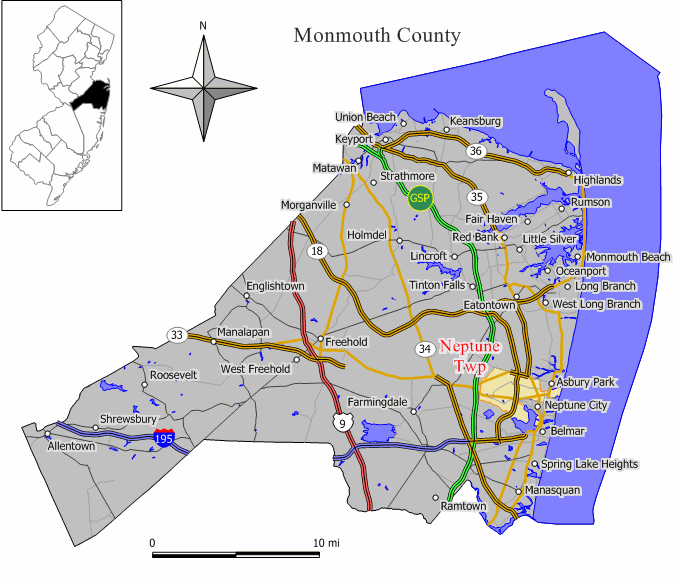
- Location of Neptune Township in Monmouth County highlighted in yellow (right). Inset map: Location of Monmouth County in New Jersey highlighted in black (left).

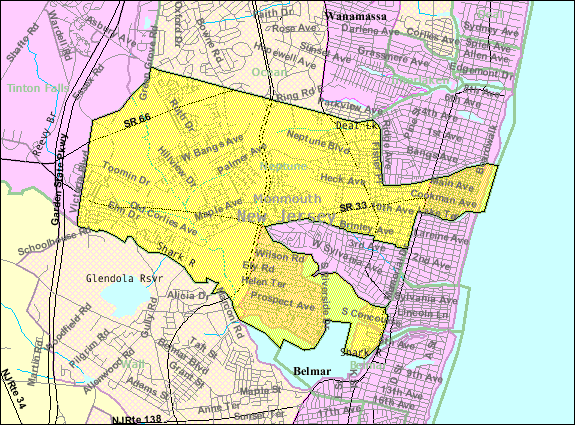
- Census Bureau map of Neptune Township, New Jersey
- Interactive map of Neptune Township, New Jersey
- Location in Monmouth County Location in New Jersey Location in the United States
- Coordinates: 40.213816°N 74.053712°W
- Country: United States
- State: New Jersey
- County: Monmouth
- Incorporated: February 26, 1879
- Named for: Neptune, Roman water deity

Government
  - Type: Township
  - Body: Township Committee
  - Mayor: Robert Lane Jr. (D, term ends December 31, 2025)
  - Administrator: Gina LaPlaca
  - Municipal clerk: Gabriella Siboni

Area
  - Total: 8.84 sq mi (22.90 km^{2})
  - Land: 8.13 sq mi (21.05 km^{2})
  - Water: 0.72 sq mi (1.86 km^{2}) 8.11%
  - Rank: 222nd of 565 in state 14th of 53 in county
- Elevation: 52 ft (16 m)

Population (2020)
  - Total: 28,061
  - Estimate (2023): 27,986
  - Rank: 88th of 565 in state 7th of 53 in county
  - Density: 3,452.8/sq mi (1,333.1/km^{2})
  - Rank: 196th of 565 in state 22nd of 53 in county
- Time zone: UTC−05:00 (Eastern (EST))
  - Summer (DST): UTC−04:00 (Eastern (EDT))
- ZIP Codes: 07753–07754
- Area code: 732
- FIPS code: 3402549890
- GNIS feature ID: 0882111
- Website: www.neptunetownship.org

Neptune Township is a township in Monmouth County, in the U.S. state of New Jersey. As of the 2020 United States census, the township's population was 28,061, an increase of 126 (+0.5%) from the 2010 census count of 27,935, which in turn reflected an increase of 245 (+0.9%) from the 27,690 counted in the 2000 census.

Featuring Jersey Shore Medical Center, the historic community of Ocean Grove, along with office parks and cultural amenities, Neptune Township has been a longtime regional commercial and cultural hub of the Jersey Shore. The township was named for Neptune, the Roman water deity; referring to its location on the Atlantic Ocean.

== History ==
Neptune was incorporated as a township by an act of the New Jersey Legislature on February 26, 1879, from portions of Ocean Township. Portions of the township were taken to form Neptune City (October 4, 1881), Bradley Beach (March 13, 1893) and Ocean Grove (April 5, 1920, until the action was found unconstitutional and restored to Neptune Township as of June 16, 1921).

== Geography ==
According to the U.S. Census Bureau, the township had a total area of 8.84 square miles (22.90 km^{2}), including 8.13 square miles (21.05 km^{2}) of land and 0.72 square miles (1.86 km^{2}) of water (8.11%).

Ocean Grove (2020 Census population of 2,549) and Shark River Hills (3,583) are census-designated places and unincorporated communities located within Neptune Township. Other unincorporated communities, localities and place names located partially or completely within the township include Bradley Park, the Gables, Green Grove, Hamilton, Hamilton Mills, Mid-Town, Summerfield, Seaview Island, The Observatory, West Grove, West Neptune and Whitesville.

Neptune stretches from the Atlantic Ocean west to the Garden State Parkway (Exit 100). The southern border is the Shark River estuary and the northern border is with Asbury Park and Ocean Township. Neptune Township is a diverse community, both in terms of population and landscape, extending from the seaside community of Ocean Grove, a national historic site, to Mid-town which is undergoing a municipal-led revitalization, to the riverside residential community of Shark River Hills, to the open spaces of Shark River Park and the commercial corridor on Route 66 in the west.

The township borders the Monmouth County communities of Asbury Park, Avon-by-the-Sea, Belmar, Bradley Beach, Neptune City, Ocean Township, Tinton Falls and Wall Township.

Deal Lake covers 158 acres (64 ha) and is overseen by the Deal Lake Commission, which was established in 1974. Seven municipalities border the lake, accounting for 27 miles (43 km) of shoreline, also including Allenhurst, Asbury Park, Deal, Interlaken, Loch Arbour and Ocean Township.

== Demographics ==
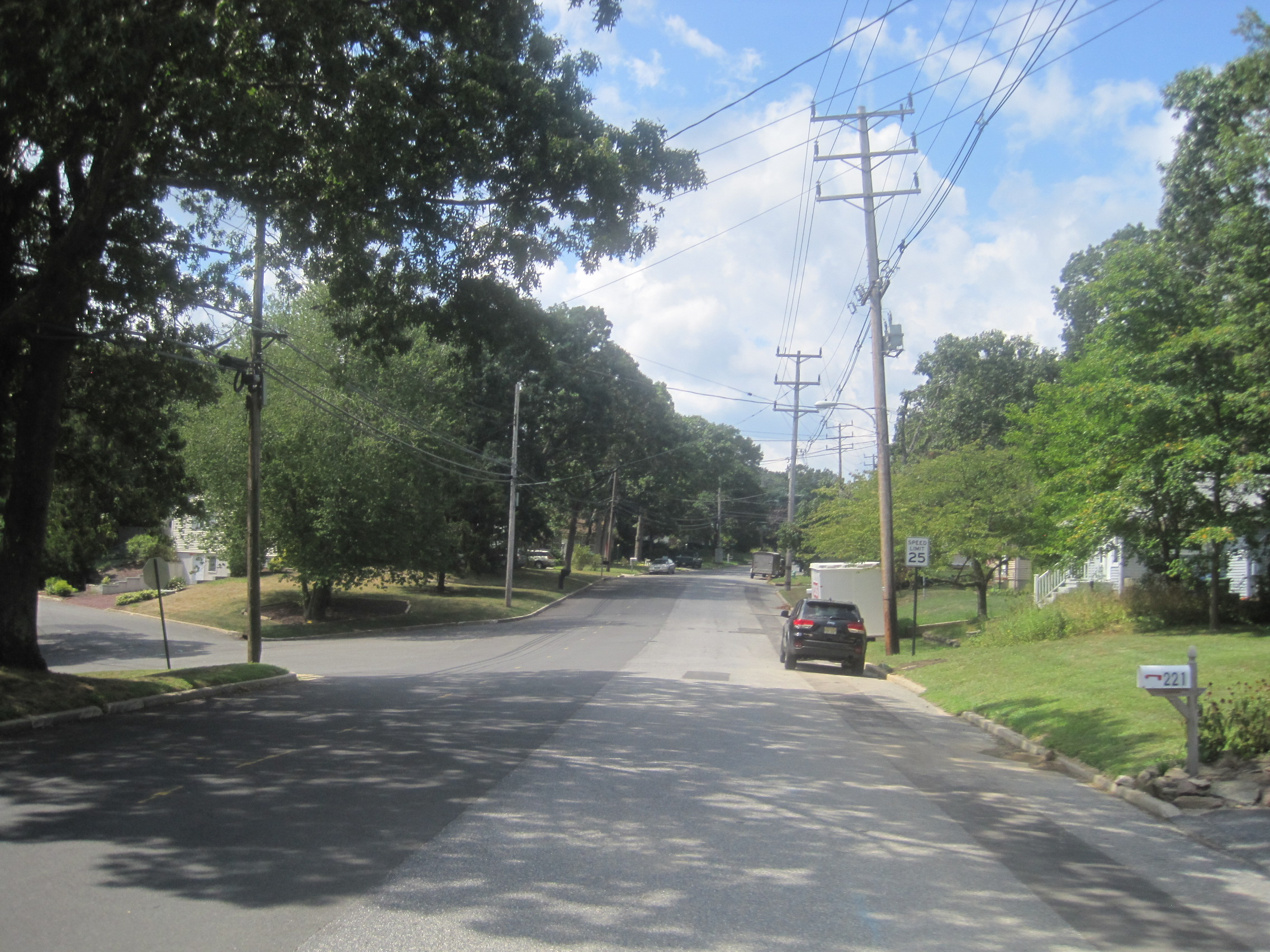
The Shark River Hills neighborhood

Historical population
Census	Pop.	Note	%±
1880	4,187		—
1890	8,333	*	99.0%
1900	7,943	*	−4.7%
1910	5,551		−30.1%
1920	6,470		16.6%
1930	10,625		64.2%
1940	10,207		−3.9%
1950	13,613		33.4%
1960	21,487		57.8%
1970	27,863		29.7%
1980	28,366		1.8%
1990	28,148		−0.8%
2000	27,690		−1.6%
2010	27,935		0.9%
2020	28,061		0.5%
2023 (est.)	27,986		−0.3%
Population sources: 1880–1920 1880–1890; 1890–1910 1910–1930; 1940–2000 2000; 2010 2020 * = Lost territory in previous decade.

=== 2010 census ===
The 2010 United States census counted 27,935 people, 11,201 households, and 6,844 families in the township. The population density was 3,414.3 per square mile (1,318.3/km^{2}). There were 12,991 housing units at an average density of 1,587.8 per square mile (613.1/km^{2}). The racial makeup was 53.18% (14,855) White, 38.56% (10,772) Black or African American, 0.34% (94) Native American, 2.26% (632) Asian, 0.03% (9) Pacific Islander, 2.51% (701) from other races, and 3.12% (872) from two or more races. Hispanic or Latino of any race were 9.33% (2,607) of the population.

Of the 11,201 households, 23.6% had children under the age of 18; 39.6% were married couples living together; 16.6% had a female householder with no husband present and 38.9% were non-families. Of all households, 31.8% were made up of individuals and 11.7% had someone living alone who was 65 years of age or older. The average household size was 2.45 and the average family size was 3.13.

20.6% of the population were under the age of 18, 7.7% from 18 to 24, 24.8% from 25 to 44, 30.4% from 45 to 64, and 16.5% who were 65 years of age or older. The median age was 42.7 years. For every 100 females, the population had 87.2 males. For every 100 females ages 18 and older there were 83.5 males. The Census Bureau's 2006–2010 American Community Survey showed that (in 2010 inflation-adjusted dollars) median household income was $58,630 (with a margin of error of +/− $3,034) and the median family income was $74,422 (+/− $5,369). Males had a median income of $56,743 (+/− $4,233) versus $43,853 (+/− $3,118) for females. The per capita income for the borough was $30,656 (+/− $1,559). About 8.1% of families and 10.0% of the population were below the poverty line, including 13.7% of those under age 18 and 6.7% of those age 65 or over.

=== 2000 census ===
As of the 2000 United States census there were 27,690 people, 10,907 households, and 6,805 families residing in the township. The population density was 3,366.8 inhabitants per square mile (1,299.9/km^{2}). There were 12,217 housing units at an average density of 1,485.4 per square mile (573.5/km^{2}). The racial makeup of the township was 55.92% White, 38.16% African American, 0.17% Native American, 1.17% Asian, 0.04% Pacific Islander, 1.98% from other races, and 2.56% from two or more races. Hispanic or Latino of any race were 5.55% of the population.

There were 10,907 households, out of which 26.3% had children under the age of 18 living with them, 42.6% were married couples living together, 15.8% had a female householder with no husband present, and 37.6% were non-families. 31.5% of all households were made up of individuals, and 11.8% had someone living alone who was 65 years of age or older. The average household size was 2.46 and the average family size was 3.14.

In the township the population was spread out, with 23.1% under the age of 18, 6.7% from 18 to 24, 29.7% from 25 to 44, 23.8% from 45 to 64, and 16.8% who were 65 years of age or older. The median age was 39 years. For every 100 females, there were 87.1 males. For every 100 females age 18 and over, there were 82.0 males.

The median income for a household in the township was $46,250, and the median income for a family was $57,735. Males had a median income of $42,920 versus $31,057 for females. The per capita income for the township was $22,569. About 7.6% of families and 11.7% of the population were below the poverty line, including 17.2% of those under age 18 and 9.7% of those age 65 or over.

== Government ==
=== Local government ===
Neptune Township is governed under the Township form of New Jersey municipal government, one of 141 municipalities (of the 564) statewide that use this form, the second-most commonly used form of government in the state. The Township Committee is comprised of five members, who are elected directly by the voters at-large in partisan elections to serve three-year terms of office on a staggered basis, with either one or two seats coming up for election each year as part of the November general election in a three-year cycle. At an annual reorganization meeting the Township Committee selects one of its members to serve as Mayor and another as Deputy Mayor.

As of 2025, Members of the Neptune Township committee are Mayor Robert Lane Jr. (D, term on committee and as mayor ends December 31, 2025), Deputy Mayor Kevin McMillan (term on committee ends 2027; term as deputy mayor ends 2025), Jason A. Jones (D, 2025; appointed to serve an unexpired term), Derel M. Stroud (D, 2027) and Tassie D. York (D, 2025).

In October 2024, after the township committee didn't make a choice from the three candidates nominated, the township's Democratic Party committee chose past Neptune Board of Education President Jason A. Jones to fill the seat expiring in December 2025 that became vacant following the resignation of Keith Cafferty the previous month.

In April 2021, the Township Committee selected Tassie York to fill the seat expiring in December 2022 that had been held by Carol J. Rizzo until she resigned from office to move out of the county. York served on an interim basis until the November 2022 general election, when she was elected to serve the balance of the term of office.

In January 2016, the Township Council selected Carol J. Rizzo from three candidates nominated by the Democratic municipal committee to fill the seat expiring in December 2016 which was vacated by Eric Houghtaling when he took office in the New Jersey General Assembly earlier that month.

=== Federal, state and county representation ===
Neptune Township is located in the 6th Congressional District and is part of New Jersey's 11th state legislative district.

For the 119th United States Congress, New Jersey's 6th congressional district is represented by Frank Pallone (D, Long Branch). New Jersey is represented in the United States Senate by Democrats Cory Booker (Newark, term ends 2027) and Andy Kim (Moorestown, term ends 2031).

For the 2026–2027 session, the 11th legislative district of the New Jersey Legislature is represented in the New Jersey Senate by Vin Gopal (D, Long Branch) and in the General Assembly by Margie Donlon (D, Ocean Township) and Luanne Peterpaul (D, Long Branch).

Monmouth County is governed by a Board of County Commissioners composed of five members who are elected at-large to serve three-year terms of office on a staggered basis, with either one or two seats up for election each year as part of the November general election. At an annual reorganization meeting held in the beginning of January, the board selects one of its members to serve as director and another as deputy director.

As of 2026, Monmouth County's Commissioners are Director Thomas A. Arnone (R, Neptune City, 2028),Deputy Director Nick DiRocco (R, Wall Township, 2028), Susan M. Kiley (R, Hazlet Township, 2027), Erik Anderson (R, Shrewsbury, 2026), and Ross F. Licitra (R, Marlboro Township, 2026).

Constitutional officers elected on a countywide basis are Clerk Christine Giordano Hanlon (R, 2030; Ocean Township), Sheriff Shaun Golden (R, 2028; Howell Township) and Surrogate Maureen Raisch (R, 2026; Middletown Township).

=== Politics ===
United States presidential election results for Neptune Township
Year	Republican		Democratic		Third party(ies)	
Year	No.	%	No.	%	No.	%
2024	4,678	32.01%	9,774	66.88%	162	1.11%
2020	4,572	28.57%	11,218	70.10%	212	1.32%
2016	4,119	30.28%	9,092	66.83%	394	2.90%
2012	3,552	27.29%	9,350	71.85%	112	0.86%
2008	4,100	29.17%	9,900	70.43%	56	0.40%
2004	5,044	38.96%	7,803	60.27%	100	0.77%
2000	3,605	32.21%	7,132	63.72%	455	4.07%
1996	3,018	29.01%	6,544	62.89%	843	8.10%
1992	4,120	35.78%	5,804	50.40%	1,592	13.82%

As of March 2011, there were a total of 18,093 registered voters in Neptune Township, of which 6,481 (35.8%) were registered as Democrats, 2,780 (15.4%) were registered as Republicans and 8,825 (48.8%) were registered as Unaffiliated. There were seven voters registered as Libertarians or Greens.

Gubernatorial election results for Neptune Township
Year	Republican		Democratic		Third party(ies)	
Year	No.	%	No.	%	No.	%
2025	3,629	30.23%	8,287	69.04%	88	0.73%
2021	3,549	36.52%	6,051	62.26%	119	1.22%
2017	2,768	32.89%	5,438	64.62%	210	2.50%
2013	3,880	50.86%	3,637	47.67%	112	1.47%
2009	3,625	42.33%	4,425	51.68%	513	5.99%
2005	3,278	37.26%	5,148	58.51%	372	4.23%

In the 2012 presidential election, Democrat Barack Obama received 71.8% of the vote (9,350 cast), ahead of Republican Mitt Romney with 27.3% (3,552 votes) and other candidates with 0.9% (113 votes), among the 13,109 ballots cast by the township's 18,929 registered voters (94 ballots were spoiled), for a turnout of 69.3%. In the 2008 presidential election, Democrat Barack Obama received 69.4% of the vote (9,900 cast), ahead of Republican John McCain with 28.7% (4,100 votes) and other candidates with 0.4% (56 votes), among the 14,265 ballots cast by the township's 19,505 registered voters, for a turnout of 73.1%. In the 2004 presidential election, Democrat John Kerry received 60.0% of the vote (7,803 ballots cast), outpolling Republican George W. Bush with 38.8% (5,044 votes) and other candidates with 0.5% (100 votes), among the 13,004 ballots cast by the township's 18,444 registered voters, for a turnout percentage of 70.5.

In the 2013 gubernatorial election, Republican Chris Christie received 50.9% of the vote (3,880 cast), ahead of Democrat Barbara Buono with 47.7% (3,637 votes) and other candidates with 1.5% (112 votes), among the 7,811 ballots cast by the township's 18,939 registered voters (182 ballots were spoiled), for a turnout of 41.2%. In the 2009 gubernatorial election, Democrat Jon Corzine received 51.2% of the vote (4,425 ballots cast), ahead of Republican Chris Christie with 42.0% (3,625 votes), Independent Chris Daggett with 5.2% (447 votes) and other candidates with 0.8% (66 votes), among the 8,635 ballots cast by the township's 18,606 registered voters, yielding a 46.4% turnout.

United States Senate election results for Neptune Township1
Year	Republican		Democratic		Third party(ies)	
Year	No.	%	No.	%	No.	%
2024	4,387	31.28%	9,334	66.55%	304	2.17%
2018	3,444	30.71%	7,413	66.10%	358	3.19%
2012	3,556	29.03%	8,507	69.44%	187	1.53%
2006	2,966	37.26%	4,790	60.18%	204	2.56%

United States Senate election results for Neptune Township2
Year	Republican		Democratic		Third party(ies)	
Year	No.	%	No.	%	No.	%
2020	4,522	28.47%	11,054	69.58%	310	1.95%
2014	2,338	32.37%	4,785	66.25%	100	1.38%
2013	1,726	30.87%	3,832	68.53%	34	0.61%
2008	3,983	30.86%	8,619	66.77%	306	2.37%

== Education ==
The Neptune Township Schools serve students in pre-kindergarten through twelfth grade. The district is one of 31 former Abbott districts statewide that were established pursuant to the decision by the New Jersey Supreme Court in Abbott v. Burke which are now referred to as "SDA Districts" based on the requirement for the state to cover all costs for school building and renovation projects in these districts under the supervision of the New Jersey Schools Development Authority.

As of the 2022–23 school year, the district, comprised of seven schools, had an enrollment of 3,411 students and 331.0 classroom teachers (on an FTE basis), for a student–teacher ratio of 10.3:1. Schools in the district (with 2022–23 enrollment data from the National Center for Education Statistics) are Gables Elementary School with 288 students in grades PreK–5, Green Grove Elementary School with 294 students in grades PreK–5, Midtown Community Elementary School with 430 students in grades PreK–5, Shark River Hills Elementary School with 235 students in grades PreK–5, Summerfield Elementary School with 380 students in grades PreK–5, Neptune Middle School with 625 students in grades 6–8 and Neptune High School with 1,102 students in grades 9–12.

== Historic district ==
- Ocean Grove Camp Meeting Association District
- U.S. National Register of Historic Places
- U.S. Historic district
- New Jersey Register of Historic Places
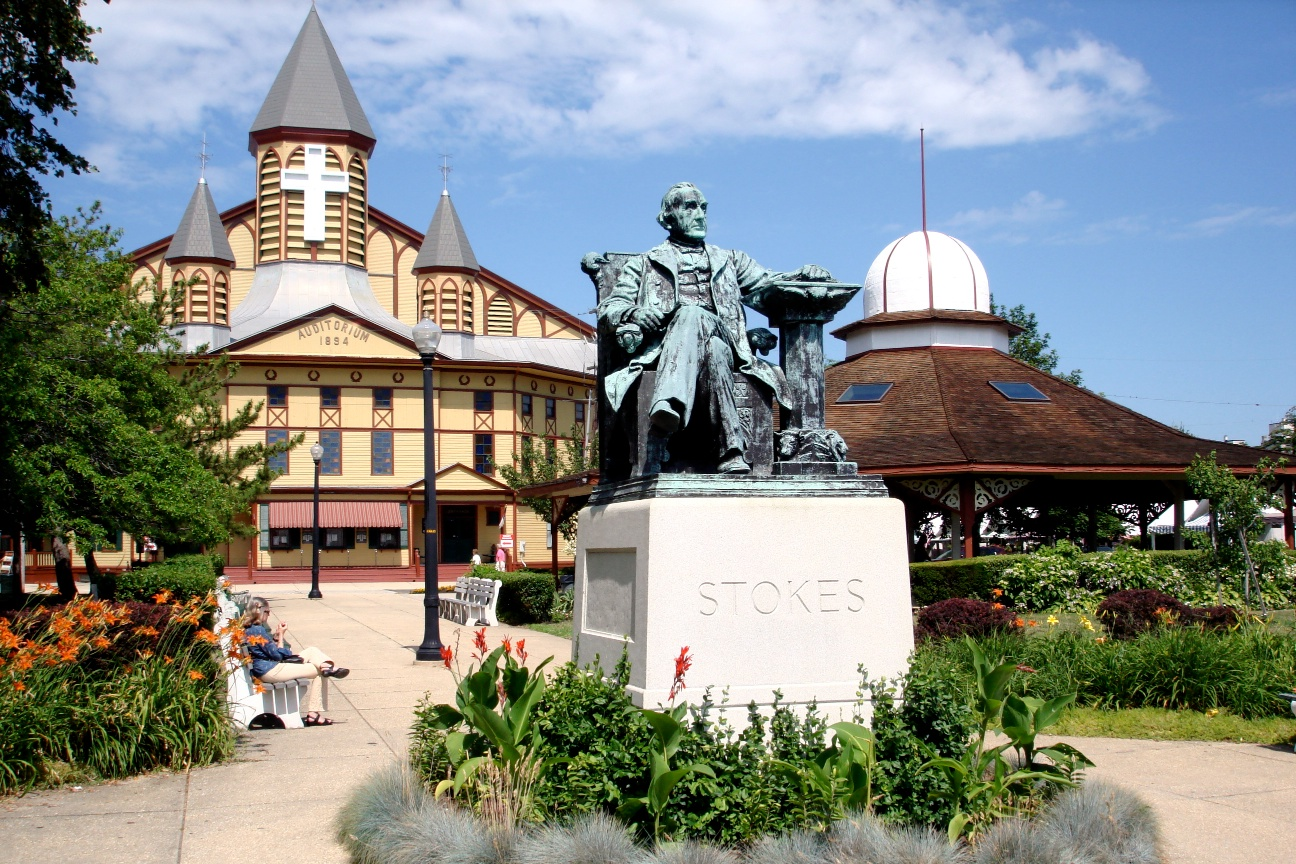
- A statue of Ellwood H. Stokes and the Great Auditorium facing Ocean Pathway – once named one of the ten most beautiful streets in America

- Location within Monmouth County, New Jersey Location within New Jersey Location within the United States
- Location: Bounded by Fletcher Lake, NJ Route 71, Lake Wesley and the Atlantic Ocean
- Area: 220 acres (89 ha)
- Architectural style: Bungalow/craftsman, Stick/eastlake, Queen Anne
- NRHP reference No.: 76001170
- NJRHP No.: 2036

Significant dates
- Added to NRHP: April 12, 1976
- Designated NJRHP: December 16, 1975

Ocean Grove is an unincorporated community and census-designated place that is part of Neptune Township. It had a population of 3,057 at the 2020 United States census. The Ocean Grove Camp Meeting Association was founded in 1869 as a summer camp meeting site by a group of Methodist clergymen, led by William B. Osborn and Ellwood H. Stokes, Ocean Grove is located on the Jersey Shore, between Asbury Park to the north and Bradley Beach to the south. Listed on the National Register of Historic Places, Ocean Grove is noted for its abundant examples of Victorian architecture and the Great Auditorium, acclaimed as "the state's most wondrous wooden structure, soaring and sweeping, alive with the sound of music". The Camp Meeting Association had kept its beach closed on Sunday mornings until the New Jersey Department of Environmental Protection ruled in 2025 that it must open the beach seven days a week, as beach replenishment projects and other enhancements have been made to the beach using state funds.

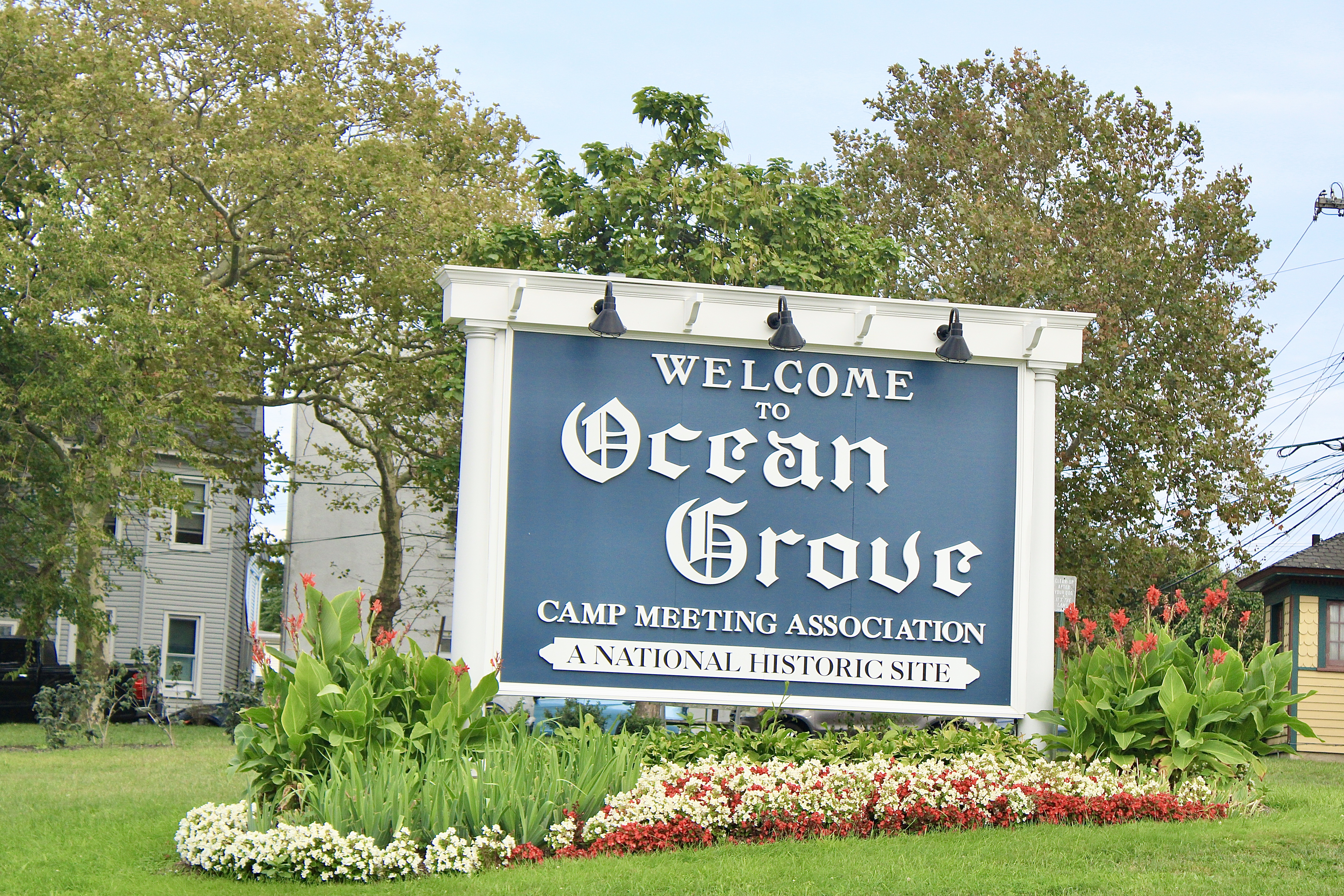
Ocean Grove Welcome Sign

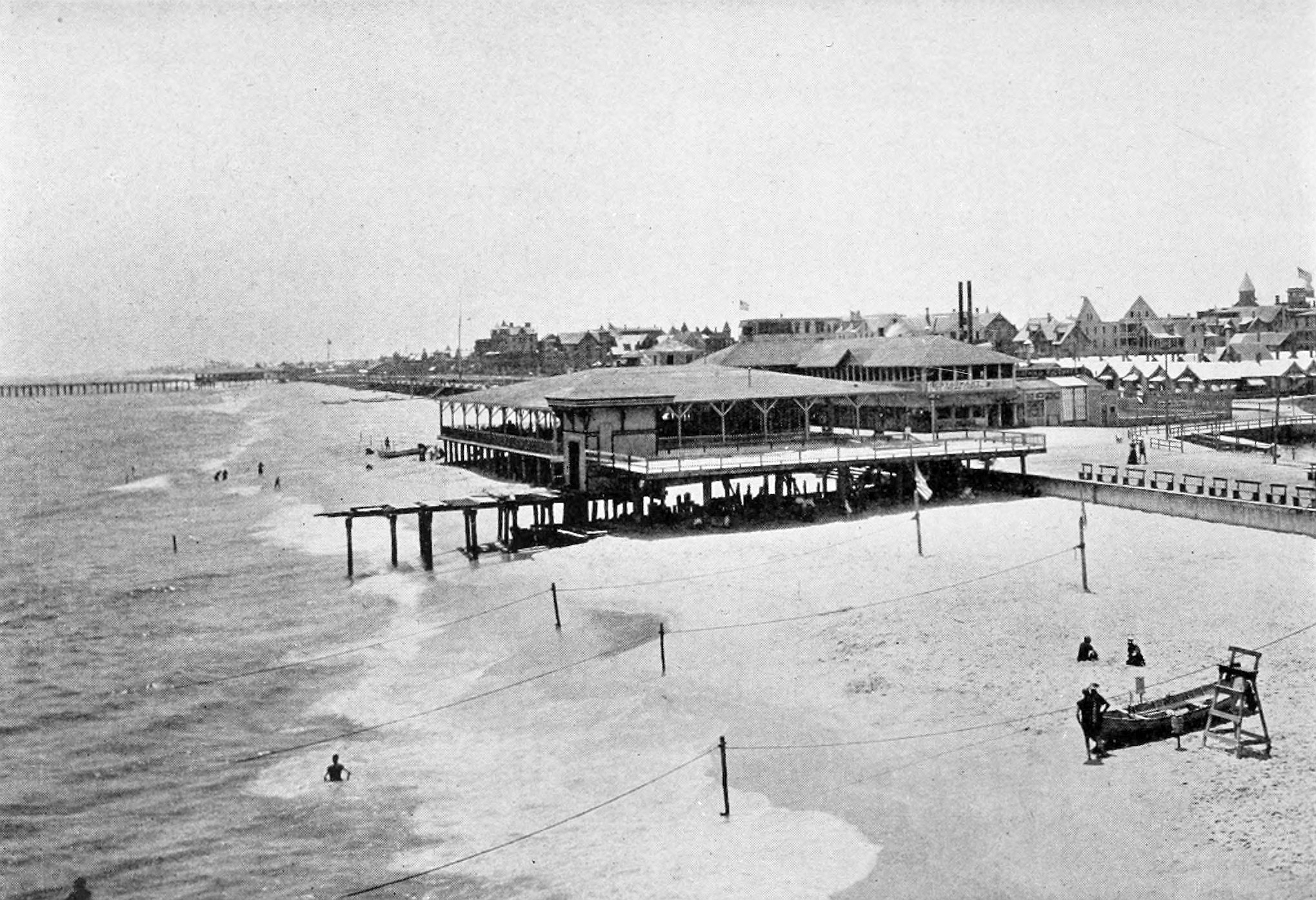
Photograph of Ocean Grove from the early 20th century

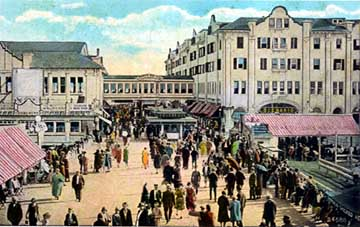
Street scene of Ocean Grove from atop the North End Hotel from the early 20th century

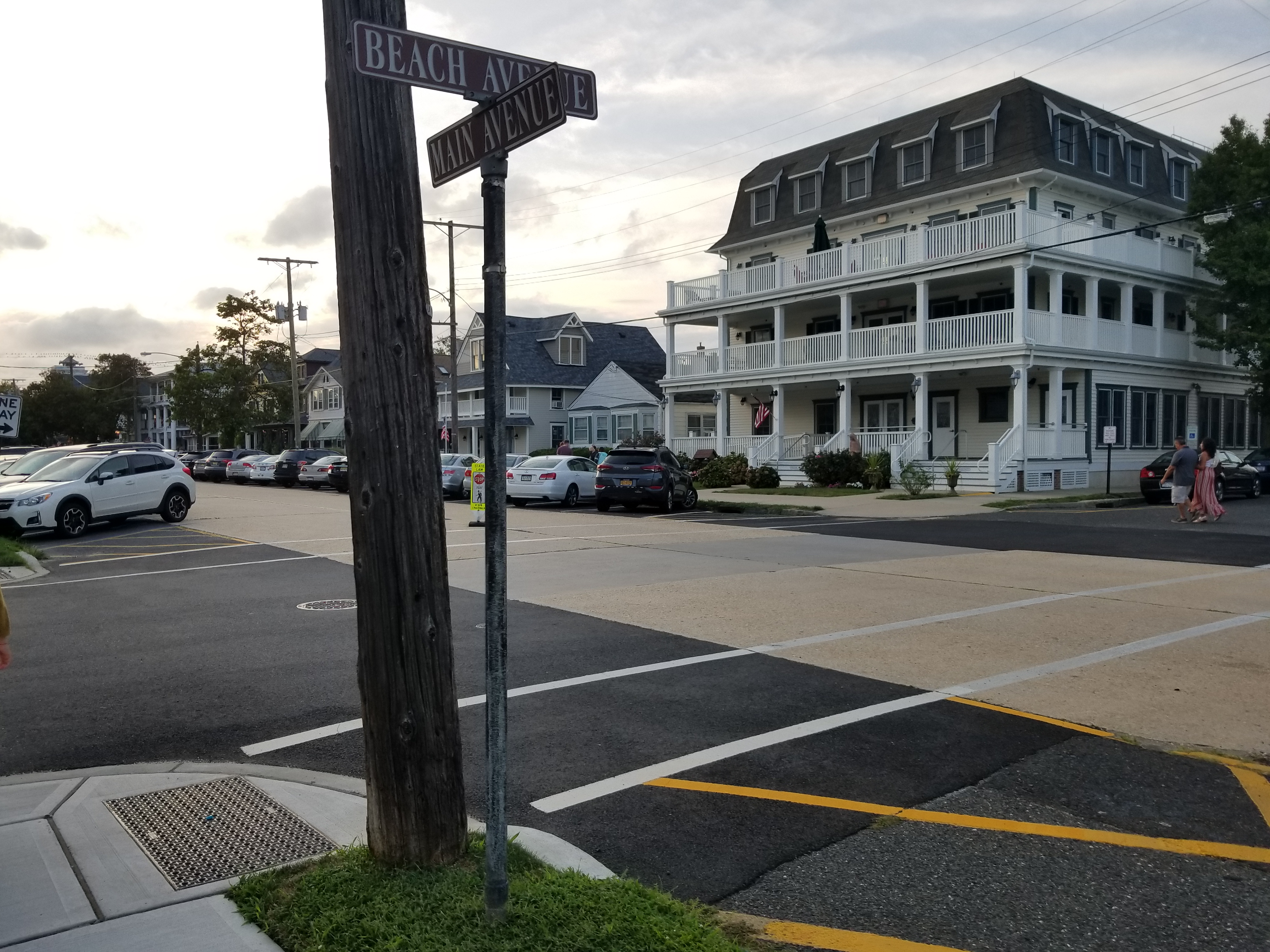
Modern Ocean Grove cityscape

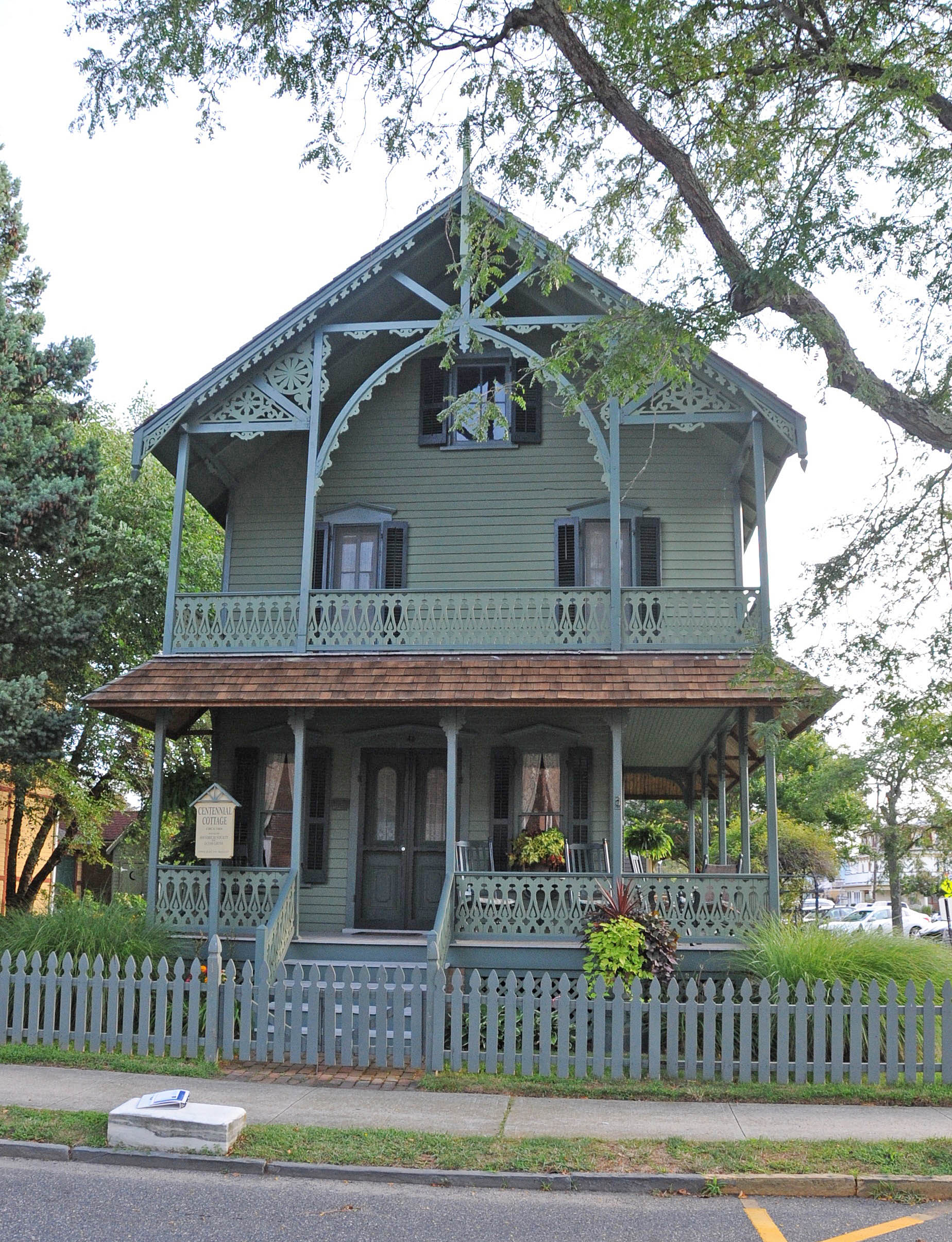
Centennial Cottage, an example of Victorian architecture in this village

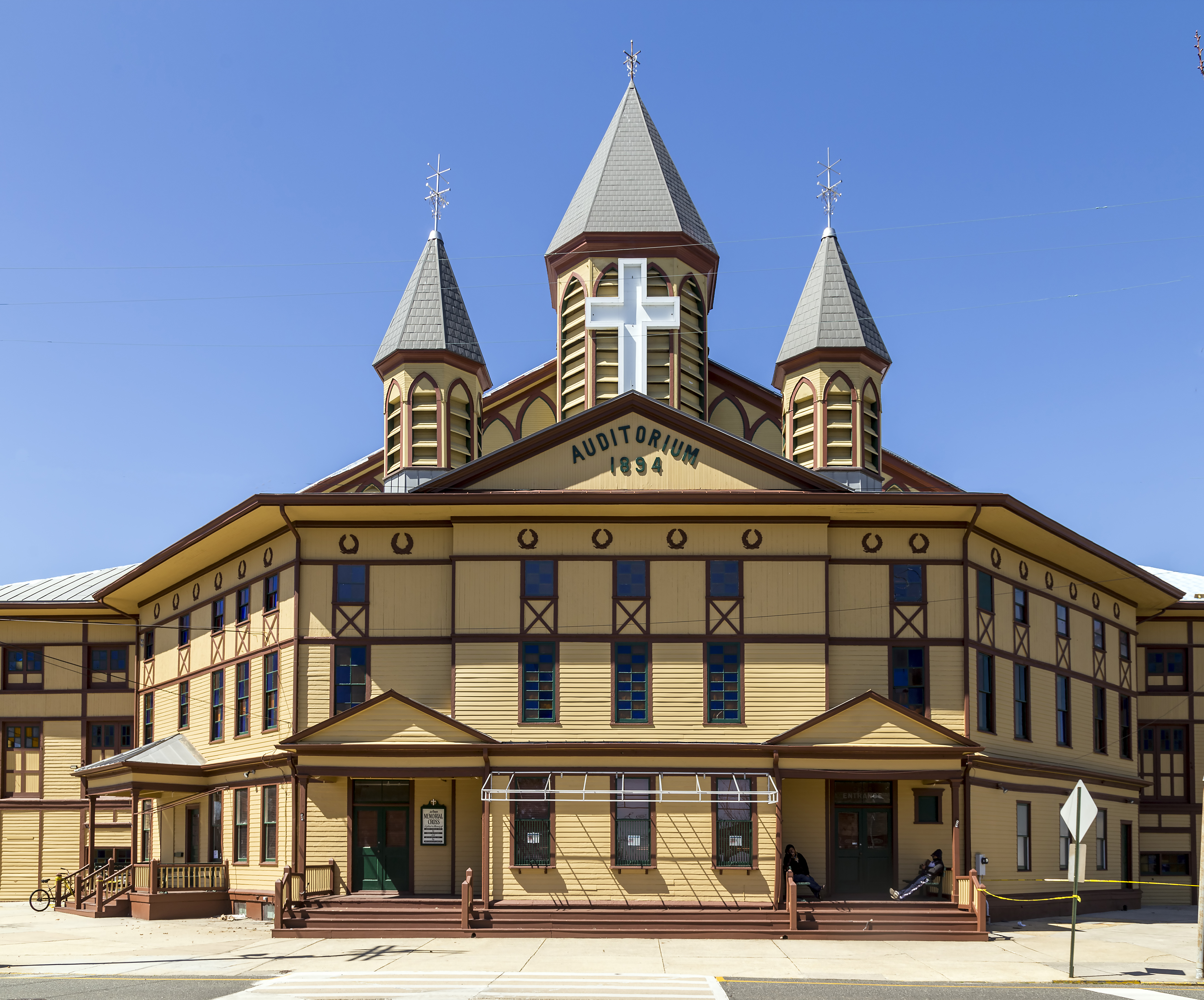
The Great Auditorium

== Infrastructure ==
=== Transportation ===
==== Roads and highways ====
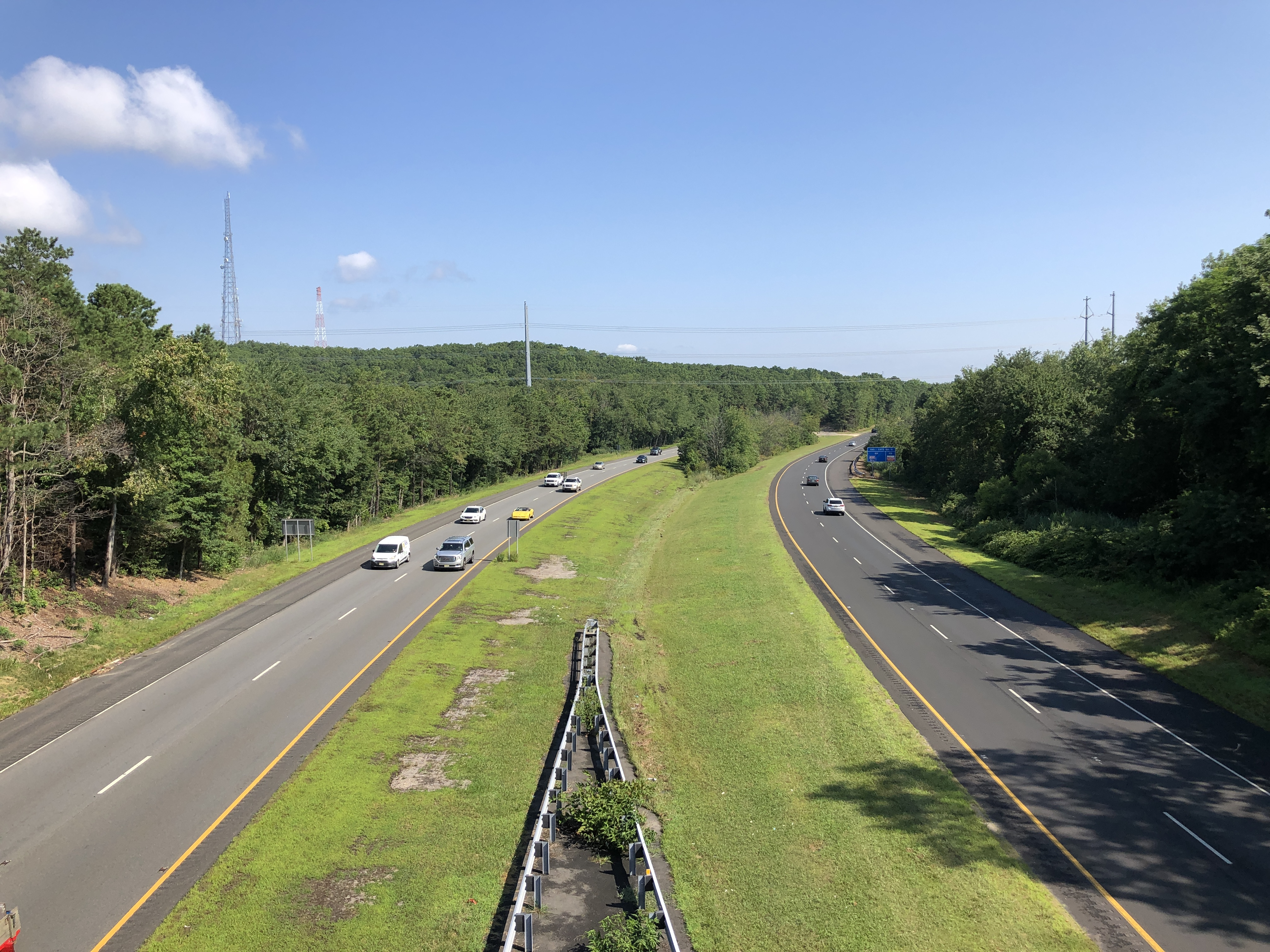
Route 18 northbound in Neptune Township

As of May 2010, the township had a total of 129.27 miles (208.04 km) of roadways, of which 108.92 miles (175.29 km) were maintained by the municipality, 8.73 miles (14.05 km) by Monmouth County and 11.62 miles (18.70 km) by the New Jersey Department of Transportation.

Route 18, Route 33, Route 35, Route 66 and Route 71 are the main highways passing through the township.

The Garden State Parkway is west of the township, with the best access provided via exits 100 and 102. Interstate 195 is southwest of the township in neighboring Wall Township. The New Jersey Turnpike (Interstate 95) entrance for Exit 8 is about 25 miles west on Route 33 in East Windsor, Mercer County.

==== Public transportation ====
The township is served by NJ Transit trains at the Bradley Beach station. Commuter service on the North Jersey Coast Line to Newark Penn Station, Secaucus Junction, New York Penn Station and Hoboken Terminal.

NJ Transit bus service between the township and Philadelphia is available on the 317 route and local service is provided by the 830, 832 and 836 routes.

=== Healthcare ===
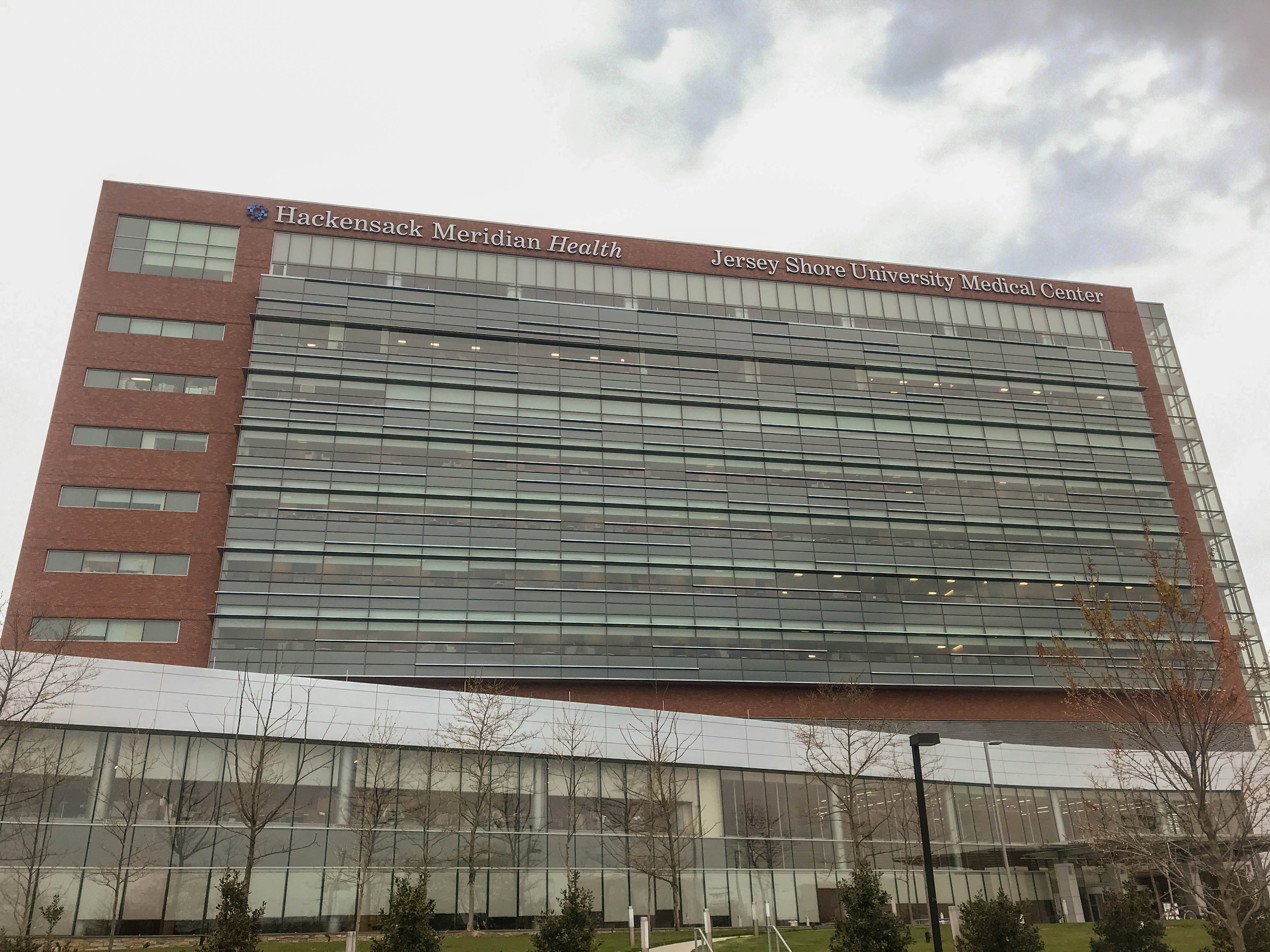
HOPE Tower at Jersey Shore University Medical Center

Jersey Shore University Medical Center (JSUMC) is a 691-bed non-profit, tertiary research and academic medical center located in Neptune Township. This major healthcare artery services the greater northern Jersey Shore region in Central Jersey. JSUMC is the shore region's only university-level academic medical center and is a major partner of the Hackensack Meridian Healthcare network (it is the system's second largest hospital). JSUMC is also affiliated with the Robert Wood Johnson Medical School of Rutgers University, and Hackensack Meridian School of Medicine. JSUMC is designated as a level II trauma center with a rooftop helipad handling medevac patients.

The medical complex also hosts the K. Hovnanian Children's Hospital, which treats infants, children, adolescents and young adults up to the age of 21. JSUMC is a major teaching and tertiary care hospital that has a staff of 127 interns and residents, as it's a member of the Council of Teaching Hospitals and Health Systems.

== Climate ==
Climate data for Neptune, NJ (1991–2020 normals)
Month	Jan	Feb	Mar	Apr	May	Jun	Jul	Aug	Sep	Oct	Nov	Dec	Year
Mean daily maximum °F (°C)	41.8 (5.4)	43.1 (6.2)	49.2 (9.6)	58.9 (14.9)	68.3 (20.2)	77.8 (25.4)	83.5 (28.6)	81.8 (27.7)	76.2 (24.6)	65.5 (18.6)	55.6 (13.1)	46.9 (8.3)	62.4 (16.9)
Daily mean °F (°C)	33.3 (0.7)	34.5 (1.4)	40.8 (4.9)	50.0 (10.0)	59.5 (15.3)	69.3 (20.7)	75.1 (23.9)	73.6 (23.1)	67.6 (19.8)	56.2 (13.4)	46.4 (8.0)	38.4 (3.6)	53.7 (12.1)
Mean daily minimum °F (°C)	24.8 (−4.0)	25.9 (−3.4)	32.3 (0.2)	41.0 (5.0)	50.8 (10.4)	60.9 (16.1)	66.8 (19.3)	65.4 (18.6)	58.9 (14.9)	46.9 (8.3)	37.3 (2.9)	30.0 (−1.1)	45.1 (7.3)
Average precipitation inches (mm)	4.20 (107)	3.31 (84)	4.33 (110)	3.91 (99)	4.13 (105)	4.34 (110)	4.40 (112)	6.27 (159)	4.33 (110)	4.71 (120)	3.82 (97)	4.78 (121)	52.53 (1,334)
Average precipitation days (≥ 0.01 in)	11.0	8.8	9.8	11.2	11.7	10.4	9.3	9.0	8.8	9.9	9.2	10.4	119.5
Source: NOAA

== Ecology ==
According to the A. W. Kuchler U.S. potential natural vegetation types, Neptune Township would have a dominant vegetation type of Appalachian Oak (104) with a dominant vegetation form of Eastern Hardwood Forest (25). The plant hardiness zone is 7a with an average annual extreme minimum air temperature of 3.6 °F (−15.8 °C).

== Notable people ==
People who were born in, residents of, or otherwise closely associated with Neptune Township include:

- Lynn Ahrens (born 1948), writer and lyricist for the musical theatre, television and film
- Edward G. Amoroso, computer security professional, entrepreneur, author and educator
- Jack Armstrong (born 1965), Major League Baseball pitcher who played for the Cincinnati Reds, Cleveland Indians, Florida Marlins and Texas Rangers
- Nicole Atkins (born 1978), singer-songwriter on Columbia Records
- Pat Battle (born 1959), WNBC-TV's New Jersey Bureau Reporter, Saturday Today (NBC) in New York co-anchor, and occasional fill-in anchor
- Mary Porter Beegle (c. 1881–1966), dancer, theater professional and college administrator
- Fanny Crosby (1820–1915), composer of over 8,000 hymns and gospel songs
- Vinny Curry (born 1988), defensive end who played in the NFL for 11 seasons, won Super Bowl LII
- Michelle Davidson (born 1970), English Channel swimmer and U.S. Master Swimmer All-American
- Taquan Dean (born 1983), University of Louisville basketball player in 2006
- Danny DeVito (born 1944), actor
- Dedrick Dodge (born 1965), safety (American football position) for eight NFL seasons, from 1991 to 1998
- Darren Fenster (born 1978), manager in the Boston Red Sox minor league system
- Dan Gonzalez (born 1974), football quarterback who played two seasons with the Montreal Alouettes of the Canadian Football League
- Trent Hindman (born 1995), race car driver in the WeatherTech SportsCar Championship
- Eric Houghtaling (born 1954), politician representing the 11th Legislative District in the New Jersey General Assembly, who had served as mayor of Neptune Township in 2013
- Robert C. Holub (1949–2023), Germanist, university professor and administrator who served as chancellor of the University of Massachusetts Amherst
- Keith Kirkwood (born 1993), wide receiver for the Baltimore Ravens of the National Football League
- Harry Larrison Jr. (1926–2005), politician who served on the Monmouth County Board of Chosen Freeholders for nearly 39 years, marking the longest tenure of a Freeholder in New Jersey history
- Ronald Naldi (born 1941 or 1942), singer at the Metropolitan Opera
- Cory Nelms (born 1988), NFL player
- Jack Nicholson (born 1937), actor
- Joseph A. Palaia (1927–2016), politician who served in the New Jersey General Assembly from 1981 to 1989 and in the State Senate from 1989 to 2008, representing the 11th Legislative District
- Shep Pettibone (born 1959), record producer, remixer, songwriter and club DJ, who was most prolific in the 1980s
- Haydn Proctor (1903–1996), member of the New Jersey Senate
- Q Lazzarus (1960–2022), singer best known for her 1988 song "Goodbye Horses", which became a cult classic after being prominently featured in a scene from Jonathan Demme's 1991 film The Silence of the Lambs
- Ed Radwanski (born 1963), professional soccer player
- Nate Ramsey (1941–2019), safety and cornerback who played for the Philadelphia Eagles for most of his 11-year NFL career from 1963 through 1973
- Len Renery (born 1948), retired English-American professional soccer defender and coach
- Karl Roberson (born 1990), professional mixed martial artist, former kickboxer, and former Ultimate Fighting Championship middleweight
- Isaac Schlossbach (1891–1984), polar explorer, submariner and aviation pioneer
- Rusty Schweickart (born 1935), astronaut
- George A. Sheehan (1918–1993), cardiologist and running advocate
- Southside Johnny (born 1948), singer / songwriter
- Richard R. Stout (1912–1986), politician who served in the New Jersey Senate from 1952 to 1974
- Bob Sykes (born 1954), baseball pitcher who played in MLB for the Detroit Tigers and St. Louis Cardinals
- Valerie Terrigno (born 1954), former mayor of West Hollywood, California
- Ronald R. Thomas (1949–2023), writer and educator, who was the 13th president of the University of Puget Sound
- Greg Trooper (1956–2017), singer-songwriter
- Bob Verga (born 1945), basketball player who played for the Dallas Chaparrals, Denver Rockets, New York Nets, Pittsburgh Condors, Portland Trail Blazers and Carolina Cougars
- Joe Vetrano (1918–1995), placekicker who played in the NFL for the San Francisco 49ers
- Dennis Walters (born 1949), trick-shot golfer who won the Bob Jones Award in 2018 and was inducted into the World Golf Hall of Fame with the class of 2019
- Robert Lee Watt (born 1948), French horn player
- Clinton Wheeler (born 1959), former professional basketball player
- Ajee' Wilson (born 1994), middle-distance runner
- Tim Wright (born 1990), tight end who has played in the NFL for the New England Patriots
