= Michael Halfacre =

American lawyer and politician (born 1966)

Michael I. Halfacre
- Born: July 13, 1966 (age 59); New Jersey
- Education: B.A. Florida State University (1988); J.D. University of Dayton School of Law (1991)
- Occupations: attorney, politician
- Spouse: Tricia Marshall

Michael I. Halfacre is an American lawyer and Republican Party politician from New Jersey. A former congressional candidate, mayor of the Borough of Fair Haven, New Jersey, and Director of the Division of Alcoholic Beverage Control within the Office of the Attorney General in the state's Department of Law and Public Safety.

== Biography ==
=== Early life and personal information ===
Halfacre is a lifelong resident of Fair Haven, New Jersey. He graduated Florida State University in 1988 with a Bachelor of Arts (B.A.) degree in political science. Three years later, he received J.D. degree from the University of Dayton School of Law. Halfacre is married with three children.

=== Political career ===
Halfacre was a member of the board of education of the Fair Haven Public Schools, and a member of the borough council from 1995 to 1997. He served as the town's mayor from 2007-2011. In 2009, Halfacre announced his candidacy for the House of Representatives in the 12th congressional district of New Jersey against six-term incumbent Democrat Rush Holt.
