= Rumson School District =

School district in Monmouth County, New Jersey, US

Address
- 60 Forrest Avenue Rumson, Monmouth County, New Jersey, 07760; United States
- Coordinates: 40.375728°N 74.004835°W

District information
- Grades: PreK-8
- Superintendent: John E. Bormann
- Business administrator: Denise McCarthy
- Schools: 2

Students and staff
- Enrollment: 911 (as of 2022–23)
- Faculty: 96.6 FTEs
- Student–teacher ratio: 9.4:1

Other information
- District Factor Group: J
- Website: www.rumsonschool.org
Ind.	Per pupil	District spending	Rank (*)	K-8 average	%± vs. average
1A	Total Spending	$17,288	42	$18,891	−8.5%
1	Budgetary Cost	12,965	25	14,159	−8.4%
2	Classroom Instruction	7,829	24	8,659	−9.6%
6	Support Services	2,037	42	2,167	−6.0%
8	Administrative Cost	1,691	57	1,547	9.3%
10	Operations & Maintenance	1,320	21	1,612	−18.1%
13	Extracurricular Activities	87	38	104	−16.3%
16	Median Teacher Salary	62,710	53	61,136
Data from NJDoE 2014 Taxpayers' Guide to Education Spending. *Of K-8 districts with more than 750 students. Lowest spending=1; Highest=84

The Rumson School District is a community public school district that serves students in pre-kindergarten through eighth grade from the Borough of Rumson, in Monmouth County, in the U.S. state of New Jersey.

As of the 2022–23 school year, the district, comprised of two schools, had an enrollment of 911 students and 96.6 classroom teachers (on an FTE basis), for a student–teacher ratio of 9.4:1.

The district is classified by the New Jersey Department of Education as being in District Factor Group "J", the highest of eight groupings. District Factor Groups organize districts statewide to allow comparison by common socioeconomic characteristics of the local districts. From lowest socioeconomic status to highest, the categories are A, B, CD, DE, FG, GH, I and J.

Public school students in ninth through twelfth grades attend Rumson-Fair Haven Regional High School, a regional, four-year comprehensive public high school serving students from both Fair Haven and Rumson, where the school is located. As of the 2022–23 school year, the high school had an enrollment of 876 students and 83.8 classroom teachers (on an FTE basis), for a student–teacher ratio of 10.5:1.

== Awards and recognition ==
For the 2001-02 school year, Forrestdale School was recognized with the Blue Ribbon Award from the United States Department of Education, the highest honor that an American school can achieve. In 2024, Forrestdale School was one of 11 statewide that was recognized as a Blue Ribbon School of Excellence.

== Schools ==
Schools in the district (with 2022–23 enrollment data from the National Center for Education Statistics) are:

- Deane-Porter Elementary School with 384 students in grades PreK-3
  - Erin O'Connell, principal
- Forrestdale School with 525 students in grade 4-8
  - Jennifer Gibbons, principal

== Administrators ==
Core members of the district's administration are:

- John E. Bormann, superintendent
- Denise McCarthy, business administrator and board secretary

== Board of education ==
The district's board of education, comprised of nine members, sets policy and oversees the fiscal and educational operation of the district through its administration. As a Type II school district, the board's trustees are elected directly by voters to serve three-year terms of office on a staggered basis, with three seats up for election each year held (since 2012) as part of the November general election. The board appoints a superintendent to oversee the district's day-to-day operations and a business administrator to supervise the business functions of the district.
