= Rumson-Fair Haven Regional High School =

High school in Monmouth County, New Jersey, US

Address
- 74 Ridge Road Rumson, Monmouth County, New Jersey, 07760; United States
- Coordinates: 40.369°N 74.002°W

District information
- Grades: 9–12
- Superintendent: Lee McDonald
- Business administrator: Sean Cranston
- Schools: 1

Students and staff
- Enrollment: 849 (as of 2023–24)
- Faculty: 81.6 FTEs
- Student–teacher ratio: 10.4:1

Other information
- District Factor Group: J
- Website: Official website
| Ind. | Per pupil | District spending | Rank (*) | 9–12 average | %± vs. average |
|---|---|---|---|---|---|
| 1A | Total Spending | $20,521 | 25 | $18,891 | 8.6% |
| 1 | Budgetary Cost | 16,562 | 28 | 15,592 | 6.2% |
| 2 | Classroom Instruction | 8,915 | 23 | 8,807 | 1.2% |
| 6 | Support Services | 3,054 | 41 | 2,294 | 33.1% |
| 8 | Administrative Cost | 1,743 | 31 | 1,592 | 9.5% |
| 10 | Operations & Maintenance | 1,761 | 14 | 1,954 | −9.9% |
| 13 | Extracurricular Activities | 1,085 | 36 | 873 | 24.3% |
| 16 | Median Teacher Salary | 60,719 | 8 | 71,726 |
Data from NJDoE 2014 Taxpayers' Guide to Education Spending. *Of 9–12 districts with any number of students. Lowest spending=1; Highest=47

Rumson-Fair Haven Regional High School

Information
- Type: Public high school
- Established: 1933; 93 years ago
- School district: Rumson-Fair Haven Regional School District
- NCES School ID: 341440004094
- Principal: Stephen Sarles
- Faculty: 81.6 FTEs
- Grades: 9–12
- Enrollment: 849 (as of 2023–24)
- Student to teacher ratio: 10.4:1
- Colors: Purple and white
- Athletics conference: Shore Conference
- Team name: Bulldogs
- Accreditation: Middle States Association of Colleges and Schools

The Rumson-Fair Haven Regional High School (often abbreviated RFH) is a regional, four-year comprehensive public high school and school district, serving students in ninth through twelfth grades from the suburban communities of Fair Haven and Rumson, which are situated on a peninsula bounded by the Navesink and Shrewsbury Rivers and the Atlantic Ocean, in northern Monmouth County, in the U.S. state of New Jersey. The school has been accredited by the Middle States Association of Colleges and Schools Commission on Elementary and Secondary Schools since 1940. The high school is the lone facility of the Rumson-Fair Haven High School District.

Rumson-Fair Haven High School receives students from two middle schools, Forrestdale Middle School of the Rumson School District and Knollwood School of the Fair Haven Public Schools, as well as from private schools, including Rumson Country Day School and Holy Cross School.

As of the 2023–24 school year, the school had an enrollment of 849 students and 81.6 classroom teachers (on an FTE basis), for a student–teacher ratio of 10.4:1. There were 2 students (0.2% of enrollment) eligible for free lunch and 1 (0.1% of students) eligible for reduced-cost lunch.

== History ==
A school building constructed in 1893 served students through tenth grade, after which they attended Red Bank High School. With a new high school on the way, the district received state permission to grant four-year diplomas starting in 1933. Students completing tenth grade advanced a grade each year, with the first graduates completing twelfth grade in 1935. A new high school facility was approved by voters in July 1934, ground was broken that November and students started attending school in the building in January 1936. The high school enrollment in the 1934–35 school year was 192, which included students from Fair Haven, which began sending students that year. Completed in Rumson with a mix of loans and grants from the Public Works Administration covering more than 80% of the cost, Rumson High School had a total price of $230,000 (equivalent to $5.4 million in 2025). Students from Fair Haven began attending as soon as the new school opened and the regional district was established in 1956. Since its original construction, the school facility has had three significant additions.

In fall 2004, information about Rumson-Fair Haven Regional High School and several other U.S. schools was recovered from a CD found on the body of a dead Iraqi insurgent killed in Baghdad. It was discovered from the body of an Iraqi physicist, the son of a member of the Iraqi Ba'ath Party. The man's father had a strong connection to the al-Qaeda terrorist network. The information pertaining to RFH did not include floor plans, but did contain information about the school's vandalism and bullying policies. The CD also contained information about radon and depleted uranium. The recent Beslan school hostage crisis in which 385 people were killed, half of them students, was compared to the school because RFH, like the Russian school, had construction underway. Police patrols around the school were increased in response to the potential threat.

The district had been classified by the New Jersey Department of Education as being in District Factor Group "J", the highest of eight groupings. District Factor Groups organize districts statewide to allow comparison by common socioeconomic characteristics of the local districts. From lowest socioeconomic status to highest, the categories are A, B, CD, DE, FG, GH, I and J.

== Awards, recognition and rankings ==
In 2011, Rumson-Fair Haven Regional High School was one of 14 schools in the state, and one of two public high schools, selected by the United States Department of Education with recognition with the National Blue Ribbon School Award of Excellence.

The school was the 10th-ranked public high school in New Jersey out of 339 schools statewide in New Jersey Monthly magazine's September 2014 cover story on the state's "Top Public High Schools", using a new ranking methodology. The school had also been ranked 10th in the state of 328 schools in 2012, after being ranked 31st in 2010 out of 322 schools listed. The magazine ranked the school 30th in 2008 out of 316 schools. The school was ranked 33rd in the magazine's September 2006 issue, which included 316 schools across the state. Schooldigger.com ranked the school tied for 49th out of 381 public high schools statewide in its 2011 rankings (a decrease of 19 positions from the 2010 ranking) which were based on the combined percentage of students classified as proficient or above proficient on the mathematics (91.9%) and language arts literacy (97.9%) components of the High School Proficiency Assessment (HSPA).

In its listing of "America's Best High Schools 2016", the school was ranked 144th out of 500 best high schools in the country; it was ranked 26th among all high schools in New Jersey and 13th among the state's non-magnet schools.

In its 2013 report on "America's Best High Schools", The Daily Beast ranked the school 269th in the nation among participating public high schools and 21st among schools in New Jersey.

In 2026, the school's spring musical, Evil Dead The Musical, was nominated for 4 Basie Awards, awards given out to high school theatre productions in Monmouth County, New Jersey. The musical was nominated as a whole for best production of a musical and best set design, as well as receiving nominations for best actress in a supporting role and best featured ensemble. The musical then went on to win best actress in a supporting role and best set design. Some of the lead actors and actresses in the musical were Wyatt Zeleski as Ash, Dakota Diehl as Cheryl, William Kuskin as Jake, Mary Grace Cosgrove as Shelly, Elliot Quinn as Scott, Charlie Snider as Ed, Ava Fiore as Annie, and Sydney Schirripa as Linda

In the 2011 "Ranking America's High Schools" issue by The Washington Post, the school was ranked 51st in New Jersey and 1,606th nationwide. The school was ranked in 1,181st place, the 40th-highest in New Jersey, in Newsweek magazine's 2010 rankings of America's Best High Schools. In Newsweek's May 22, 2007 issue, ranking the country's top high schools, Rumson-Fair Haven High School was listed in 1108th place, the 35th-highest ranked school in New Jersey.

The school was the winner of the National Fed Challenge in 2004, and had done well in subsequent years, making it to the District Finals in 2005 and 2008. In 2008, Rumson-Fair Haven was defeated by Marlboro High School, although, the team put up a stellar performance.

In 2008, the school was the national winner of the Euro Challenge, an economics competition sponsored by the European Delegation to the United States and the Moody's Foundation.

== Athletics ==
The Rumson-Fair Haven Regional High School Bulldogs compete in Division A Central of the Shore Conference, an athletic conference comprised of public and private high schools in Monmouth and Ocean counties along the Jersey Shore. The league operates under the jurisdiction of the New Jersey State Interscholastic Athletic Association (NJSIAA). With 724 students in grades 10–12, the school was classified by the NJSIAA for the 2019–20 school year as Group II for most athletic competition purposes, which included schools with an enrollment of 486 to 758 students in that grade range. The school was classified by the NJSIAA as Group II South for football for 2024–2026, which included schools with 514 to 685 students.

The girls' tennis team won the Group II state championship in 1977 (against Madison High School in the final match of the playoff tournament), 1978 (vs. Tenafly High School), 1981 (vs. Haddonfield Memorial High School) and 1985 (vs. Gateway Regional High School), and won the Group I title in 1995 (vs. Cresskill High School) The 1978 team defeated Haddonfield Memorial High School in the semifinals and moved in to defeat Tenafly in the finals to win their second consecutive Group II title and 40th straight match. The 1995 team won the Group II with a 3–2 win against Pascack Hills High School in the semifinals and a 4–1 win against Gateway Regional in the finals. The team won the Central Jersey Group I tournament in 1999, beating Middlesex High School 5–0. The team came back to the sectional championship in 2004, knocking off Shore Regional High School by 4–1.

The girls gymnastics team was overall state champion in 1982.

The girls swimming team won the Division B state title in 1990, and the Public B title in 2000 and 2001. The girls' swimming team won the 2002 Public Central B Sectionals, topping Red Bank Regional High School by 111–59.

The girls' basketball team won the Group I title in 1996 (defeating Bloomfield Tech High School in the tournament's final game), and won the Group II state championship in 2002 (vs. Newton High School), 2006 and 2007 (vs. River Dell High School both years) and 2009 (vs. Chatham High School); the five state titles are tied for the tenth-most in the state. The 2001 team took the sectional title, defeating Voorhees High School, 46–29. The 2002 team won the Central Jersey Group II championship, edging Raritan High School 46–44, and then edged Newton High School by a score of 44–42 in the championship game to win the Group II state title. The 2006 team won the sectional championship over Abraham Clark High School, 41–32, then defeated River Dell by a score of 49–42 to earn the Group II state championship. The 2007 team won the Central Jersey Group II sectional championship, defeating Somerville High School, 38–30 in the final game. The team then moved on the Group II championship, facing River Dell for the second consecutive year and winning by a score of 44–23, before falling to Trenton Central High School, 48–37 in the first round of the Tournament of Champions.

The girls' cross country team won the Group I state championship in 1999 and won the Group II title in 2011, 2013 and 2015. The boys' cross country team also won the Group I title in 1999.

The boys' tennis team won the Group II state championship in 2008 (defeating Pascack Hills High School in the final match of the tournament) and 2019 (vs. Haddonfield Memorial High School). The team won the 2003 Central Jersey Group II championship, defeating Montgomery High School 3–2 in the final match. The 2005 team won the sectional championship by a 4–1 score over Shore Regional High School in the final. The 2007 team won the Central Group II title with a series of 5–0 wins over Somerville High School, New Providence High School, and ultimately Governor Livingston High School in the tournament final.

The girls' soccer team won the Group II title in 2008 (defeating Hasbrouck Heights High School in the final game of the playoffs) in 2013 (defeating Bernards High School). The team won the Central Jersey Group II title in 2002 over Burlington Township High School by a final score of 3–2. The 2007 team, seeded fourth, won the Central, Group II sectional title with a 1–0 overtime win (4–2 on penalty kicks) over second-seed Somerville High School in the tournament final. The girls' soccer team beat Delaware Valley to win the 2008 Central Jersey Group II sectional title, the first time RFH has ever won back-to-back girls' soccer titles. They went on to beat Haddonfield Memorial High School and Hasbrouck Heights High School to win the Group II state championship, the first title for the team in school history.

The girls' spring track team was Group II in 2008 (as co-champion), 2019 and 2021.

The football team has won the Central Jersey Group II state sectional championships in 2010, 2013 and 2014, and won the Central Jersey Group III sectional title in 2015, 2016 and 2018. It won its first state championship in 2010 when it defeated Matawan High School by a score of 13–7 in the Central Jersey Group II state sectional championship, finishing the season with a 9–3 record. The 2013 football team finished with an 11–1 record and won the Central Jersey Group II state sectional championship over previously undefeated Weequahic High School by a 14–6 score. In 2014, Rumson-Fair Haven defeated Delaware Valley Regional High School by a score of 21–0 to claim their third title in five years. Rumson-Fair Haven won its third straight sectional championship in 2015, when it shut out Red Bank Regional High School 21–0 to win the Central Jersey Group III title. In 2016, the team won its fourth consecutive title, winning the Central Jersey Group III state sectional championship with a 27–22 win against South Plainfield High School in the tournament final. The team won the Central Jersey Group III sectional title with a 42–35 win against Somerville High School in the champion game and won the Central / South Group III bowl game against Woodrow Wilson High School by a score of 26–18. Following the COVID-19 pandemic, the high school won two Group II sectional titles and Group II state semi-final matches in 2022 and 2023, but lost in the State Group II final each year.

The ice hockey team won the Dowd Cup in 2012 and the Handchen Cup in 2020.

The field hockey team won the Group II state championship in 2014 (defeating Madison High School in the tournament final) and 2017 (vs. Seneca High School), won the Central Jersey Group II state sectional title in 2006 and 2016, the North II Group II title in both 2012 and 2013, and the North II Group II title in 2017, 2018 and 2019. In 2006, the girls' field hockey team won its first ever state title, beating Delran High School 2–1 to win the Central Jersey Group II state sectional championship. In 2014, the field hockey team won its first-ever Shore Conference Tournament title, beating Shore Regional High School by a score of 2–0, snapping Shore's 15-year reign as Shore Conference champions. The 2014 team went on to finish 24–1–2, winning the Central Jersey, Group II championship by 8–0 against Robbinsville High School as well as the Group II state championship, the program's first group title. In 2015, Rumson-Fair Haven won its second straight Shore Conference Tournament title, beating Shore Regional 1–0 in the tournament final.

The girls track team won the Group II indoor relay championship in 2015, 2018 and 2019; the boys team won the Group II title in 2016.

The boys lacrosse team won the Group I state championship in 2015 (against Mountain Lakes High School in the playoff finals) and won the Group II title in 2022 (vs. Summit High School).

The boys' swim team won its first state sectional title in 2015, winning all 11 events and beating top-seeded Lawrence High School 95–75 in the Central Jersey Public C finals.

The boys' basketball team won the 2015 Shore Conference Tournament championship, defeating Christian Brothers Academy 50–24. Tied 19–19 at halftime against top-seeded CBA, eleventh-seeded Rumson-Fair Haven exploded in the second half to outscore their opponent 31–5 and take home the title. Brendan Barry scored 27 points in the contest, en route to winning Shore Conference Player of the Year. The game has been called the "Greatest upset in Shore Conference Tournament Finals History".

The girls' lacrosse team won the Group II state championship in 2016 (defeating Bernards High School in the tournament finals) and 2021 (vs. Summit High School). The 2016 girls lacrosse team won the Group II title against Bernards High School, with a 14–11 victory in the tournament final at Kean University.

The girls' track team won the winter / indoor Group II state title in 2018 and 2019.

The boys' spring / outdoor track team won the Group II state championship in 2021.

The wrestling program won their first Group II championship in 2024 and repeated the following two seasons, in 2025 and 2026. In 2023, the program had its first state champion, when Hudson Skove won the state wrestling championship at 215 lbs. The following season in 2024, Sonny Amato became the second state champion in school history, winning the state title at 144 lbs. and won again in 2026 at 150 lbs.

== Coronavirus aid fundraising event ==
On April 26, 2020, two RFH students, teamed up by live streaming and raising money for Jersey Shore University Medical Center while one student was running a marathon on his treadmill, which he completed at 5 hours 21 minutes and 35 seconds, his partner, as described by many media outlets, acted as the "hype man" and "entertainer" throughout the near six-hour live stream. Within three days of the live stream ending, Governor Phil Murphy gave the two RFH students shout outs during his own daily live stream. Later that day, WNBC 4 New York heard the story and the segment was aired on April 29, 2020. The students decided to take the negative experience of the pandemic outbreak and make it into a positive with the live stream and as of April 30, 2020, the duo has raised over $6,000. Additionally, in April 2020 toward the beginning of the COVID-19 pandemic, ten Rumson Fair Haven students (juniors and seniors) began collecting food donations to help families in the Monmouth County area who had lost their jobs or had been unable to receive food due to the pandemic. After a few weeks of food donations they turned their mission into a non-profit organization called Companeros de Comida which as of June 2020 they have raised over $30,000, served over 20,000 meals, and helped seven families achieve food security.

== Administration ==
Core members of the school's administration are:

- Lee McDonald, Superintendent
- Sean Cranston, business administrator and board secretary
- Stephen Sarles, principal

== Board of education ==
The district's board of education, comprised of nine members, sets policy and oversees the fiscal and educational operation of the district through its administration. As a Type II school district, the board's trustees are elected directly by voters to serve three-year terms of office on a staggered basis, with three seats up for election each year held (since 2012) as part of the November general election. The board appoints a superintendent to oversee the district's day-to-day operations and a business administrator to supervise the business functions of the district. Seats on the board of education are allocated based on the population of the constituent municipalities, with five seats assigned to Rumson and four to Fair Haven.

== Notable alumni ==
- Katie Coyle (born 1986, class of 2004), author of the Vivian Apple series of young adult novels
- Schuyler DeBree (born 1996), professional soccer player who plays as a defender for North Carolina Courage of the National Women's Soccer League
- Bill Finegan (1917–2008, class of 1935), arranger for the Glenn Miller Orchestra and other bandleaders
- Midori Francis (born 1994, class of 2012), actress featured in Good Boys and Dash & Lily
- Jacquelyn Jablonski (born 1991, class of 2009), fashion model who has walked at shows including the Victoria's Secret Fashion Show
- Adrienne-Joi Johnson (born 1963, class of 1981), actress, who appeared in House Party and Baby Boy
- Connor Jaeger (born 1991, class of 2010), swimmer who competed at the 2012 Summer Olympics
- Deborah Lee James (born 1958, class of 1976), 23rd Secretary of the United States Air Force, and businesswoman
- Brian Kelly (born 1954), journalist and author who has been the editor and chief content officer of U.S. News & World Report since 2007
- Phyllis Stadler Lyon, former field hockey player who played on the U.S. women's national field hockey team
- Rob Margolies (born 1983, class of 2001), film director and screenwriter
- Rob Petitti (born 1982, class of 2000), former offensive tackle for the New Orleans Saints, St. Louis Rams and Carolina Panthers of the NFL.
- Charlie Puth (born 1991, class of 2010), singer/songwriter/producer whose vocals and piano playing are featured on Wiz Khalifa's single "See You Again"
- Nelson Riddle (1921–1985, class of 1939), longtime orchestrator for pop singers including Frank Sinatra and Linda Ronstadt
- Henry Selick (born 1952, class of 1970), stop motion director
- Bonnard J. Teegarden (born 1940, class of 1958), astrophysicist formerly with NASA's Goddard Space Flight Center, best known for leading the team that discovered Teegarden's star in 2003
- Charlie Volker (born 1997), bobsledder who represented the United States in the two-man bobsleigh event and in the four-man event at the 2022 Winter Olympics
- Jay Weinberg (born 1990, class of 2008), metal/punk/substitute E Street Band drummer and Slipknot drummer
- Phillip Wheeler (born 2002), professional basketball player for the Philadelphia 76ers
