= Jacquelyn Jablonski =

American model (born 1991)

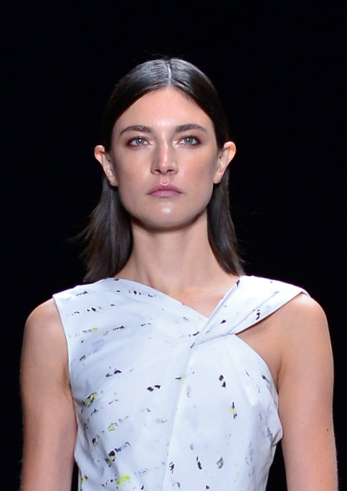
- Jablonski in 2014
- Born: Jacquelyn Leigh Jablonski; April 4, 1991 (age 35); Fair Haven, New Jersey, U.S.
- Occupation: Model
- Years active: 2007–present
- Modeling information
- Height: 1.78 m (5 ft 10 in)
- Hair color: Brown
- Eye color: Green
- Agency: The Society Management (New York); Elite Model Management (Paris, Milan); Unique Models (Copenhagen); A Management (Hamburg); Premier Model Management (London)

Jacquelyn Leigh Jablonski (born April 4, 1991) is an American fashion model. Jablonski is also a spokesperson for Autism, having established her own organization in 2016 called "Autism Tomorrow".

== Early life ==
Jablonski, who is of Polish, German, and Irish descent, grew up in Fair Haven, New Jersey and graduated from Rumson-Fair Haven High School in 2008.

She was scouted at a café where she worked. When she was 15, her mother took her to agencies in New York City, where Ford Models immediately offered a contract. In September 2007, Jablonski walked her first fashion show in New York for Brian Reyes. Shortly after, she participated at Ford's Supermodel of the World and finished 2nd runner-up tied with competitor Alexina Graham from the United Kingdom.

== Career ==
Jablonski skipped both fashion weeks in the 2009-season to focus on school but still accepted some modeling assignments like walking the Emanuel Ungaro pre-fall show in January 2009. In September 2009, she walked 58 shows during the Spring/Summer 2010 season, which meant her breakthrough in the fashion industry. She went on to become the most booked model during New York Fashion Week in the next season, walking 31 shows. Her runway credits include Shiatzy Chen, Prada, Balenciaga, YSL, Valentino, Chanel, and 2010, 2011, 2012, 2013, 2014, and 2015 Victoria's Secret Fashion Show.

In 2009, Jablonski booked her first major ad campaign for Calvin Klein. Jablonski always presents in the campaigns of Tommy Hilfiger. She has furthermore appeared in campaigns for Givenchy, Hermès, Pucci, J Crew, Max Mara, H&M, Emporio Armani, GAP, Dolce & Gabbana, Sportmax, Céline, Hogan, Burberry, Carolina Herrera, Yves Saint Laurent, Stefanel, and lingerie brand Victoria's Secret.

In print media, she has appeared on the cover of Latin American and Turkish Vogue and has appeared in editorials for American and Spanish Harper's Bazaar, Numéro, i-D, V, Another Magazine, Pop Magazine, Dazed & Confused, German, Teen, American, Russian, Japanese, Turkish, Latin American, Italian, and French Vogue, and W, and Lookbooks for Prada, Alexander Wang, Hogan, Jason Wu, Fendi, J.Crew, Tommy Hilfiger, and John Galliano.

The night before December 4, 2012, airing the annual Victoria's Secret Fashion Show of the fashion show, Jablonski and fellow Victoria's Secret models Behati Prinsloo and Jasmine Tookes guest starred on the December 3 "Ha'awe Make Loa" episode of CBS' Hawaii Five-0.
