= Starvation Island =

Island in New Jersey, United States

Starvation Island (The Island)

Starvation Island (also known as Mohawk Island) on the Navesink River in Rumson, New Jersey was a small (approximately 2.5 acres (1.0 ha)) island located between Sea Bright and Barley Point. Early in the 20th century, it was inhabited by Red Bank oysterman George Frick and fisherman Thomas Schwindt, and then other families began to build bungalows. At various times from the early 1900s to the 1970s there were between 10 and 13 bungalows. The families who stayed there (the Schwindt's, the Knop's, the Ruland's, the Wyballie's, the Stevenson's, the Humphry's, the Healey's, the Basse's, the Blade's, the Katire's, the Fagan's to name a few) would arrive in early summer and stay until early September. They referred to it as "The Island". There was no electricity or running water. The only way to reach the island was by boat, or at low tide when you could make the trek from where Navesink Avenue dead-ended into the river (or as the islanders called it "the end of the road"). The families lived with the bare necessities and enjoyed the island life, which included clamming, crabbing, fishing, and boating. The bungalows burned in a fire in 1973, the source of which remains unclear.
