= Bonnard J. Teegarden =

American astrophysicist (born 1940)

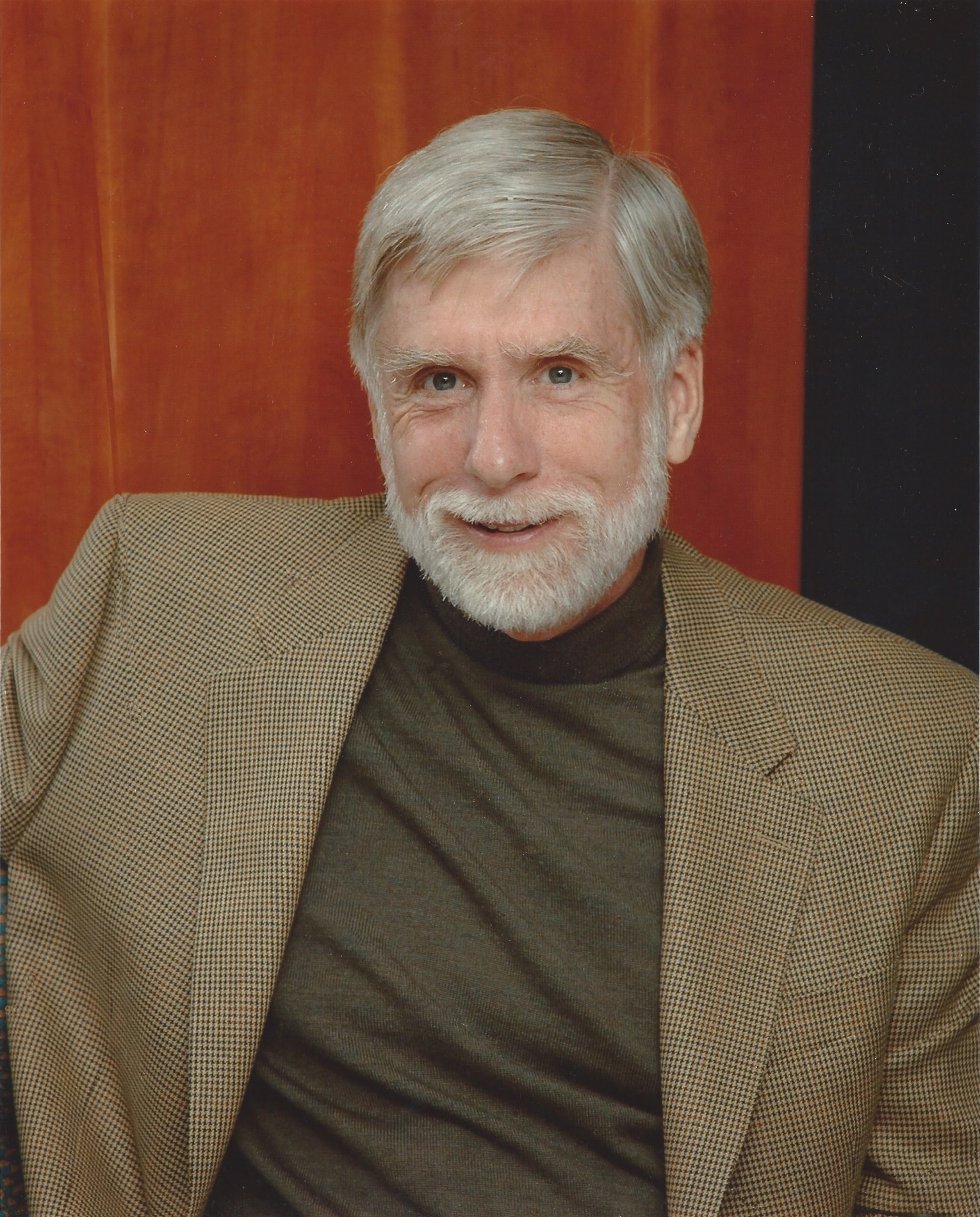
- Bonnard J. Teegarden.
- Born: August 23, 1940 (age 85)
- Occupations: Physicist; Astrophysicist; Astronomer
- Known for: discovery of Teegarden's Star

Bonnard John Teegarden (born August 23, 1940) is an American astrophysicist formerly with NASA's Goddard Space Flight Center, now retired. He spent most of his career studying cosmic gamma rays and is best known to the public for leading the team that discovered Teegarden's star in 2003.

== Education ==
Teegarden grew up in Fair Haven, New Jersey and graduated from Rumson-Fair Haven Regional High School in Rumson in 1958. He earned a Bachelor of Science from the Massachusetts Institute of Technology in 1962 and a Doctor of Philosophy from the University of Maryland in 1967. His thesis was "A Study of Low Energy Galactic Cosmic Rays" and his advisor was Frank B. McDonald.

== Career ==
=== The discovery of Teegarden's star ===
The discovery of Teegarden's star came as somewhat of a surprise as no close-by stars had been discovered for many decades. Teegarden's team found this star in data taken years earlier by an unrelated program searching for near-Earth asteroids. The real excitement was from the initial measurements the team made for the parallax of this star. These initial measurements indicated that the star may be very close at a distance of about seven light-years. This would have made it the third-closest star system. This excitement resulted in numerous popular press articles and public interest. In the years since the discovery was announced the measured distances gradually increased. The accepted distance is now more than twelve light-years and public interest has faded somewhat, but not before Teegarden was rewarded with the name of this newly discovered star, although other designations are sometimes used as well.

=== Other work ===
Teegarden was a cosmic ray researcher at NASA's Goddard Space Flight Center for all of his professional life. He was co-investigator on the Pioneer Jupiter cosmic ray experiments and later an investigator on the space based INTEGRAL and BATSE experiments. He was also involved in studies of stellar nucleosynthesis. He is a prolific researcher with 200 articles listed in SAO/NASA Astrophysics Data System.

== Personal life ==
After retiring from NASA Teegarden and his wife moved to Annapolis, Maryland. He now works wood, and sails. He has developed special software for making decorative wooden bowls.

== See also ==
- Stars named after people
