= Katie Coyle =

American writer

- Born: c. 1986 (age 39–40)
- Education: Marymount Manhattan College; University of Pittsburgh (MFA)
- Occupation: Writer
- Known for: Vivian Apple series
- Awards: Pushcart Prize (2016)

Katie Coyle (born c. 1986) is an American writer. She is the author of the Vivian Apple series of young adult (YA) novels.

== Early life ==
Coyle grew up in Fair Haven, New Jersey, graduating in 2004 from Rumson-Fair Haven Regional High School. She attended Marymount Manhattan College, majoring in English, then earned an MFA in fiction from the University of Pittsburgh.

== Career ==
=== Vivian Apple series ===
Coyle's Vivian Apple books follow the 16-year-old protagonist as she remains on earth after an apparent rapture in which thousands of adults disappear, including her parents. The first Vivian Apple book was published in the UK in 2013 by Hot Key Books as Vivian Versus the Apocalypse. Coyle began writing the novel while in graduate school; she first developed the character in a short story for her MFA program. Coyle learned of the Young Writer’s Prize, sponsored by Hot Key and The Guardian, for an unrepresented author under 25 and entered the competition in 2012 primarily as incentive to make progress on her draft; ultimately she won the prize, a publishing deal worth 10,000 British pounds. In 2014, Rolling Stone named Vivian Versus the Apocalypse to a list of the 40 "most essential" books of the YA genre and the novel was republished in the US by Houghton Mifflin Harcourt in 2014 under the title Vivian Apple at the End of the World. A sequel followed in 2015, also with Houghton Mifflin Harcourt, entitled Vivian Apple Needs a Miracle. Cosmopolitan named Vivian Apple Needs a Miracle to a 2015 list of "24 New Books Every Twentysomething Woman Needs to Read This Fall".

=== Other projects ===
In 2015, Coyle's story "Fear Itself", originally written in graduate school and published in One Story, was collected in the Best American Nonrequired Reading anthology. The story was also awarded a 2016 Pushcart Prize.
