= Charlie Volker =

American bobsledder and football player

Personal information
- Full name: Charles Volker
- Nationality: American
- Born: May 23, 1997 (age 29)
- Home town: Fair Haven, New Jersey, U.S.
- Height: 6 ft 0 in (183 cm)
- Weight: 220 lb (100 kg)

Sport
- Country: United States
- Sport: Bobsleigh, American football, track
- Event(s): Two-man, four-man (bobsleigh)
- College team: Princeton (football)
Medal record
Representing United States
Bobsleigh
World Cup
Bronze medal – third place	2022 Winterberg	Four-man

Charlie Volker (born May 23, 1997) is an American bobsledder and former football running back. He played college football at Princeton and became a bobsledder after not making the NFL. Volker competed in the two-man bobsleigh event and in the four-man event at the 2022 Winter Olympics.

== Early life and football career ==
Volker was born on May 23, 1997, and grew up in Fair Haven, New Jersey. He attended Rumson-Fair Haven Regional High School. As a junior in 2013, Volker ran for 2,102 yards and scored 24 touchdowns, helping the team win the NJSIAA championship game. As a senior in 2014, he captained his team and was named all-state after placing second in the state with 2,108 rushing yards. He won the Dwight D. Eisenhower Award that year and was named Monmouth County Player of the Year.

At Rumson-Fair Haven, Volker also competed in track, being team captain and winning the state championship in the 100 metres. He was an all-state honoree and won county championships in the 100 metres and 200 metres.

In August 2014, Volker announced his commitment to Princeton University. In his freshman year on the football team, he ran 26 times for 145 yards and made one reception for 20 yards. He was named Ivy League Rookie of the Week for his performance against Colgate, in which he scored a 62-yard rushing touchdown.

As a sophomore in 2016, Volker led the school with 574 rushing yards, helping them win the conference championship. He was selected to the conference honor roll following a game against Lehigh, where he scored three touchdowns on 13 rushes, gaining 82 yards.

Volker was named second-team all-conference in 2017 after posting 600 rushing yards and 14 touchdowns, the latter being second-best in the Ivy League. Against Brown, he ran for 163 yards and scored four touchdowns, including an all-time team-long 96-yard rushing score.

As a senior, Volker was named first-team all-conference after making 97 rush attempts for 675 yards and 14 touchdowns. He finished his Princeton career with 1994 rushing yards, a number that was the seventh-most in school history at the time of his graduation.

Volker went unselected in the 2019 NFL draft. In 2020, he received a mini-camp invite to the National Football League (NFL), but it was canceled due to COVID-19. He subsequently gave up dreams of becoming a professional football player.

== Bobsleigh career ==
"One of the trainers there [at the minicamp] had been a bobsledder, though, and he said to me, 'you know, you're the right type of athlete for the sport,'" Volker said. At the trainer's suggestion, Volker uploaded videos of his athletic highlights to the USA Bobsled and Skeleton's digital combine. Shortly afterward, he received an invite for an in-person workout with a US bobsleigh coach. He described his first time riding in a bobsleigh as "like being in a washing machine ... I was so dizzy." He eventually made the team of Sled 2, which is team B of national US bobsleigh.

In 2022, Volker made the US World Cup team and finished with the bronze medal at the Bobsleigh World Cup in Winterberg, Germany, with a time of 1:49.54, four-hundredths of a second behind silver winner Great Britain.

Volker was later named to the US Team that competed at the 2022 Winter Olympics in Beijing. At the two-man event, Volker, paired up with Hunter Church, finished in 27th place with a time of 3:02.31. In the four-man event, Volker was part of the team that finished in 10th place with a time of 3:57.06.
