= Fisk Chapel =

Historic church in New Jersey, United States

- U.S. National Register of Historic Places
- New Jersey Register of Historic Places
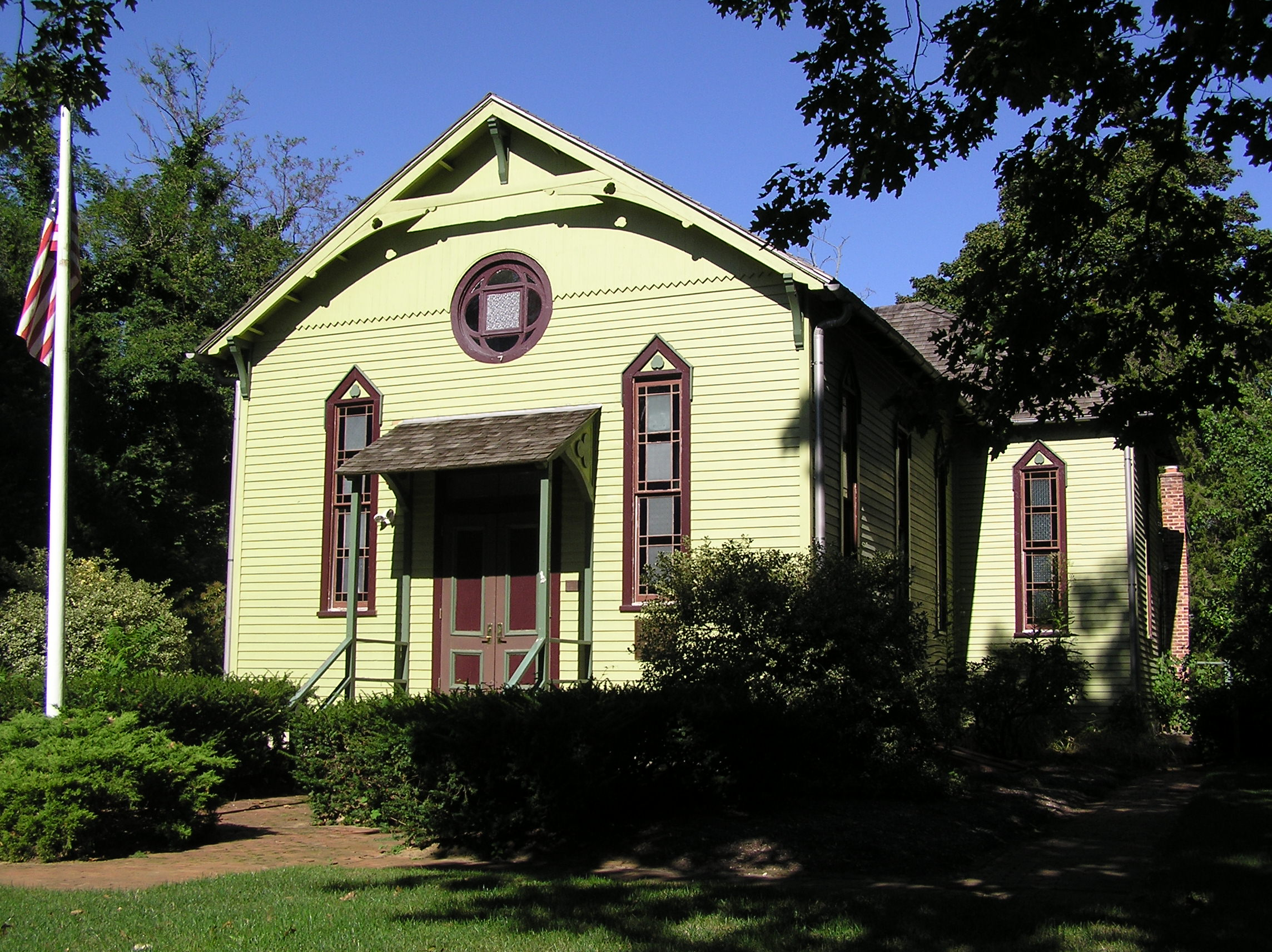

- Location within Monmouth County, New Jersey Location within New Jersey Location within the United States
- Location: Cedar Avenue, Fair Haven, New Jersey
- Coordinates: 40°21′38″N 74°2′28″W
- Area: 1 acre (0.40 ha)
- Built: 1882
- NRHP reference No.: 75001146
- NJRHP No.: 1970

Significant dates
- Added to NRHP: October 29, 1975
- Designated NJRHP: July 21, 1979

Fisk Chapel (also known as A.M.E. Bethel Chapel) is a historic cruciform chapel on Cedar Avenue in Fair Haven, Monmouth County, New Jersey, United States.

It was built in 1882 in the Carpenter Gothic style for the town's African-American community and added to the National Register of Historic Places in 1975, upon the congregation's relocation to a newer building.
