= Fair Haven Public Schools =

School district in Monmouth County, New Jersey, US

- District offices within Knollwood School

Address
- 224 Hance Road Fair Haven, Monmouth County, New Jersey, 07704; United States
- Coordinates: 40.359702°N 74.037091°W

District information
- Grades: PreK to 8
- Superintendent: Sean McNeil
- Business administrator: Frank Gripp
- Schools: 2

Students and staff
- Enrollment: 964 (as of 2022–23)
- Faculty: 105.0 FTEs
- Student–teacher ratio: 9.2:1

Other information
- District Factor Group: I
- Website: www.fairhaven.edu
| Ind. | Per pupil | District spending | Rank (*) | K-8 average | %± vs. average |
|---|---|---|---|---|---|
| 1A | Total Spending | $14,581 | 9 | $18,891 | −22.8% |
| 1 | Budgetary Cost | 12,196 | 16 | 14,159 | −13.9% |
| 2 | Classroom Instruction | 7,652 | 17 | 8,659 | −11.6% |
| 6 | Support Services | 1,772 | 19 | 2,167 | −18.2% |
| 8 | Administrative Cost | 1,155 | 5 | 1,547 | −25.3% |
| 10 | Operations & Maintenance | 1,559 | 45 | 1,612 | −3.3% |
| 13 | Extracurricular Activities | 59 | 15 | 104 | −43.3% |
| 16 | Median Teacher Salary | 53,682 | 9 | 61,136 |
Data from NJDoE 2014 Taxpayers' Guide to Education Spending. *Of K-8 districts with more than 750 students. Lowest spending=1; Highest=84

The Fair Haven Public Schools is a comprehensive community public school district that serves students in pre-kindergarten through eighth grade from Fair Haven, in Monmouth County, in the U.S. state of New Jersey.

As of the 2022–23 school year, the district, comprised of two schools, had an enrollment of 964 students and 105.0 classroom teachers (on an FTE basis), for a student–teacher ratio of 9.2:1.

The district is classified by the New Jersey Department of Education as being in District Factor Group "I", the second-highest of eight groupings. District Factor Groups organize districts statewide to allow comparison by common socioeconomic characteristics of the local districts. From lowest socioeconomic status to highest, the categories are A, B, CD, DE, FG, GH, I and J.

Students in public school for ninth through twelfth grades attend Rumson-Fair Haven Regional High School, together with students from Rumson, where the school is located. As of the 2022–23 school year, the high school had an enrollment of 876 students and 83.8 classroom teachers (on an FTE basis), for a student–teacher ratio of 10.5:1. In 2016, Newsweek ranked RFH the 144th best high school in the United States.

== Schools ==
Schools in the district (with 2022–23 enrollment data from the National Center for Education Statistics) are:

- Viola L. Sickles School with 452 students in grades PreK–3
  - Marilyn Schwartz, principal
- Knollwood School with 504 students in grades 4–8
  - Amy Romano, principal

== Administration ==
Core members of the district's administration are:

- Sean McNeil, superintendent
- Frank Gripp, business administrator and board secretary

== Board of education ==
The district's board of education, comprised of nine members, sets policy and oversees the fiscal and educational operation of the district through its administration. As a Type II school district, the board's trustees are elected directly by voters to serve three-year terms of office on a staggered basis, with three seats up for election each year held (since 2012) as part of the November general election. The board appoints a superintendent to oversee the district's day-to-day operations and a business administrator to supervise the business functions of the district.
