= Navesink River =

River in New Jersey

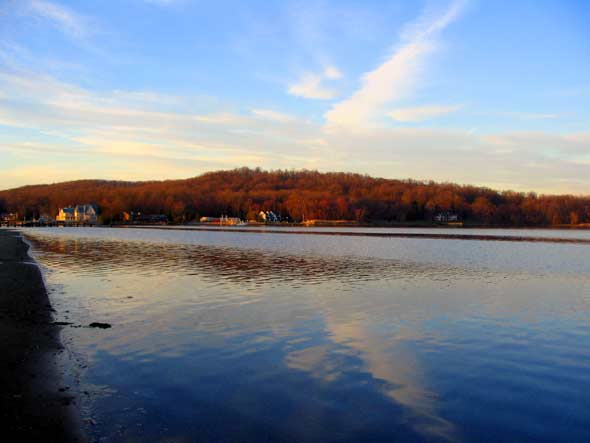
- The Navesink River in autumn

- Location in the United States Location in New Jersey
- Location: New Jersey
- Coordinates: 40.372°N 74.037°W
- Type: Estuary

The Navesink River is an estuary in the eastern United States in Monmouth County, New Jersey. Approximately eight miles (13 km) in length, it is surrounded by the communities of Middletown (including the namesake Navesink CDP), Red Bank, Fair Haven, and Rumson.

Known officially as the North Shrewsbury River and upstream of Red Bank as the Swimming River, it is formed southwest of Red Bank by the confluence of the Swimming River with several smaller streams. It extends ENE along the north side of Red Bank, connecting to the Shrewsbury River estuary at Rumson, approximately one mile (1.6 km) south of the entrance of the Shrewsbury River into Sandy Hook Bay near Highlands.

== History ==
The area was originally populated by the Lenni Lenape people. In 1665, John Hance was one of the settlers who negotiated with the Navesinks of the Lenni Lenape to purchase the lands of this peninsula and the immediate surroundings through the Monmouth Patent. Following the founding of Red Bank in 1736 (named after its situation on the "red banks" of the Navesink River), the river was important for transportation from the Navesink River communities to New York City and was served by side-wheeler steamboats until the 1950s.

== The Navesink today ==
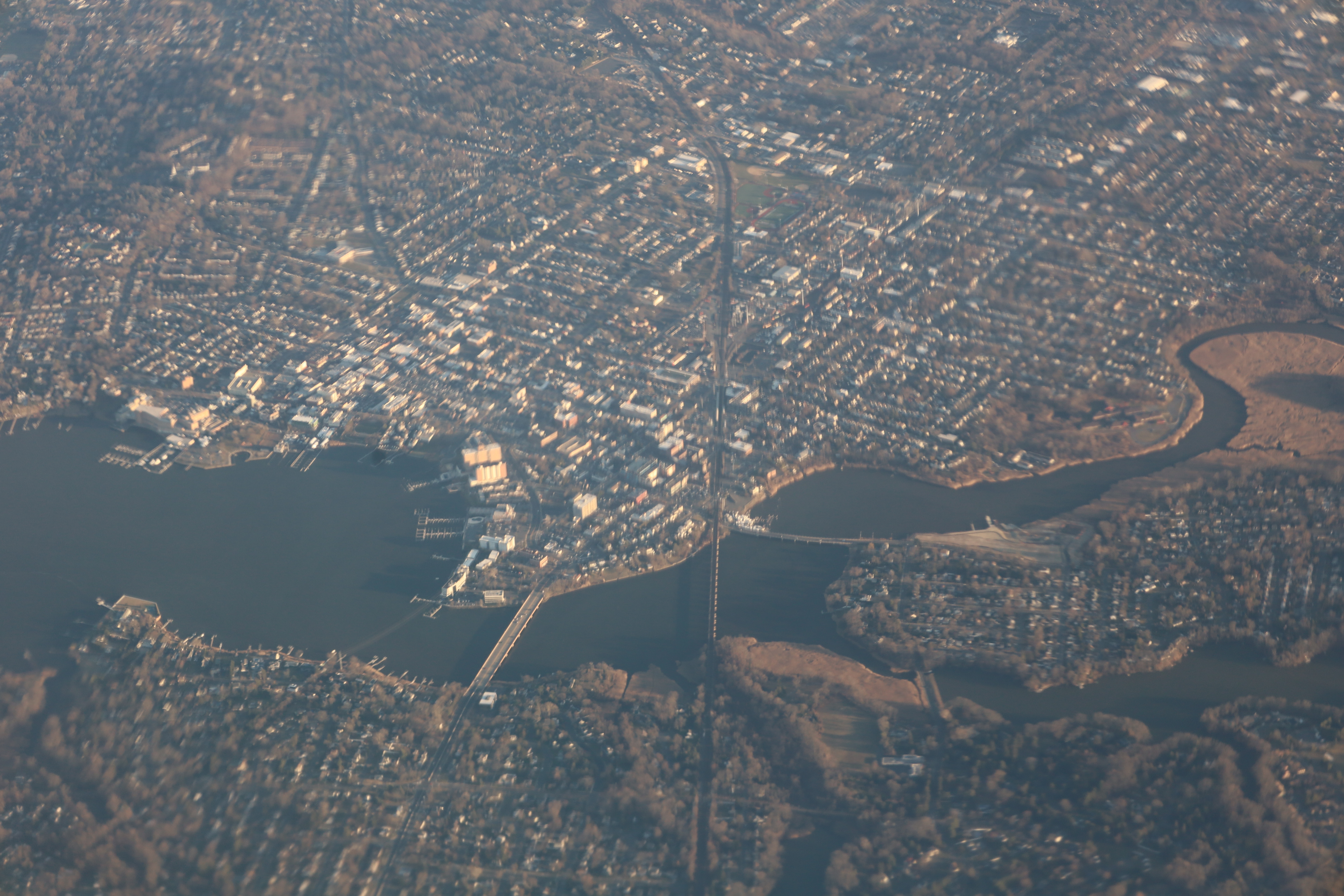
Aerial view of the river by Red Bank, New Jersey in 2023

Today the river is a major recreational resource for powerboating, crabbing, fishing, sailing, canoeing, kayaking, bird watching, swimming, and rowing. During particularly cold winters, the Navesink can freeze, adding ice skating and ice boating to the list of recreations available. The area along the Navesink banks is one of the most affluent in New Jersey. Today, the town of Red Bank rests situated on its banks, with hotels and apartment buildings that offer scenic views of the river. Select homes in Red Bank, Fair Haven, and Rumson share similar views.

As a tidal estuary flowing into the Shrewsbury River at Sea Bright, continuing into Sandy Hook Bay and ultimately the Atlantic Ocean, the Navesink provides excellent and scenic fishing opportunities for species such as bluefish (smaller bluefish are known as snappers), striped bass, weakfish and fluke, blackfish, pufferfish, kingfish, spot especially in the spring and fall. Crabbing is particularly popular in the upstream Swimming River section.

== Independence Day fireworks ==
Each year from 1960 through 2011, a fireworks display was launched from the river close to Red Bank on July 3, the eve of Independence Day. "KaBoomFest" was held in Marine Park, where local bands and vendors formed a major gathering.

== Dolphins ==
The Navesink River was the home to a pod of up to 16 Atlantic bottlenose dolphins from June 2008 into the winter of that year. They are thought to have followed a school of baitfish from the Sandy Hook Bay. The dolphins attracted nearby residents to view them, as well as media attention. Local authorities enforced a requirement on marine traffic to maintain a safe distance from the pod, and even issued tickets to boats that were deemed hazardous to the dolphins' safety.

In late September 2008, one of the dolphins had been found washed up on the shore, and it was determined that its cause of death was pneumonia. Several days later, another was found floating down the river. Another group of Atlantic bottlenose dolphins reappeared in August 2012 near the Oceanic Bridge.

== See also ==
- Starvation Island
- List of New Jersey rivers
