= Fair Haven, New Jersey =

Borough in Monmouth County, New Jersey, US

- Borough
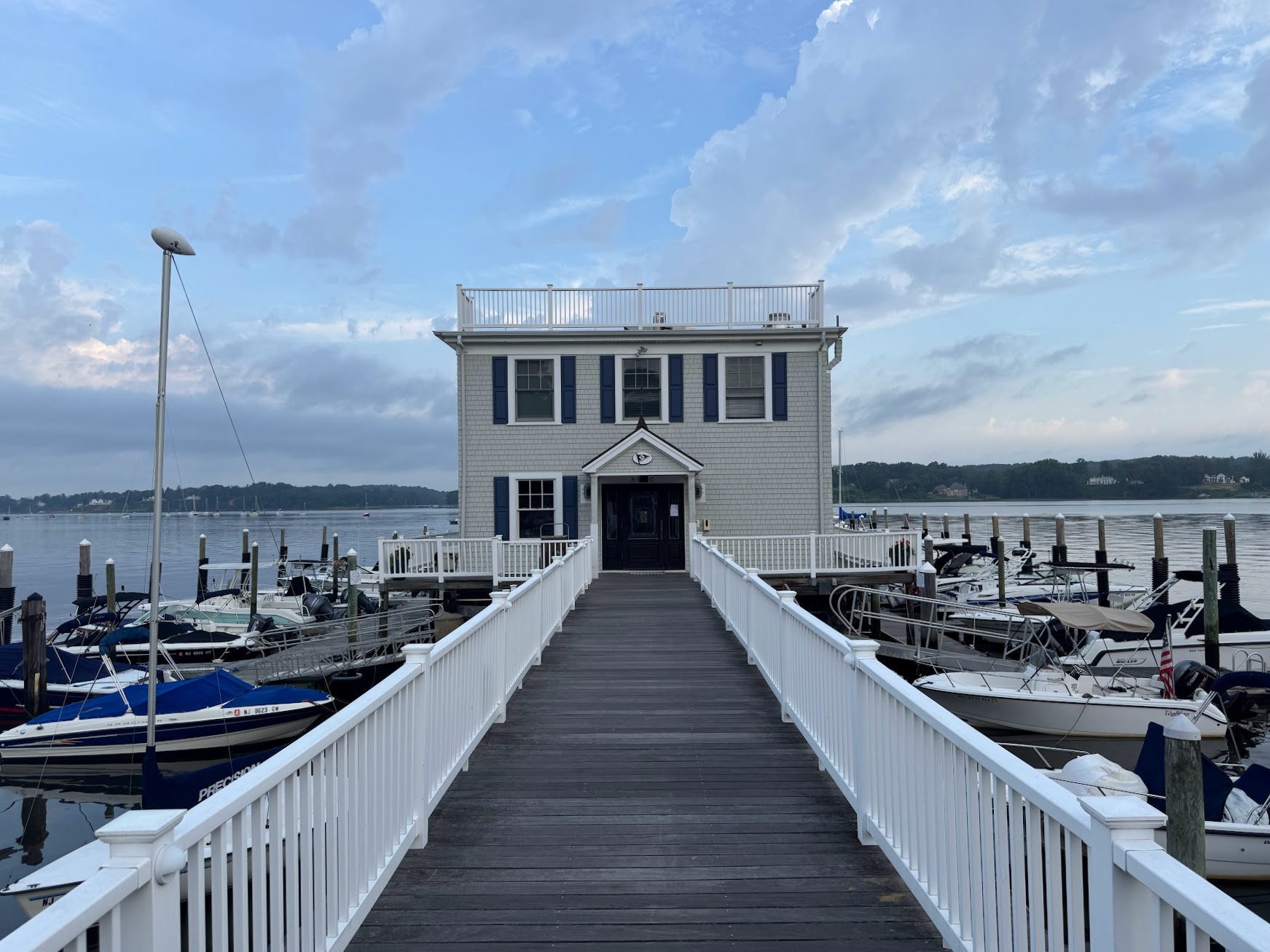
- The Players Boat Club on the Navesink River in Fair Haven

- Seal

- Location of Fair Haven in Monmouth County highlighted in red (left). Inset map: Location of Monmouth County in New Jersey highlighted in orange (right).

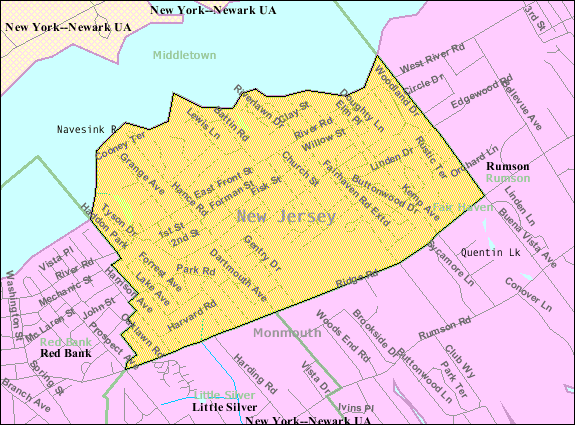
- Census Bureau map of Fair Haven, New Jersey

- Location in Monmouth County Location in New Jersey Location in the United States
- Coordinates: 40.36194°N 74.038775°W
- Country: United States
- State: New Jersey
- County: Monmouth
- Incorporated: April 23, 1912

Government
  - Type: Borough
  - Body: Borough Council
  - Mayor: Joshua Halpern (R, term ends December 31, 2026)
  - Administrator: Christopher J. York
  - Municipal clerk: Allyson Cinquegrana

Area
  - Total: 2.11 sq mi (5.47 km^{2})
  - Land: 1.59 sq mi (4.13 km^{2})
  - Water: 0.52 sq mi (1.34 km^{2}) 24.55%
  - Rank: 401st of 565 in state 29th of 53 in county
- Elevation: 20 ft (6.1 m)

Population (2020)
  - Total: 6,269
  - Estimate (2023): 6,109
  - Rank: 336th of 565 in state 26th of 53 in county
  - Density: 3,935.3/sq mi (1,519.4/km^{2})
  - Rank: 162nd of 565 in state 17th of 53 in county
- Time zone: UTC−05:00 (Eastern (EST))
  - Summer (DST): UTC−04:00 (Eastern (EDT))
- ZIP Code: 07704
- Area code: 732
- FIPS code: 3402522440
- GNIS feature ID: 0885213
- Website: www.fairhavennj.org

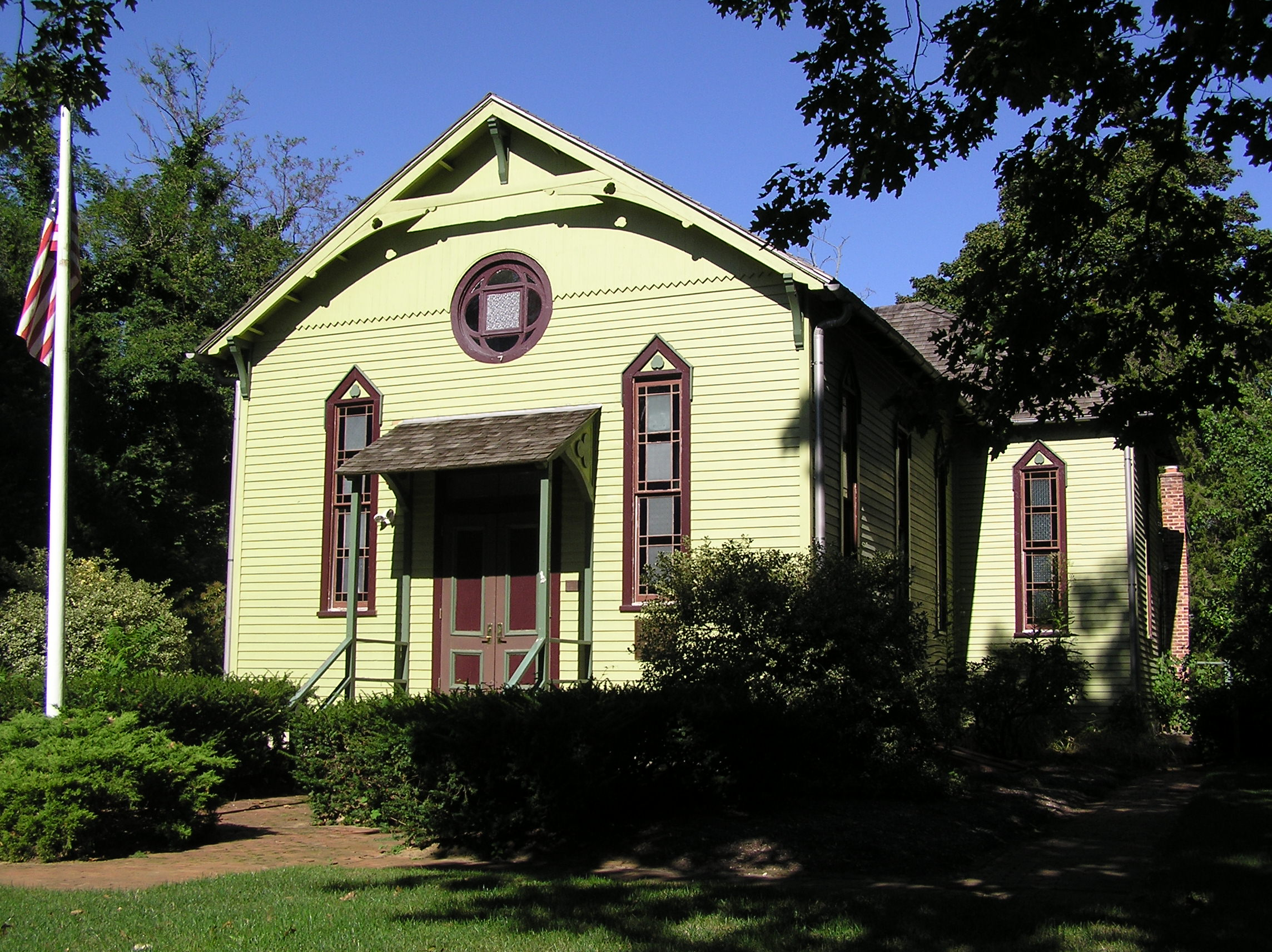
Fisk Chapel

Fair Haven is a borough situated in the Jersey Shore region within Monmouth County, in the U.S. state of New Jersey, in the New York metropolitan area. Fair Haven is located on the Rumson peninsula along the Navesink River and is bordered by Red Bank and Little Silver to the west. As of the 2020 United States census, the borough's population was 6,269, its highest decennial count ever and an increase of 148 (+2.4%) from the 2010 census count of 6,121, which in turn reflected an increase of 184 (+3.1%) from the 5,937 counted in the 2000 census.

Fair Haven was incorporated as a borough by an act of the New Jersey Legislature on March 28, 1912, from portions of Shrewsbury Township, subject to the results of a referendum held on April 23, 1912. Portions of the borough were exchanged with Red Bank on June 17, 1957.

The borough has been one of the state's highest-income communities. In the 2013–2017 American Community Survey, Fair Haven had a median household income of $158,264 (ranked 23rd in the state) and included 36.6% of households earning more than $200,000 annually.

In 2012, Forbes.com listed Fair Haven as 355th in its listing of "America's Most Expensive ZIP Codes", with a median home price of $804,446. In 2018, New Jersey Business Magazine listed Fair Haven as 25th in its listing of "The Most Expensive ZIP Codes in New Jersey", with a median sale price 2017 of $745,000

== History ==
Fair Haven's first permanent settlement dates to a structure built in 1816 at the Navesink River near today's Fair Haven Road. By the mid-19th century, steamboats stopped at "Chandler's Dock" on a route between Red Bank and New York City, bringing visitors to the area and local oysters to the city. Fisk Chapel was rebuilt in 1882 to accommodate the borough's African American population.

The steamship "Albertina" is depicted on the Borough seal. It was built in 1882 by Lawrence & Foulks.

Fair Haven has an annual Fireman's Fair during the last weekend of summer including Labor Day weekend which attracts a couple of thousand people, including noted musicians Bruce Springsteen and Bon Jovi. The Fair Haven Fireman's Fair also has a Fireman's night and invites all firefighters from any other firehouse to come and join in the festivities. The Fireman's Fair used to raffle off a car each year, but most attendees already had their own cars and the decision was made in the 1990s to switch to a 50/50 raffle whose prize can be in the tens of thousands of dollars. The fair is on the Fire Company grounds.

== Geography ==
According to the United States Census Bureau, the borough had a total area of 2.11 square miles (5.47 km^{2}), including 1.59 square miles (4.13 km^{2}) of land and 0.52 square miles (1.34 km^{2}) of water (24.55%).

The borough borders the Monmouth County communities of Little Silver, Middletown Township, Red Bank and Rumson.

== Demographics ==
Historical population
Census	Pop.	Note	%±
1920	1,295		—
1930	2,260		74.5%
1940	2,491		10.2%
1950	3,560		42.9%
1960	5,678		59.5%
1970	6,142		8.2%
1980	5,679		−7.5%
1990	5,270		−7.2%
2000	5,937		12.7%
2010	6,121		3.1%
2020	6,269		2.4%
2023 (est.)	6,109	▼	−2.6%
Population sources: 1920 1920–1930; 1940–2000 2000; 2010 2020

=== 2020 census ===
As of the 2020 census, Fair Haven had a population of 6,269. The median age was 40.1 years. 31.4% of residents were under the age of 18 and 12.4% of residents were 65 years of age or older. For every 100 females there were 98.2 males, and for every 100 females age 18 and over there were 94.3 males age 18 and over.

99.9% of residents lived in urban areas, while 1 resident lived in rural areas.

There were 1,994 households in Fair Haven, of which 50.2% had children under the age of 18 living in them. Of all households, 74.6% were married-couple households, 7.2% were households with a male householder and no spouse or partner present, and 16.0% were households with a female householder and no spouse or partner present. About 12.6% of all households were made up of individuals and 7.5% had someone living alone who was 65 years of age or older.

There were 2,074 housing units, of which 3.9% were vacant. The homeowner vacancy rate was 1.4% and the rental vacancy rate was 5.8%.

Racial composition as of the 2020 census
Race	Number	Percent
White	5,724	91.3%
Black or African American	67	1.1%
American Indian and Alaska Native	6	0.1%
Asian	93	1.5%
Native Hawaiian and Other Pacific Islander	0	0.0%
Some other race	31	0.5%
Two or more races	348	5.6%
Hispanic or Latino (of any race)	241	3.8%

=== 2010 census ===
The 2010 United States census counted 6,121 people, 1,970 households, and 1,659 families in the borough. The population density was 3,832.5 per square mile (1,479.7/km^{2}). There were 2,065 housing units at an average density of 1,292.9 per square mile (499.2/km^{2}). The racial makeup was 94.63% (5,792) White, 2.50% (153) Black or African American, 0.10% (6) Native American, 1.08% (66) Asian, 0.10% (6) Pacific Islander, 0.44% (27) from other races, and 1.16% (71) from two or more races. Hispanic or Latino of any race were 2.70% (165) of the population.

Of the 1,970 households, 51.4% had children under the age of 18; 73.6% were married couples living together; 8.5% had a female householder with no husband present and 15.8% were non-families. Of all households, 13.8% were made up of individuals and 7.3% had someone living alone who was 65 years of age or older. The average household size was 3.11 and the average family size was 3.45.

34.4% of the population were under the age of 18, 4.9% from 18 to 24, 20.5% from 25 to 44, 30.7% from 45 to 64, and 9.6% who were 65 years of age or older. The median age was 39.3 years. For every 100 females, the population had 96.7 males. For every 100 females ages 18 and older there were 91.7 males.

The Census Bureau's 2006–2010 American Community Survey showed that (in 2010 inflation-adjusted dollars) median household income was $112,308 (with a margin of error of +/− $18,209) and the median family income was $113,546 (+/− $18,045). Males had a median income of $109,643 (+/− $28,479) versus $62,083 (+/− $15,309) for females. The per capita income for the borough was $54,241 (+/− $6,162). About 0.9% of families and 2.7% of the population were below the poverty line, including 1.5% of those under age 18 and 9.6% of those age 65 or over.

=== 2000 census ===
As of the 2000 United States census there were 5,937 people, 1,998 households, and 1,658 families residing in the borough. The population density was 3,559.3 inhabitants per square mile (1,374.3/km^{2}). There were 2,037 housing units at an average density of 1,221.2 per square mile (471.5/km^{2}). The racial makeup of the borough was 93.87% White, 4.09% African American, 0.03% Native American, 0.98% Asian, 0.22% from other races, and 0.81% from two or more races. Hispanic or Latino of any race were 1.33% of the population.

There were 1,998 households, out of which 47.6% had children under the age of 18 living with them, 72.1% were married couples living together, 9.3% had a female householder with no husband present, and 17.0% were non-families. 15.2% of all households were made up of individuals, and 7.3% had someone living alone who was 65 years of age or older. The average household size was 2.97 and the average family size was 3.33.

In the borough the population was spread out, with 33.0% under the age of 18, 4.0% from 18 to 24, 28.5% from 25 to 44, 24.1% from 45 to 64, and 10.3% who were 65 years of age or older. The median age was 37 years. For every 100 females, there were 94.0 males. For every 100 females age 18 and over, there were 87.9 males.

The median income for a household in the borough was $97,220, and the median income for a family was $109,760. Males had a median income of $83,657 versus $51,389 for females. The per capita income for the borough was $44,018. About 1.6% of families and 2.3% of the population were below the poverty line, including 2.1% of those under age 18 and 4.6% of those age 65 or over.

== Government ==
=== Local government ===
Fair Haven is governed under the borough form of New Jersey municipal government, which is used in 218 municipalities (of the 564) statewide, making it the most common form of government in New Jersey. The governing body is comprised of the mayor and the borough council, with all positions elected at-large on a partisan basis as part of the November general election. A mayor is elected directly by the voters to a four-year term of office. The borough council includes six members elected to serve three-year terms on a staggered basis, with two seats coming up for election each year in a three-year cycle. The borough form of government used by Fair Haven is a "weak mayor / strong council" government in which council members act as the legislative body with the mayor presiding at meetings and voting only in the event of a tie. The mayor can veto ordinances subject to an override by a two-thirds majority vote of the council. The mayor makes committee and liaison assignments for council members, and most appointments are made by the mayor with the advice and consent of the council.

As of 2025, the mayor of the Borough of Fair Haven is Republican Joshua Halpern, whose term of office ends on December 31, 2026. Members of the Fair Haven Borough Council are Council President Elizabeth M. "Betsy" Koch (R, 2027), Tracey Cole (R, 2027), Michal DiMiceli (D, 2026), Brian Olson (R, 2026), Christina Malecki (D, 2028), and Kevin Griffin (R, 2028).

In February 2017, the borough council selected Christopher Rodriguez from a list of three candidates nominated by the Democratic municipal committee to fill the seat expiring in December 2017 that had been held by Aimee Humphreys until she resigned from office as she was moving out of the borough; Rodriguez serve until the November 2017 general election, when he was elected to serve the two-month balance of the term and to fill a new three-year term.

Benjamin Lucarelli was chosen as mayor in February 2012 to fill the vacancy caused by the resignation of Mike Halfacre, and who left office to take a position in the New Jersey Division of Alcoholic Beverage Control, with Eric R. Jaeger in turn chosen in March 2012 to fill Lucarelli's vacancy on the borough council.

Fair Haven was a participating municipality in an initiative to study regionalization of their municipal police force with one or more municipalities. The borough received a grant from the New Jersey Department of Community Affairs in the amount of $40,950 along with the Boroughs of Rumson, Little Silver, Oceanport and Shrewsbury to hire professional consultants to conduct the study on their behalf. A report was prepared that proposed that on or about July 1, 2009, Fair Haven would close and move their Police, Fire and EMS dispatching over to Little Silver. After deadlines to begin this operation were missed, dispatching of police and emergency services would be handled by the Monmouth County Sheriff's office by October 1, 2009. The proposal to consolidate services with Little Silver was presented to and rejected by the voters.

=== Federal, state, and county representation ===
Fair Haven is located in the 6th Congressional District and is part of New Jersey's 13th state legislative district.

Prior to the 2011 reapportionment following the 2010 census, Fair Haven had been in the 12th state legislative district. Prior to the 2010 Census, Fair Haven had been part of the 12th Congressional District, a change made by the New Jersey Redistricting Commission that took effect in January 2013, based on the results of the November 2012 general elections.

For the 119th United States Congress, New Jersey's 6th congressional district is represented by Frank Pallone (D, Long Branch). New Jersey is represented in the United States Senate by Democrats Cory Booker (Newark, term ends 2027) and Andy Kim (Moorestown, term ends 2031).

For the 2026–2027 session, the 13th legislative district of the New Jersey Legislature is represented in the New Jersey Senate by Declan O'Scanlon (R, Little Silver) and in the General Assembly by Vicky Flynn (R, Holmdel Township) and Gerard Scharfenberger (R, Middletown Township).

Monmouth County is governed by a Board of County Commissioners composed of five members who are elected at-large to serve three-year terms of office on a staggered basis, with either one or two seats up for election each year as part of the November general election. At an annual reorganization meeting held in the beginning of January, the board selects one of its members to serve as director and another as deputy director.

As of 2025, Monmouth County's Commissioners are Director Thomas A. Arnone (R, Neptune City, 2025), Susan M. Kiley (R, Hazlet Township, 2027), Erik Anderson (R, Shrewsbury, 2026), Nick DiRocco (R, Wall Township, 2025), and Deputy Director Ross F. Licitra (R, Marlboro Township, 2026).

Constitutional officers elected on a countywide basis are Clerk Christine Giordano Hanlon (R, 2025; Ocean Township), Sheriff Shaun Golden (R, 2025; Howell Township) and Surrogate Rosemarie D. Peters (R, 2026; Middletown Township).

=== Politics ===
United States presidential election results for Fair Haven
Year	Republican		Democratic		Third party(ies)	
Year	No.	%	No.	%	No.	%
2024	1,670	43.89%	2,083	54.74%	52	1.37%
2020	1,604	39.52%	2,392	58.93%	63	1.55%
2016	1,476	43.21%	1,790	52.40%	150	4.39%
2012	1,679	53.69%	1,411	45.12%	37	1.18%
2008	1,664	48.06%	1,765	50.98%	33	0.95%
2004	1,765	51.97%	1,604	47.23%	27	0.80%
2000	1,523	49.21%	1,394	45.04%	178	5.75%
1996	1,310	46.70%	1,302	46.42%	193	6.88%
1992	1,382	47.84%	1,095	37.90%	412	14.26%

As of March 2011, there were a total of 4,201 registered voters in Fair Haven, of which 1,049 (25.0%) were registered as Democrats, 1,286 (30.6%) were registered as Republicans and 1,865 (44.4%) were registered as Unaffiliated. There was one voter registered to another party.

Gubernatorial election results for Fair Haven
Year	Republican		Democratic		Third party(ies)	
Year	No.	%	No.	%	No.	%
2025	1,522	47.71%	1,657	51.94%	11	0.34%
2021	1,430	51.98%	1,299	47.22%	22	0.80%
2017	1,227	51.77%	1,105	46.62%	38	1.60%
2013	1,275	68.73%	547	29.49%	33	1.78%
2009	1,459	59.12%	817	33.10%	192	7.78%
2005	1,212	53.27%	988	43.43%	75	3.30%

In the 2012 presidential election, Republican Mitt Romney received 53.7% of the vote (1,679 cast), ahead of Democrat Barack Obama with 45.1% (1,411 votes), and other candidates with 1.2% (37 votes), among the 3,141 ballots cast by the borough's 4,379 registered voters (14 ballots were spoiled), for a turnout of 71.7%. In the 2008 presidential election, Democrat Barack Obama received 50.5% of the vote (1,765 cast), ahead of Republican John McCain with 47.6% (1,664 votes) and other candidates with 0.9% (33 votes), among the 3,498 ballots cast by the borough's 4,343 registered voters, for a turnout of 80.5%. In the 2004 presidential election, Republican George W. Bush received 51.8% of the vote (1,765 ballots cast), outpolling Democrat John Kerry with 47.1% (1,604 votes) and other candidates with 0.6% (27 votes), among the 3,407 ballots cast by the borough's 4,184 registered voters, for a turnout percentage of 81.4.

In the 2013 gubernatorial election, Republican Chris Christie received 68.7% of the vote (1,275 cast), ahead of Democrat Barbara Buono with 29.5% (547 votes), and other candidates with 1.8% (33 votes), among the 1,873 ballots cast by the borough's 4,362 registered voters (18 ballots were spoiled), for a turnout of 42.9%. In the 2009 gubernatorial election, Republican Chris Christie received 58.8% of the vote (1,459 ballots cast), ahead of Democrat Jon Corzine with 32.9% (817 votes), Independent Chris Daggett with 7.2% (178 votes) and other candidates with 0.6% (14 votes), among the 2,480 ballots cast by the borough's 4,238 registered voters, yielding a 58.5% turnout.

United States Senate election results for Fair Haven1
Year	Republican		Democratic		Third party(ies)	
Year	No.	%	No.	%	No.	%
2024	1,772	46.95%	1,947	51.59%	55	1.46%
2018	1,496	50.51%	1,388	46.86%	78	2.63%
2012	1,751	58.11%	1,221	40.52%	41	1.36%
2006	1,334	53.60%	1,110	44.60%	45	1.81%

United States Senate election results for Fair Haven2
Year	Republican		Democratic		Third party(ies)	
Year	No.	%	No.	%	No.	%
2020	1,837	45.31%	2,171	53.55%	46	1.13%
2014	976	49.82%	953	48.65%	30	1.53%
2013	570	44.32%	709	55.13%	7	0.54%
2008	1,797	54.62%	1,434	43.59%	59	1.79%

== Education ==
The Fair Haven Public Schools serves students in pre-kindergarten through eighth grade. As of the 2022–23 school year, the district, comprised of two schools, had an enrollment of 964 students and 105.0 classroom teachers (on an FTE basis), for a student–teacher ratio of 9.2:1. Schools in the district (with 2022–23 enrollment data from the National Center for Education Statistics) are Viola L. Sickles School with 452 students in grades PreK–3 and Knollwood School with 504 students in grades 4–8.

Students in public school for ninth through twelfth grades attend Rumson-Fair Haven Regional High School, together with students from Rumson, where the school is located. As of the 2022–23 school year, the high school had an enrollment of 876 students and 83.8 classroom teachers (on an FTE basis), for a student–teacher ratio of 10.5:1. In 2016, Newsweek ranked RFH the 144th best high school in the United States. Seats on the high school district's nine-member board of education are allocated based on the population of the constituent municipalities, with four seats assigned to Fair Haven.

== Transportation ==
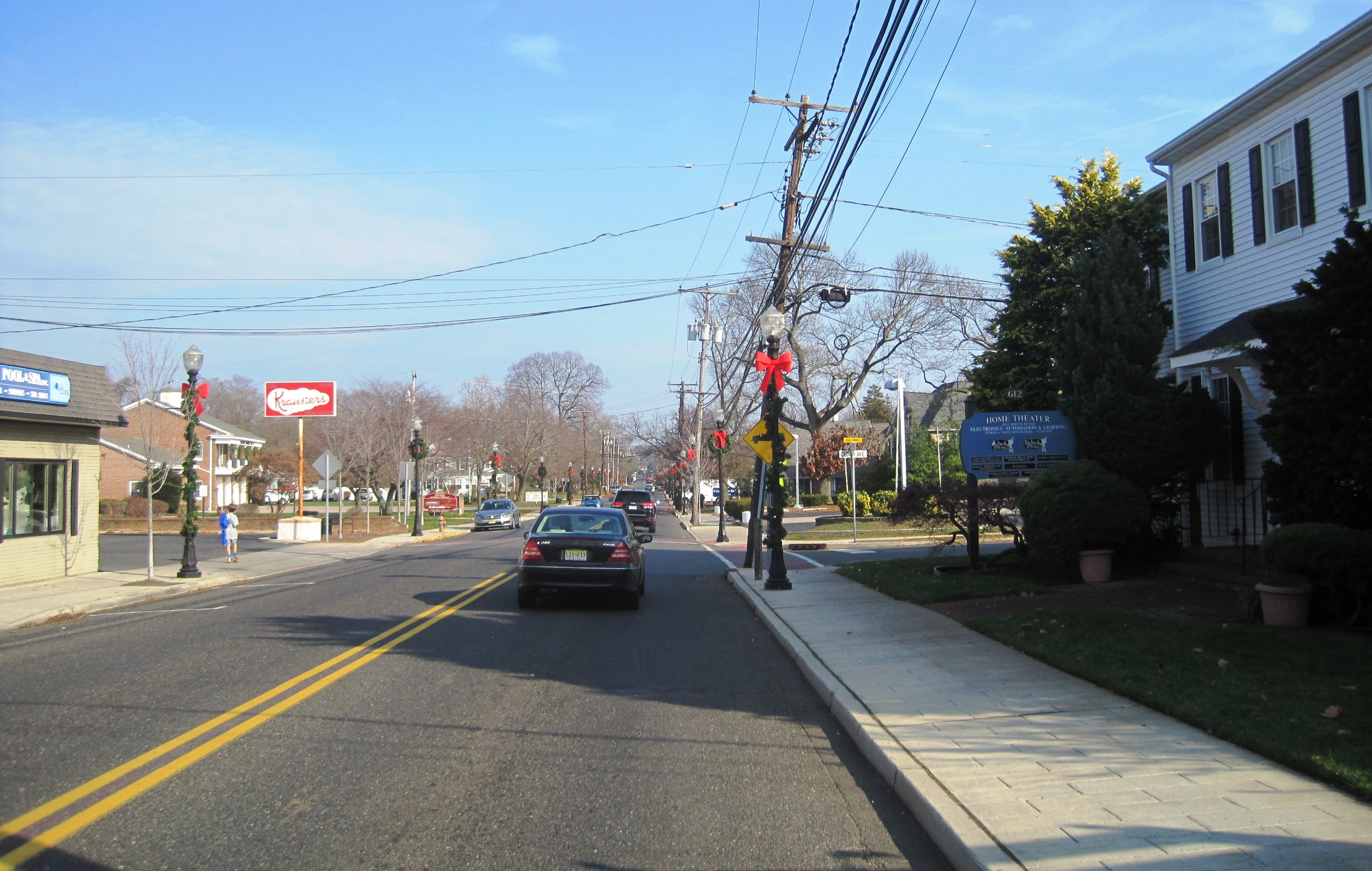
The central business district of Fair Haven along River Road (County Route 10)

=== Roads and highways ===
As of May 2010, the borough had a total of 23.95 miles (38.54 km) of roadways, of which 21.40 miles (34.44 km) were maintained by the municipality and 2.55 miles (4.10 km) by Monmouth County.

No Interstate, U.S. or state highways pass through Fair Haven. County Route 10 (River Road) is the main road through the town.

=== Public transportation ===
NJ Transit provides local service on the 835 route. The nearest train station is at Red Bank, where service is available on the North Jersey Coast Line.

== Notable people ==
People who were born in, residents of, or otherwise closely associated with Fair Haven include:

- Katie Coyle (born c. 1986), author of the Vivian Apple series of young adult novels
- Schuyler DeBree (born 1996), professional soccer player who plays as a defender for North Carolina Courage of the National Women's Soccer League
- Clinton B. Fisk (1828–1890), senior officer during the Reconstruction Era in the Bureau of Refugees, Freedmen and Abandoned Lands, who was the namesake of Fisk University
- Jacquelyn Jablonski (born 1991), fashion model
- Connor Jaeger (born 1991), Men's 1500 meter swimmer who competed at the 2012 London Olympics, and winner of the silver medal in the 1500 meter freestyle at the 2016 Rio Olympics
- Adrienne-Joi Johnson (born 1963), actress, who appeared in House Party and Baby Boy
- Vince Lombardi (1913–1970), lived in Fair Haven while coaching with the New York Giants
- Robert W. Lucky (1936–2022), engineer
- Bruce Mapes (1901–1961), figure skating pioneer who invented the flip jump and the toe loop jump
- Kevin Ryan (born 1967), president and CEO of Covenant House International
- Bonnard J. Teegarden (born 1940), astrophysicist formerly with NASA's Goddard Space Flight Center, best known for leading the team that discovered Teegarden's Star in 2003
- Charlie Volker (born 1997), bobsledder who represented the United States in the two-man bobsleigh event and in the four-man event at the 2022 Winter Olympics
